= Vintar =

Municipality in Ilocos Norte, Philippines

- Municipality
- Municipality of Vintar (Ili ti Vintar)
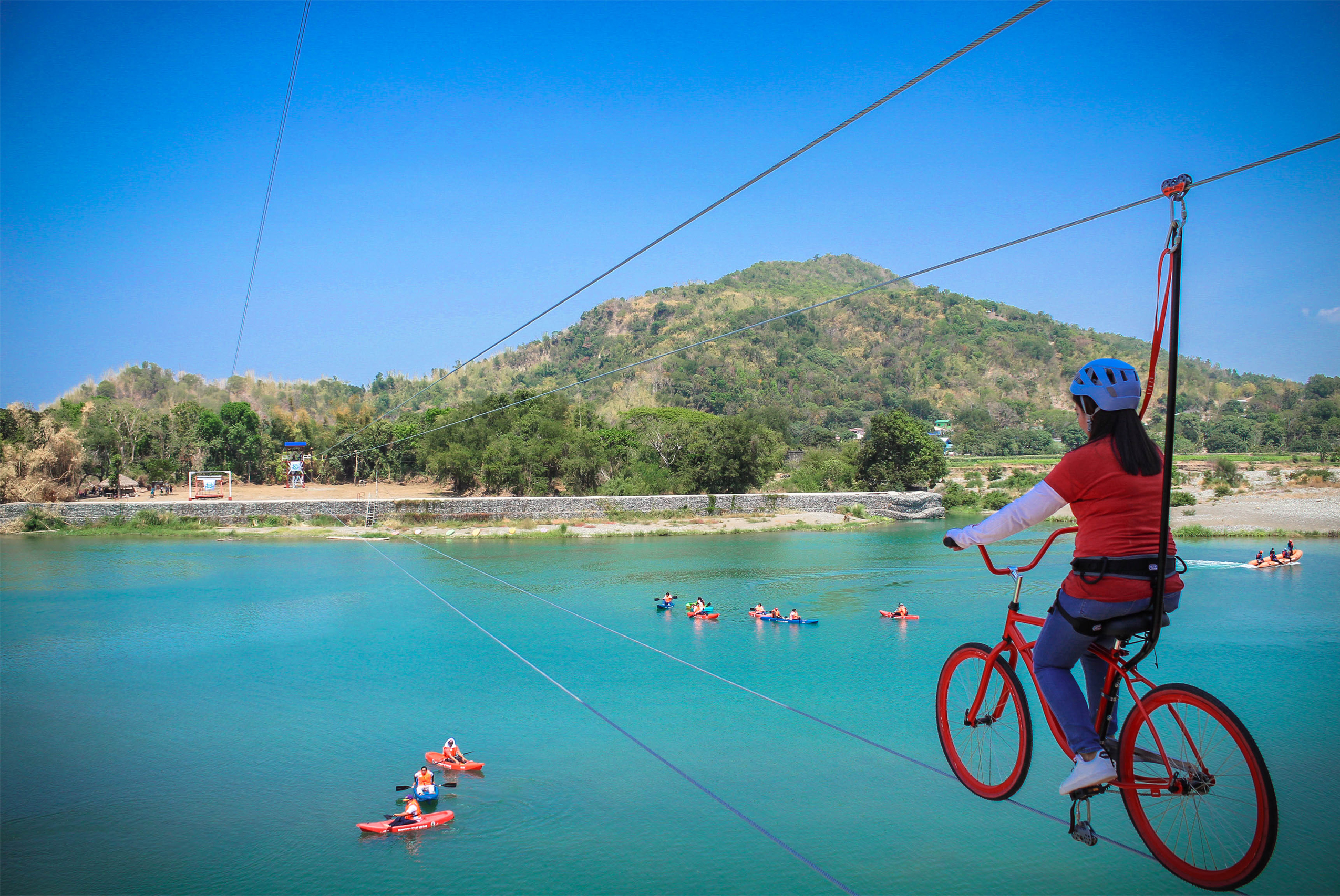
- Vintar Bikeline 2020

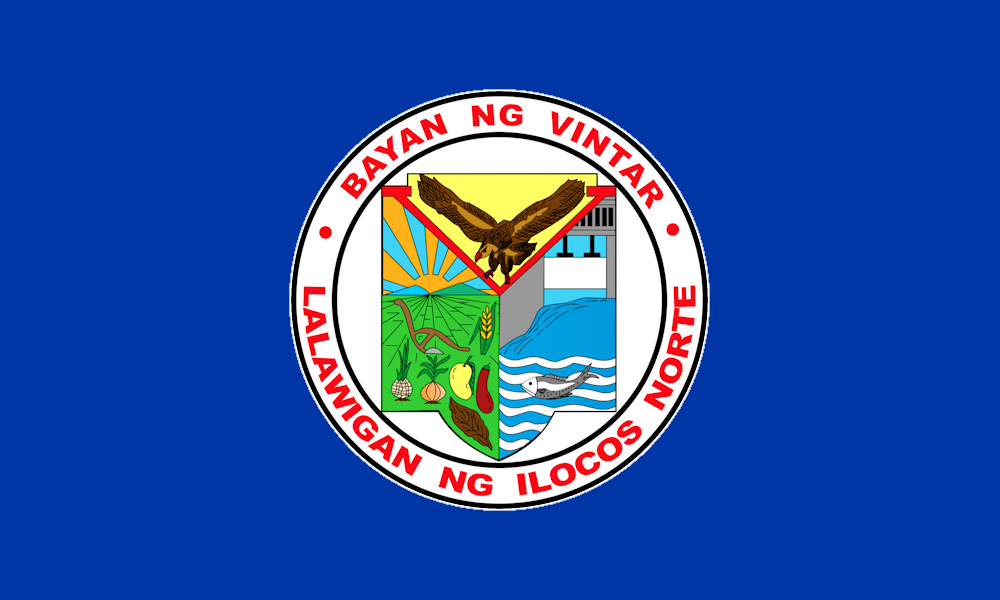
- Flag
- Motto: Dur-asen, Vintaren! - Ragsak, Ayat ken Dungngo: Napudpudno a Serbisyo
- Anthem: Vintar Hymn (Agbiag Ka Vintar)
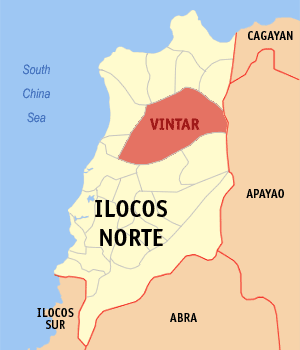
- Map of Ilocos Norte with Vintar highlighted
- Interactive map of Vintar
- Location within the Philippines
- Coordinates: 18°13′50″N 120°38′56″E
- Country: Philippines
- Region: Ilocos Region
- Province: Ilocos Norte
- District: 1st district
- Founded: 1909
- Barangays: 33 (see Barangays)

Government
  - Type: Sangguniang Bayan
  - Mayor: Hon. Richard A. Degala
  - Vice Mayor: Hon. Maribel A. Albano, MD
  - Representative: Ferdinand Alexander Marcos III
  - Municipal Council: Members: SBM Amando Federico "Rik-Rik" E. Ong II; SBM Randy "Antikel" A. Degala; SBM Maricel "Marie" B. Foronda; SBM Antero A. Caluya; SBM Josey Florian C. Foronda; SBM Jobel Fred M. Forona; SBM Lindbergh "Lindy" S. Castillo; SBM Carlito V. Rasdas; SBM/LNB Pres. Rolando B. Boque; SBM/PPSK Pres. Vincent Kyle R. Dalere; SBM/MIPMR Macario B. Gudayan
  - Electorate: 22,505 voters (2025)

Area
  - Total: 614.35 km^{2} (237.20 sq mi)
- Elevation: 59 m (194 ft)
- Highest elevation: 338 m (1,109 ft)
- Lowest elevation: 8 m (26 ft)

Population (2024 census)
  - Total: 35,051
  - Density: 57.054/km^{2} (147.77/sq mi)
  - Households: 8,422

Economy
  - Income class: 1st municipal income class
  - Poverty incidence: 4.46% (2023)
  - Revenue: ₱ 407.8 million (2024)
  - Assets: ₱ 990.5 million (2024)
  - Expenditure: ₱ 272.3 million (2024)
  - Liabilities: ₱ 131.7 million (2024)

Service provider
  - Electricity: Ilocos Norte Electric Cooperative (INEC)
- Time zone: UTC+8 (PST)
- ZIP code: 2915
- PSGC: 0102823000
- IDD : area code: +63 (0)77
- Native languages: Ilocano; Tagalog

Vintar, officially the Municipality of Vintar (Ilocano: Ili ti Vintar; Tagalog: Bayan ng Vintar), is a municipality in the province of Ilocos Norte, Philippines. According to the 2024 census, it has a population of 35,051 people.

Vintar is the largest municipality in Ilocos Norte by land area. Its patron saint is Saint Nicholas de Tolentino. It is home to one of the biggest convents in the province, which also hosts the Saint Nicholas Academy.

The town is also where the Vintar Dam, the first dam funded by the World Bank in Southeast Asia and an important cultural property listed by the National Commission for Culture and the Arts (NCCA), is located. It is also the site of the Umok ni Siwawer Eco-Tourism Nature Park, the town's popular picnic resort.

== Etymology ==
Vintar derived its name from the Ilocano word, "intar", which used to describe the formation or order taken by the subject from their ruler whenever the chief called them to attention. It is said that a visiting Spanish missionary heard the word and added the letter V, referring to the “V” formation that the missionary saw.

== History ==
The town's earliest settlers are believed to be of Malay in origin. They first settled on a hill overlooking the Bislak. The town was founded by the Spanish missionaries who got lost in the woods while hunting between Sarrat and Piddig. Vintar became a visita of Bacarra but it was later established as a Parish of San Nicolas de Tolentino. Earlier in 1763, Vintar was reverted to a visita until it became independent in 1774.

In 1903, Vintar was annexed as a barrio of Bacarra. It gained its separation and independence in 1909.

The town is home to one of the biggest convents in Ilocos Norte. In 1931, an earthquake partially destroyed its church and convent. Five years later, it was restored. The convent which houses the Saint Nicolas Academy was restored in 1982.

Vintar was one of the Ilocos region municipalities where various human rights violations were documented during the martial law era, despite public perception that the region was supportive of the Marcos administration. Three indigenous community members in Vintar are documented to have been "salvaged" in 1984, the same year as eight farmers in Bangui also disappeared, while farmers from the towns of Vintar, Dumalneg, Solsona, Marcos and Piddig were also documented to have been tortured.

== Culture ==
Vintar celebrates the feast of St. Nicholas every 10 September, a religious tradition inherited from the Augustinians lives that still practice the distribution of “tinapay ni San Nicolas” (unleavened bread). But the Siwawer Festival, the annual town fiesta of Vintar is held from December 26–30 of every year.

The people of Vintar engage in farming, fishing and herding. The town is generally rural but famous all over the province for its beautiful women with strongly Spanish features. Hence the town has its moniker, “The Home of Beautiful People”.

Vintar is also the site of four important cultural properties listed by the National Commission for Culture and the Arts. These are Vintar Dam, the Old Municipal Building, San Nicolas de Tolentino Parish Church and the Gabaldon Building.

Vintar was once known for Abel Iloco or Inabel, especially the classic Binandera Abel, which flourished “in the north of the river,” as proven by a loom displayed at the Museo de Siwawer in Barangay Abkir.

== Geography ==
The Municipality of Vintar is considered as the sixth major river system in the region. Its head waters are on the western Cordillera slopes at the Kalinga and Apayao borders. It flows eastward and irrigates most of the flat lands of Ilocos Norte before making its exit into the South China Sea. Vintar has the largest land area in Ilocos Norte.

It is located on a plain land surrounded by mountains. Vintar is surrounded and bordered by:

- Bangui, Adams, Dumalneg, Burgos, and Pagudpud in the north;
- Laoag, Sarrat, Piddig, and Carasi in the south;
- Pasuquin and Bacarra in the west;
- Calanasan, Apayao in the east.

Vintar is situated 9.43 kilometres (5.86 mi) from the provincial capital Laoag, and 490.99 kilometres (305.09 mi) from the country's capital city of Manila.

=== Barangays ===
Vintar is politically subdivided into 33 barangays. Each barangay consists of puroks and some have sitios.

- Abkir
- Alejo Malasig
- Alsem
- Bago
- Bulbulala
- Cabangaran
- Cabayo
- Cabisocolan
- Canaam
- Columbia
- Dagupan
- Dipilat
- Esperanza
- Ester
- Isic Isic
- Lubnac
- Mabanbanag
- Malampa (Malampa-Paninaan)
- Manarang
- Margaay
- Namoroc
- Parparoroc
- Parut
- Pedro F. Alviar
- Salsalamagui
- San Jose/Santo Tomas (Lipay/Saricao)
- San Nicolas (Poblacion)
- San Pedro (Poblacion)
- San Ramon (Poblacion)
- San Roque (Poblacion)
- Santa Maria (Poblacion)
- Tamdagan
- Visaya

=== Sub-divisions ===
Poblacion Poblacion is the center-most subdivision of Vintar. Poblacion is composed of 5 barangays namely:

- 1- San Roque
- 2- San Nicolas
- 3- San Pedro
- 4- Santa Maria
- 5- San Ramon

Metro Poblacion Metro Poblacion is located on the outer-most of the center of the poblacion and composed of 5 barangays namely:

- 6- Parut
- 7- Alejo Malasig
- 8- Margaay
- 9- Lubnac
- 10- Parparoroc
- 15- Visaya

Pallas Valley It is located at the north-east of Vintar. Pallas Valley is composed of 4 barangays namely:

- 11- Bulbulala
- 12- Namoroc
- 13- Mabanbanag
- 14- Ester

North of the River (Amian ti Karayan) North of the River or "Amian ti Karayan" is located north of the Bislak River from Poblacion. It is called so after the Ilocano word "Amian" which means north. Amian ti Karayan is composed of 8 barangays namely:

- 16- Salsalamagui
- 17- P.F. Alviar
- 18- Abkir
- 19- Columbia
- 20- Cabisuculan
- 21- Malampa
- 22- Manarang
- 24- Alsem

Lower Surong Valley

- 23- Dipilat
- 25- Tamdagan
- 26- Canaam
- 27- Esperanza
- 28- Bago
- 29/30- San Jose/Sto.Tomas

Upper Surong Valley Upper Surong Valley is composed of 4 barangays namely:

- 31- Dagupan
- 32- Cabangaran
- 33- Cabayo
- 34- Isic Isic

=== Sitios/Puroks ===
Barangay #6 Parut

- Sitio Pugapog
- Sitio Lubong
- Sitio Turod

Barangay #7 Alejo Malasig

- Purok Liwliwa
- Purok Saldet
- Purok Namnama Proper
- Purok Namnama 1
- Purok Sadiri
- Purok Sinamar
- Purok Rang-ay 1
- Purok Rang-ay 2

Barangay #9 Lubnac

- Purok Rang-ay 1
- Purok Rang-ay 2
- Purok Namnama West 1
- Purok Namnama West 2
- Purok Namnama West 3
- Purok Namnama East
- Purok Saniata
- Purok Silnag
- Purok Liwliwa
- Purok Sadiri
- Purok Sinamar East
- Purok Sinamar West

Barangay #10 Parparoroc

- Sitio Bucana (Purok Linglingay)
- Sitio Madangro (Purok Namnama)
- Sitio Baldi (Purok Saniata)
- Purok Rang-ay
- Purok Saranay
- Purok Sarikedked
- Purok Sadiri

Barangay #17 PF Alviar

- Sitio Diaton
- Sitio Baybayawas
- Sitio Salsalamagui
- Purok 1 - Sirmata
- Purok 2 - Rang-ay
- Purok 3 - Namnama
- Purok 4 - Saranay
- Purok 5 - Ragsak
- Purok 6 - Gin-awa

Barangay #18 Abkir

- Sitio Lubong (Purok 5 - Ilang-Ilang)
- Sitio Salinong (Purok 6 - Kamia)
- Purok 1 - Rose
- Purok 2 - Rosal
- Purok 3 - Sampaguita
- Purok 4 - Gumamela

Barangay #19 Columbia

- Sitio Maapgad (Purok Maapgad South, Purok Maapgad North & Purok Maapgad East)
- Sitio Bacsil (Purok Bacsil South & Purok Bacsil North)
- Sitio Columbia Centro

Barangay #20 Cabisuculan

- Sitio Maipangal West
- Sitio Maipangal East
- Sitio Maipangal Centro
- Sitio Turod
- Sitio Marabanos Proper
- Sitio Marabanos West
- Sitio Marabanos East

Barangay #21 Malampa-Peninaan

- Sitio Malampa Proper
- Sitio Upper Peninaan
- Sitio Lower Peninaan
- Sitio Marabanos

Barangay #26 Canaam

- Sitio Masadsaduel
- Sitio Canadem
- Sitio Borbor
- Sitio Mangrapon
- Sitio Gubang
- Sitio Casgayan
- Sitio Hacienda

Barangay #29/30 San Jose/Sto. Tomas

- Sitio Lipay (Purok Namnama, Purok Regta & Purok Timpuyog)
- Sitio Saricao (Purok Sinamar, Purok Ninniog & Purok Balbalay)

=== History of Barangays ===
PARUT

- BRIEF HISTORY OF BARANGAY PARUT

Barangay Parut is located in the southwestern part of the Municipality of Vintar, Ilocos Norte. The area is characterized by vast agricultural lands consisting of both hilly and flat terrain, which have long been suitable for farming and human settlement. Because of its fertile soil and favorable landscape, the place gradually attracted early settlers who relied mainly on agriculture as their primary source of livelihood.

According to oral tradition passed down through generations, the name “Parut” traces its origin to the early period of Spanish colonization in the Philippines. During that time, Spanish soldiers and explorers often traveled beyond the poblacion of Vintar to survey surrounding lands, maintain order, and observe the activities of the local inhabitants.

It is said that one day, a Spanish soldier riding on horseback ventured south of the town proper, passing through a wide and peaceful countryside covered with tall grasses, cultivated patches of land, and gentle hills. As he rode along the open fields, he noticed a local farmer bent over the ground, clearing a portion of land with his bare hands by pulling out weeds and unwanted plants to prepare the soil for planting.

Curious about the unfamiliar place, the soldier stopped and asked the man in Spanish, “¿Cómo se llama este lugar?” meaning, “What is the name of this place?” The local farmer, however, did not understand the Spanish language. Believing that the soldier was asking about what he was doing, the man replied in Ilocano, “Agparparut,” which means “pulling out weeds.” The Spanish soldier, unfamiliar with the local dialect, assumed that the word he heard referred to the name of the place.

Continuing his journey, the soldier encountered several other residents who were walking toward their farms carrying farming tools. Hoping to confirm the name of the area, he asked the same question again. Once more, the locals misunderstood him and simply answered “Agparut,” referring to the act of removing weeds from the soil before planting. Hearing the same word repeatedly from different people, the soldier became convinced that the place was indeed called “Parut.”

When the soldier later returned to his station in the poblacion, he shared his experience with fellow soldiers and officials, referring to the area he had visited as “Parut.” Over time, the name gradually spread among Spanish authorities and local residents alike. What began as a simple misunderstanding between a foreign soldier and local farmers eventually became the recognized name of the place.

From that time on, the settlement became known as Parut—a name deeply connected to the agricultural life of its early inhabitants. The term reflected the simple yet essential activity of clearing the land, an important step in preparing fields for planting and sustaining the livelihood of farming families.

Before becoming an independent barangay, Parut was originally one of the sitios under Barangay No. 6 of Vintar during the earlier administrative organization of the municipality. The territories that formed the community included Sitio Pait, Sitio Parut, and Sitio Margaay, which were governed by appointed Tenientes del Barrio during the Spanish period and later under the American administrative system. During these times, the residents were primarily farmers who cultivated rice, corn, and other crops in both lowland and upland farms. As the years passed, the community gradually expanded as more families settled in the fertile agricultural lands.

By the mid-20th century, the population of Sitio Parut steadily increased. Because of the growing number of residents and its considerable distance from the mother barangay, community leaders and residents began to express their desire to establish an independent administrative unit. This aspiration became possible with the enactment of Republic Act No. 2370, also known as the Barrio Charter Act of 1959, which granted greater autonomy and recognition to barrios across the Philippines. Taking advantage of this legal framework, the residents of Sitio Parut petitioned for separation from their mother barangay. With the support of the municipal government of Vintar, particularly during the administration of Mayor Pedro F. Alviar in the 1960s, the community was formally recognized as an independent barrio. The name Parut was retained, and the area officially became known as Barrio Parut, which later evolved into Barangay Parut following the nationwide adoption of the barangay system in the 1970s.

Today, Barangay Parut is composed of several sitios and puroks, including Lubong (Lubong 1 and 2), Pugapog, Parut (Parut 1 and 2), Turod, and Susolungen. Agriculture remains the primary livelihood of the residents, with farmers cultivating crops such as rice, corn, vegetables, and sugarcane. Rice continues to be the main agricultural product of the community, supplemented by livestock raising and other farming activities that help support household incomes.

Over the years, the barangay has experienced gradual development and improvement in living conditions. Many houses have been constructed using stronger materials such as concrete, reflecting the steady progress of the community. Migration from nearby areas has also contributed to the growth of the population and the strengthening of social and economic ties among residents.

ALEJO MALASIG

- BRIEF HISTORY OF BARANGAY ALEJO MALASIG

Barangay Alejo Malasig, located approximately two (2) kilometers south of the town proper of Vintar, Ilocos Norte, serves today as one of the gateway communities to the municipality, where the Welcome Arc of Vintar stands as a symbol of entry to the Metro Poblacion area. Before it became an independent barangay, the area was originally known as Sitio Pait, a small rural settlement that was once part of a larger barangay jurisdiction.

The name “Pait,” which literally means “bitter,” was derived from the abundance of ampalaya (bitter melon) plants that naturally grew and were cultivated in the area. Early settlers depended heavily on agriculture for their livelihood, and the fertile lands of Sitio Pait proved suitable for various crops. Because of the widespread presence of ampalaya in the community, the sitio gradually became popularly known among neighboring settlements as Sitio Pait.

During the Spanish colonial period in the Philippines, rural communities in towns like Vintar were governed under the “Teniente del Barrio” system, a local leadership structure established by Spanish authorities to administer villages and maintain order in the countryside. Among the notable local leaders during that time was Teniente del Barrio Alejo Malasig, a respected resident of the area. Alejo Malasig was known not only for his leadership but also for being a haciendero, or owner of a large agricultural estate. His lands covered a significant portion of the surrounding area, where farming activities flourished and provided livelihood to many residents.

Because of his influence, leadership, and contributions to the development of the community, Alejo Malasig became an important historical figure among the early settlers. The territories that later composed the community included Sitio Pait, Sitio Parut, and Sitio Margaay, which were then under the jurisdiction of what was known as Barangay No. 6 of Vintar and governed by successive Tenientes del Barrio.

During the American colonial period and the years leading to World War II, the settlement continued to grow gradually as more families moved into the fertile lands surrounding Sitio Pait. Agriculture remained the primary source of livelihood, and the area slowly developed into a stable farming community. Despite the challenges brought by the war and the economic hardships during the Japanese occupation, the residents of the sitio maintained their agricultural traditions and communal cooperation.

In the decades following World War II, the population of Sitio Pait gradually increased as more families settled in the area, attracted by its fertile agricultural lands. Due to its growing population and its considerable distance from the mother barangay, the residents began to aspire to establish their own independent administrative community. This aspiration was made possible through Republic Act No. 2370, otherwise known as the Barrio Charter Act, which granted greater autonomy to barrios throughout the Philippines. Taking advantage of this legal framework, the residents pursued the formal separation of Sitio Pait from its original barangay.

Through the support of the municipal government of Vintar during the administration of Mayor Pedro F. Alviar in the 1960s, the community was officially recognized as an independent barrio. In honor of the respected former village leader Teniente del Barrio Alejo Malasig, the newly established barrio was eventually named Barangay Alejo Malasig, commemorating his leadership and contributions to the early development of the community.

Through the leadership and initiative of Barangay Captain Orminio Malasig, a resolution was filed in accordance with the provisions of the Barrio Charter, seeking the official recognition of the community as a separate barangay. After the approval of the separation, Sitio Pait was officially established as an independent barangay and was renamed Barangay Alejo Malasig in honor of the early village leader Teniente del Barrio Alejo Malasig, whose legacy played a significant role in the community’s early development.

Today, Barangay Alejo Malasig is composed of seven (7) sitios or puroks, namely: Liwliwa, Saldet, Pait Proper, Namnama, Sadiri, Sinamar, and Rang-ay. The residents are primarily engaged in agriculture, cultivating both lowland and upland farms where crops such as rice, corn, and sugarcane are planted. Among these, rice remains the most important cash crop, supplemented by livestock raising and other farming activities.

Over the years, the barangay has experienced gradual development and progress. Many houses have been constructed using concrete materials, reflecting the improving economic conditions of the community. Families from nearby areas have also migrated and settled in the barangay, strengthening the community’s population and social ties.

The people of Barangay Alejo Malasig are known for their strong sense of unity, hospitality, and peaceful relationships with one another. These values contribute to the continued progress and harmony within the barangay.

The Barangay Fiesta of Alejo Malasig, celebrated every month of May, serves as an important cultural and social event for the community. The weeklong celebration features various activities such as sports competitions, social gatherings, cultural presentations, pageantry, and popularity contests. These festivities not only strengthen camaraderie among residents but also preserve the traditions and identity of the barangay.

Through its beginnings as Sitio Pait, its historical connection to Teniente del Barrio Alejo Malasig, and the efforts of its residents to establish an independent community, Barangay Alejo Malasig is rural community in the Municipality of Vintar.

MARGAAY

- BRIEF HISTORY OF BARANGAY MARGAAY

Nestled in the southern part of the Municipality of Vintar, Barangay Margaay is a peaceful community known today for its unity, resilience, and strong cultural roots. Like many rural areas in Ilocos Norte, the name Margaay carries a rich tale passed down through generations—part folklore, part oral tradition, and wholly a reflection of the deep connection between its people and their land.

Long before modern development, the area now known as Barangay Margaay was home to a small group of Ilocano settlers. According to elders, only a single family resided in the area during the early Spanish colonial period, making their home on a fertile land dotted with rivers, forests, and a small pond, known locally as a “Lubo”—soft, unstable, or swampy ground.

Among the early settlers was a woman affectionately called Nana Marga, a strong and humble maiden who often foraged for food for her family. One afternoon, while gathering snails near the pond, she stepped onto a patch of lubo and began sinking slowly into the soft, treacherous ground.

Her husband, Tata Aran, returning from the forest at dusk, grew worried when he could not find her. Calling out repeatedly, he shouted “Marga! Marga!” into the fading light. At the same time, two Spanish soldiers on patrol, drawn by the commotion, approached him. When asked in Spanish, “¿Cómo se llama este lugar?” (“What is the name of this place?”), Tata Aran, misunderstanding the question, answered “Marga!”

From the distance, a faint cry echoed back: “Ay!”—Nana Marga responding to her husband’s calls. Rushing toward the sound, Tata Aran found his wife and helped her out of the quicksand. Witnessing the reunion, the Spanish soldiers combined the two words they had just heard—“Marga” and “Ay”—and recorded the name Margaay on their maps.

Thus, the name Margaay was born—a word forged in a moment of fear, love, and miraculous reunion. Over time, it became more than a label on a map; it came to symbolize survival, family, and community resilience. Tata Aran and Nana Marga’s experience was passed down as a tale of caution and perseverance, warning neighbors of the dangerous lubo surrounding the pond.

Another local belief regarding the origin of Margaay relates to the geography of the land. Early settlers noted that the barangay, with its long, sloping terrain at the foot of the mountains, was prone to landslides during the rainy season. In Ilocano, “margaay” means “will collapse,” “will give way,” or “will crumble,” reflecting the unstable soil. Generations of farmers observed the soil’s tendency to cave in, particularly in the ricefields and cornlands, giving rise to the barangay’s name.

As the years passed, more people settled in the area. Ricefields expanded, and the community constructed irrigation canals to support their crops. With guidance from national, provincial, and municipal governments, they adopted modern agricultural techniques, improving rice planting and diversifying crops.

From a humble settlement of a single family, Barangay Margaay grew into a thriving community defined by unity, tradition, and perseverance. Today, its name stands as a living testament to the resilience of its people, their close ties to the land, and the enduring stories that continue to shape their identity.

COLUMBIA

- BRIEF HISTORY OF BARANGAY COLUMBIA

"Flight of the Dove: The History and Heritage of Barangay Columbia"

Barangay Columbia, situated at the northwest part of the Municipality of Vintar, Ilocos Norte, carries a name steeped in symbolism. Derived from the Latin word "Columba," meaning dove, this community embodies the essence of peace, harmony, and hope. Its roots trace back to a time when it was merely a Sitio, known for its sanctuary of birds, particularly doves, which lent the place its serene atmosphere.

Before the 1960s, Barangay Columbia was part of a larger entity, merged with Barangay Cabisuculan and Sitio Marabanos. However, the residents, under the leadership of the esteemed village chieftain, Lolo Gustin, sought independence. Through gatherings and meetings, they endeavored to separate from the larger barangay to forge their own path.

Fortune smiled upon them when Barrio Cabisuculan was divided into two distinct barrios, with Columbia emerging as its own entity. This milestone was further solidified through Republic Act No. 2370, aptly titled "An Act Granting Autonomy to Barrios of the Philippines," which formally recognized Barangay Columbia's autonomy. It was under the administration of Mayor Pedro F. Alviar, during the 1960s, that the municipal government of Vintar officially established Barangay Columbia.

The journey of Barangay Columbia saw the stewardship of several dedicated leaders. Mr. Marcelo Miguel paved the way as the First Teniente del Barrio in 1960, followed by Mr. Felix Barut in 1970. In 1986, Mr. Severino Aceret assumed the role until his election as Barangay Captain in 1991. The subsequent years witnessed the tenure of Mr. Angelito Aceret, who served three consecutive terms, from 1991 to 2006. Mr. Antonio briefly held the position from 2006 to 2009.

However, Barangay Columbia found itself returning to familiar hands when Mr. Angelito Aceret resumed office, serving another three terms until 2023. A significant milestone was marked when Mrs. Gina Rose F. Butac became the first woman to be elected as Punong Barangay in 2023, a testament to the evolving landscape of leadership in the community.

Barangay Columbia, is not only rich in history but also in its contributions to the local economy. Renowned for its picturesque landscapes and vibrant community spirit, this barangay has carved a niche for itself in the agricultural sector.

Among its notable products is the traditional sugarcane wine known as Basi, a cherished beverage deeply ingrained in the local culture. The art of making Basi has been passed down through generations, with the residents of Barangay Columbia mastering the craft to perfection. This sweet elixir, with its distinct flavor and aroma, serves as a testament to the ingenuity and craftsmanship of the community.

In addition to Basi production, Barangay Columbia is also celebrated for its cultivation of tobacco, a crop that has been cultivated in the region for centuries. The fertile soil and favorable climate of the area provide an ideal environment for tobacco farming, allowing the barangay to thrive as a hub for this industry.

With sugarcane wine and tobacco production as pillars of its economy, Barangay Columbia continues to flourish, providing livelihood opportunities for its residents and contributing to the cultural tapestry of the region. As the barangay charts its course into the future, it remains steadfast in preserving its traditions while embracing innovation and progress.

Throughout its history, Barangay Columbia has stood as a beacon of unity, progress, and empowerment, embodying the spirit of its namesake, the dove, as it continues to soar towards a future filled with promise and prosperity.

CABISUCULAN

- BRIEF HISTORY OF BARANGAY CABISUCULAN

Barangay Cabisuculan is situated in the northern part of the Municipality of Vintar, approximately 4.8 kilometers from the town proper, along the banks of the river, locally referred to as “amian ti karayan.” The barangay is bordered by Barangay Malampa to the north, Barangay Salsalamagui to the east, Barangay Nambaran of Bacarra Municipality to the west, and Barangay Columbia to the south. Cabisuculan spans a total land area of 553.947 hectares and is composed of three sitios: Sitio Marabanos in the north, Sitio Maipangal in the east, and Sitio Turod in the west. The area is characterized by fertile rice fields surrounded by mountains, making agriculture the primary livelihood of its residents.

Historically, the area that is now Barangay Cabisuculan was rich in natural water sources, even in its higher terrains. These conditions supported extensive farming activities and sustained the livelihood of early settlers who depended mainly on agriculture. The fertile and loamy soil, combined with the presence of rivers and irrigation canals, also attracted various freshwater shells and snails which thrived in the rice paddies and waterways.

Among these freshwater shells, one of the most commonly found was the “kuhol,” known in the Ilocano language as “bisukol.” These snails were abundant in the fields and irrigation canals and were often gathered by farmers as an additional source of food. Because of their abundance in the area, the early settlers began to associate the place with the presence of these shells.

According to local elders and oral accounts passed down through generations, the barangay’s name was derived from the Ilocano word “bisukol,” referring to the kuhol or apple/golden snail (Pomacea canaliculata). Over time, as the settlement grew and the community became more established, the term “Bisukol” gradually evolved linguistically into “Cabisuculan,” following the local tradition of forming place names based on natural features found in the area.

In its early administrative history, Cabisuculan was originally recognized as the 12th barangay of the Municipality of Vintar. However, during the later reorganization and renumbering of barangays within the municipality, it was designated as Barangay No. 20.

Today, Barangay Cabisuculan remains a thriving agricultural community. Its fertile lands continue to sustain rice farming and other agricultural activities, while its name stands as a lasting reminder of the natural environment and resources that once defined the area and shaped the lives of its early inhabitants.

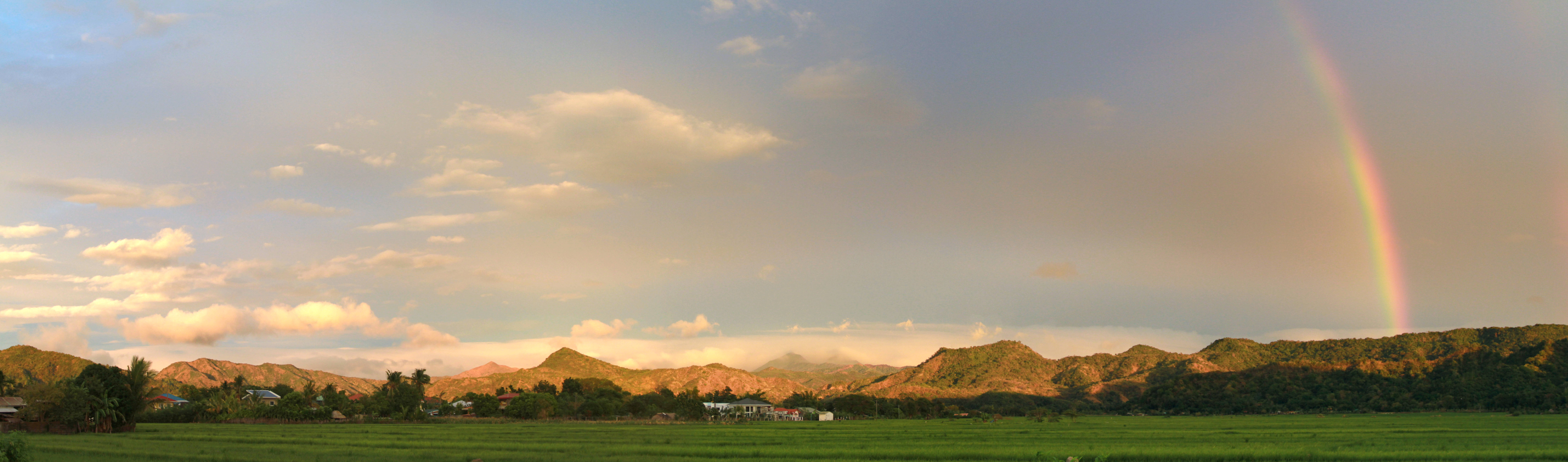
Vintar town with mountains in the background

=== Mount Baguinsuso ===
Mount Baguinsuso, also known as Mount Masadsada (Ilocano which means "passable valley"), is among the most recognized landmarks located in Barangay 15-Visaya.

== Climate ==
Climate data for Vintar, Ilocos Norte
| Month | Jan | Feb | Mar | Apr | May | Jun | Jul | Aug | Sep | Oct | Nov | Dec | Year |
|---|---|---|---|---|---|---|---|---|---|---|---|---|---|
| Mean daily maximum °C (°F) | 26 (79) | 28 (82) | 30 (86) | 32 (90) | 31 (88) | 31 (88) | 30 (86) | 30 (86) | 30 (86) | 29 (84) | 28 (82) | 26 (79) | 29 (85) |
| Mean daily minimum °C (°F) | 20 (68) | 20 (68) | 21 (70) | 23 (73) | 25 (77) | 25 (77) | 25 (77) | 25 (77) | 24 (75) | 23 (73) | 22 (72) | 21 (70) | 23 (73) |
| Average precipitation mm (inches) | 55 (2.2) | 41 (1.6) | 37 (1.5) | 41 (1.6) | 184 (7.2) | 215 (8.5) | 261 (10.3) | 256 (10.1) | 245 (9.6) | 216 (8.5) | 142 (5.6) | 129 (5.1) | 1,822 (71.8) |
| Average rainy days | 14.1 | 11.1 | 11.8 | 12.5 | 21.8 | 25.2 | 25.5 | 24.9 | 23.8 | 18.2 | 16.4 | 17.0 | 222.3 |
Source: Meteoblue (modeled/calculated data, not measured locally)

Vintar is divided into two types of climate:

- 90% or the Western Part: Two pronounced seasons, dry from December to May and wet from June to November. Maximum rain period is from June to September.
- 10% or the Eastern Part: No very pronounced maximum rain period, with a short dry season lasting only from one to three months.

== Demographics ==
Population census of Vintar

| Year | Pop. | ±% p.a. |
|---|---|---|
| 1903 | 9,435 | — |
| 1918 | 11,686 | +1.44% |
| 1939 | 14,153 | +0.92% |
| 1948 | 14,882 | +0.56% |
| 1960 | 17,359 | +1.29% |
| 1970 | 19,455 | +1.15% |
| 1975 | 21,655 | +2.17% |
| 1980 | 23,356 | +1.52% |

| Year | Pop. | ±% p.a. |
|---|---|---|
| 1990 | 27,084 | +1.49% |
| 1995 | 27,460 | +0.26% |
| 2000 | 29,031 | +1.20% |
| 2007 | 29,405 | +0.18% |
| 2010 | 31,448 | +2.47% |
| 2015 | 32,220 | +0.46% |
| 2020 | 33,339 | +0.72% |
| 2024 | 35,051 | +1.21% |

Source: Philippine Statistics Authority

In the 2024 census, the population of Vintar was 35,051 people, with a density of 57 inhabitants per square kilometre or 150 inhabitants per square mile.

== Economy ==
Poverty incidence of Vintar (%)

Source: Philippine Statistics Authority

Vintar's primary source of economy is agriculture. Rice and corn production anchor the town's primary crops. A Regional Yarn Production and Innovation Center operates in the municipality.

== Transportation ==
Vintar can be reached through air via Laoag International Airport at Laoag City, then hiring a tricycle or any other public transportation. From Manila by bus, it will take about 10 to 12 hours in reaching the center of Vintar. Farinas and Maria De Leon are the major companies that have a daily trip to Vintar.

== Festival ==
Siwawer Festival is the annual festival of Vintar. This festival of the town is being celebrated in honor of the Siwawer, the local name of the brahminy kite species of eagle that soars the skies of Vintar. The Festival starts on December 4, which is also Vintar Day, the foundation of the municipality when it was separated from the town of Bacarra in 1909.This festival was later seconded by the Imalawa tribe that resides in Vintar which is believed to be the first tribe that settled there—living within the boundaries between Vintar and Dumalneg.

== Government ==
=== Local government ===
Vintar, belonging to the first congressional district of the province of Ilocos Norte, is governed by a mayor designated as its local chief executive and by a municipal council as its legislative body in accordance with the Local Government Code. The mayor, vice mayor, and the councilors are elected directly by the people through an election which is being held every three years.

=== Municipal Elected Officials ===
Members of the Municipal Council (2025–2028)
| Position | Name |
|---|---|
| Congressman | Ferdinand Alexander A. Marcos III |
| Mayor | Richard A. Degala |
| Vice-Mayor | Maribel A. Albano |
| Councilors | Randy A. Degala |
| Councilors | Maricel B. Foronda |
| Councilors | Amando Federico E. Ong II |
| Councilors | John R. Agbayani Jr. |
| Councilors | Rhome Arlyn B. Pacis |
| Councilors | Chad Ignatius Roman M. Alviar |
| Councilors | Irene P. Caluya |
| Councilors | Josey Florian C. Foronda |

=== Municipal seal ===
- The shield is derived from the provincial seal of Ilocos Norte.
- The letter V stands for the word Vintar, the name of the municipality.
- The eagle represents the native hawk, commonly called Siwawer by the old folks and after which the people of Vintar are referred to.
- Landscape, plow, rice stalk, onion, garlic, mango, eggplant and tobacco leaf, at the left side of the shield representing the municipality's principal farming industries.
- Dam, gate valve, water and fish at the right side of the shield represent Vintar-Laoag-Bacarra irrigation system. The dam also stands for the Umok ni Siwawers, a resort the town is famous for; the fish symbolizes one of the main income-generating products of the locality.

== Education ==
There are two schools district offices which govern all public and private schools within the municipality. These are Vintar I School District Office, and Vintar II School District Office.

=== Primary and elementary schools ===
- Abkir Elementary School
- Alejo Malasig Elementary School
- Alsem Elementary School
- Andres Agpalza Memorial Learning Center
- Bago Elementary School
- Bulbulala Primary School
- Cabayo Elementary School
- Cabangaran Elementary School
- Cabisuculan-Columbia Elementary School
- Canaam Elementary School
- Columbia Primary School
- Danao Elementary School
- Dasar Elementary School
- Dimamaga Elementary School
- Dipilat Elementary School
- Esperanza Elementary School
- Ester Elementary School
- Gubang Elementary School
- Isic-Isic Elementary School
- Lipay Elementary School
- Lubnac Elementary School
- Mabanbanag Primary School
- Magabobo Elementary School
- Malampa Elementary School
- Manarang Elementary School
- Margaay Primary School
- Masadsaduel Elementary School
- Namoroc-Mabanbanag Elementary School
- Parparoroc Elementary School
- Parut Elementary School
- Sagpat Elementary School
- Salsalamagui Elementary School
- Saricao Elementary School
- Tamdagan Elementary School
- Tungel Elementary School
- Vintar Central Elementary School
- Visaya Elementary School

=== Secondary schools ===
- Florentino Camaquin Integrated School
- Isic-Isic National High School
- Pallas Integrated School
- Salpad Integrated School
- Vintar Academy
- Vintar National High School
- Saint Nicholas Academy
