= 1983 Luzon earthquake =

Earthquake in the Philippines

- UTC time: 1983-08-17 12:17:57
- ISC event: 570383
- USGS-ANSS: ComCat
- Local date: August 17, 1983
- Local time: 20:17:56 PST
- Duration: 20 seconds
- Magnitude: 6.5 M_{s}
- Depth: 28.8 km (18 mi)
- Epicenter: 18.231°N 120.860°E
- Areas affected: Philippines
- Max. intensity: MMI VIII (Severe)
- Casualties: 16 killed, 47 injured

On August 17, 1983, at 20:17 PST (UTC+08:00), an earthquake struck the island of Luzon in the Philippines. The shock had a surface wave magnitude of 6.5 and a maximum Mercalli intensity of VIII (Severe), killing 16 people and injuring 47. Seven towns were damaged, several buildings collapsed, and electricity was cut off in Laoag. Features like sand volcanoes and cracks formed during the quake.

== Damage and casualties ==
The earthquake struck at 8:18 PM and had a surface wave magnitude of 6.5. It was the most powerful earthquake to strike the Philippines in seven years. Shaking lasted 20 seconds and damaged seven towns extensively, its greatest damage occurring near Pasuquin, Laoag, Sarrat, and Batac in Ilocos Norte province.

Early reports claimed that 17 were killed and 80 were injured, but these numbers were later revised to 16 and 47, respectively. A four-storey building collapsed, and the salesmen inside waited as long as 17 hours to be rescued; one man was rescued only to die in the hospital. Two or three other buildings also collapsed, including one filled with people in San Nicolas. Churches were damaged in Bacarra, Vintar, and Sarrat; the Sarrat church was the site of the wedding of Ferdinand Marcos' daughter Irene, and it toppled, destroying its altar and the orchestra loft from the wedding. A 300-year-old statue of Saint Monica fell apart, and its head landed on the ground intact. Electricity was cut off in Laoag, and downed a bridge elsewhere.

Sand volcanoes and cracks as long as 24 m (79 ft) formed, and as it ruptured, soil liquefaction and landslides occurred. A tsunami was reported but never confirmed. Tremors also extended to Manila.

== Geology ==
The earthquake occurred exactly seven years after the 1976 Moro Gulf earthquake, which measured 7.9 M_{s} and caused about 8,000 deaths.

PAGASA listed its magnitude at 5.7, but the United States Geological Survey still lists it at 6.5. It was assigned a Rossi–Forel scale rating of VII (Very strong tremor), indicating the potential to be damaging.

== Aftermath ==
In the destroyed church in Bacarra, church members wrote notes asking God for forgiveness and believing it was his warning. Reports from Manila's radio stations claimed many casualties, and a news agency reported that there were at least 100 people trapped in a downed building. The wrecks of collapsed buildings were searched, and the dead were removed from the rubble. There were two aftershocks following the main shock.

== See also ==
- List of earthquakes in 1983
- List of earthquakes in the Philippines
