= Bacarra Church =

Roman Catholic church in Ilocos Norte, Philippines

- Saint Andrew the Apostle Parish Church
- San Andres Apostol Parish Church
- Iglesia Parroquial de San Andrés Apóstol (Spanish)
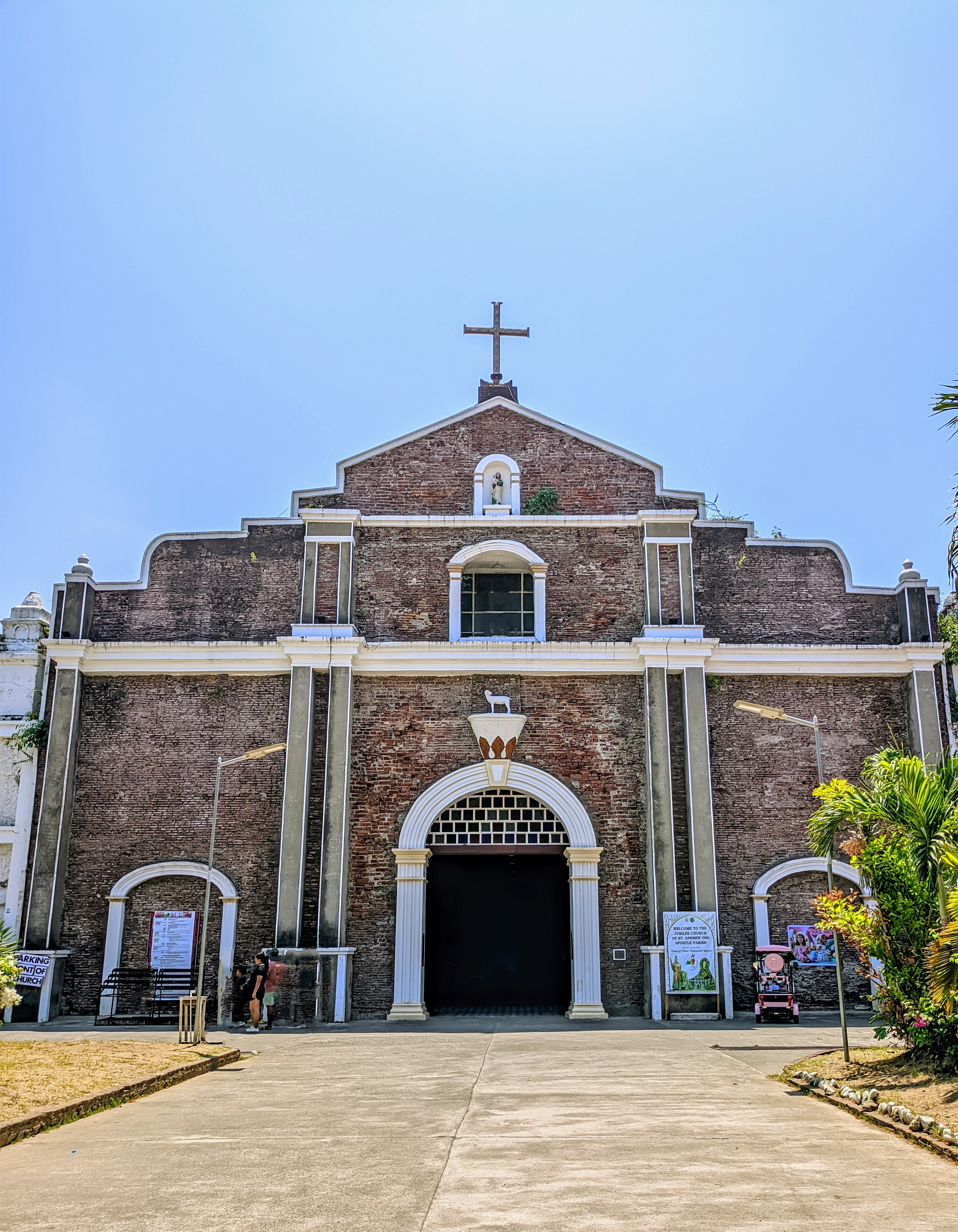
- Church facade in 2025

- Location in Luzon Location in the Philippines
- 18°15′02″N 120°36′42″E
- Location: M. Castro Street, Brgy. Sta. Rita, Bacarra, Ilocos Norte
- Country: Philippines
- Denomination: Roman Catholic

History
- Status: Parish church
- Dedication: Saint Andrew the Apostle

Architecture
- Functional status: Active
- Heritage designation: National Cultural Treasure
- Designated: August 1, 1973; 52 years ago (thru PD No. 260, s. 1973)
- Style: Church building
- Completed: 1593; 433 years ago

Administration
- Province: Nueva Segovia
- Metropolis: Nueva Segovia
- Archdiocese: Nueva Segovia
- Diocese: Laoag

Clergy
- Archbishop: David William Antonio
- Bishop: Renato P. Mayugba

Saint Andrew the Apostle Parish, commonly known as Bacarra Church, is a Roman Catholic church located in the municipality of Bacarra, Ilocos Norte, Philippines. It falls under the ecclesiastical jurisdiction of the Diocese of Laoag.

Founded in 1593 by Augustinian friars, the church was declared a National Historical Landmark by the National Historical Commission of the Philippines, and a National Cultural Treasure by the National Museum of the Philippines. Its key feature is its domeless, leaning bell tower located just meters from the church.

== History ==
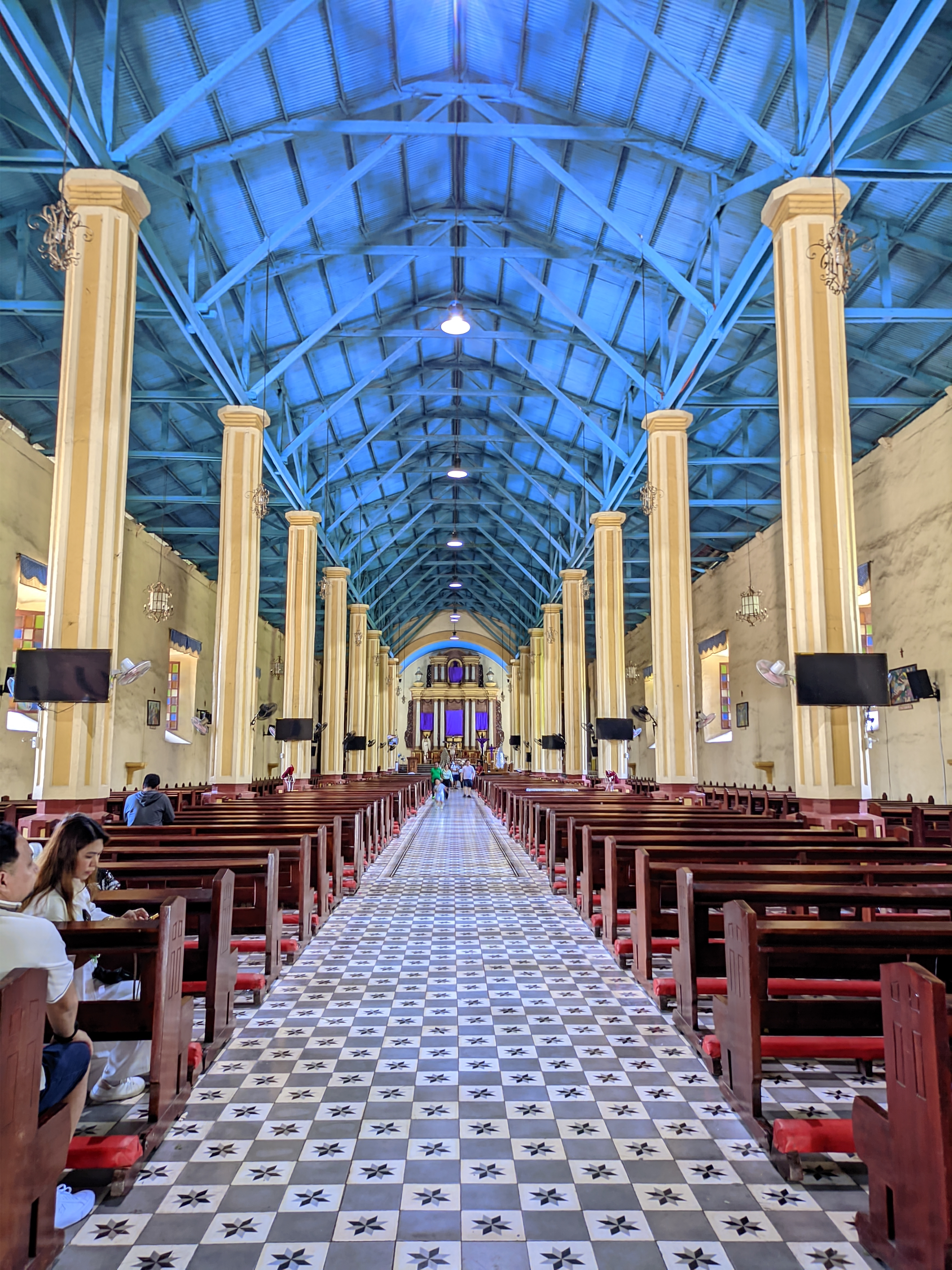
Church interior in 2025

The Augustinians founded the town of Bacarra on September 18, 1590, and began their missionary activity on land owned by a chieftain the Spaniards named Castillo and a certain Andres Hermosa. Baccara was established as a mission center for the Apayaos. The Augustinian mission was run by two priests serving a population of 4,000. The church and an adjoining convent were established in 1593 on the site where an Igorot named Bacsalandoc, first settler of the town and chieftain, had erected his hut. The church site is now located in the center of town.

The town became a visita of Laoag in 1603 and an independent parish in 1614. In 1782 a new church on the site was inaugurated by the Augustinians.

In 1973, President Ferdinand Marcos declared the church to be a National Cultural Treasure through Presidential Decree No. 260.

== Features ==
=== Bell tower ===
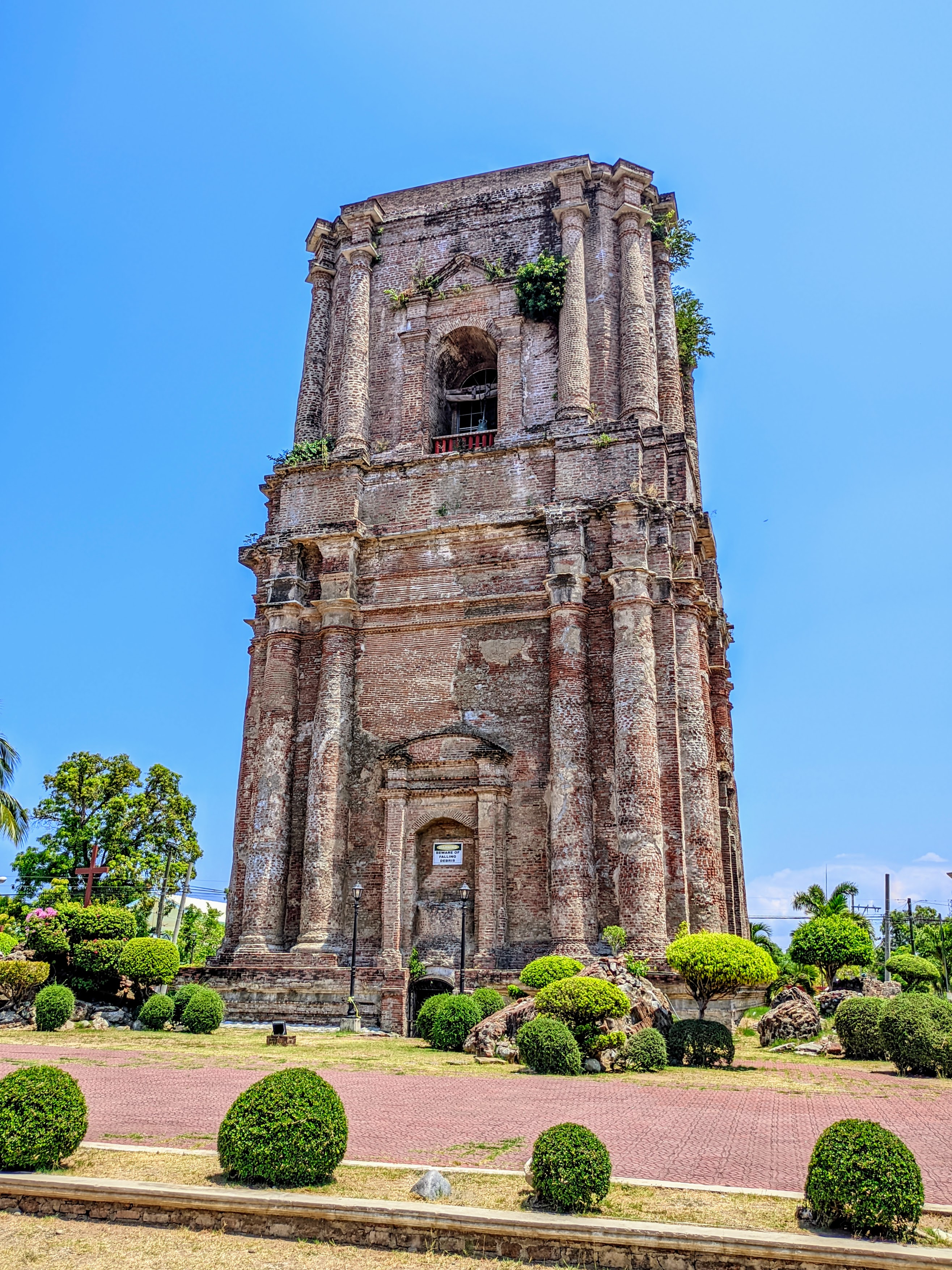
The domeless bell tower of Bacarra

The Bacarra church is famous for its centuries-old, domeless or "beheaded" belfry known as Torre ti Bacarra. The structure stands three stories and 50 metres (160 ft) high. The original bell tower, which is detached from the main church building and made of coral bricks, was erected in 1828. However, periodic earthquakes from 1931 to 1971 caused the dome to start leaning. The entire dome was toppled by the 1983 Luzon earthquake. Restoration of the church was completed in 1984 at a cost of ₱3 million.

The tower is also known as the "Acrobatic Bell Tower of Bacarra".

Restoration works by the National Historical Commission of the Philippines on the tower were announced in 2018, and the restored tower was turned over to the Diocese of Laoag in November 2020.

=== Church museum ===
The church museum, known as Museo de Bacarra, is housed in the former church convent. The two-story restored convent, which dates to the Spanish colonial era, features religious artifacts from archival photos and documents and church relics and cultural artifacts mostly contributed by the people of Bacarra. A mysterious underground staircase leading to three tunnels – believed to be connected to the Bacarra river, the church tower, and the altar – was uncovered at the back of the old convent.

== Bibliography ==
- Coseteng, Alice M. L. (1972). Spanish Churches in the Philippines. UNESCO National Commission of the Philippines.
- Galende, Pedro (2007). Philippine Church Façades. Manila: San Agustin Museum. ISBN 9789710724338.
- Esguerra, George (2012). The Borough of Licab. Trafford Publishing. ISBN 9781426955990.
