= Rodolfo Fariñas =

Filipino politician

The Honorable Rodolfo C. Fariñas
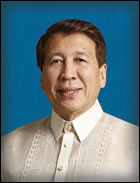
- Official portrait, 2013

House Majority Leader
- In office July 25, 2016 – July 23, 2018
- Preceded by: Neptali Gonzales II
- Succeeded by: Fredenil Castro

Member of the House of Representatives from Ilocos Norte's 1st district
- In office June 30, 2010 – June 30, 2019
- Preceded by: Roque Ablan Jr.
- Succeeded by: Ria Christina Fariñas
- In office June 30, 1998 – June 30, 2001
- Preceded by: Roque Ablan Jr.
- Succeeded by: Roque Ablan Jr.

23rd Governor of Ilocos Norte
- In office February 2, 1988 – June 30, 1998
- Vice Governor: Rolando Abadilla (1988–1992); Mariano Nalupta Jr. (1992–1998)
- Preceded by: Vicente Rubio Campos
- Succeeded by: Bongbong Marcos

Mayor of Laoag
- In office March 3, 1980 – March 25, 1986

Personal details
- Born: Rodolfo Castro Fariñas; September 5, 1951 (age 75) Manila, Philippines
- Party: Reporma (2021–present)
- Other political affiliations: PDP–Laban (2017–2021); Liberal (2015–2017); Nacionalista (2009–2015); Lakas (1995–1998); Independent (1992–1995; 1998–2009); KBL (1980–1992)
- Spouse: Maria Teresa Carlson (m. 1983; died 2001)
- Children: 8, including Ria Christina
- Education: Ateneo de Manila University (AB, LL.B)

Rodolfo "Rudy" Castro Fariñas, Sr. (born September 5, 1951) is a Filipino lawyer, politician and the former Majority Floor Leader of the House of Representatives of the Philippines and represents the 1st District of Ilocos Norte, the Philippines. Fariñas was the last person to serve as governor of Ilocos Norte who was not related to the Marcos family. Fariñas has been described as a "henchman of the Marcos regime".

== Early life and education ==
Fariñas was born on September 5, 1951. In 1971, he obtained a Bachelor of Arts (AB) degree from Ateneo de Manila University. He studied law and graduated from the Ateneo de Manila Law School in 1978. He placed 8th in the 1978 Philippine Bar Examinations with an 89.90% bar rating.

== Political career ==
Fariñas was elected as City Mayor of Laoag in the election of January 30, 1980, at the age of 28 making him one of the youngest elected city mayors in the Philippines. During his administration, he implemented several infrastructural projects. The city government was also administered more closely which resulted in an increase in its revenues. Fariñas's prominence increased in the national scene after the 1986 People Power Revolution when the people of Laoag rallied to reject any efforts by the government to replace him as the city mayor.

Fariñas was elected as provincial governor of Ilocos Norte in the 1988 local election where he won in a landslide victory. He was elected again in 1992 and 1995, serving for ten consecutive years. During his term, Fariñas held various posts and chairmanships like national president of JAYCEES, regional chairman of Ilocos Region Peace and Order Council (RPOC) and Reserve Officer's League of the Philippines (ROLP). He also received various awards and commendations, including the Most Outstanding Provincial Governor, 1988, and Most Outstanding Governor Award of the Year, 1996.

In July 1993, Fariñas was preventively suspended as governor for 60 days by President Fidel V. Ramos due to him facing charges of oppression and abuse of authority in court among others. The suspension was given at the recommendation of executive secretary Teofisto Guingona and presidential legal counsel Antonio Carpio.

While he was governor, Fariñas created a Department of Public Safety for medical emergencies and established the Capitol Day Care Center. He also oversaw infrastructure projects like a new building at the Gov. Roque Ablan Hospital, the Centennial Arena and Olympic size swimming pool, and restoration of the Rizal Amusement Park.

After completing his three consecutive terms as governor of the province, Fariñas won a seat in the 1998 local polls as Ilocos Norte's First District congressman.

In September 2017, Fariñas stated the members of the Congress should be immune from apprehension when committing minor traffic violations, a policy he said would aid them in their jobs. This was backed by the Metropolitan Manila Development Authority (MMDA).

== Personal life ==
Fariñas was married to the commercial model turned actress Maria Teresa L. Gerodias from Zambales. They have six children together, including Ria Christina, the former representative of 1st District of the Ilocos Norte. Before his marriage to Carlson, he had two children with Janet Murrf: Rica Camille and Rey Carlos.

Due to alleged cases of domestic violence, Carlson committed suicide on November 23, 2001. Her death became the foundation of Republic Act 9262 or the Anti-Violence Against Women and Children Act. Fariñas denies the accusations.

On November 15, 2015, Fariñas's 20-year-old son, Rodolfo Fariñas Jr., died in a motorcycle accident in Bacarra.

House of Representatives of the Philippines
Preceded by Roque Ablan Jr.	Member of the House of Representatives from Ilocos Norte's 1st district 2010–2019	Succeeded by Ria Christina Fariñas
Preceded by Roque Ablan Jr.	Member of the House of Representatives from Ilocos Norte's 1st district 1998–2001	Succeeded by Roque Ablan Jr.
Preceded by Neptali Gonzales II	House Majority Leader; 2016–2018	Succeeded by Fredenil Castro
Political offices
Preceded by Castor Raval (OIC)	Governor of Ilocos Norte; 1988–1998	Succeeded by Bongbong Marcos
