= Dumalneg =

Municipality in Ilocos Norte, Philippines

- Municipality
- Municipality of Dumalneg
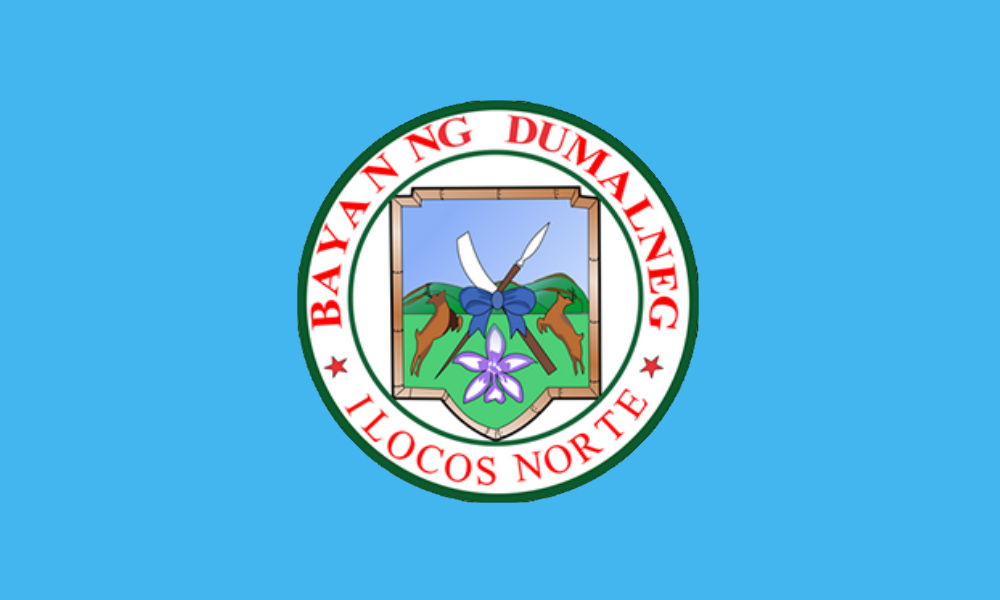
- Flag Seal

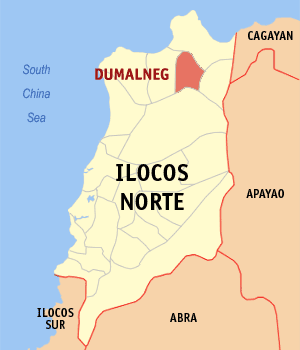
- Map of Ilocos Norte with Dumalneg highlighted

- Location within the Philippines
- Coordinates: 18°31′18″N 120°48′42″E
- Country: Philippines
- Region: Ilocos Region
- Province: Ilocos Norte
- District: 1st district
- Barangays: 4 (see Barangays)

Government
  - Type: Sangguniang Bayan
  - Mayor: Francisco R. Espiritu Jr.
  - Vice Mayor: Fraincess Kwyn Espiritu
  - Representative: Ferdinand Alexander Araneta Marcos III
  - Municipal Council: Members: Estrelia T. Bacong; Alexander R. Bunay; Sheryll L. Asipil; Alejo M. Laguitan Jr.; Karlene C. Alawag; Jaime A. Agreda; Mavie Mae B. Cadiz; Santos P. Cascayan Jr.
  - Electorate: 2,177 voters (2025)

Area
  - Total: 88.48 km^{2} (34.16 sq mi)
- Elevation: 241 m (791 ft)
- Highest elevation: 995 m (3,264 ft)
- Lowest elevation: 0 m (0 ft)

Population (2024 census)
  - Total: 3,452
  - Density: 39.01/km^{2} (101.0/sq mi)
  - Households: 687

Economy
  - Income class: 4th municipal income class
  - Poverty incidence: 7.35% (2023)
  - Revenue: ₱ 129.4 million (2024)
  - Assets: ₱ 391.7 million (2024)
  - Expenditure: ₱ 83.03 million (2024)
  - Liabilities: ₱ 40.02 million (2024)

Service provider
  - Electricity: Ilocos Norte Electric Cooperative (INEC)
- Time zone: UTC+8 (PST)
- ZIP code: 2921
- PSGC: 0102810000
- IDD : area code: +63 (0)77
- Native languages: Ilocano; Tagalog

Dumalneg, officially the Municipality of Dumalneg (Ilocano: Ili ti Dumalneg; Filipino: Bayan ng Dumalneg), is a municipality in the province of Ilocos Norte, Philippines. According to the 2024 census, it has a population of 3,452 people.

Dumalneg was composed of only a single barangay of the same name until August 10, 2012, when the Supreme Court ruled in favor of Dumalneg in its territorial dispute with neighboring Bangui over the jurisdiction of Barangay San Isidro. The writ of execution in this regard was issued in 2013.

== Geography ==
The Municipality of Dumalneg is bordered by Pagudpud to the north; Adams to the east; Vintar to the south, and Bangui to the west. It is a land-locked municipality with an area covering 88.48 km^{2}. Nearly all parts of Dumalneg are mountainous.

Dumalneg is situated 71.24 kilometres (44.27 mi) from the provincial capital Laoag, and 556.75 kilometres (345.95 mi) from the country's capital city of Manila.

=== Barangays ===
Dumalneg is politically divided in 4 barangays. Each barangay consists of puroks and some have sitios.

- Cabaritan
- Kalaw
- Quibel
- San Isidro

The former Barangay Dumalneg was split into Barangay Cabaritan, Barangay Kalaw, and Barangay Quibel pursuant to Republic Act No. 10955, which was ratified through a plebiscite conducted by the COMELEC on March 24, 2018.

=== Climate ===
Climate data for Dumalneg, Ilocos Norte
Month	Jan	Feb	Mar	Apr	May	Jun	Jul	Aug	Sep	Oct	Nov	Dec	Year
Mean daily maximum °C (°F)	26 (79)	28 (82)	30 (86)	32 (90)	31 (88)	31 (88)	30 (86)	30 (86)	30 (86)	29 (84)	28 (82)	26 (79)	29 (85)
Mean daily minimum °C (°F)	20 (68)	20 (68)	21 (70)	23 (73)	25 (77)	25 (77)	25 (77)	25 (77)	24 (75)	23 (73)	22 (72)	21 (70)	23 (73)
Average precipitation mm (inches)	55 (2.2)	41 (1.6)	37 (1.5)	41 (1.6)	184 (7.2)	215 (8.5)	261 (10.3)	256 (10.1)	245 (9.6)	216 (8.5)	142 (5.6)	129 (5.1)	1,822 (71.8)
Average rainy days	14.1	11.1	11.8	12.5	21.8	25.2	25.5	24.9	23.8	18.2	16.4	17.0	222.3
Source: Meteoblue

== Demographics ==
Population census of Dumalneg
Year	Pop.	±% p.a.
1939	322	—
1948	454	+3.89%
1960	554	+1.67%
1970	435	−2.39%
1975	570	+5.57%
1980	602	+1.10%
1990	828	+3.24%
1995	1,109	+5.63%
2000	1,486	+6.47%
2007	1,716	+2.00%
2010	1,814	+2.04%
2015	2,947	+9.68%
2020	3,087	+0.98%
2024	3,452	+2.72%
Source: Philippine Statistics Authority

In the 2024 census, the population of Dumalneg was 3,452 people, with a density of 39 inhabitants per square kilometre or 100 inhabitants per square mile.

Dumalneg's population is predominantly made up of Ilocano and Apayao people.

== Economy ==
Poverty incidence of Dumalneg (%)

Source: Philippine Statistics Authority

Agriculture is the main livelihood source of Dumalneg. Residents plant maliket, sweet potatoes, taro, and cassava. The municipality has various natural resources such as lumber, rattan, and firewood.

== Transportation ==
There are few jeepneys that are going to Dumalneg. Tricycles are the main transportation to the town. Dumalneg is a landlocked town, and the only way to get there is via the Dumalneg Road, starting on the highway in Barangay Lanao, Bangui, to the Town's Proper.

== Government ==
=== Local government ===
Dumalneg, belonging to the first congressional district of the province of Ilocos Norte, is governed by a mayor designated as its local chief executive and by a municipal council as its legislative body in accordance with the Local Government Code. The mayor, vice mayor, and the councilors are elected directly by the people through an election which is being held every three years.

=== Elected officials ===
Members of the Municipal Council (2025–2028)
Position	Name
Congressman	Ferdinand Alexander A. Marcos III
Mayor	Francisco R. Espiritu Jr.
Vice-Mayor	Fraincess Kwyn G. Espiritu
Councilors	Justine Francis King G. Espiritu
Councilors	Hector T. Balalio
Councilors	Alen Kristine Joy D. Bunay
Councilors	Anita B. Aguinaldo
Councilors	George A. Samalio
Councilors	Faustino D. Tomas
Councilors	Kristine May B. Tamana
Councilors	Danalyn T. Agron

== Tourism ==
There are few attractions in Dumalneg. Mainly the Bolo River, locally known as "Ar-ar-o", the place where peoples of Bangui and Pagudpud also going in the said river. Also the view of the mountains of Vintar are considered also the town's attraction.

== Education ==
The Bangui Schools District Office governs all public and private elementary and high schools within the Municipality of Dumalneg.

=== Elementary schools ===
- Dumalneg Elementary School
- San Isidro Elementary School

=== Secondary school ===
- Dumalneg National High School
