= Carasi =

Municipality in Ilocos Norte, Philippines

- Municipality
- Municipality of Carasi
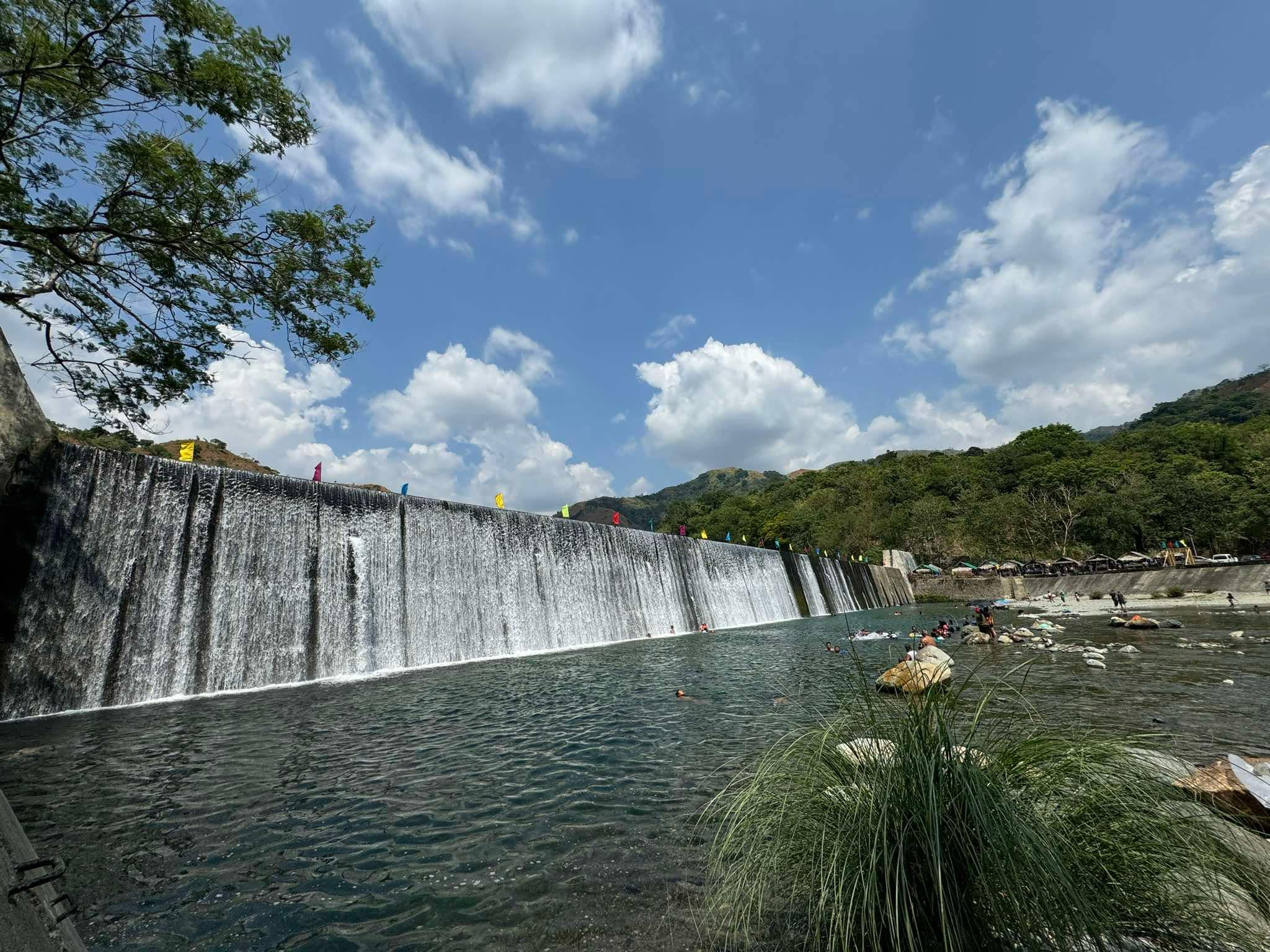
- Sabo Dam

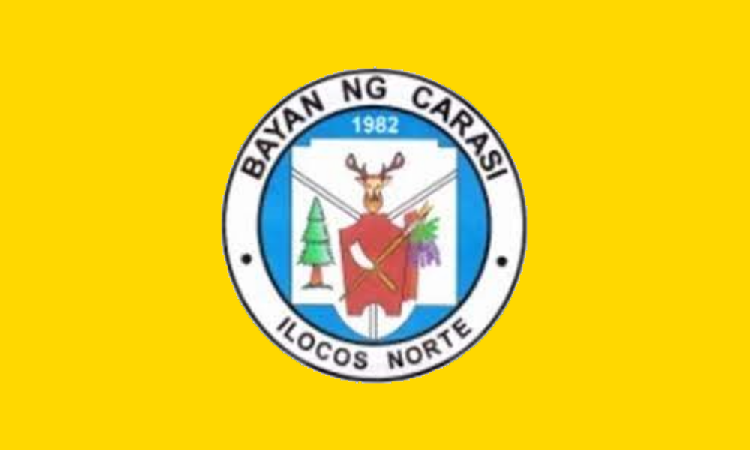
- Flag

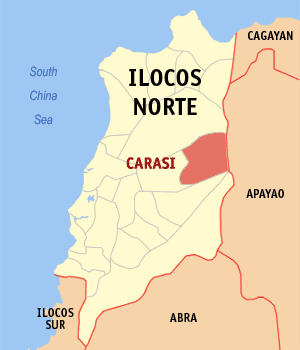
- Map of Ilocos Norte with Carasi highlighted
- Interactive map of Carasi
- Location within the Philippines
- Coordinates: 18°08′34″N 120°49′17″E
- Country: Philippines
- Region: Ilocos Region
- Province: Ilocos Norte
- District: 1st district
- Barangays: 3 (see Barangays)

Government
  - Type: Sangguniang Bayan
  - Mayor: Robella G. Gaspar
  - Vice Mayor: Wilson T. Bulil-lit
  - Representative: Ferdinand Alexander A. Marcos III
  - Municipal Council: Members: Eric P. Advincula; Julita B. Ulap; Pedro L. Opeña Jr.; Romy D. Salno; Menandro S. Julian; Resurreccion R. Pumaras Jr.; John R. Abril; Ramel J. Alubin
  - Electorate: 1,421 voters (2025)

Area
  - Total: 82.97 km^{2} (32.03 sq mi)
- Elevation: 228 m (748 ft)
- Highest elevation: 890 m (2,920 ft)
- Lowest elevation: 54 m (177 ft)

Population (2024 census)
  - Total: 1,775
  - Density: 21.39/km^{2} (55.41/sq mi)
  - Households: 344

Economy
  - Income class: 5th municipal income class
  - Poverty incidence: 6.43% (2023)
  - Revenue: ₱ 122.5 million (2024)
  - Assets: ₱ 261.8 million (2024)
  - Expenditure: ₱ 90.51 million (2024)
  - Liabilities: ₱ 33.75 million (2024)

Service provider
  - Electricity: Ilocos Norte Electric Cooperative (INEC)
- Time zone: UTC+8 (PST)
- ZIP code: 2911
- PSGC: 0102807000
- IDD : area code: +63 (0)77
- Native languages: Ilocano; Tagalog
- Website: www.carasi.gov.ph

Carasi, officially the Municipality of Carasi (Ilocano: Ili ti Carasi; Filipino: Bayan ng Carasi), is a municipality in the province of Ilocos Norte, Philippines. According to the 2024 census, it has a population of 1,775 people, making it the least populated municipality in the province and the entire Ilocos Region, and also the least populous in the island of Luzon.

== Geography ==
Carasi is a land-locked town situated in the eastern border of Ilocos Norte. Vintar is situated to the north of Carasi, Calanasan to the east, Nueva Era to the south, and Piddig to the west. Majority of the populated areas of the town are at the foot of the Cordillera Mountains.

Carasi is situated 32.33 kilometres (20.09 mi) from the provincial capital Laoag, and 508.08 kilometres (315.71 mi) from the country's capital city of Manila.

=== Barangays ===
Carasi is politically subdivided into 3 barangays. Each barangay consists of puroks and some have sitios.

- Angset
- Barbaqueso (Poblacion)
- Virbira

=== Climate ===
Climate data for Carasi, Ilocos Norte
Month	Jan	Feb	Mar	Apr	May	Jun	Jul	Aug	Sep	Oct	Nov	Dec	Year
Mean daily maximum °C (°F)	24 (75)	25 (77)	27 (81)	29 (84)	29 (84)	28 (82)	27 (81)	27 (81)	27 (81)	26 (79)	25 (77)	24 (75)	27 (80)
Mean daily minimum °C (°F)	17 (63)	17 (63)	19 (66)	20 (68)	22 (72)	23 (73)	22 (72)	22 (72)	22 (72)	21 (70)	20 (68)	18 (64)	20 (69)
Average precipitation mm (inches)	55 (2.2)	41 (1.6)	37 (1.5)	41 (1.6)	184 (7.2)	215 (8.5)	261 (10.3)	256 (10.1)	245 (9.6)	216 (8.5)	142 (5.6)	129 (5.1)	1,822 (71.8)
Average rainy days	14.1	11.1	11.8	12.5	21.8	25.2	25.5	24.9	23.8	18.2	16.4	17.0	222.3
Source: Meteoblue (Use with caution: this is modeled/calculated data, not measured locally.)

== Demographics ==
Population census of Carasi

Year	Pop.	±% p.a.
1939	261	—
1948	231	−1.35%
1960	222	−0.33%
1970	340	+4.35%
1975	374	+1.93%
1980	421	+2.39%
1990	632	+4.15%

Year	Pop.	±% p.a.
1995	750	+3.26%
2000	1,154	+9.68%
2007	1,435	+3.05%
2010	1,473	+0.96%
2015	1,567	+1.19%
2020	1,607	+0.53%
2024	1,775	+2.42%

Source: Philippine Statistics Authority

In the 2024 census, the population of Carasi was 1,775 people, with a density of 21 inhabitants per square kilometre or 54 inhabitants per square mile.

== Economy ==
Poverty incidence of Carasi (%)

Source: Philippine Statistics Authority

Carasi's main economic sector is agriculture, focusing on corn, root crops, and vegetables. Sabo Dam is also located in the municipality.

== Government ==
=== Local government ===
Carasi, belonging to the first congressional district of the province of Ilocos Norte, is governed by a mayor designated as its local chief executive and by a municipal council as its legislative body in accordance with the Local Government Code. The mayor, vice mayor, and the councilors are elected directly by the people through an election which is being held every three years.

=== Elected officials ===
Members of the Municipal Council (2025–2028)
Position	Name
Congressman	Ferdinand Alexander A. Marcos III
Mayor	Robella G. Gaspar
Vice-Mayor	Ma. Aleli T. Gaspar
Councilors	Juliet B. Opeña
Councilors	Sherwin G. Gaspar
Councilors	Romy D. Salno
Councilors	Miriam P. Tuldog
Councilors	Rey Transfiguracion
Councilors	Nestor S. Julian
Councilors	Eric P. Advincula
Councilors	Julita B. Ulap

=== Municipal seal ===
- Shield, denotes that Carasi is within the Province of Ilocos Norte
- Deer, represents hunting as means of livelihood of the townspeople
- Pine Tree, stands for the forest products that abound in the town
- Center Design, signifies defense and protection (shield); hardwork (bolo); and patriotism and bravery (spear).

== Education ==
The Piddig School District Office governs the public education system within the municipality.

=== List of schools ===
- Carasi Elementary School
- Carasi National High School
- Virvira-Angset Elementary School
