= Ilocos Norte's 1st congressional district =

Congressional district of the Philippines

- Constituency for the House of Representatives of the Philippines
- Location of Ilocos Norte within the Philippines
- Province: Ilocos Norte
- Region: Ilocos Region
- Population: 311,977 (2020)
- Electorate: 434,114 (2022)
- Major settlements: 12 LGUs: Cities; Laoag; Municipalities; Adams; Bacarra; Bangui; Burgos; Carasi; Dumalneg; Pagudpud; Pasuquin; Piddig; Sarrat; Vintar
- Area: 2,047.42 km^{2} (790.51 sq mi)

Current constituency
- Created: 1907
- Representative: Sandro Marcos
- Political party: Lakas
- Congressional bloc: Majority

Ilocos Norte's 1st congressional district is one of the two congressional districts of the Philippines in the province of Ilocos Norte. It has been represented in the House of Representatives of the Philippines since 1916 and earlier in the Philippine Assembly from 1907 to 1916. The district consists of the provincial capital city of Laoag and adjacent municipalities of Adams, Bacarra, Bangui, Burgos, Carasi, Dumalneg, Pagudpud, Pasuquin, Piddig, Sarrat and Vintar. It is currently represented in the 20th Congress by Sandro Marcos of the Lakas–CMD.

== List of members representing the district ==
=== Philippine Assembly (1907–1916) ===
| Portrait | Member (Lifespan) | Term of office | Party | Legislature | Electoral history | Constituencies |
|---|---|---|---|---|---|---|
District created January 9, 1907.
| | Irineo Javier (1866–1919) | October 16, 1907 – October 16, 1912 | Nacionalista | 1st Legislature | Elected in 1907. | 1907–1909; Bacarra, Bangui, Laoag, Pasuquin, Piddig, San Miguel |
| | Irineo Javier (1866–1919) | October 16, 1907 – October 16, 1912 | Nacionalista | 2nd Legislature | Re-elected in 1909. | 1909–1916; Bacarra, Bangui, Laoag, Pasuquin, Piddig, San Miguel, Vintar |
| | Santiago Fonacier (1885–1977) | October 16, 1912 – October 16, 1916 | Nacionalista | 3rd Legislature | Elected in 1912. | 1909–1916; Bacarra, Bangui, Laoag, Pasuquin, Piddig, San Miguel, Vintar |

=== House of Representatives (1916–1935) ===
| Portrait | Member (Lifespan) | Term of office | Party | Legislature | Electoral history | Constituencies |
|---|---|---|---|---|---|---|
| | Vicente T. Llanes (1887–1967) | October 16, 1916 – June 6, 1922 | Nacionalista | 4th Legislature | Elected in 1916. | 1916–1935; Bacarra, Bangui, Burgos, Laoag, Pasuquin, Piddig, Sarrat, Vintar |
| | Vicente T. Llanes (1887–1967) | October 16, 1916 – June 6, 1922 | Nacionalista | 5th Legislature | Re-elected in 1919. | 1916–1935; Bacarra, Bangui, Burgos, Laoag, Pasuquin, Piddig, Sarrat, Vintar |
| | Irineo Ranjo (1882–1948) | June 6, 1922 – June 2, 1925 | Nacionalista Colectivista | 6th Legislature | Elected in 1922. | 1916–1935; Bacarra, Bangui, Burgos, Laoag, Pasuquin, Piddig, Sarrat, Vintar |
| | Severo Hernando | June 2, 1925 – June 2, 1931 | Nacionalista Consolidado | 7th Legislature | Elected in 1925. | 1916–1935; Bacarra, Bangui, Burgos, Laoag, Pasuquin, Piddig, Sarrat, Vintar |
| | Severo Hernando | June 2, 1925 – June 2, 1931 | Nacionalista Consolidado | 8th Legislature | Re-elected in 1928. | 1916–1935; Bacarra, Bangui, Burgos, Laoag, Pasuquin, Piddig, Sarrat, Vintar |
| | Vicente T. Lazo | June 2, 1931 – November 15, 1935 | Nacionalista Consolidado | 9th Legislature | Elected in 1931. | 1916–1935; Bacarra, Bangui, Burgos, Laoag, Pasuquin, Piddig, Sarrat, Vintar |
| | Vicente T. Lazo | June 2, 1931 – November 15, 1935 | Nacionalista Democratico | 10th Legislature | Re-elected in 1934. | 1916–1935; Bacarra, Bangui, Burgos, Laoag, Pasuquin, Piddig, Sarrat, Vintar |

=== 1934 Constitutional Convention (1934–1935) ===
| Seat A | | | | | Seat B | | | | | Legislature | Constituencies |
| Portrait | Member (Lifespan) | Term of office | Party | Electoral history | Portrait | Member (Lifespan) | Term of office | Party | Electoral history | Legislature | Constituencies |
|---|---|---|---|---|---|---|---|---|---|---|---|
| | Maximino Bueno | July 30, 1934 – February 19, 1935 | Nonpartisan | Elected in 1934. | | Irineo Ranjo (1882–1948) | July 30, 1934 – February 19, 1935 | Nonpartisan | Elected in 1934. | 1934 Constitutional Convention | 1934–1935; Bacarra, Bangui, Burgos, Laoag, Pasuquin, Piddig, Sarrat, Vintar |

=== National Assembly (1935–1945) ===
==== Commonwealth ====
| Portrait | Member (Lifespan) | Term of office | Party | Legislature | Electoral history | Constituencies |
|---|---|---|---|---|---|---|
| | Vicente T. Lazo | November 15, 1935 – December 30, 1941 | Nacionalista Democratico | 1st National Assembly | Re-elected in 1935. | 1935–1941; Bacarra, Bangui, Burgos, Laoag, Pasuquin, Piddig, Sarrat, Vintar |
| | Vicente T. Lazo | November 15, 1935 – December 30, 1941 | Nacionalista | 2nd National Assembly | Re-elected in 1938. | 1935–1941; Bacarra, Bangui, Burgos, Laoag, Pasuquin, Piddig, Sarrat, Vintar |
District dissolved into the two-seat Ilocos Norte's at-large district for the Second Republic National Assembly.

=== House of Representatives (1945–1973) ===
| Portrait | Member (Lifespan) | Term of office | Party | Legislature | Electoral history | Constituencies |
|---|---|---|---|---|---|---|
District re-created May 24, 1945.
| | Vicente T. Lazo | June 9, 1945 – May 25, 1946 | Nacionalista | 1st Commonwealth Congress | Re-elected in 1941. | 1945–1961; Bacarra, Bangui, Burgos, Laoag, Pasuquin, Piddig, Sarrat, Vintar |
| | Damaso T. Samonte (1902–1994) | May 25, 1946 – December 30, 1949 | Liberal | 2nd Commonwealth Congress | Elected in 1946. | 1945–1961; Bacarra, Bangui, Burgos, Laoag, Pasuquin, Piddig, Sarrat, Vintar |
| | Damaso T. Samonte (1902–1994) | May 25, 1946 – December 30, 1949 | Liberal | 1st Congress | Elected in 1946. | 1945–1961; Bacarra, Bangui, Burgos, Laoag, Pasuquin, Piddig, Sarrat, Vintar |
| | Antonio Raquiza (1908–1999) | December 30, 1949 – December 30, 1955 | Liberal | 2nd Congress | Elected in 1949. | 1945–1961; Bacarra, Bangui, Burgos, Laoag, Pasuquin, Piddig, Sarrat, Vintar |
| | Antonio Raquiza (1908–1999) | December 30, 1949 – December 30, 1955 | Liberal | 3rd Congress | Re-elected in 1953. Resigned on election as Governor of Ilocos Norte. | 1945–1961; Bacarra, Bangui, Burgos, Laoag, Pasuquin, Piddig, Sarrat, Vintar |
| Vacant (December 30, 1955 – December 30, 1957) | | | | 3rd Congress | No special election held to fill vacancy. | 1945–1961; Bacarra, Bangui, Burgos, Laoag, Pasuquin, Piddig, Sarrat, Vintar |
| | Antonio Raquiza (1908–1999) | December 30, 1957 – August 24, 1966 | Liberal | 4th Congress | Re-elected in 1957. | 1945–1961; Bacarra, Bangui, Burgos, Laoag, Pasuquin, Piddig, Sarrat, Vintar |
| | Antonio Raquiza (1908–1999) | December 30, 1957 – August 24, 1966 | Liberal | 5th Congress | Re-elected in 1961. | 1961–1973; Bacarra, Bangui, Burgos, Laoag, Pagudpud, Pasuquin, Piddig, Sarrat, Vintar |
| | Antonio Raquiza (1908–1999) | December 30, 1957 – August 24, 1966 | Liberal | 6th Congress | Re-elected in 1965. Resigned on appointment as Secretary of Public Works, Transportation and Communications. | 1961–1973; Bacarra, Bangui, Burgos, Laoag, Pagudpud, Pasuquin, Piddig, Sarrat, Vintar |
| Vacant (August 24, 1966 – January 22, 1968) | | | | 6th Congress | — | 1961–1973; Bacarra, Bangui, Burgos, Laoag, Pagudpud, Pasuquin, Piddig, Sarrat, Vintar |
| | Roque Ablan Jr. (1932–2018) | January 22, 1968 – January 17, 1973 | Nacionalista | 6th Congress | Elected in 1967 to finish Raquiza's term. | 1961–1973; Bacarra, Bangui, Burgos, Laoag, Pagudpud, Pasuquin, Piddig, Sarrat, Vintar |
| | Roque Ablan Jr. (1932–2018) | January 22, 1968 – January 17, 1973 | Nacionalista | 7th Congress | Re-elected in 1969. Term cut short upon the ratification of a new Constitution. | 1961–1973; Bacarra, Bangui, Burgos, Laoag, Pagudpud, Pasuquin, Piddig, Sarrat, Vintar |
District dissolved into the twelve-seat Region I's at-large district for the Interim Batasang Pambansa, followed by the two-seat Ilocos Norte's at-large district for the Regular Batasang Pambansa.

=== 1971 Constitutional Convention (1971–1972) ===
| Seat A | | | | | Seat B | | | | | Legislature | Constituencies |
| Portrait | Member (Lifespan) | Term of office | Party | Electoral history | Portrait | Member (Lifespan) | Term of office | Party | Electoral history | Legislature | Constituencies |
|---|---|---|---|---|---|---|---|---|---|---|---|
| | Antonio Raquiza (1908–1999) | June 1, 1971 – November 29, 1972 | Nonpartisan | Elected in 1970. | | Federico Ablan Sr. | June 1, 1971 – November 29, 1972 | Nonpartisan | Elected in 1970. | 1971 Constitutional Convention | 1971–1972; Bacarra, Bangui, Burgos, Laoag, Pagudpud, Pasuquin, Piddig, Sarrat, Vintar |

=== House of Representatives (1987–present) ===
| Portrait | Member (Lifespan) | Term of office | Party | Legislature | Electoral history | Constituencies |
|---|---|---|---|---|---|---|
District re-created February 2, 1987.
| | Roque Ablan Jr. (1932–2018) | June 30, 1987 – June 30, 1998 | KBL | 8th Congress | Elected in 1987. | 1987–present Adams, Bacarra, Bangui, Burgos, Carasi, Dumalneg, Laoag, Pagudpud, Pasuquin, Piddig, Sarrat, Vintar |
| | Roque Ablan Jr. (1932–2018) | June 30, 1987 – June 30, 1998 | KBL | 9th Congress | Re-elected in 1992. | 1987–present Adams, Bacarra, Bangui, Burgos, Carasi, Dumalneg, Laoag, Pagudpud, Pasuquin, Piddig, Sarrat, Vintar |
| | Roque Ablan Jr. (1932–2018) | June 30, 1987 – June 30, 1998 | Lakas | 10th Congress | Re-elected in 1995. | 1987–present Adams, Bacarra, Bangui, Burgos, Carasi, Dumalneg, Laoag, Pagudpud, Pasuquin, Piddig, Sarrat, Vintar |
| | Rodolfo Fariñas (born 1951) | June 30, 1998 – June 30, 2001 | Independent | 11th Congress | Elected in 1998. | 1987–present Adams, Bacarra, Bangui, Burgos, Carasi, Dumalneg, Laoag, Pagudpud, Pasuquin, Piddig, Sarrat, Vintar |
| | Roque Ablan Jr. (1932–2018) | June 30, 2001 – June 30, 2010 | Lakas | 12th Congress | Elected in 2001. | 1987–present Adams, Bacarra, Bangui, Burgos, Carasi, Dumalneg, Laoag, Pagudpud, Pasuquin, Piddig, Sarrat, Vintar |
| | Roque Ablan Jr. (1932–2018) | June 30, 2001 – June 30, 2010 | Lakas | 13th Congress | Re-elected in 2004. | 1987–present Adams, Bacarra, Bangui, Burgos, Carasi, Dumalneg, Laoag, Pagudpud, Pasuquin, Piddig, Sarrat, Vintar |
| | Roque Ablan Jr. (1932–2018) | June 30, 2001 – June 30, 2010 | Lakas | 14th Congress | Re-elected in 2007. | 1987–present Adams, Bacarra, Bangui, Burgos, Carasi, Dumalneg, Laoag, Pagudpud, Pasuquin, Piddig, Sarrat, Vintar |
| | Rodolfo Fariñas (born 1951) | June 30, 2010 – June 30, 2019 | Nacionalista | 15th Congress | Elected in 2010. | 1987–present Adams, Bacarra, Bangui, Burgos, Carasi, Dumalneg, Laoag, Pagudpud, Pasuquin, Piddig, Sarrat, Vintar |
| | Rodolfo Fariñas (born 1951) | June 30, 2010 – June 30, 2019 | Liberal | 16th Congress | Re-elected in 2013. | 1987–present Adams, Bacarra, Bangui, Burgos, Carasi, Dumalneg, Laoag, Pagudpud, Pasuquin, Piddig, Sarrat, Vintar |
| | Rodolfo Fariñas (born 1951) | June 30, 2010 – June 30, 2019 | PDP–Laban | 17th Congress | Re-elected in 2016. | 1987–present Adams, Bacarra, Bangui, Burgos, Carasi, Dumalneg, Laoag, Pagudpud, Pasuquin, Piddig, Sarrat, Vintar |
| | Ria Christina Fariñas (born 1984) | June 30, 2019 – June 30, 2022 | PDP–Laban | 18th Congress | Elected in 2019. | 1987–present Adams, Bacarra, Bangui, Burgos, Carasi, Dumalneg, Laoag, Pagudpud, Pasuquin, Piddig, Sarrat, Vintar |
| | Sandro Marcos (born 1994) | June 30, 2022 – present | Nacionalista (until 2023) | 19th Congress | Elected in 2022. | 1987–present Adams, Bacarra, Bangui, Burgos, Carasi, Dumalneg, Laoag, Pagudpud, Pasuquin, Piddig, Sarrat, Vintar |
| | Sandro Marcos (born 1994) | June 30, 2022 – present | PFP | 19th Congress | Elected in 2022. | 1987–present Adams, Bacarra, Bangui, Burgos, Carasi, Dumalneg, Laoag, Pagudpud, Pasuquin, Piddig, Sarrat, Vintar |
| | Sandro Marcos (born 1994) | June 30, 2022 – present | PFP | 20th Congress | Re-elected in 2025. | 1987–present Adams, Bacarra, Bangui, Burgos, Carasi, Dumalneg, Laoag, Pagudpud, Pasuquin, Piddig, Sarrat, Vintar |
| | Sandro Marcos (born 1994) | June 30, 2022 – present | Lakas (from 2026) | 20th Congress | Re-elected in 2025. | 1987–present Adams, Bacarra, Bangui, Burgos, Carasi, Dumalneg, Laoag, Pagudpud, Pasuquin, Piddig, Sarrat, Vintar |

== Election results ==
=== 2010 ===
2010 Philippine House of Representatives elections in Ilocos Norte
| Party | Candidate | Votes | % |
|---|---|---|---|
| Nacionalista | Rodolfo Fariñas | 72,184 | 50.42 |
| Lakas–Kampi | Kristian Ablan | 40,303 | 28.15 |
| PMP | Reynolan Sales | 22,113 | 15.44 |
| KBL | Alfonso Ruiz | 5,175 | 3.61 |
| Liberal | Renato Peralta | 3,399 | 2.37 |
| Valid ballots | | 143,174 | 94.62 |
| Invalid or blank votes | | 8,145 | 5.38 |
| Total votes | | 151,319 | 100.00 |
| Nacionalista gain from Lakas–Kampi | | | |

=== 2013 ===
2013 Philippine House of Representatives elections in Ilocos Norte
| Party | Candidate | Votes | % |
|---|---|---|---|
| Nacionalista | Rodolfo Fariñas (incumbent) | 102,066 | 100.00 |
| Valid ballots | | 102,066 | 68.96 |
| Invalid or blank votes | | 45,935 | 31.04 |
| Total votes | | 148,001 | 100.00 |
| Nacionalista hold | | | |

=== 2016 ===
2016 Philippine House of Representatives elections in Ilocos Norte
| Party | Candidate | Votes | % |
|---|---|---|---|
| Liberal | Rodolfo Fariñas (incumbent) | 138,196 | 96.56 |
| KBL | Ryan Remigio | 3,213 | 2.24 |
| UNA | Ruel Mandac | 1,712 | 1.20 |
| Valid ballots | | 143,121 | 85.64 |
| Invalid or blank votes | | 24,004 | 14.36 |
| Total votes | | 167,125 | 100.00 |
| Liberal hold | | | |

=== 2019 ===
2019 Philippine House of Representatives elections in Ilocos Norte
| Party | Candidate | Votes | % |
|---|---|---|---|
| PDP–Laban | Ria Christina Fariñas | 106,780 | 69.89 |
| Nacionalista | Ryan Remigio | 46,012 | 30.11 |
| Total votes | | 152,792 | 100.00 |
| PDP–Laban hold | | | |

=== 2022 ===
2022 Philippine House of Representatives elections in Ilocos Norte
| Party | Candidate | Votes | % |
|---|---|---|---|
| Nacionalista | Sandro Marcos | 108,423 | 56.63 |
| PDP–Laban | Ria Christina Fariñas (incumbent) | 83,034 | 43.37 |
| Total votes | | 191,457 | 100.00 |
| Nacionalista gain from PDP–Laban | | | |

=== 2025 ===
2025 Philippine House of Representatives elections in Ilocos Norte
| Party | Candidate | Votes | % |
|---|---|---|---|
| PFP | Sandro Marcos (incumbent) | 169,880 | 100.00 |
| Total votes | | 169,880 | 100.00 |
| PFP hold | | | |

== See also ==
- Legislative districts of Ilocos Norte
