= Maria Teresa Carlson =

Filipino actress (1963–2001)

- Born: Maria Teresa L. Gerodias; October 15, 1962; Manila, Philippines
- Died: November 23, 2001 (aged 39); San Juan, Metro Manila, Philippines
- Other names: Tere; Maria
- Occupations: Actress; beauty pageant contestant
- Years active: 1980–1994
- Spouse: Rodolfo Fariñas (m. 1983)
- Children: 8 (2 daughters and 6 sons)

Maria Teresa L. Gerodias (October 15, 1962 – November 23, 2001), also known as Maria Teresa Carlson, was a Filipino-American actress and beauty pageant contestant.

== Early life ==
Carlson was born in Manila but grew up in San Francisco, California. At age of 16, she decided to stay in the Philippines when her family came on a visit. In 1979, she won Miss Young Philippines and represented the country in the Miss Young International Pageant in Tokyo.

== Career ==
She starred in several films, including comedies with Chiquito, Redford White, and with the trio of Tito, Vic and Joey. She popularized the line "Si Ako, Si Ikaw" on the hit sitcom Chicks to Chicks.

== Personal life ==
In 1983, Carlson married Rodolfo Fariñas. They have six children — one girl and five boys: Ria Christina (born 1984), Ryan Christopher, Rudys Caesar I, Rudys Caesar II, Rodolfo Jr. and Rodolfo III. Before Carlson, Rodolfo Fariñas also has other two children from a previous relationship with Janet Murff, namely Rica Camille and Rey Carlos.

=== Allegations of domestic violence against husband ===
In a Probe Team interview in October 1996, Carlson accused her husband, then the governor of Ilocos Norte, of domestic violence. She narrated:

"At the start, there would be occasional slapping on the face, physical abuse, beatings. He will box you... all over. I was subjected to water torture. I had a gun at me in my mouth... a wet towel all over my face, pour [sic] Sprite, 7-Up or continuous water... "I do not wish to embarrass him. I do not want humiliate him. I'm not out just for any money. I'm even willing to give up everything. I just want my freedom, and my independence. I want my annulment and I want what's due to me as my constitutional rights as a Filipino."

A week after, she appeared on the television program Magandang Gabi, Bayan, with her husband beside her and took back everything she had said against him. She told host Noli de Castro that she was just feeling insecure. "Baka dahil buntis po ako. Hindi ako maganda sa kanya. Puro motherhood, puro housewife na lang."

Before the 1996 allegations, Carlson had sought help from others.

=== Husband's response ===
Fariñas has reportedly denounced the women's organization KALAKASAN that intervened in Carlson's defense and accused the organization of "being lesbian-dominated".

== Death ==
On November 23, 2001, Carlson died by suicide by jumping off the balcony from the 23rd floor of the Platinum 2000 condominium in Greenhills, San Juan City.

== Legacy ==
Task Force Maria is a coalition of at least 23 women's and people's organizations formed after Carlson's suicide. TFM took the Commission on Human Rights (CHR) to task for failing to act on Carlson's publicized disclosures, and later worked to reconcile two domestic violence bills in Congress in a unity bill. On March 8, 2004, Gloria Macapagal Arroyo signed Republic Act 9262 or the Anti-Violence Against Women and Children Act. It shields victims with protection orders without having to file a case in court. It recognizes the battered woman syndrome as a defense.

== Filmography ==
=== Movies ===
Year	Title	Role
1980	Wander Woman Si Ako!	Wander Woman
1980	Six Million Centavo Man	
1982	Si Ako at... Tres Muskiteros!	Maria
1982	Forgive and Forget	Inez
1982	Mga Alagad ng Kuwadradong Mesa	Lady Di-Nabale
1983	Wrong Mistake	
1983	Johnny Tanggo Rides Again... Tatanga-tanga, Dakila Naman	
1985	High Blood	
1994	Iligpit Si Victor Saraza	

=== Television ===
Year	Title	Role
1984–1989	Chicks to Chicks	Tere
