= Ria Christina Fariñas =

Filipino politician

The Honorable Ria Christina G. Fariñas

Member of the Philippine House of Representatives from Ilocos Norte's 1st district
- In office June 30, 2019 – June 30, 2022
- Preceded by: Rodolfo Fariñas
- Succeeded by: Sandro Marcos

Member of the Ilocos Norte Provincial Board from the 1st district
- In office June 30, 2013 – June 30, 2019

Personal details
- Born: Ria Christina Gerodias Fariñas; March 6, 1984 (age 42) San Francisco, California, U.S.
- Party: PDP–Laban (2018–present)
- Other political affiliations: Nacionalista (2015–2018); Liberal (2012–2015)
- Children: 1
- Parent(s): Rodolfo Fariñas (father); Maria Teresa Carlson (mother)

Ria Christina Gerodias Fariñas (born March 6, 1984) is a Filipino politician who was elected as a member of the Ilocos Norte Provincial Board in 2013 and 2016, serving a six-year tenure, and represented Ilocos Norte's 1st congressional district in the Philippine House of Representatives from 2019 to 2022, failing to be reelected.

== Early and personal life ==
Ria Christina Fariñas was born on March 6, 1984, in San Francisco, California, to Filipino American actress Maria Teresa Carlson and politician Rodolfo Fariñas with five siblings, all boys. In 2001, her mother died by suicide, falling from the 23rd floor of her apartment building in Greenhills, San Juan. Through her Facebook friend and her relation with Carlson, she was a guest actress in several movies, including My Bestfriend's Girlfriend. In the early 2010s, she was the chief of staff of her father. She has one child named Natalia.

== Political career ==
In the 2013 Philippine general election, Fariñas ran for the Ilocos Norte Provincial Board independently. She planned to run under the Marcos' Nacionalista Party, but due to lack of slots, she ran independently and gained 1st, securing her first term as board member. In September 2014, while she was walking on church grounds in Ilocos Norte, she got hit by a car that accidentally accelerated, leading to the breaking of her collarbone and three ribs and the collapse of her lungs. In the 2016 Philippine general election, she ran for the 1st Provincial Board District again under the Liberal Party, gaining 1st with 127,111 votes. She was subsequently named president of the Provincial Board Members League of the Philippines.

In the 2019 Philippine House of Representatives elections, Fariñas ran for the 1st District of Ilocos Norte under the PDP–Laban party, winning with 106,780 votes against Marcos's ally Ryan Remigio of Nacionalista Party, with 46,012. On October 7, 2021, Fariñas filed her certificate of candidacy for the 2022 Philippine House of Representatives elections, seeking reelection under PDP–Laban. Her run placed her against Sandro Marcos under the Nacionalista Party, a member of the Marcos political family and son of presidential candidate Bongbong Marcos. Yet, faced with the network and resources of the Marcoses, Fariñas chose not to withdraw. In an April 2022 survey conducted by Grassroots Analytics PH, Fariñas was preferred by 56% while Marcos had 38%. On May 9, 2022, she was defeated by Sandro Marcos, receiving 83,034 (43.37%) votes.against Marcos' 108,423 (56.63%).

House of Representatives of the Philippines
Preceded by Rodolfo Fariñas	Member of the House of Representatives from Ilocos Norte's 1st district 2019–2022	Succeeded by Sandro Marcos
