= Bacarra =

Municipality in Ilocos Norte, Philippines

- Municipality
- Municipality of Bacarra
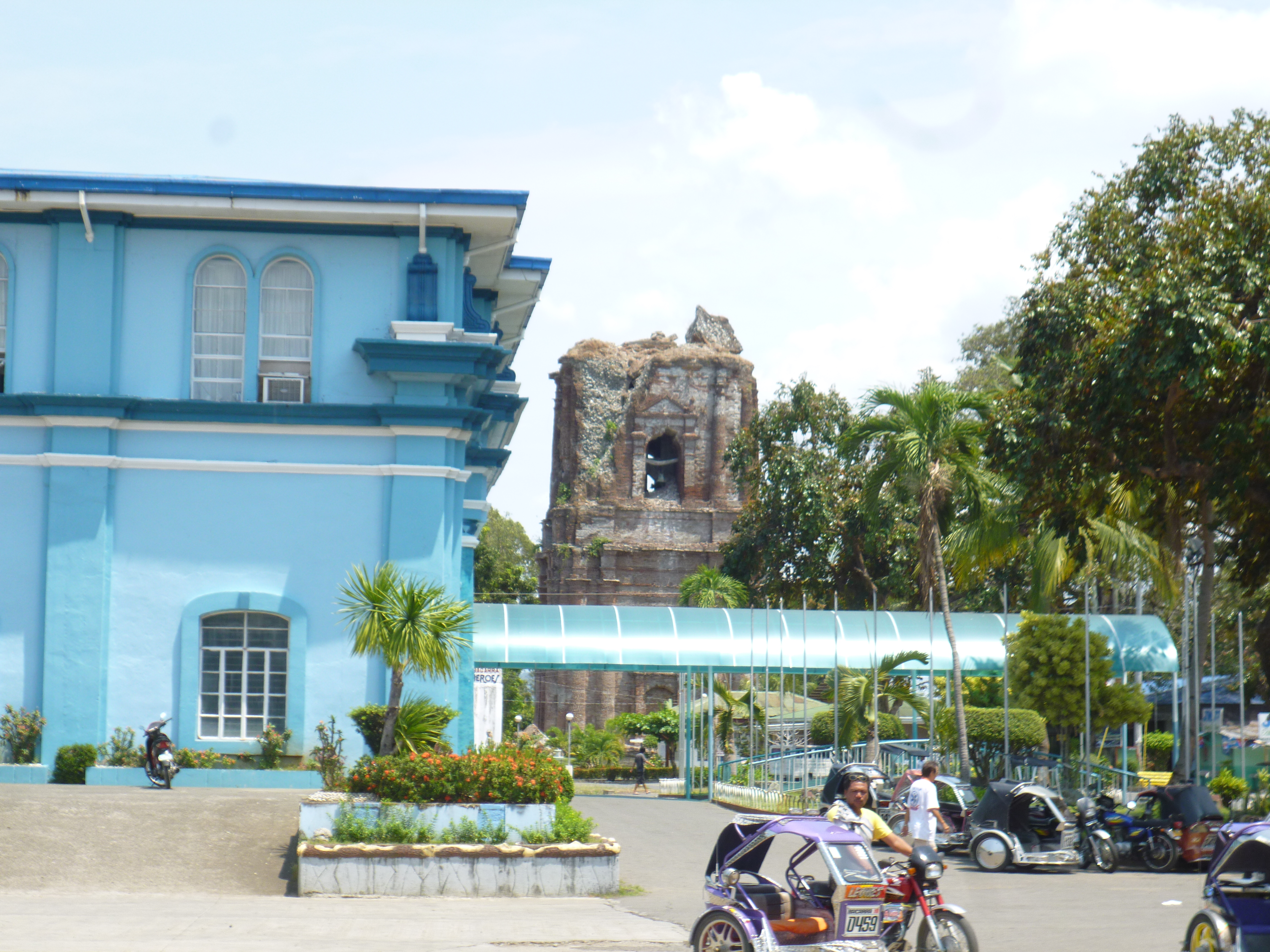
- Bacarra Municipal Hall

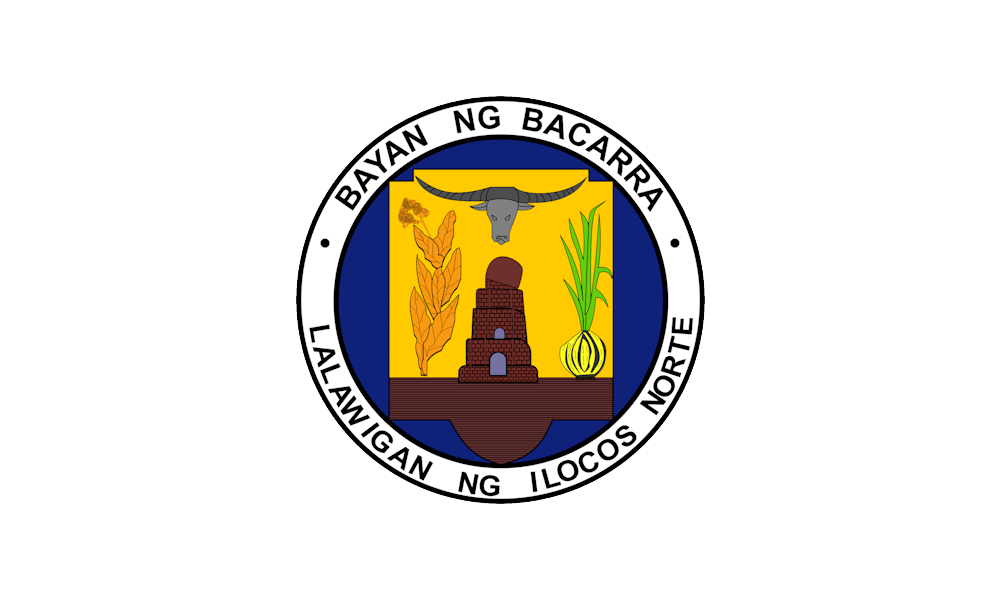
- Flag Seal

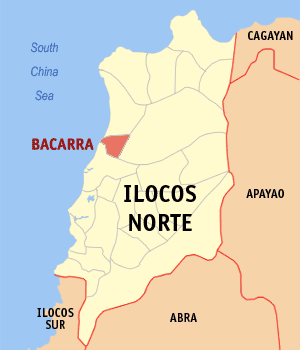
- Map of Ilocos Norte with Bacarra highlighted
- Interactive map of Bacarra
- Location within the Philippines
- Coordinates: 18°15′07″N 120°36′39″E
- Country: Philippines
- Region: Ilocos Region
- Province: Ilocos Norte
- District: 1st district
- Founded: 1778
- Barangays: 43 (see Barangays)

Government
  - Type: Sangguniang Bayan
  - Mayor: Nicomedes C. dela Cruz Jr.
  - Vice Mayor: Derek B. Velasco
  - Representative: Ferdinand Alexander A. Marcos III
  - Municipal Council: Members: Philip "Pepe" Fernandez; Victor Bolosan; Philip Mar Lazo; Lawrence Anthony "L.A." Gapasin; Winston C. Corpuz; Jonathan Daniel R. Sagario; Dinah Visaya Delos Angeles; George G. Padre; Liga Pres. Sidney L. Ramos; PPSK Pres. Reichel C. Faylogna
  - Electorate: 22,671 voters (2025)

Area
  - Total: 65.32 km^{2} (25.22 sq mi)
- Elevation: 26 m (85 ft)
- Highest elevation: 145 m (476 ft)
- Lowest elevation: 0 m (0 ft)

Population (2024 census)
  - Total: 32,734
  - Density: 501.1/km^{2} (1,298/sq mi)
  - Households: 8,620

Economy
  - Income class: 2nd municipal income class
  - Poverty incidence: 3.38% (2023)
  - Revenue: ₱ 255.3 million (2024)
  - Assets: ₱ 46.87 million (2024)
  - Expenditure: ₱ 196.7 million (2024)
  - Liabilities: ₱ 185.7 million (2024)

Service provider
  - Electricity: Ilocos Norte Electric Cooperative (INEC)
- Time zone: UTC+8 (PST)
- ZIP code: 2916
- PSGC: 0102802000
- IDD : area code: +63 (0)77
- Native languages: Ilocano; Tagalog
- Website: www.bacarra.gov.ph

Bacarra, officially the Municipality of Bacarra (Ilocano: Ili ti Bacarra; Tagalog: Bayan ng Bacarra) is a municipality in the province of Ilocos Norte, Philippines. According to the 2024 census, it has a population of 32,734 people.

== Geography ==
The Municipality of Bacarra is bounded by the Municipality of Pasuquin to the north, by Vintar to the east; by Laoag to the south; and on the west by the South China Sea. It is one of the municipalities with the smallest land area in the province.

Bacarra is situated 9.00 kilometres (5.59 mi) from the provincial capital Laoag, and 494.51 kilometres (307.27 mi) from the country's capital city of Manila.

=== Barangays ===
Bacarra is politically subdivided into 43 barangays. Each barangay consists of puroks and some have sitios.

- Bani
- Buyon
- Cabaruan
- Cabulalaan
- Cabusligan
- Cadaratan
- Calioet-Libong
- Casilian
- Corocor
- Duripes
- Ganagan
- Libtong
- Macupit
- Nambaran
- Natba
- Paninaan
- Pasiocan
- Pasngal
- Pipias
- Pulangi
- Pungto
- San Agustin I (Pob.)
- San Agustin II (Pob.)
- San Andres I (Pob.)
- San Andres II (Pob.)
- San Gabriel I (Pob.)
- San Gabriel II (Pob.)
- San Pedro I (Pob.)
- San Pedro II (Pob.)
- San Roque I (Pob.)
- San Roque II (Pob.)
- San Simon I (Pob.)
- San Simon II (Pob.)
- San Vicente (Pob.)
- Sangil
- Sta. Filomena I (Pob.)
- Sta. Filomena II (Pob.)
- Sta. Rita (Pob.)
- Sto. Cristo I (Pob.)
- Sto. Cristo II (Pob.)
- Tambidao
- Teppang
- Tubburan

=== Climate ===
Climate data for Bacarra, Ilocos Norte
Month	Jan	Feb	Mar	Apr	May	Jun	Jul	Aug	Sep	Oct	Nov	Dec	Year
Mean daily maximum °C (°F)	26 (79)	28 (82)	30 (86)	32 (90)	31 (88)	31 (88)	30 (86)	30 (86)	30 (86)	29 (84)	28 (82)	26 (79)	29 (85)
Mean daily minimum °C (°F)	20 (68)	20 (68)	21 (70)	23 (73)	25 (77)	25 (77)	25 (77)	25 (77)	24 (75)	23 (73)	22 (72)	21 (70)	23 (73)
Average precipitation mm (inches)	55 (2.2)	41 (1.6)	37 (1.5)	41 (1.6)	184 (7.2)	215 (8.5)	261 (10.3)	256 (10.1)	245 (9.6)	216 (8.5)	142 (5.6)	129 (5.1)	1,822 (71.8)
Average rainy days	14.1	11.1	11.8	12.5	21.8	25.2	25.5	24.9	23.8	18.2	16.4	17.0	222.3
Source: Meteoblue

== Demographics ==
Population census of Bacarra

Year	Pop.	±% p.a.
1918	14,478	—
1939	14,806	+0.11%
1948	15,851	+0.76%
1960	18,570	+1.33%
1970	20,736	+1.11%
1975	22,118	+1.30%
1980	23,371	+1.11%
1990	26,940	+1.43%

Year	Pop.	±% p.a.
1995	27,827	+0.61%
2000	29,668	+1.38%
2007	31,485	+0.82%
2010	31,648	+0.19%
2015	32,215	+0.34%
2020	33,496	+0.82%
2024	32,734	−0.55%

Source: Philippine Statistics Authority

In the 2024 census, the population of Bacarra was 32,734 people, with a density of 500 inhabitants per square kilometre or 1,300 inhabitants per square mile.

== Economy ==
Poverty incidence of Bacarra

Source: Philippine Statistics Authority

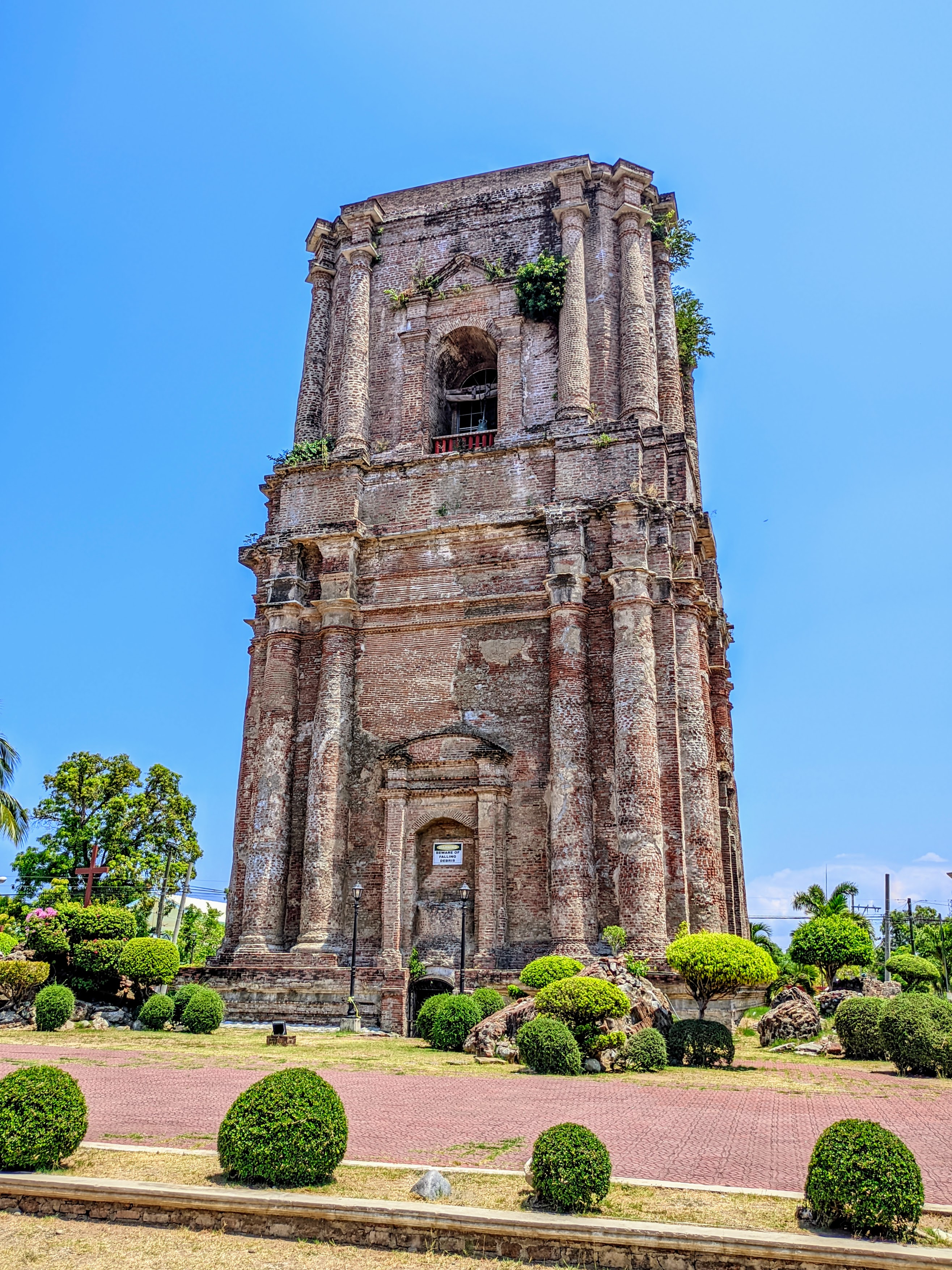
The Leaning Belfry of St. Andrew Church

Bacarra's main economic sector is agriculture. Farmers raise rice, garlic, tobacco, and onion. Bacarra's residents are engaging in fishing, woodworking, weaving, and manufacturing.

Bacarra is also known as one of the balikbayan towns of the Philippines and in the north.

== Government ==
Bacarra is part of the first congressional district of the province of Ilocos Norte. It is governed by a mayor designated as its local chief executive and by a municipal council as its legislative body in accordance with the Local Government Code. The mayor, vice mayor, and the councilors are elected directly by the people through an election which is being held every three years.

Elected officials, term of office: June 30, 2025 – June 30, 2028:

- Mayor: Nicomedes C. dela Cruz Jr.
- Vice Mayor & Presiding Officer: Derek B. Velasco
- 13th Sangguniang Bayan council members:
  - Philip "Pepe" Fernandez
  - Victor Bolosan
  - Philip Mar Lazo
  - Lawrence Anthony "L.A." Gapasin
  - Winston C. Corpuz
  - Jonathan Daniel R. Sagario
  - Dinah Visaya Delos Angeles
  - George G. Padre
- LIGA President & ex-officio member: Sidney L. Ramos
- PPSK President & ex-officio member: Reichel C. Faylogna

=== List of former town executives ===
1898–Present:

- Don Andres Lazo (1898-1903; 1903–1904; 1912–1916)
- Don Agustin Albano (1904-1905)
- Don Antonio Albano (1906-1907)
- Don Luis Albano (1908-1909)
- Don Enrique Albano (1910-1912)
- Don Macario Castro (1916-1919)
- Don Justo Dacuycuy (1919-1922)
- Don Rafael Albano (1922-1925)
- Don Benito Domingo (1925-1928)
- Don Candido Albano (1928-1931)
- Don Isabelo Ramones (1931-1934)
- Don Torcuato Ver (1935-1938)
- Don Leon Acierto (1939-1940)
- Don Juan Sales (1941-1944)
- Don Jacobo Ramiro (1945-1946)
- Don Justo A. Pilar (1946-1948; 1954-1955)
- Don Felix A. Rivera (1948-1951; 1960-1963)
- Don Andres M. Madamba (1952-1955)
- Don Antonio Guillermo (1952; 1956-1959)
- Don Sabas Sagisi (1964-1965)
- Don Aurelio Madariaga (1965-1967)
- Leonardo A. Velasco (01/01/1968-06/30/1986)
- Lorenzo Acoba (06/16/1986-03/01/1987)
- Jose C. Pilar Sr. (02/02/1988-06/30/1992)
- Pacifico C. Velasco (10/14/1987-11/30/1987(OIC); 07/01/1992-06/30/2001)
- Philip C. Velasco (03/02/1987-10/13/1987(OIC); 12/01/1987-02/02/1988(OIC); 07/01/2001-05/20/2007)
- Nicomedes C. dela Cruz Jr. (05/21/2007-06/30/2007(Acting); 07/01/2007–06/30/2019; 07/01/2022–present)
- Fritzie Ann Kaye dela Cruz Gapasin (07/01/2019–06/30/2022)

=== Municipal seal ===
The Bacarra Seal

- Shield, derived from the Provincial Seal of Ilocos Norte.
- Blue, symbolizing the incessant peace for love, justice equality and tranquility, the purity of heart and open mind of the people of Bacarra, Ilocos Norte towards progress. It also depicts the fervent hopes and prayers of the people to reach their goals in their pursuit for economic recovery through productivity and self-reliance.
- Yellow, representing the burning desire and initiative of the people to attain reconciliation through the power of love and prayer.
- Brown, representing the basic race which the people take pride in the cultivation of the soil through their own sweat and blood.
- Leaning Tower, depicting the strength and sturdiness of the people to withstand the challenges of life in the passage of time. It also expresses the dignity of labor.
- Carabao and Plow, symbolizing the basic factors of production which are of paramount importance in attaining the fondest dreams of the people to become active, viable, self-reliant and productive.
- Tobacco and Garlic, representing the two major agricultural cash crops of the people, thereby attaining self-reliance.

== Education ==
There are two schools district offices which govern all public and private schools within the municipality. These are Bacarra I Schools District Office, and Bacarra II Schools District Office.

=== Primary and elementary schools ===
- Apaleng-Libtong Elementary School
- Bacarra Central Elementary School
- Bangsirit Elementary School
- Buyon Elementary School
- Cabaruan Elementary School
- Cabulalaan Elementary School
- Cadaratan Elementary School
- Calioet Elementary School
- Casilian Primary School - Taguipuro Annex
- Casilian Elementary School
- Dingras Faith Academy (Elementary)
- Ganagan Elementary School
- Macupit Elementary School
- Nambaran Elementary School
- Paninaan Elementary School
- Parang Elementary School
- Pasiocan Elementary School
- Pulangi Elementary School
- Pungto Elementary School
- Sabas-Sagisi Memorial Elem. School
- San Agustin Elementary School
- Special Education Center
- Santo Cristo Elementary School
- St. Andrew Grade School
- Tambidao Elementary School
- The Riverdeep Academy
- Tubburan Elementary School

=== Secondary schools ===
- Bacarra National Comprehensive High School
- Cadaratan National High School
- St. Andrew Academy

== Sister City ==
- Lathrop, California, United States
