= Municipalities of the Philippines =

Administrative division in Philippine provinces

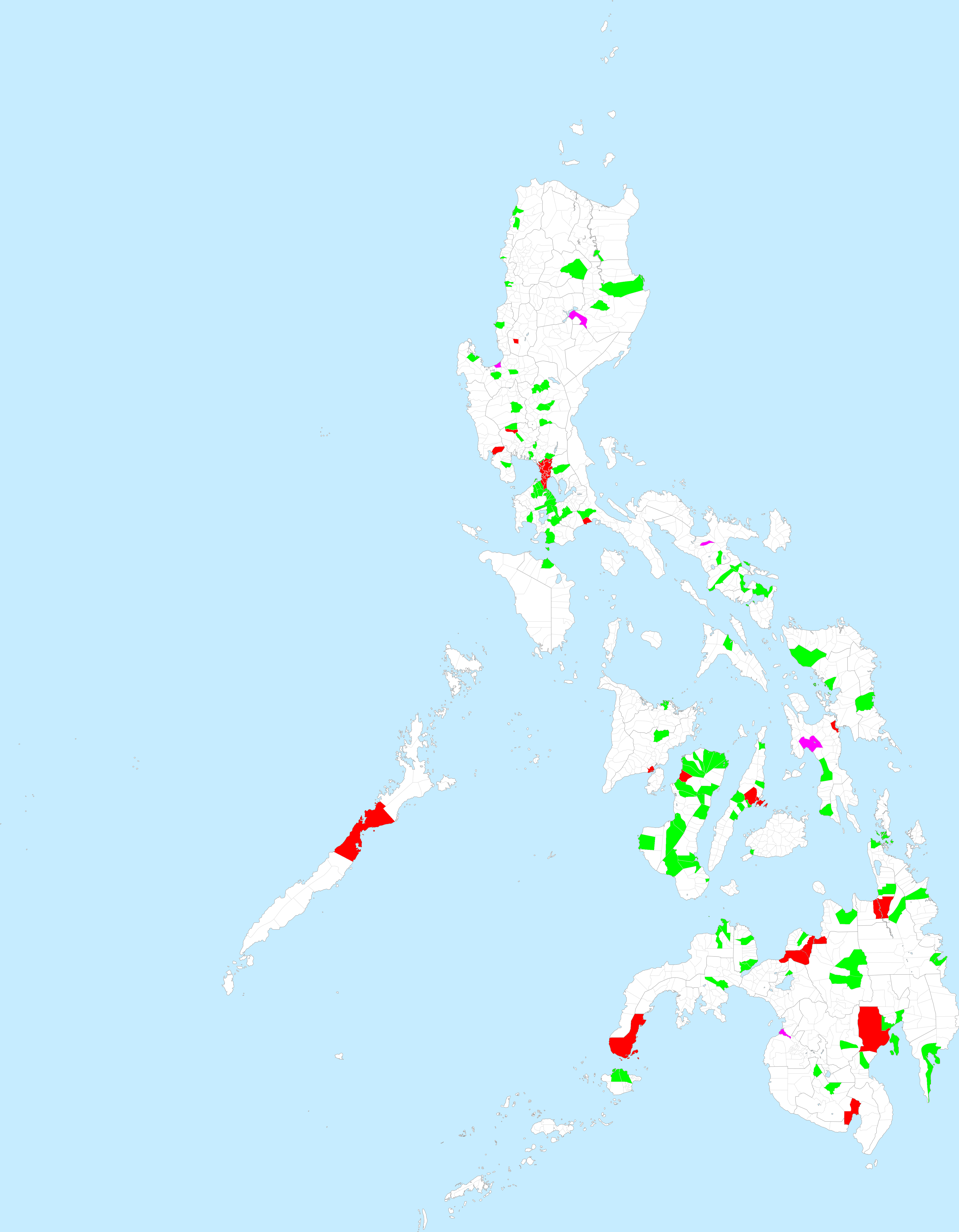
- Municipalities of the Philippines in white
- Category: Town (Local government unit)
- Location: Philippines
- Found in: Administrative and autonomous regions Provinces
- Number: 1,493 (as of June 30, 2024)
- Possible status: First–sixth class municipalities
- Populations: 406 (Kalayaan) – 451,383 (Rodriguez)
- Areas: 1.66 km^{2} (0.64 sq mi) for Pateros – 2,188.8 km^{2} (845.1 sq mi) for Sablayan
- Subdivisions: Barangays

A municipality (Note: Filipino: bayan / munisipalidad / munisipyo; Hiligaynon: banwa; Cebuano: lungsod; Pangasinan: baley; Kapampangan: balen / balayan; Central Bikol: banwaan; Waray: bungto; Ilocano: ili) is a local government unit (LGU) in the Philippines. It is distinct from a city, which is a separate category of LGU. Provinces are subdivided into cities and municipalities, which in turn are divided into barangays (formerly barrios). As of June 30, 2024, there are 1,493 municipalities across the country.

A municipality is the official term for, and the local equivalent of, a town, the latter being its archaic designation, including in literal translations into Filipino and other Philippine languages. Both terms are sometimes used interchangeably.

A municipal district is a defunct local government unit; certain areas were first created as municipal districts before later being converted into municipalities.

== History ==
The era of the formation of municipalities in the Philippines started during the Spanish rule, in which the colonial government founded hundreds of towns and villages across the archipelago modeled after towns and villages in Spain. They were then grouped together along with a centralized town center called cabecera or poblacion where the ayuntamiento, or town hall, was located; the poblacion served as the nucleus of each municipality. Only the communities that were permanently settled under the reduccion system, and have fully Christianized, are allowed to form municipalities, while others that have not yet been fully converted are to be subdued until conditions permitted for them to be incorporated as municipalities. As time passed, municipalities were created out of already existing ones, leading to them becoming smaller in area over time. Each municipality was governed by a capitan, usually a member of native principalia of the town, who have the task of remitting revenues to the central government in Manila. Ever since its inception to the present day, the term "municipality" holds the same definition as "town" when the first towns grew in size under the Spanish pueblo system (pueblo meaning "town" in Spanish language) to be granted municipal charters, hence the current official term for such type of settlements.

During the American administration, the municipal system put in place by the preceding Spanish authorities was preserved and at the same time reformed with greater inclusiveness among all Filipinos. Municipal districts, which were in essence unincorporated areas presided over by local tribal chiefs set up by American authorities, were created for the first time in 1914. More municipalities were created during this time, especially in Mindanao where there was a massive influx of settlers from the Luzon and the Visayas. After a while the independent Republic of the Philippines was declared in 1946, all municipal districts were dissolved and were absorbed into or broken into municipalities. The latest guidelines in the creation of new municipalities were introduced in 1991 with the issuance of the Local Government Code.

=== Townships and municipal districts ===
During the American era, in provinces where there were non-Christians, such areas being insufficiently fit to become municipalities were designated either municipal districts or townships.

Townships were adapted also to tribal people. By 1903, only the provinces of Benguet and Lepanto-Bontoc were divided by such. Townships were later established in Mountain Province (where Lepanto-Bontoc was then included), Nueva Vizcaya, Batanes, Mindoro and Palawan. By 1919, townships, alongside rancherías, were abolished and reorganized or annexed into municipal units.

Municipal districts were "[too] small or remote" settlements where their establishment as barrios of municipalities seemed impossible. First established in Department of Mindanao and Sulu, these local units were later formed elsewhere in the country; and however gradually decreased, either being abolished and annexed to another entity, or being converted into a municipality. The officials were appointed until mid-1950s when they were eventually elected. The Local Government Code of 1983 (now repealed) required all remaining municipal districts be converted into municipalities, effectively abolishing such units. The last documented case of such conversion was that of Adams, Carasi and Dumalneg, all in Ilocos Norte, in May 1983.

== Responsibilities and powers ==
Municipalities have some autonomy from the National Government of the Republic of the Philippines under the Local Government Code of 1991. They have been granted corporate personality enabling them to enact local policies and laws, enforce them, and govern their jurisdictions. They can enter into contracts and other transactions through their elected and appointed officials and can tax. They are tasked with enforcing all laws, whether local or national. The National Government assists and supervises the local government to make sure that they do not violate national law. Local Governments have their own executive and legislative branches and the checks and balances between these two major branches, along with their separation, are more pronounced than that of the national government. The Judicial Branch of the Republic of the Philippines also caters to the needs of local government units. Local governments, such as a municipalities, do not have their own judicial branch: their judiciary is the same as that of the national government.

== Organization ==
According to Chapter II, Title II, Book III of Republic Act 7160 or the Local Government Code of 1991, a municipality shall mainly have a mayor (alkalde), a vice mayor (ikalawang alkalde / bise alkalde) and members (kagawad) of the legislative branch Sangguniang Bayan alongside a secretary to the said legislature.

The following positions are also required for all municipalities across the Philippines:

- Treasurer
- Assessor
- Accountant
- Budget Officer
- Planning and Development Coordinator
- Engineer / Building Official
- Health Officer
- Civil Registrar
- Municipal Disaster Risks Reduction and Management Officer

Depending on the need to do so, the municipal mayor may also appoint the following municipal positions:

- Administrator
- Legal Officer
- Agriculturist
- Architect
- Information Officer
- Tourism Officer
- Municipal Environment and Natural Resources Officer
- Municipal Social Welfare and Development Officer

=== Duties and functions ===
As mentioned in Title II, Book III of Republic Act 7160, the municipal mayor is the chief executive officer of the municipal government and shall determine guidelines on local policies and direct formulation of development plans. These responsibilities shall be under approval of the Sangguniang Bayan.

The vice mayor (bise-alkalde) shall sign all warrants drawn on the municipal treasury. Being presiding officer of the Sangguniang Bayan (English: Municipal Council), he can as well appoint members of the municipal legislature except its twelve regular members or kagawad who are also elected every local election alongside the municipal mayor and vice mayor. In circumstances where the mayor permanently or temporarily vacates the position, he shall assume executive duties and functions.

While the vice mayor presides over the legislature, she or he cannot vote unless the necessity of tie-breaking arises. Laws or ordinances proposed by the Sangguniang Bayan, however, may be approved or vetoed by the mayor. If approved, they become local ordinances. If the mayor neither vetoes nor approves the proposal of the Sangguniang Bayan for ten days from the time of receipt, the proposal becomes law as if it had been signed. If vetoed, the draft is sent back to the Sangguniang Bayan. The latter may override the mayor by a vote of at least two-thirds (2 / 3) of all its members, in which case, the proposal becomes law.

A municipality, upon reaching certain requirements (such as minimum population size, and minimum annual revenue) may opt to become a city. First, a bill must be passed in Congress, then signed into law by the President and then the residents would vote in the resulting plebiscite to accept or reject cityhood. One benefit in being a city is that the city government gets more budget (e.g. "National Tax Allotment" (NTA) formerly "Internal Revenue Allotment" (IRA) ), but taxes are much higher than in municipalities.

== Income classification ==
Republic Act (RA) No. 11964, otherwise known as the "Automatic Income Classification of Local Government Units Act", was signed by president Bongbong Marcos on October 26, 2023. The law classifies municipalities into five classes, according to their income ranges, based on the average annual regular income for three fiscal years preceding a general income reclassification. The classifications are as follows:

Cl	Average annual income ₱
First	> 200,000,000.00
Second	160,000,000.00 – 200,000,000.00
Third	130,000,000.00 – 160,000,000.00
Fourth	90,000,000.00 – 130,000,000.00
Fifth	< 90,000,000.00

== See also ==
- Sangguniang Bayan
- List of cities and municipalities in the Philippines
- List of renamed cities and municipalities in the Philippines
- Media related to Municipalities in the Philippines at Wikimedia Commons

== Sources ==
- Republic Act No. 7160 (Oct 10, 1991), "Local Government Code of 1991", lawphil.net (8th Congress of the Republic of the Philippines), archived from the original on May 3, 2016
- "Income Classification for Provinces, Cities and Municipalities". NSCB. Nov 20, 2001. Archived from the original on Aug 30, 2003.
- "DEPARTMENT OF FINANCE ORDER No.23–08" (PDF). NSCB. Jul 29, 2008. Archived from the original (PDF) on Nov 13, 2010.
- "Philippine Standard Geographic Code – List of Municipalities". PSA. Mar 31, 2016. Archived from the original on Jul 6, 2016.
