= Sandro Marcos =

Filipino politician (born 1994)

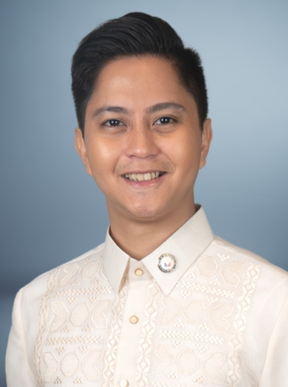
- Official portrait, 2025

House Majority Leader
- Incumbent
- Assumed office July 28, 2025
- Preceded by: Mannix Dalipe

Senior House Deputy Majority Leader
- In office July 26, 2022 – June 30, 2025
- Leader: Mannix Dalipe
- Preceded by: Jesus Crispin Remulla
- Succeeded by: Lorenz Defensor

Member of the House of Representatives from Ilocos Norte's 1st district
- Incumbent
- Assumed office June 30, 2022
- Preceded by: Ria Christina Fariñas

Personal details
- Born: Ferdinand Alexander Araneta Marcos III; March 7, 1994 (age 32) San Juan, Metro Manila, Philippines
- Party: Lakas (since 2026)
- Other political affiliations: PFP (2023–2026); Nacionalista (2021–2023)
- Relations: Marcos family Araneta family Romualdez family
- Parent(s): Bongbong Marcos; Liza Araneta Marcos
- Education: University of London (BS, MS)
- Occupation: Politician

Ferdinand Alexander "Sandro" Araneta Marcos III (UK: /ˈmɑːrkɒs/ MAR-koss, US: /-koʊs, -kɔːs/ -kohss, -kawss, Tagalog: [ˈmaɾkɔs]; born March 7, 1994) is Filipino politician who has served as the House majority leader since 2025. A member of the Lakas–CMD, he has concurrently served as the representative of Ilocos Norte's first district, an office he has held since 2022. He is the eldest son of President Bongbong Marcos and First Lady Liza Araneta Marcos.

== Early life and education ==
Ferdinand Alexander Araneta Marcos III, nicknamed "Sandro", was born on March 7, 1994 at Cardinal Santos Medical Center in San Juan, Metro Manila, to Bongbong Marcos, who was then serving as the representative for Ilocos Norte's second district, and attorney Liza Araneta Marcos. He is the eldest of the three sons. He is the grandson of the late president, Ferdinand Marcos and his wife Imelda Marcos.

Marcos attended Kids Kollege, Inc. and Padre Annibale School in Laoag for his primary education. He then left for the United Kingdom and attended the Worth School for his secondary education from 2006 to 2013. After that, he went to the City, University of London, where he earned a degree in Bachelor of Science in International Relations with honors in 2016. He then earned his master's degree in Developmental Studies at the London School of Economics and Political Science in 2017.

== Career ==
Before running for public office, Marcos worked as a member of the legislative staff of House majority leader and representative Martin Romualdez, his father's cousin, whom he sees as his mentor.

In 2021, before joining the legislative staff of House Majority Leaders, he worked as a consultant for his cousin, Ilocos Norte Governor Matthew Manotoc. His responsibilities included overseeing the efficient distribution of assistance to the people of Ilocos Norte, such as food packs, fishing gear for fishermen, tablets for remote learning, and a COVID recovery assistance program for sari-sari store owners.

== House of Representatives (since 2022) ==
=== Elections ===
Marcos ran for representative of Ilocos Norte's first district in the 2022 election and won, defeating incumbent Ria Christina Fariñas. He was reelected unopposed in the 2025 election.

=== First term (2022–2025) ===
Despite being a neophyte congressman, he was elected House senior deputy majority leader in the 19th Congress on July 26, 2022.

In late November 2022, Marcos, together with his uncle, House Speaker Martin Romualdez, filed House Bill No. 6398, also known as the Maharlika Investment Fund, which aimed to create a sovereign wealth fund for the Philippines. The legislation drew inspiration from South Korea's own sovereign wealth fund. The MIF was approved by the House of Representatives on December 12, 2022. Economist Michael Batu said the bill can help raise money to help the government's programs and achieve development goals, if managed properly.

In August 2023, during House hearings for the 2024 proposed ₱2.4 billion budget for the Office of the Vice President, Sandro Marcos moved to end the sessions to prevent opposition lawmakers from posing questions to Vice President Sara Duterte. Kabataan party-list Representative Raoul Manuel and ACT Teachers party-list Representative France Castro opposed Marcos's motion but were outvoted by other representatives.

In February 2025, Marcos was the first to sign the fourth impeachment complaint against Vice President Sara Duterte at the House of Representatives, which ultimately gathered 240 signatures in Congress.

==== "Allocable" funds ====
From 2023 to 2025, Marcos got the highest amount of "allocable" funds under the budget approved by Congress at ₱15.8 billion, with Romualdez getting the second highest amount at ₱14.4 billion from the national budget. Amid the flood control projects controversy in the Philippines, the People’s Budget Coalition criticized "allocable" funds as a new form of pork barrel, saying it goes to "politically determined projects that crowd out more equitable and accountable public spending". A Philippine Center for Investigative Journalism report that investigated the budget described Romualdez and Marcos as the "pork barrel kings".

==== Ferdinand Marcos monuments ====
Under the presidency of Bongbong Marcos, memorials, monuments, and institutions have been built or planned to honor Ferdinand Marcos and his dictatorship. Some of the memorials, including those that use public funds, are meant to support false narratives such as Ferdinand Marcos's dubious war record. In 2023, the Ferdinand E. Marcos Grandstand was constructed in Laoag, Ilocos Norte, using public funds controlled by the office of Representative Sandro Marcos.

=== Second term and House Majority Leader (since 2025) ===
Leading up to the convention of the 20th Congress, his colleagues were in talks to elect him House majority leader, a move that would received from the Lakas–CMD, the dominant majority party at the time. On July 28, 2025, Marcos was elected unopposed to the role, becoming among its youngest holders.

In November 2025, former House of Representatives appropriations chair Zaldy Co alleged that Sandro Marcos made insertions worth ₱9.636 billion in the 2023 national budget, ₱20.174 billion in the 2024 budget, and ₱21.127 billion in the 2025 budget. Co alleged that Sandro Marcos threatened to remove him from his post when Co could not accommodate Sandro Marco's alleged request for an ₱8-billion insertion in the budget. Co also linked Sandro Marcos's father, President Bongbong Marcos, and uncle, former House Speaker Martin Romualdez to alleged corruption related to the flood control scandal.

House Deputy Minority Leader Antonio Tinio (ACT party-list), House Assistant Minority Leader Renee Co (Kabataan party-list), and Gabriela party-list Representative Sarah Elago filed House Resolution 515 calling for a legislative probe on Marcos, former Executive Secretary Lucas Bersamin, and other officials with alleged links to the flood control corruption controversy. The Ombdusman said that it will investigate Sandro Marcos and Romualdez in relation to pork barrel funds they got from the national budget.

After impeachment complaints were filed against President Marcos in January 2026, Sandro said he would inhibit from related proceedings in the House of Representatives.

In October 2026, Marcos left Partido Federal ng Pilipinas, his father's party, to join Lakas–CMD.

== Personal life ==
Marcos is a polo enthusiast. In September 2025, it was revealed that he had been in a five-year relationship with actress Alexa Miro, which had been kept private due to him being part of the First Family.

== Electoral history ==
Electoral history of Sandro Marcos
Year	Office	Party	Votes received				Result
Year	Office	Party	Total	%	P.	Swing	Result
2022	Representative (Ilocos Norte–1st)	Nacionalista	108,423	56.63%	1st	—N/a	Won
2025	Representative (Ilocos Norte–1st)	PFP	169,880	100.00%	1st	+43.37	Unopposed
