= Simeon Valdez =

Filipino lawyer and politician (1915–2010)

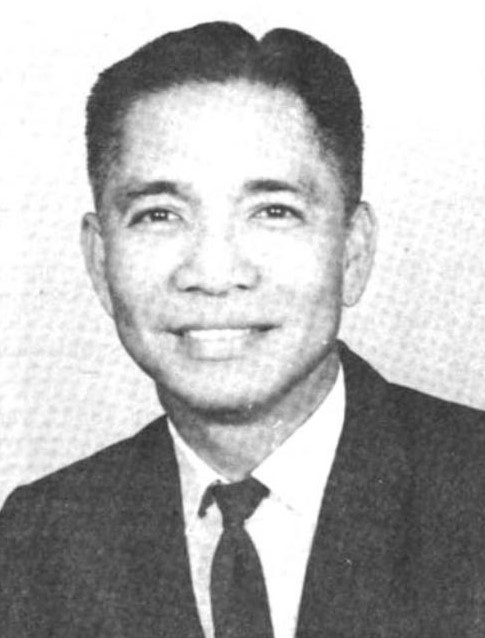
- Valdez's official portrait during the 6th Congress

Member of the Philippine House of Representatives from Ilocos Norte's 2nd district
- In office June 30, 1995 – June 30, 1998
- Preceded by: Bongbong Marcos
- Succeeded by: Imee Marcos
- In office December 30, 1961 – January 17, 1973
- Preceded by: Ferdinand Marcos
- Succeeded by: District abolished (seat later held by Mariano Nalupta Jr. in 1987)

Personal details
- Born: February 18, 1915 Batac, Ilocos Norte, Philippine Islands
- Died: June 8, 2010 (aged 95)
- Party: Lakas (1994–2010)
- Other political affiliations: Nacionalista (1961–1973)
- Spouse: Lydia David Dumlao (died 2004)
- Children: 8
- Relatives: Fidel V. Ramos (nephew); Leticia Ramos-Shahani (niece)
- Education: University of the Philippines (BS); Philippine Law School (LLB)

Simeon Marcos Valdez (February 18, 1915 – June 8, 2010) was a Filipino lawyer, army officer, war veteran, and politician who served as the representative for Ilocos Norte's 2nd congressional district in the Philippine House of Representatives from 1961 to 1973 and from 1995 to 1998.

He was related to former Philippine president Ferdinand Marcos. through his mother, Crispina Marcos-Valdez, who was the sister of Marcos's paternal grandfather, Fabian Marcos.

== Early life and education ==
Simeon Marcos Valdez was born on February 18, 1915, in Batac, Ilocos Norte, to Hilario Valdez and Crispina Marcos. He attended Batac Elementary School and Ilocos Norte Provincial High School for his primary and secondary education, respectively. He later graduated from the University of the Philippines (UP) in 1936 with a Bachelor of Science degree in business administration. He subsequently studied law at the Philippine Law School, graduating in 1951.

Valdez also completed an advanced Reserve Officers' Training Corps (ROTC) course at UP, an advanced supply course with the United States Army in Port Area, Manila, in 1938, and a course at the U.S. Army Quartermaster School in Virginia in 1947. He also undertook in-service executive training at the UP Institute of Public Administration and completed an Armed Forces of the Philippines (AFP) management course from 1957 to 1958.

== Early career ==
Valdez began his career as an assistant professor at the UP Department of Military Science and Tactics in 1936. He later became a district finance officer in the 10th Military District, covering Mindanao and Sulu, before being promoted to chief of the Finance Service of the Disbursement Division of the United States Army Forces in the Far East (USAFFE).

From November 1941 to April 10, 1942, Valdez was held as a prisoner of war. Following his release, he served as deputy quartermaster general of the AFP, commanding officer of the 1st Quartermaster Truck Battalion of the Philippine Army, assistant chief of staff for G-4 of the IV Military Area, and eventually comptroller general. He retired from military service in 1956.

That same year, Valdez was appointed manager of the marketing group of Central Cooperative Exchange, Inc. He later became manager of its personnel, administration and services department and assistant general manager, serving in the latter positions from 1957 to 1958.

=== Ang Maharlika guerilla force ===
In a 1944 field report, Valdez's nephew, Ferdinand Marcos, referred to him as "Simmy" and stated that Valdez had served as head of the Zambales and Manila regiments and the provincial intelligence units of Ang Maharlika, a purported 9,000-member guerrilla force that Marcos claimed to have led after the fall of Bataan.

== House of Representatives ==
Valdez first ran for the House of Representatives in 1961 under the Nacionalista Party, representing Ilocos Norte's 2nd congressional district, following Marcos's election to the Senate. During the 5th Congress, he principally authored Republic Act No. 3518, which established the Philippine Veterans Bank. He also served as chairman of the House Committee on National Defense and as a member of seven other committees. He was also named by the Philippines Free Press as one of the country's 15 outstanding congressmen in 1963.

Valdez was re-elected in 1965 and served during the 6th Congress as a member of six House committees. He won a third consecutive term in 1969, but his congressional service was cut short in 1973 following Marcos's declaration of martial law and the ratification of the 1973 Constitution, which abolished Congress.

In 1995, Valdez ran unopposed under Lakas–NUCD–UMDP for another term, while incumbent representative and Marcos's son, Bongbong, ran for a Senate seat. In 1996, he called on President Fidel V. Ramos to allow the burial of former president Marcos at the Libingan ng mga Bayani, which ultimately took place in 2016.

He lost his re-election bid to Imee Marcos in 1998, before retiring from public office.

== Personal life ==
Valdez was married to Lydia David Dumlao (1920–2004), with whom he had seven children and an adopted son. He served as a board director, president, and life member of the USAFIP-NL Veterans Association, and was a member of the Supreme Council of the Veterans Federation of the Philippines. He was also affiliated with Pan Xenia, an international trade fraternity; Upsilon Sigma Phi; the Manila Overseas Press Club; the Defenders of Bataan and Corregidor; the Philippine Bar; the U.P. Vanguard Fraternity; and the Lions Club International.

Valdez died on June 8, 2010.

== Honors and recognition ==
- Mariano Marcos State University, Doctor of Philosophy in Rural Development (1994)

== Electoral history ==
Electoral history of Simeon Valdez
Year	Office	Party	Votes received				Result
Year	Office	Party	Total	%	P.	Swing	Result
1961	Representative (Ilocos Norte–2nd)	Nacionalista	—N/a	—N/a	1st	—N/a	Won
1965	Representative (Ilocos Norte–2nd)	Nacionalista (Independent)	23,300	51.53%	1st	—N/a	Won
1969	Representative (Ilocos Norte–2nd)	Nacionalista	—N/a	—N/a	1st	—N/a	Won
1995	Representative (Ilocos Norte–2nd)	Lakas	64,905	100.00%	1st	—N/a	Unopposed
1998	Representative (Ilocos Norte–2nd)	Lakas	21,065	20.51%	2nd	-79.49	Lost

== See also ==
- Marcos family

House of Representatives of the Philippines
Preceded by Bongbong Marcos	Member of the Philippine House of Representatives for Ilocos Norte's 2nd district 1995–1998	Succeeded by Imee Marcos
Preceded by Ferdinand Marcos	Member of the Philippine House of Representatives for Ilocos Norte's 2nd district 1961–1973	Vacant Martial law and adoption of the 1973 Constitution Title next held by Mariano Nalupta Jr.
