= Mariano Nalupta Jr. =

Filipino lawyer and politician

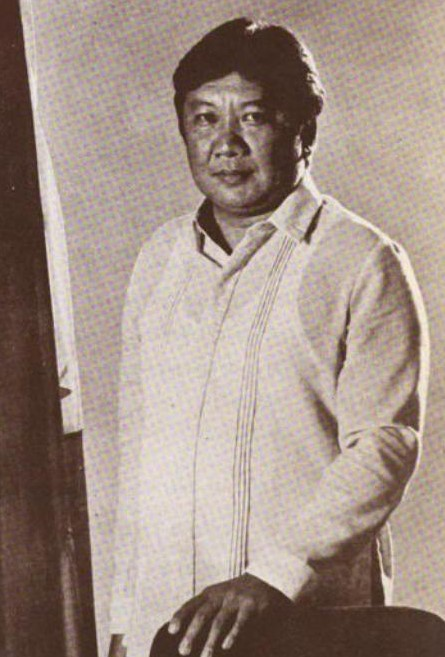
- Nalupta in 1988

Vice Governor of Ilocos Norte
- In office June 30, 1992 – June 30, 2001
- Governor: Rodolfo Fariñas (1992–1998); Bongbong Marcos (1998–2001)
- Preceded by: Rolando Abadilla
- Succeeded by: Windell D. Chua

Member of the Philippine House of Representatives from Ilocos Norte's 2nd district
- In office June 30, 1987 – June 30, 1992
- Preceded by: Simeon Valdez
- Succeeded by: Bongbong Marcos

Member of the Ilocos Norte Provincial Board from the 2nd District
- In office 1980–1986

Member of the Batac Municipal Council
- In office 1976–1980

Personal details
- Born: Mariano Rosario Nalupta Jr. April 26, 1945 Batac, Ilocos Norte, Philippine Commonwealth
- Died: September 2, 2014 (aged 69) Quezon City, Philippines
- Cause of death: Heart Attack
- Resting place: Aglipay Cemetery, Batac, Ilocos Norte
- Spouse: Ma. Elena Marders - Nalupta
- Children: Ronald Allan M. Nalupta; Myra Shiela M. Nalupta - Barba; Richard Alvin M. Nalupta; Mariano Francisco M. Nalupta III
- Occupation: Politician, Lawyer

Mariano "Anno" Rosario Nalupta Jr. (April 26, 1945 - September 2, 2014), was a Filipino lawyer and politician. He was Congressman of the 2nd District of Ilocos Norte from 1987 to 1992. He later served as Vice Governor of Ilocos Norte from 1992 to 2001.

He died on September 2, 2014, at the Philippine Heart Center after suffering a heart attack.

== Early life ==
Nalupta was born on April 26, 1945, at Batac, Ilocos Norte to Mariano Nalupta Sr., his namesake and who was then the Mayor of Batac, and Trinidad Rosario. His brother Jesus served as Mayor of Batac from 1988 to 1998 and 2001 to 2007.

== Political career ==
He served as Councilor of Batac from 1976 to 1980. He later served as a Board Member of the 2nd District of Ilocos Norte from 1980 to 1986. In 1987, he was elected as Congressman of the 2nd District of Ilocos Norte and served until 1992. He was later elected as Vice Governor of Ilocos Norte in 1992 and served until 2001.

After his term as Vice Governor, he was elected as the President of the Integrated Bar of the Philippines - Ilocos Norte Chapter.

In 2004, he ran again for Vice Governor of Ilocos Norte but was unsuccessful.

He ran again as representative of the 2nd District of Ilocos Norte in 2010 but lost to Former First Lady Imelda R. Marcos.

== Personal life ==
He was married to Ma. Elena Marders-Nalupta, a former Mayor and Vice-Mayor of Batac and Provincial Board Member of the 2nd District of Ilocos Norte. They had four children namely;

- Ronald Allan M. Nalupta, former Vice Mayor and Councilor of Batac.
- Atty. Myra Shiela M. Nalupta-Barba, presiding RTC Branch 65 Judge of Laoag. Married to Ilocos Norte 2nd District Representative Angelo Marcos Barba.
- Atty. Richard Alvin "Richie" M. Nalupta, former National Youth Commission President under the Arroyo Administration and SK Federated President of Ilocos Norte.
- Mariano Francisco "Thirdee" M. Nalupta III, former Barangay Chairman of Brgy. 2 Ablan, Batac.

== Death ==
Nalupta died on September 2, 2014, around 6am, at the Philippine Heart Center in Quezon City. His remains were brought to Ilocos Norte. His official wake was held in their family residence at Brgy. 4 Nalupta, Batac. On the last day of his wake, September 12, 2014, his remains were brought to the Batac City Hall.

His funeral was held on September 13, 2014, with a funeral mass held at the Immaculate Conception Parish. After the mass, he was finally buried at the Nalupta Family Mausoleum, Aglipay Cemetery, in Batac.

=== Funeral accident ===
After the funeral mass held for Nalupta Jr. at the Immaculate Conception Parish on September 13, 2014, the funeral cortege was on the way to the final resting place of the late public servant when a SUV (Mitsubishi Montero), owned by one of the children of the deceased, suddenly went out of control in front of the church, hitting 13 people, including Provincial Board Member Ria Christina Fariñas, daughter of Congressman Rodolfo Fariñas, former Vigan City Councilor Janina Medina-Fariñas, and Batac ABC President Johann Nalupta, nephew of the deceased. Two victims died in the said accident; Teresa Domingo, 72 and Elston Franco, 70.

== See also ==
- Jesus Nalupta Sr., brother

House of Representatives of the Philippines
| Preceded by Simeon Valdez | Representative, 2nd District of Ilocos Norte; 1987–1992 | Succeeded by Bongbong Marcos |
Political offices
| Preceded by Rolando Abadilla | Vice Governor of Ilocos Norte; 1992–2001 | Succeeded by Windell Chua |
