= Dingras Church =

Roman Catholic church in Ilocos Norte, Philippines

- Saint Joseph Parish Church
- Iglesia Parroquial de San José (Spanish)
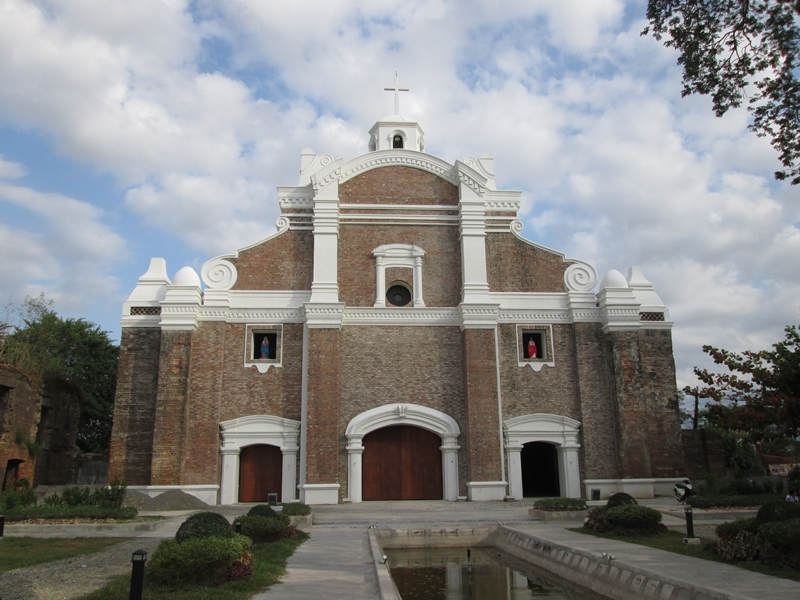
- Church facade in 2015

- Location in Luzon Location in the Philippines
- 18°06′11″N 120°41′55″E
- Location: Poblacion, Brgy. Madamba, Dingras, Ilocos Norte
- Country: Philippines
- Denomination: Roman Catholic

History
- Status: Parish church
- Dedication: Saint Joseph

Architecture
- Functional status: Active
- Architectural type: Church building
- Style: Baroque architecture

Specifications
- Length: 90 feet (27 m)
- Width: 20 feet (6.1 m)

Administration
- Province: Nueva Segovia
- Metropolis: Nueva Segovia
- Archdiocese: Nueva Segovia
- Diocese: Laoag

Clergy
- Archbishop: David William Antonio
- Bishop: Renato P. Mayugba

Saint Joseph Parish Church, commonly known as Dingras Church, is a Roman Catholic church located in the municipality of Dingras, Ilocos Norte, Philippines under the jurisdiction of the Diocese of Laoag.

== History ==
Dingras started as a visita of Batac and became an independent parish by the Augustinians. Father Bartolome Conrado became the first parish priest in 1598. It was reinstated as a visita in 1603 and back as a parish in 1605. The church was destroyed by earthquake in 1619, reconstructed before a fire in 1838, and lightning in 1853. Another church, largely known as the ruins of the Catholic Church of Dingras, was built by Augustinian friar Damaso Vieytez. It was restored and remodeled by Father Ricardo Deza with the help of Mayor Camilo Millan from 1879 to 1893. It was ruined by fire and earthquake in 1913.

== Architecture ==
The church measuring 90 feet (27 m) in diameter and 20 feet (6.1 m) in width is one of the largest church in the Philippines.

== Gallery ==
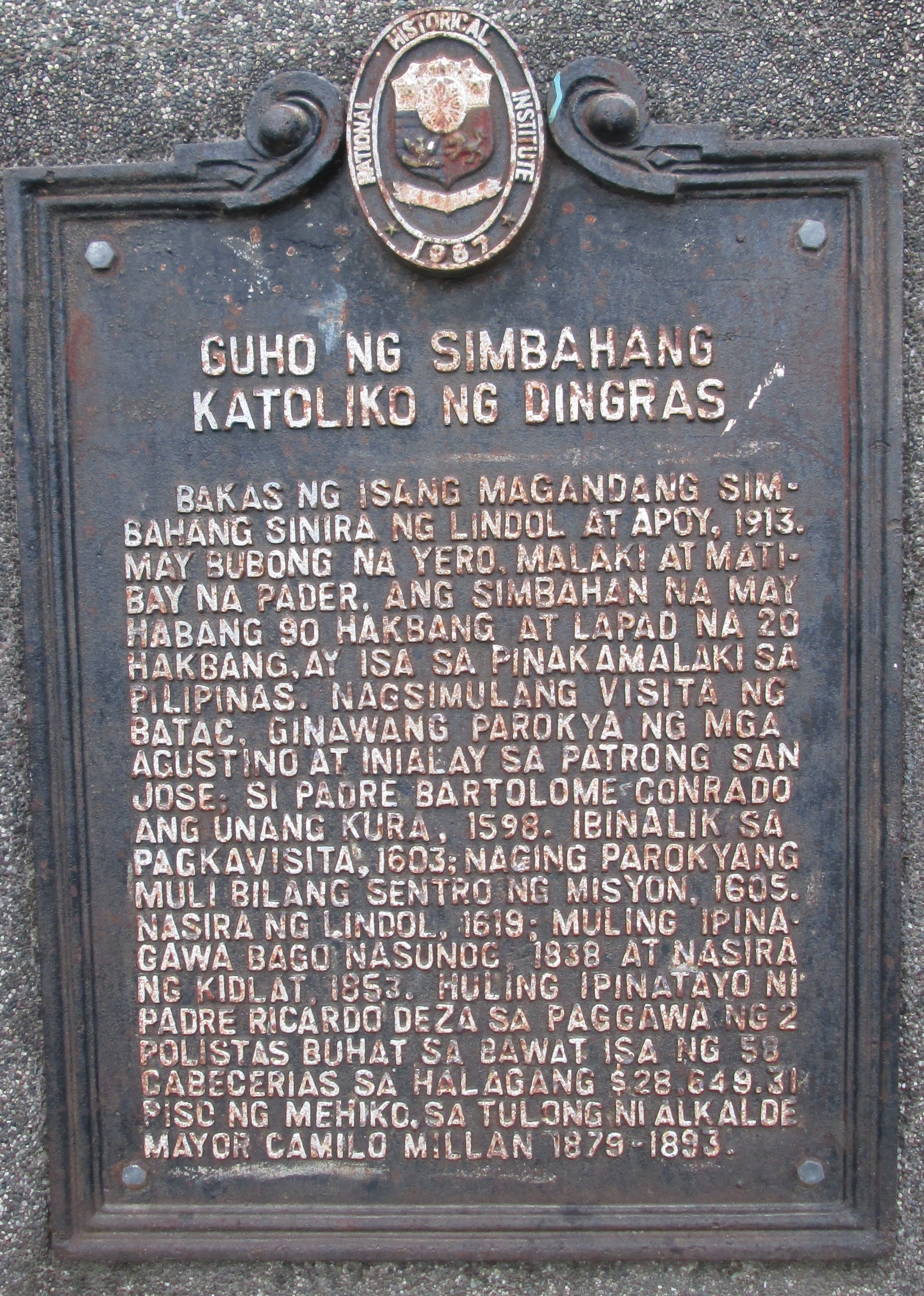
Church NHI historical marker in 1987

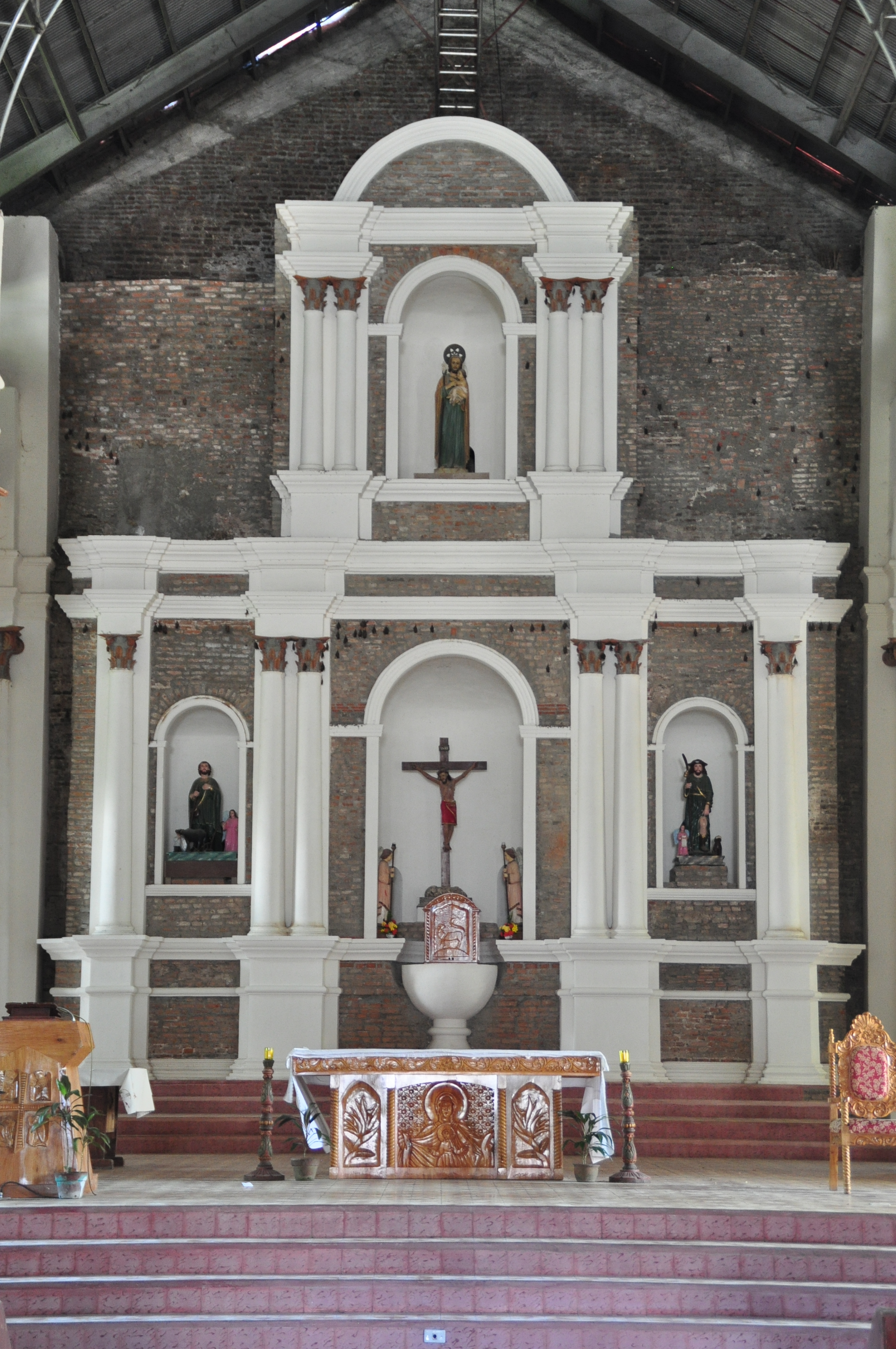
Church retablo mayor in 2014

== Bibliography ==
- Dela Torre, Visitacion (2006). The Ilocos Heritage. Makati: Tower Book House. ISBN 978-971-91030-9-7.
- Historical Markers: Regions I-IV and CAR (in Filipino). Manila: National Historical Institute (Philippines). 1993. p. 88. ISBN 9715380611.
