= Mariano Marcos State University =

Public university in Ilocos Norte, Philippines

- Pamantasang Pampamahalaan Mariano Marcos (Filipino)
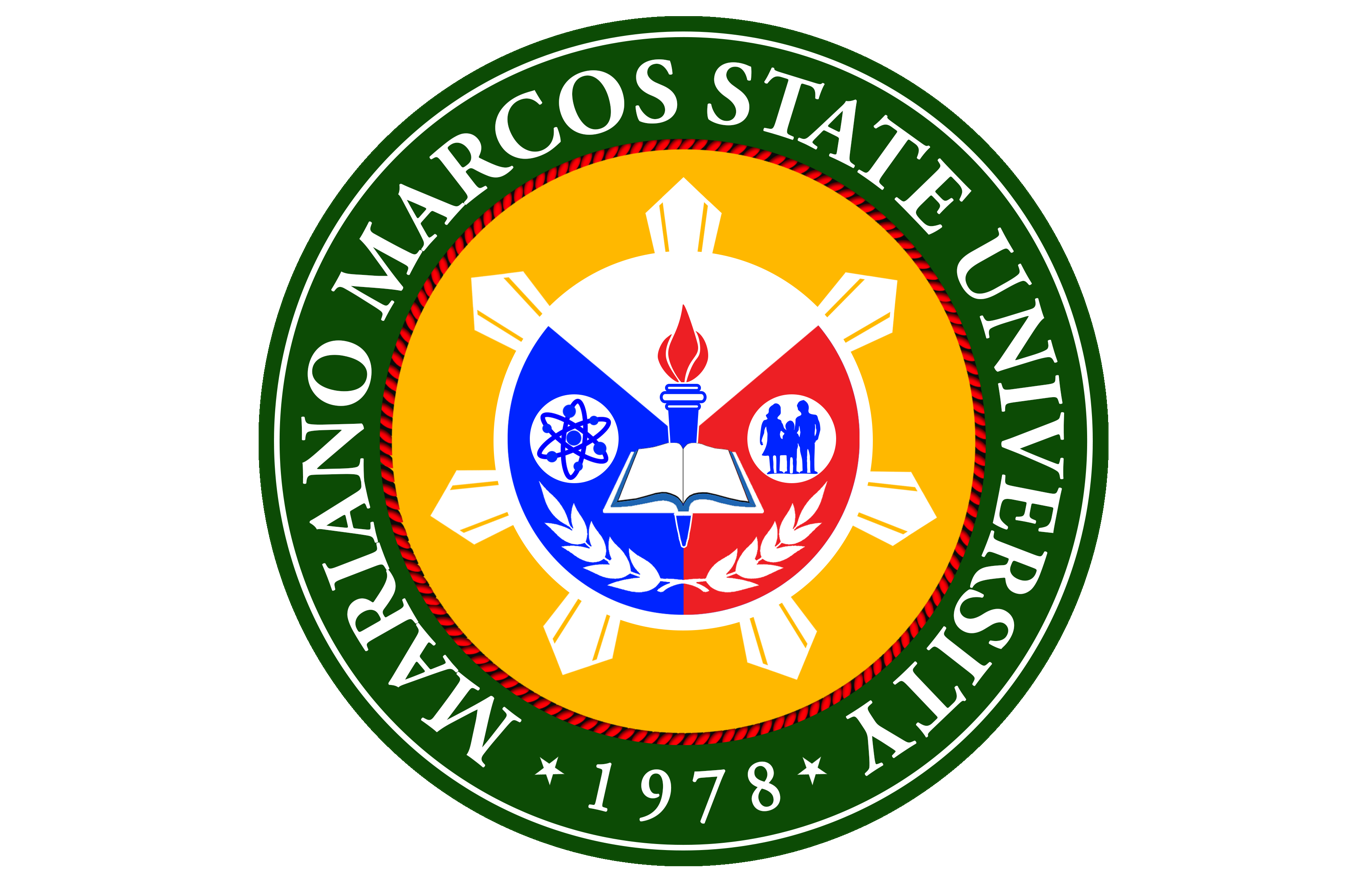
- Motto: "Cultivating Minds, Transforming Futures."
- Type: Regional State University
- Established: January 6, 1978; 48 years ago
- Academic affiliations: PASUC
- President: Dr. Virgilio Julius P. Manzano, Jr.
- Students: +16,000
- Location: Ilocos Norte, Philippines; 18°03′39″N 120°32′56″E
- Campus: Main Batac 300 ha (3,000,000 m^{2}) Satellite * Laoag * Paoay * Currimao * Dingras
- Student publication: Sirmata — official student newspaper, the oldest continuously running student publication in Region I
- Colors: Green Gold
- Nickname: MMSU Stallions
- Sporting affiliations: SCUAA I, NCC Philippines
- Mascot: Stallion
- Website: www.mmsu.edu.ph
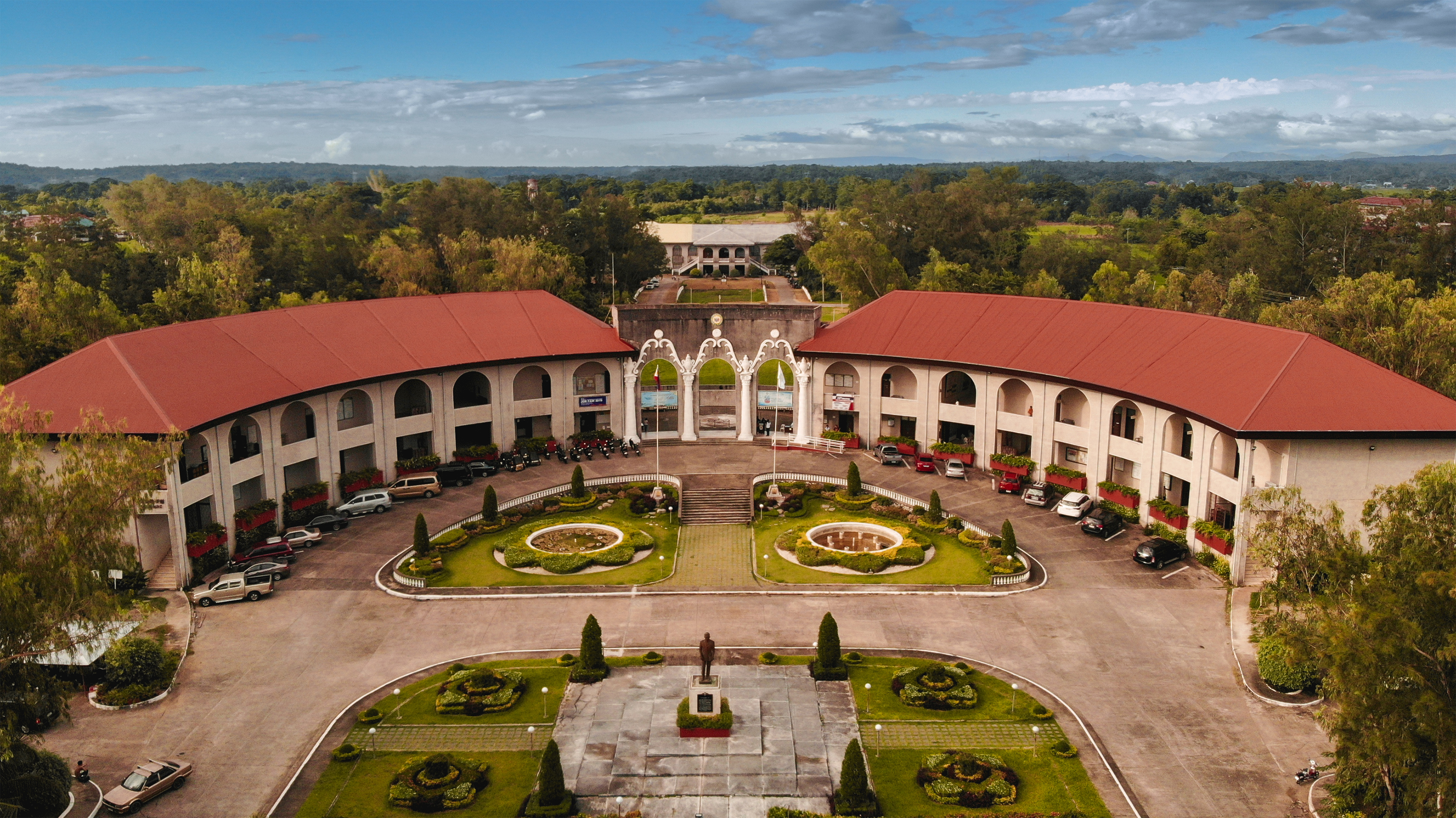
- Location in Ilocos Norte

Mariano Marcos State University (MMSU; Tagalog: Pamantasang Pampamahalaan Mariano Marcos) is a higher education institution with campuses and facilities throughout Ilocos Norte province in the Philippines. Its main campus is in Batac.

== History ==
=== Establishment ===
Mariano Marcos State University was established through Presidential Decree No. 1279, issued by President Ferdinand Marcos on January 6, 1978, which merged two existing state colleges in Ilocos Norte: the Mariano Marcos Memorial College of Science and Technology (MMMCST) in Batac and the Northern Luzon State College (NLSC) in Laoag City. The decree also integrated the tertiary-level courses of the Ilocos Norte Agricultural College in Pasuquin and the Ilocos Norte College of Arts and Trades in Laoag.

=== Predecessor institutions ===
MMMCST traced its origins to the Batac Farm School, founded in 1906. The school became the Batac Rural High School in 1918, the Ilocos Norte Institute of Technology in 1964, and MMMCST in 1974. Its satellite campuses were the Currimao School of Fisheries, the Dingras National Agricultural School, and the Ilocos Norte School for Craftsmen in Paoay.

NLSC began in 1917 as an experimental vacation school of the Philippine Normal School. As enrollment grew and its course offerings expanded, it was renamed the Ilocos Norte Normal School in 1952, the Northern Luzon Teachers College in 1963, and NLSC in 1976.

=== Development ===
Following its establishment in 1978, MMSU expanded its academic programs, research activities, extension services, and physical facilities across Ilocos Norte, and has since developed programs in agriculture, engineering, education, computing, health sciences, medicine, law, aquatic sciences, and other fields.

=== Renaming proposals ===
Beginning in 2019, several bills were filed in the House of Representatives seeking to rename the university "Ferdinand E. Marcos State University" in honor of the university's namesake's son, former president Ferdinand Marcos. The proposal was refiled in the 19th Congress as House Bill No. 2407, authored by Ilocos Norte 2nd District Rep. Angelo Marcos Barba. In August 2022, the House committee on higher and technical education approved the bill in a 7–1 vote, despite objections from Kabataan party-list Rep. Raoul Manuel. As of 2026, the bill has not been enacted into law.

== Student publications ==
Sirmata is the official publication of the college students of Mariano Marcos State University. A literary journal called Anthology was first produced in 1998, separate from the regular tabloid issues of Sirmata.

== Location ==
MMSU is in Ilocos Norte, a province in the northwestern part of Luzon Island, Philippines. Its main campus of about 300 hectares is in Batac, 472 km (293 mi) from Manila.

MMSU maintains five other campuses. These are in Batac (main campus), Laoag City (two campuses), Currimao, Dingras, and Paoay. In Laoag is the College of Education or the College of Teacher Education and the College of Industrial Technology.

== Academics ==
As of 2026, the university offers 49 undergraduate degree programs and 21 graduate and advanced-study programs across fourteen colleges.

=== Colleges ===
- College of Agriculture, Food and Sustainable Development
- College of Aquatic Sciences and Applied Technology
- College of Arts and Sciences
- College of Business, Economics and Accountancy
- College of Computing and Information Sciences
- College of Dentistry
- College of Engineering
- College of Health Sciences
- College of Industrial Technology
- College of Law
- College of Medicine
- College of Teacher Education
- College of Veterinary Medicine
- Graduate School

The university's academic structure has changed over time as new colleges, programs, and professional fields were established.

=== Undergraduate education ===
The university offers bachelor's degree programs in agriculture, business, computing, engineering, education, health sciences, industrial technology, natural sciences, social sciences, and other disciplines.

=== Graduate and professional education ===
The university offers graduate and advanced studies as well as professional programs in fields including law and medicine.

MMSU's College of Medicine is one of the state universities and colleges nationwide participating in a government-funded Doctor of Medicine scholarship program.

=== Rankings ===
MMSU holds a four-star rating under the QS Stars Rating System and is ranked in the QS Asia University Rankings.

== Integrated University Laboratory Schools ==
MMSU's high school departments were consolidated in July 2009 into the Integrated University Laboratory Schools (IULS), separating them from their former mother colleges. The IULS operates two campuses:

- Laboratory High School – Laoag Campus
- University High School – Science Curriculum (Batac), also known as MMSU Science High School or Laboratory High School – Science Curriculum

== Laboratory Elementary School ==
The Laboratory Elementary School (MMSU-LES) operates two campuses: an established one in Laoag City and a newer one in Batac. The Batac campus opened starting school year 2007–2008, initially offering nursery, kindergarten, and grades 1–3, with one additional grade level added each year until reaching grade six.

== Presidents ==
No.	President / Officer-in-charge	Term	Notes
1	Dr. Consuelo S. Blanco	June 1978 – May 1983	First president
2	Dr. Santiago R. Obien	June 1983 – May 1986	
3	Dr. Felipe B. Cachola	June 1986 – May 1993	
4	Dr. Elias L. Calacal	June 1993 – May 1999	
5	Dr. Saturnino M. Ocampo Jr.	June 1999 – December 2004	
6	Dr. Miriam E. Pascua	May 2005 – 2014	
—	Dr. Prima Fe R. Franco	2014 – July 2017	Officer-in-charge, following Pascua
7	Dr. Shirley C. Agrupis	August 2017 – September 2024	
—	Dr. Prima Fe R. Franco	September 2024 – February 2025	Officer-in-charge, after Agrupis was appointed CHED Commissioner and vacated the presidency
8	Dr. Virgilio Julius P. Manzano Jr.	February 2025 – present	

== See also ==
- List of forestry universities and colleges
