= Jesus Nalupta Sr. =

Atty. Jesus R. Nalupta Sr.
- "Mayor Ukoy"

Mayor of Batac, Ilocos Norte
- In office June 30, 2001 – June 30, 2007
- Preceded by: Ma. Elena M. Nalupta
- Succeeded by: Jeffrey Jubal C. Nalupta
- In office February 2, 1988 – March 27, 1998
- Preceded by: Pastor N. Nalupta
- Succeeded by: Ma. Elena M. Nalupta

Personal details
- Born: Jesus Rosario Nalupta; November 8, 1938 Batac, Ilocos Norte, Commonwealth of the Philippines
- Died: March 31, 2013 (aged 74) Mariano Marcos Memorial Hospital and Medical Center, Batac, Ilocos Norte, Philippines
- Cause of death: Heart Attack
- Resting place: Roman Catholic Cemetery, Batac, Ilocos Norte
- Spouse: Daisy Castro - Nalupta
- Children: Atty. Jesus C. Nalupta Jr. (+); Joseph C. Nalupta (+); Johann C. Nalupta; Jerome C. Nalupta (+); Jeffrey Jubal C. Nalupta; Dr. Jeremiah C. Nalupta; James Paul C. Nalupta; Julius C. Nalupta; Atty. Jason C. Nalupta
- Occupation: Politician, Lawyer

Jesus Rosario Nalupta Sr. was a Filipino lawyer and politician. He served as Mayor of Batac, Ilocos Norte for five terms.

== Early life ==
He was born on November 8, 1938, at Batac, Ilocos Norte to Mariano Nalupta Sr., who was then the mayor of Batac, and Trinidad Rosario. His younger brother, Mariano Jr., was a vice governor of Ilocos Norte, Congressman and Provincial Board Member of the 2nd District of Ilocos Norte and Municipal Councilor of Batac.

== Political career ==
He became Mayor of Batac in 1988 and served until 1998. In 2001, he defeated his sister-in-law, Elena (wife of his brother, Mariano Jr.), who was the incumbent mayor that time, to make a comeback and served until 2007. His son, Jeffrey, later succeeded him as mayor.

After his term as mayor, he became the director of the Ilocos Norte Electric Cooperative (INEC) - Batac District.

== Personal life ==
He was married to Daisy Castro-Nalupta and had 9 children;

- Atty. Jesus "Chito" C. Nalupta Jr. (+), former Legal Consultant of the City of Batac and Board of Director for the Ilocos Norte Electric Cooperative (INEC) - Batac district. Died October 14, 2017.
- Joseph Edward "Jay" C. Nalupta (+), former Barangay Chairman of Brgy. 1 - N Ricarte. Married to City Councilor Violeta Daradar-Nalupta. Died June 14, 2023
- Johann "Jack" C. Nalupta, former Barangay Chairman of Brgy. 3 Cangrunaan and ABC President of Batac.
- Jerome C. Nalupta (+), died as an infant
- Jeffrey Jubal C. Nalupta, former Mayor and Vice-Mayor of Batac.
- Dr. Jeremiah Jawaharlal "Jed" C. Nalupta, a Doctor of Medicine and former City Councilor of Batac.
- James Paul "Goro" C. Nalupta, former Provincial Board Member for the 2nd District of Ilocos Norte, Barangay Chairman of Brgy. 1-N Ricarte, and ABC President of Batac.
- Julius "Julo" C. Nalupta, a businessman and former Kabataang Barangay (KB) President of Batac.
- Atty. Jason C. Nalupta, a Law Graduate of Ateneo Law School.

He has 2 grandchildren who served as SK Federated President of Batac; Justin Lorenz D. Nalupta, served from 2002 to 2007, and Jarius Mark D. Nalupta, served from 2010 to 2013.

== Death ==
Nalupta died of a stroke on the night of March 31, 2013. His wake was held at the Castro - Nalupta Residence in Brgy. 1 - N Ricarte, Batac. His remains were brought to the Batac City Hall, in honor of his five terms as Mayor of Batac, on April 9, 2013.

His funeral was held on April 10, 2013, with a mass at the Immaculate Conception Parish. He is buried alongside his son, Jerome, at the Roman Catholic Cemetery, Batac.

== See also ==
- Batac, Ilocos Norte
- Mariano Nalupta Jr.

Political offices
| Preceded by Pastor N. Nalupta | Mayor of Batac, Ilocos Norte; 1988 - 1998 | Succeeded by Ma. Elena M. Nalupta |
| Preceded by Ma. Elena M. Nalupta | Mayor of Batac, Ilocos Norte; 2001 - 2007 | Succeeded by Jeffrey Jubal C. Nalupta |
