= Ilocos Norte's 2nd congressional district =

Legislative district of the Philippines

- Constituency for the House of Representatives of the Philippines
- Location of Ilocos Norte within the Philippines
- Province: Ilocos Norte
- Region: Ilocos Region
- Population: 297,611 (2020)
- Electorate: 206,090 (2022)
- Major settlements: 11 LGUs: Cities; Batac; Municipalities; Badoc; Banna; Currimao; Dingras; Marcos; Nueva Era; Paoay; Pinili; San Nicolas; Solsona
- Area: 1,420.47 km^{2} (548.45 sq mi)

Current constituency
- Created: 1907
- Representative: Eugenio Angelo M. Barba
- Political party: Nacionalista
- Congressional bloc: Majority

Ilocos Norte's 2nd congressional district is one of the two congressional districts of the Philippines in the province of Ilocos Norte. It has been represented in the House of Representatives of the Philippines since 1916 and earlier in the Philippine Assembly from 1907 to 1916. The district consists of the city of Batac and adjacent municipalities of Badoc, Banna, Currimao, Dingras, Marcos, Nueva Era, Paoay, Pinili, San Nicolas and Solsona. It is currently represented in the 20th Congress by Eugenio Angelo M. Barba of the Nacionalista Party (NP).

== Representation history ==
#	Image	Member	Term of office		Legislature	Party	Electoral history	Constituent LGUs
#	Image	Member	Start	End	Legislature	Party	Electoral history	Constituent LGUs
=== Ilocos Norte's 2nd district for the Philippine Assembly ===
District created January 9, 1907.
1		Baldomero Pobre	October 16, 1907	October 16, 1909	1st	Nacionalista	Elected in 1907.	1907–1909; Badoc, Batac, Dingras, Paoay
2		Lucas Paredes	October 16, 1909	October 16, 1912	2nd	Nacionalista	Elected in 1909.	1909–1916; Badoc, Batac, Dingras, Paoay, San Nicolas, Solsona
3		Teogenes Quiaoit	October 16, 1912	October 16, 1916	3rd	Progresista	Elected in 1912.	1909–1916; Badoc, Batac, Dingras, Paoay, San Nicolas, Solsona
=== Ilocos Norte's 2nd district for the House of Representatives of the Philippine Islands ===
4		Melchor Flor	October 16, 1916	June 3, 1919	4th	Progresista	Elected in 1916.	1916–1919; Badoc, Banna, Batac, Dingras, Paoay, San Nicolas, Solsona
5		Faustino Adiarte	June 3, 1919	June 6, 1922	5th	Nacionalista	Elected in 1919.	1919–1922; Badoc, Banna, Batac, Dingras, Nueva Era, Paoay, Pinili, San Nicolas, Solsona
6		Román Campos	June 6, 1922	June 2, 1925	6th	Nacionalista; Colectivista	Elected in 1922.	1922–1935; Badoc, Banna, Batac, Currimao, Dingras, Nueva Era, Paoay, Pinili, San Nicolas, Solsona
7		Mariano Marcos	June 2, 1925	June 2, 1931	7th	Nacionalista; Consolidado	Elected in 1925.	1922–1935; Badoc, Banna, Batac, Currimao, Dingras, Nueva Era, Paoay, Pinili, San Nicolas, Solsona
7		Mariano Marcos	June 2, 1925	June 2, 1931	8th	Nacionalista; Consolidado	Re-elected in 1928.	1922–1935; Badoc, Banna, Batac, Currimao, Dingras, Nueva Era, Paoay, Pinili, San Nicolas, Solsona
8		Emilio L. Medina	June 2, 1931	June 5, 1934	9th	Nacionalista; Consolidado	Elected in 1931.	1922–1935; Badoc, Banna, Batac, Currimao, Dingras, Nueva Era, Paoay, Pinili, San Nicolas, Solsona
9		Julio Nalundasan	June 5, 1934	September 20, 1935	10th	Nacionalista; Democrático	Elected in 1934. Died.	1922–1935; Badoc, Banna, Batac, Currimao, Dingras, Nueva Era, Paoay, Pinili, San Nicolas, Solsona
#	Image	Member	Term of office		National Assembly	Party	Electoral history	Constituent LGUs
#	Image	Member	Start	End	National Assembly	Party	Electoral history	Constituent LGUs
=== Ilocos Norte's 2nd district for the National Assembly (Commonwealth of the Philippines) ===
(9)		Julio Nalundasan	–	–	1st	Nacionalista; Democrático	Re-elected in 1935. Died before start of term.	1935–1941; Badoc, Banna, Batac, Currimao, Dingras, Nueva Era, Paoay, Pinili, San Nicolas, Solsona
10		Ulpiano Arzadon	September 1, 1936	December 30, 1941	1st	Nacionalista; Democrático	Elected in 1936 to finish Nalundasan's term.	1935–1941; Badoc, Banna, Batac, Currimao, Dingras, Nueva Era, Paoay, Pinili, San Nicolas, Solsona
10		Ulpiano Arzadon	September 1, 1936	December 30, 1941	2nd	Nacionalista	Re-elected in 1938.	1935–1941; Badoc, Banna, Batac, Currimao, Dingras, Nueva Era, Paoay, Pinili, San Nicolas, Solsona
District dissolved into the two-seat Ilocos Norte's at-large district for the National Assembly (Second Philippine Republic).
#	Image	Member	Term of office		Common wealth Congress	Party	Electoral history	Constituent LGUs
#	Image	Member	Start	End	Common wealth Congress	Party	Electoral history	Constituent LGUs
=== Ilocos Norte's 2nd district for the House of Representatives of the Commonwealth of the Philippines ===
District re-created May 24, 1945.
11		Conrado Rubio	June 11, 1945	May 25, 1946	1st	Nacionalista	Elected in 1941.	1945–1946; Badoc, Banna, Batac, Currimao, Dingras, Nueva Era, Paoay, Pinili, San Nicolas, Solsona
#	Image	Member	Term of office		Congress	Party	Electoral history	Constituent LGUs
#	Image	Member	Start	End	Congress	Party	Electoral history	Constituent LGUs
=== Ilocos Norte's 2nd district for the House of Representatives of the Philippines ===
12		Pedro G. Albano	May 25, 1946	December 30, 1949	1st	Liberal	Elected in 1946.	1946–1965; Badoc, Banna, Batac, Currimao, Dingras, Nueva Era, Paoay, Pinili, San Nicolas, Solsona
13		Ferdinand Marcos	December 30, 1949	December 30, 1959	2nd	Liberal	Elected in 1949.	1946–1965; Badoc, Banna, Batac, Currimao, Dingras, Nueva Era, Paoay, Pinili, San Nicolas, Solsona
13		Ferdinand Marcos	December 30, 1949	December 30, 1959	3rd	Liberal	Re-elected in 1953.	1946–1965; Badoc, Banna, Batac, Currimao, Dingras, Nueva Era, Paoay, Pinili, San Nicolas, Solsona
13		Ferdinand Marcos	December 30, 1949	December 30, 1959	4th	Liberal	Re-elected in 1957. Resigned on election as senator.	1946–1965; Badoc, Banna, Batac, Currimao, Dingras, Nueva Era, Paoay, Pinili, San Nicolas, Solsona
14		Simeon Valdez	December 30, 1961	September 23, 1972	5th	Nacionalista	Elected in 1961.	1946–1965; Badoc, Banna, Batac, Currimao, Dingras, Nueva Era, Paoay, Pinili, San Nicolas, Solsona
14		Simeon Valdez	December 30, 1961	September 23, 1972	6th	Nacionalista	Re-elected in 1965.	1965–1972; Badoc, Batac, Currimao, Dingras, Espiritu, Marcos, Nueva Era, Paoay, Pinili, San Nicolas, Solsona
14		Simeon Valdez	December 30, 1961	September 23, 1972	7th	Nacionalista	Re-elected in 1969. Removed from office after imposition of martial law.	1965–1972; Badoc, Batac, Currimao, Dingras, Espiritu, Marcos, Nueva Era, Paoay, Pinili, San Nicolas, Solsona
District dissolved into the twelve-seat Region I's at-large district for the Interim Batasang Pambansa, followed by the two-seat Ilocos Norte's at-large district for the Regular Batasang Pambansa.
District re-created February 2, 1987.
15		Mariano R. Nalupta Jr.	June 30, 1987	June 30, 1992	8th	KBL	Elected in 1987.	1987–1998; Badoc, Batac, Currimao, Dingras, Espiritu, Marcos, Nueva Era, Paoay, Pinili, San Nicolas, Solsona
16		Bongbong Marcos	June 30, 1992	June 30, 1995	9th	KBL	Elected in 1992.	1987–1998; Badoc, Batac, Currimao, Dingras, Espiritu, Marcos, Nueva Era, Paoay, Pinili, San Nicolas, Solsona
(14)		Simeon Valdez	June 30, 1995	June 30, 1998	10th	Lakas	Elected in 1995.	1987–1998; Badoc, Batac, Currimao, Dingras, Espiritu, Marcos, Nueva Era, Paoay, Pinili, San Nicolas, Solsona
17		Imee Marcos	June 30, 1998	June 30, 2007	11th	KBL	Elected in 1998.	1998–present Badoc, Banna, Batac, Currimao, Dingras, Marcos, Nueva Era, Paoay, Pinili, San Nicolas, Solsona
17		Imee Marcos	June 30, 1998	June 30, 2007	12th	KBL	Re-elected in 2001.	1998–present Badoc, Banna, Batac, Currimao, Dingras, Marcos, Nueva Era, Paoay, Pinili, San Nicolas, Solsona
17		Imee Marcos	June 30, 1998	June 30, 2007	13th	KBL	Re-elected in 2004.	1998–present Badoc, Banna, Batac, Currimao, Dingras, Marcos, Nueva Era, Paoay, Pinili, San Nicolas, Solsona
(16)		Bongbong Marcos	June 30, 2007	June 30, 2010	14th	KBL	Elected in 2007.	1998–present Badoc, Banna, Batac, Currimao, Dingras, Marcos, Nueva Era, Paoay, Pinili, San Nicolas, Solsona
(16)		Bongbong Marcos	June 30, 2007	June 30, 2010	14th	Nacionalista	Elected in 2007.	1998–present Badoc, Banna, Batac, Currimao, Dingras, Marcos, Nueva Era, Paoay, Pinili, San Nicolas, Solsona
18		Imelda Marcos	June 30, 2010	June 30, 2019	15th	KBL (Nacionalista)	Elected in 2010.	1998–present Badoc, Banna, Batac, Currimao, Dingras, Marcos, Nueva Era, Paoay, Pinili, San Nicolas, Solsona
18		Imelda Marcos	June 30, 2010	June 30, 2019	16th	KBL (Nacionalista)	Re-elected in 2013.	1998–present Badoc, Banna, Batac, Currimao, Dingras, Marcos, Nueva Era, Paoay, Pinili, San Nicolas, Solsona
18		Imelda Marcos	June 30, 2010	June 30, 2019	17th	Nacionalista	Re-elected in 2016.	1998–present Badoc, Banna, Batac, Currimao, Dingras, Marcos, Nueva Era, Paoay, Pinili, San Nicolas, Solsona
19		Eugenio Angelo M. Barba	June 30, 2019	Incumbent	18th	Nacionalista	Elected in 2019.	1998–present Badoc, Banna, Batac, Currimao, Dingras, Marcos, Nueva Era, Paoay, Pinili, San Nicolas, Solsona
19		Eugenio Angelo M. Barba	June 30, 2019	Incumbent	19th	Nacionalista	Re-elected in 2022.	1998–present Badoc, Banna, Batac, Currimao, Dingras, Marcos, Nueva Era, Paoay, Pinili, San Nicolas, Solsona
19		Eugenio Angelo M. Barba	June 30, 2019	Incumbent	20th	Nacionalista	Re-elected in 2025.	1998–present Badoc, Banna, Batac, Currimao, Dingras, Marcos, Nueva Era, Paoay, Pinili, San Nicolas, Solsona

== Election results ==
=== 2025 ===
Candidate	Party	Votes	%
Eugenio Angelo Barba (incumbent)	Nacionalista Party	137,658	100.00
Total		137,658	100.00
Valid votes		137,658	73.97
Invalid/blank votes		48,440	26.03
Total votes		186,098	100.00
Registered voters/turnout		207,316	89.77
Nacionalista Party hold			
Source: Commission on Elections

=== 2022 ===
2022 Philippine House of Representatives elections
Party	Candidate	Votes	%
Nacionalista	Eugenio Angelo Barba (incumbent)	127,867	
Reporma	Jeffrey Jubal Nalupta	30,920	
PDP–Laban	Juanito Antonio	2,897	
Total votes			
Nacionalista hold			

=== 2019 ===
2019 Philippine House of Representatives elections
Party	Candidate	Votes	%
Nacionalista	Eugenio Angelo Barba	87,725	
Aksyon	Hilario Valdez	58,020	
PDDS	Marynette Gamboa	9,646	
Total votes			
Nacionalista hold			

=== 2016 ===
2016 Philippine House of Representatives elections
Party	Candidate	Votes	%
Nacionalista	Imelda Marcos (incumbent)	134,725	98.47
Independent	Lorenzo Madamba	2,095	1.53
Valid ballots		136,820	87.70
Invalid or blank votes		19,193	12.30
Total votes		156,013	100.00
Nacionalista hold			

=== 2013 ===
2013 Philippine House of Representatives elections
Party	Candidate	Votes	%
KBL	Imelda Marcos	94,484	76.13
Independent	Ferdinand Ignacio	11,221	9.04
Independent	Lorenzo Madamba	1,647	1.33
Margin of victory		83,263	67.09%
Invalid or blank votes		16,755	13.50
Total votes		124,107	100.00
KBL hold			

=== 2010 ===
2010 Philippine House of Representatives elections
Party	Candidate	Votes	%
KBL	Imelda Marcos	109,571	80.02
Lakas–Kampi	Mariano Nalupta, Jr.	27,359	19.98
Valid ballots		136,930	94.56
Invalid or blank votes		7,873	5.44
Total votes		144,803	100.00
KBL gain from Nacionalista			

=== 1936 special ===
1936 Philippine National Assembly special election in Ilocos Norte's 2nd district
Candidate	Votes	%
Ulpiano Arzadon	7,452	68.90
Mariano Marcos	2,597	24.01
Juan Root	766	7.08
Total votes	10,815	100.00

== See also ==
- Legislative districts of Ilocos Norte
