= Currimao =

Municipality in Ilocos Norte, Philippines

- Municipality
- Municipality of Currimao
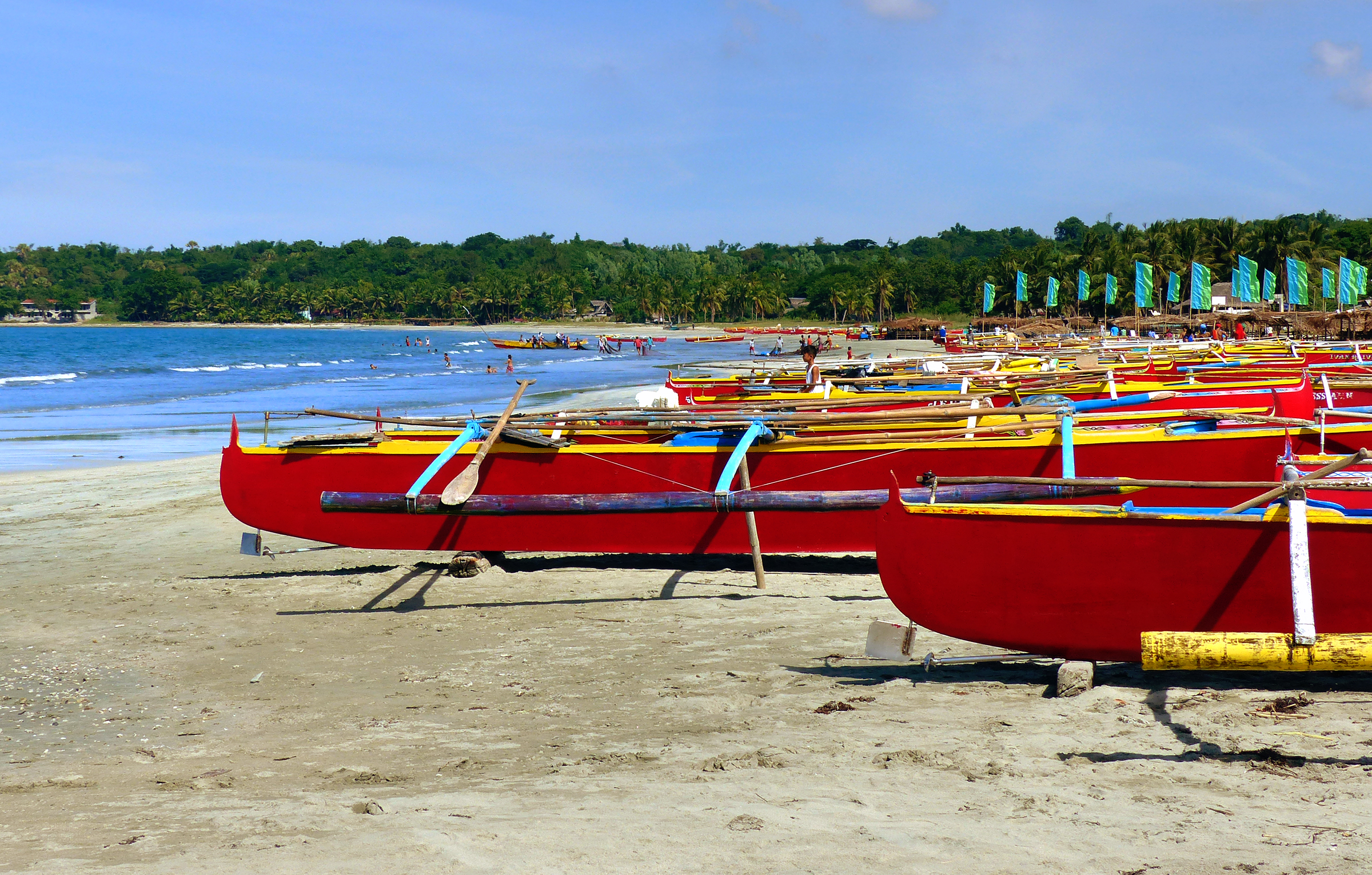
- Boats in the beach

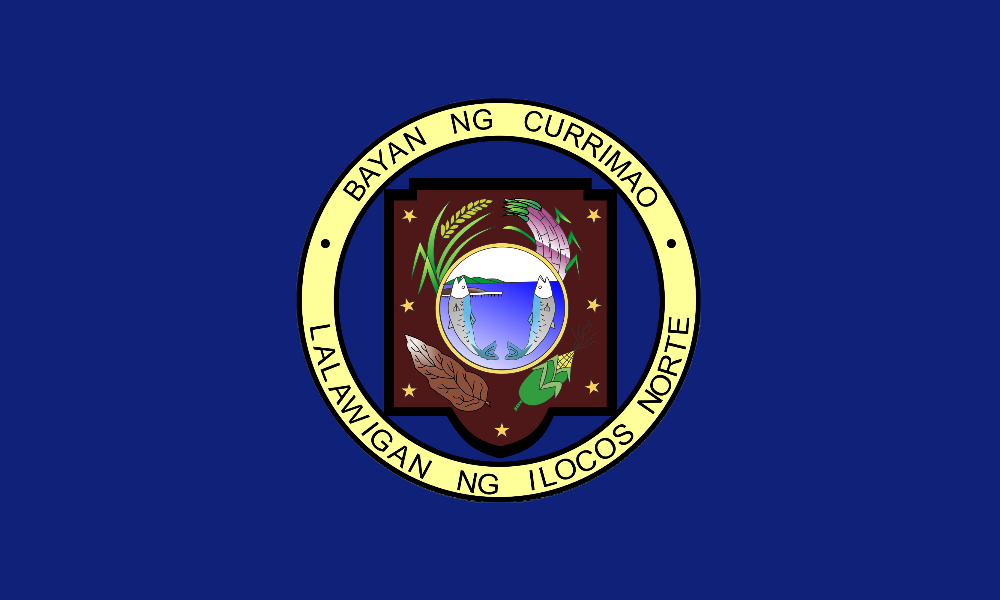
- Flag Seal

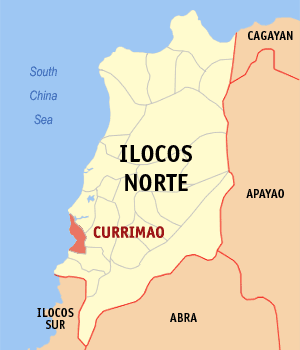
- Map of Ilocos Norte with Currimao highlighted
- Interactive map of Currimao
- Location within the Philippines
- Coordinates: 18°01′13″N 120°29′11″E
- Country: Philippines
- Region: Ilocos Region
- Province: Ilocos Norte
- District: 2nd district
- Barangays: 23 (see Barangays)

Government
  - Type: Sangguniang Bayan
  - Mayor: Edward T. Quilala
  - Vice Mayor: Sandra T. Cabreros
  - Representative: Eugenio Angelo M. Barba
  - Municipal Council: Members: Charles Anthony P. Lazo; Elmer D. Reyno; Mark Louie S. Aglipay; Jay Lord G. Fernando; Reuben S. Silao; Isabelo Z. Aglipay III; Margarita G. Allado; Loreto P. Vidad
  - Electorate: 10,473 voters (2025)

Area
  - Total: 34.08 km^{2} (13.16 sq mi)
- Elevation: 15 m (49 ft)
- Highest elevation: 88 m (289 ft)
- Lowest elevation: 0 m (0 ft)

Population (2024 census)
  - Total: 12,256
  - Density: 359.6/km^{2} (931.4/sq mi)
  - Households: 3,088

Economy
  - Income class: 3rd municipal income class
  - Poverty incidence: 4.69% (2023)
  - Revenue: ₱ 327.8 million (2024)
  - Assets: ₱ 669.8 million (2024)
  - Expenditure: ₱ 161.4 million (2024)
  - Liabilities: ₱ 178.9 million (2024)

Service provider
  - Electricity: Ilocos Norte Electric Cooperative (INEC)
- Time zone: UTC+8 (PST)
- ZIP code: 2903
- PSGC: 0102808000
- IDD : area code: +63 (0)77
- Native languages: Ilocano; Tagalog

Currimao, officially the Municipality of Currimao (Ilocano: Ili ti Currimao; Filipino: Bayan ng Currimao), is a municipality in the province of Ilocos Norte, Philippines. According to the 2024 census, it has a population of 12,256 people.

== Geography ==
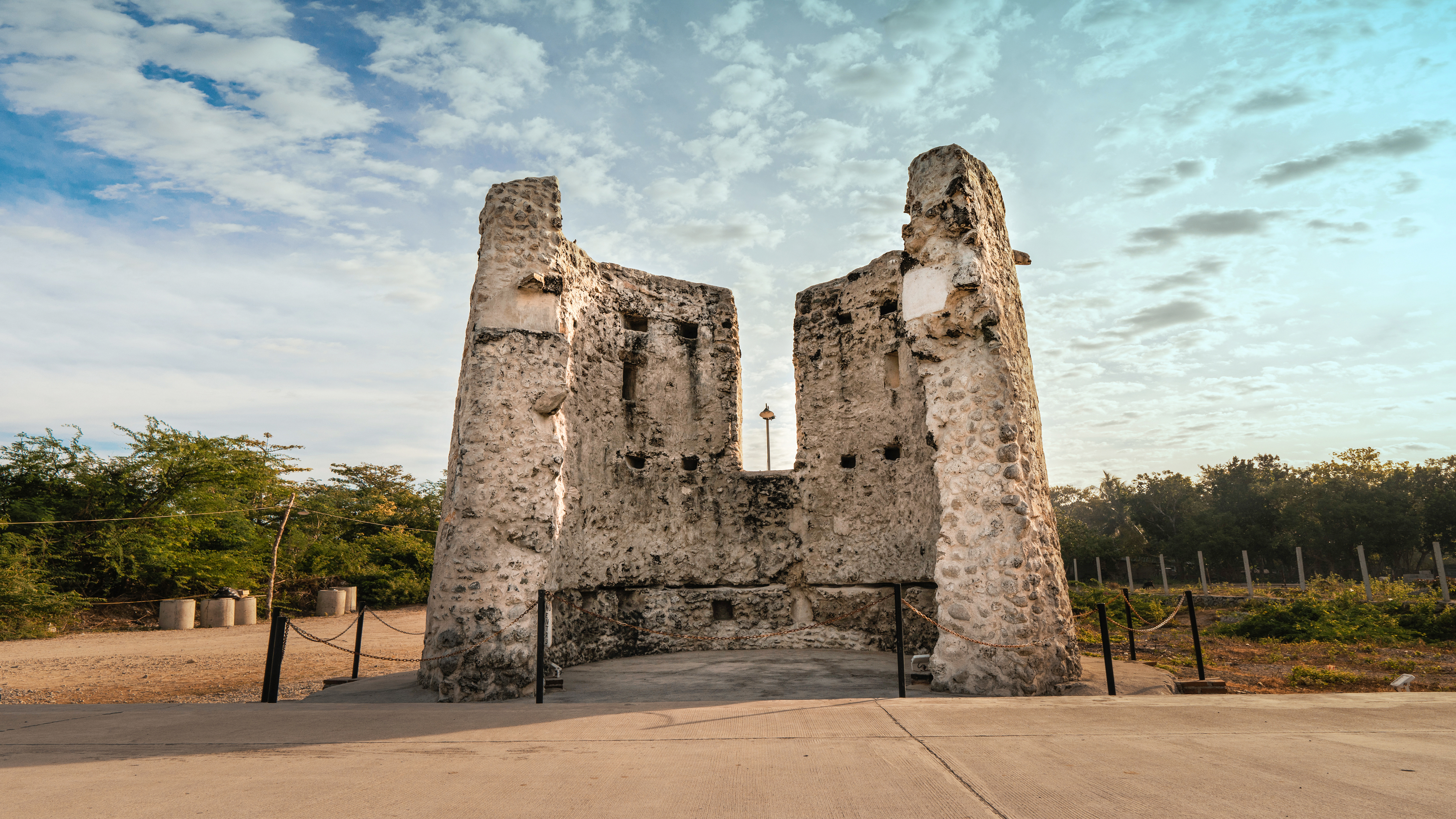
Spanish colonial-era watchtower at Brgy. Torre, a National Cultural Treasure

The Municipality of Currimao is bordered by Pinili to the south, Batac to the east, the South China Sea to the west, and Paoay to the north.

Currimao is situated 26.49 kilometres (16.46 mi) from the provincial capital Laoag, and 459.58 kilometres (285.57 mi) from the country's capital city of Manila.

=== Barangays ===
Currimao is politically subdivided into 23 barangays. Each barangay consists of puroks and some have sitios.

- Anggapang Norte
- Anggapang Sur
- Bimmanga
- Cabuusan
- Comcomloong
- Gaang
- Lang-ayan-Baramban
- Lioes
- Maglaoi Centro
- Maglaoi Norte
- Maglaoi Sur
- Paguludan-Salindeg
- Pangil
- Pias Norte
- Pias Sur
- Poblacion I
- Poblacion II
- Salugan
- San Simeon
- Santa Cruz
- Tapao-Tigue
- Torre
- Victoria

=== Climate ===
Climate data for Currimao, Ilocos Norte
Month	Jan	Feb	Mar	Apr	May	Jun	Jul	Aug	Sep	Oct	Nov	Dec	Year
Mean daily maximum °C (°F)	30 (86)	31 (88)	33 (91)	34 (93)	33 (91)	31 (88)	30 (86)	30 (86)	30 (86)	31 (88)	30 (86)	29 (84)	31 (88)
Mean daily minimum °C (°F)	19 (66)	19 (66)	21 (70)	23 (73)	24 (75)	25 (77)	24 (75)	24 (75)	24 (75)	22 (72)	21 (70)	19 (66)	22 (72)
Average precipitation mm (inches)	9 (0.4)	11 (0.4)	13 (0.5)	23 (0.9)	92 (3.6)	122 (4.8)	153 (6.0)	137 (5.4)	139 (5.5)	141 (5.6)	42 (1.7)	14 (0.6)	896 (35.4)
Average rainy days	4.6	4.0	6.2	9.1	19.5	23.2	24.0	22.5	21.5	15.2	10.5	6.0	166.3
Source: Meteoblue (modeled/calculated data, not measured locally)

== Demographics ==
Population census of Currimao

Year	Pop.	±% p.a.
1939	4,494	—
1948	4,296	−0.50%
1960	5,435	+1.98%
1970	8,369	+4.41%
1975	10,018	+3.67%
1980	7,810	−4.86%
1990	9,467	+1.94%

Year	Pop.	±% p.a.
1995	10,133	+1.28%
2000	10,615	+1.00%
2007	11,305	+0.87%
2010	11,970	+2.10%
2015	12,184	+0.34%
2020	12,215	+0.05%
2024	12,256	+0.08%

Source: Philippine Statistics Authority

In the 2024 census, the population of Currimao was 12,256 people, with a density of 360 inhabitants per square kilometre or 930 inhabitants per square mile.

== Economy ==
Poverty incidence of Currimao (%)

Source: Philippine Statistics Authority

The key economic sources of economy in Currimao are fishing and agriculture. The major crops of Currimao are rice, corn, tobacco and garlic. The municipality has a seaport that serves as an international cruise ship port.

== Government ==
=== Local government ===
Currimao, belonging to the second congressional district of the province of Ilocos Norte, is governed by a mayor designated as its local chief executive and by a municipal council as its legislative body in accordance with the Local Government Code. The mayor, vice mayor, and the councilors are elected directly by the people through an election which is being held every three years.

=== Elected officials ===
Members of the Municipal Council (2025–2028)
Position	Name
Congressman	Eugenio Angelo M. Barba
Mayor	Edward T. Quilala
Vice-Mayor	Judith B. Quilala
Councilors	Reuben S. Silao
Councilors	Elmer D. Reyno
Councilors	Myar U. Gonzales
Councilors	Margarita G. Allado
Councilors	Janet G. Aglipay
Councilors	Jay Lord G. Fernando
Councilors	Gemma N. Fernando
Councilors	Mark Louie S. Aglipay

== Education ==
The Currimao Schools District Office governs all public and private elementary and high schools throughout the municipality.

=== Primary and elementary schools ===
- Bimmanga Elementary School
- Comcomloong-Anggapang Primary School
- Doña Josefa E. Marcos Elementary School
- Langayan Elementary School
- Maglaoi Elementary School
- Paguludan Primary School
- Pangil Elementary School
- Pias-Gaang Elementary School
- Wilbur C. Go Elementary School

=== Secondary schools ===
- Currimao National High School
- Wilbur C. Go National High School
