= Batac =

Component city in Ilocos Norte, Philippines

- Component city
- City of Batac
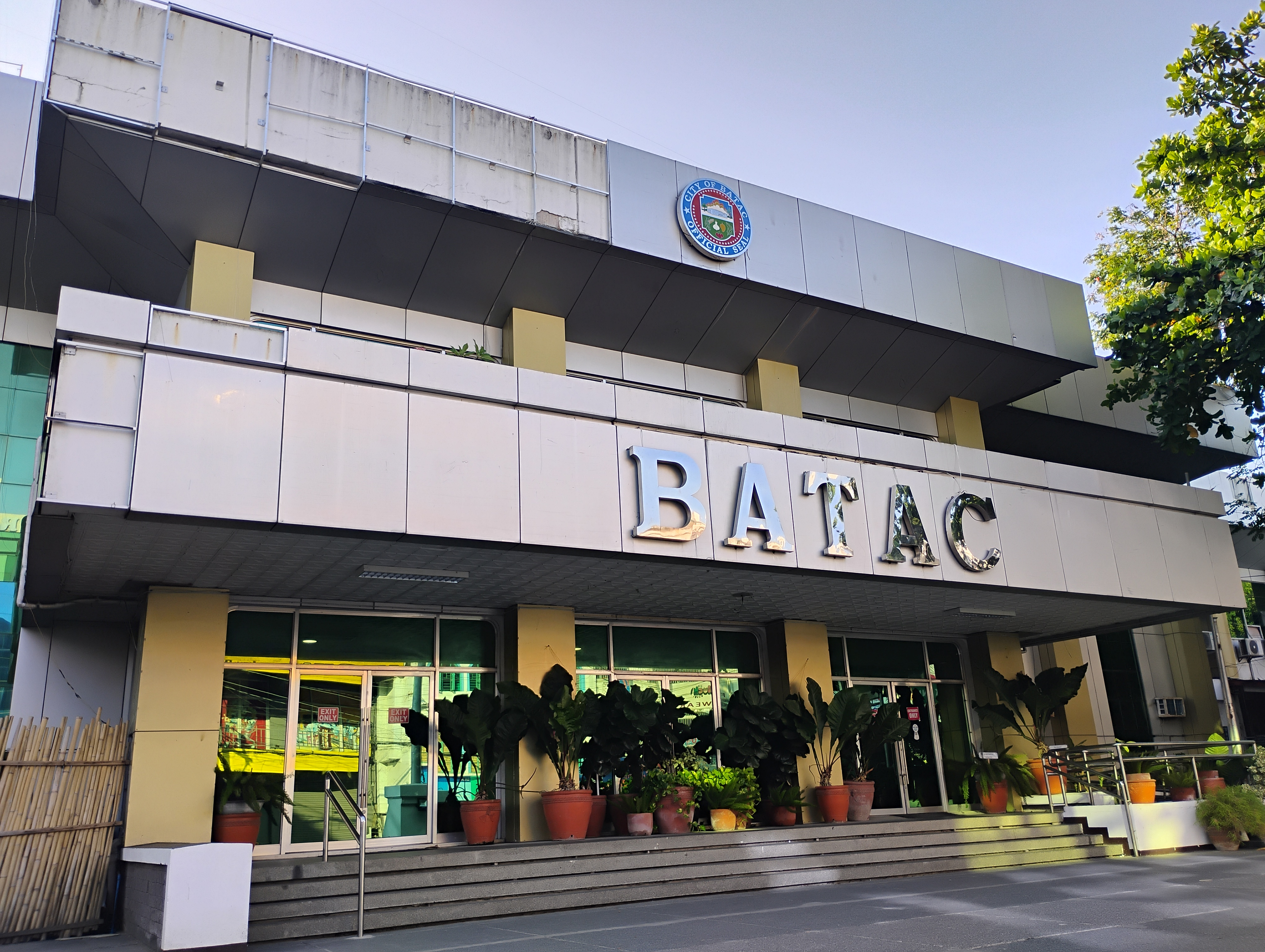
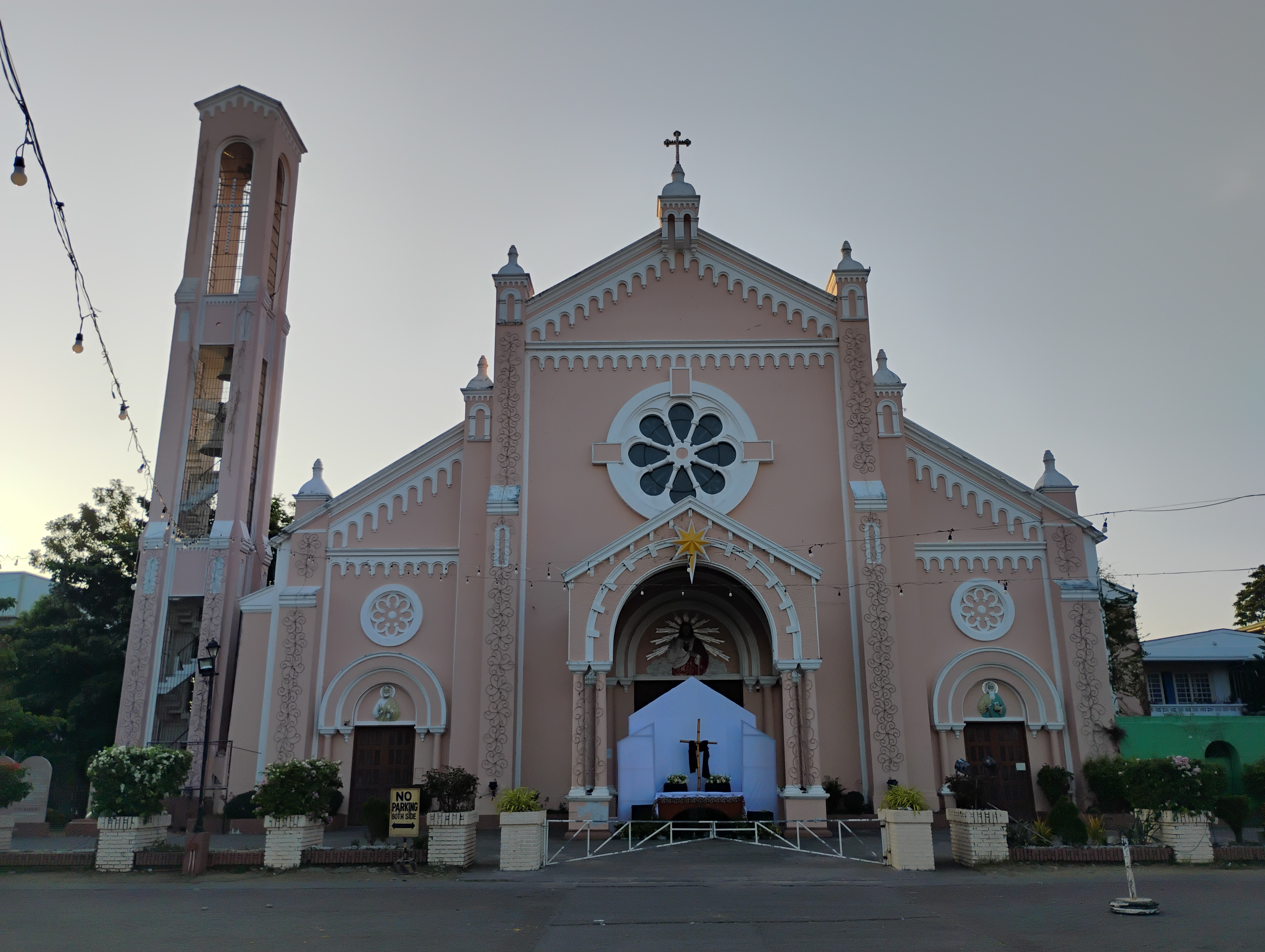
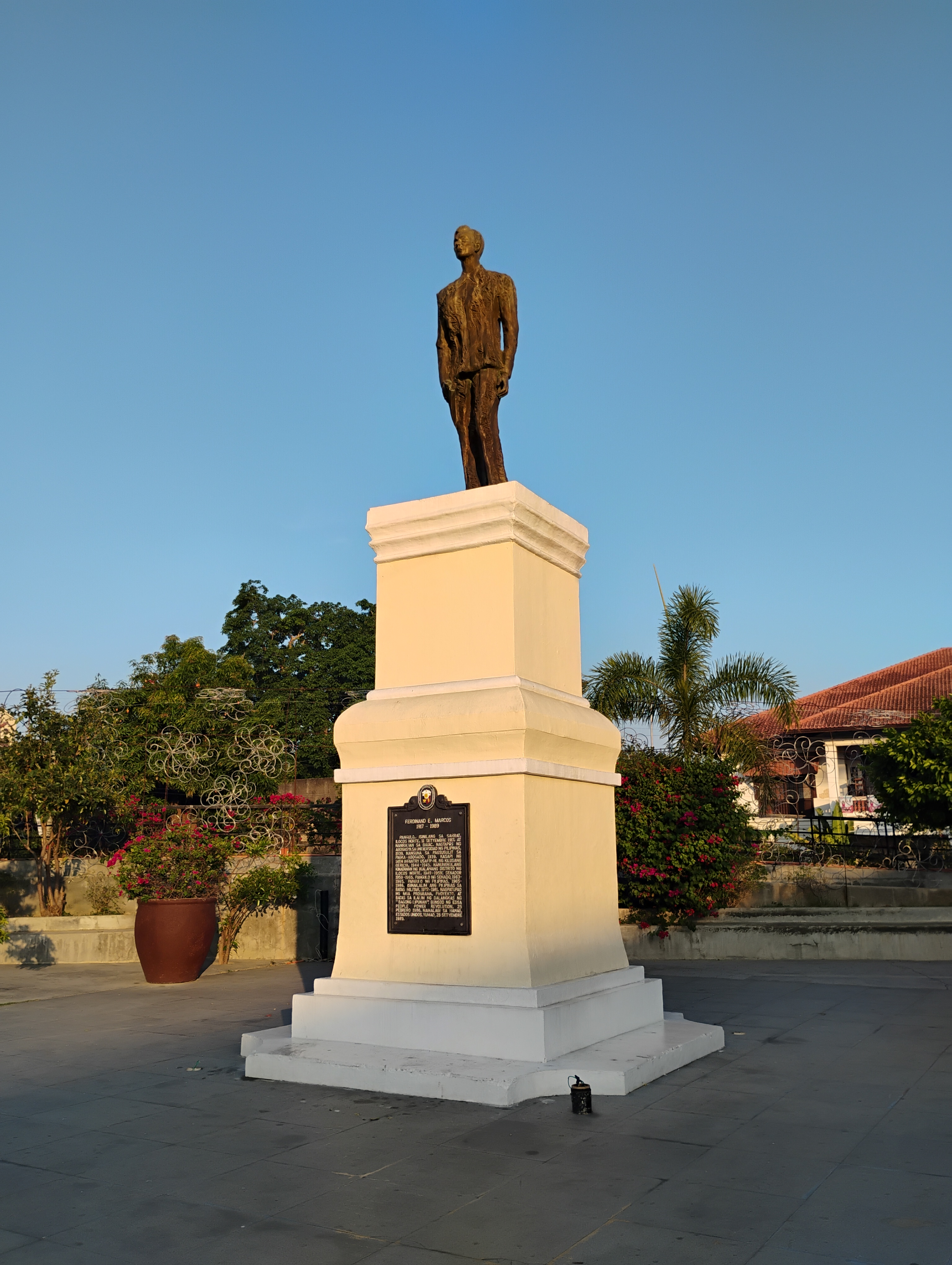
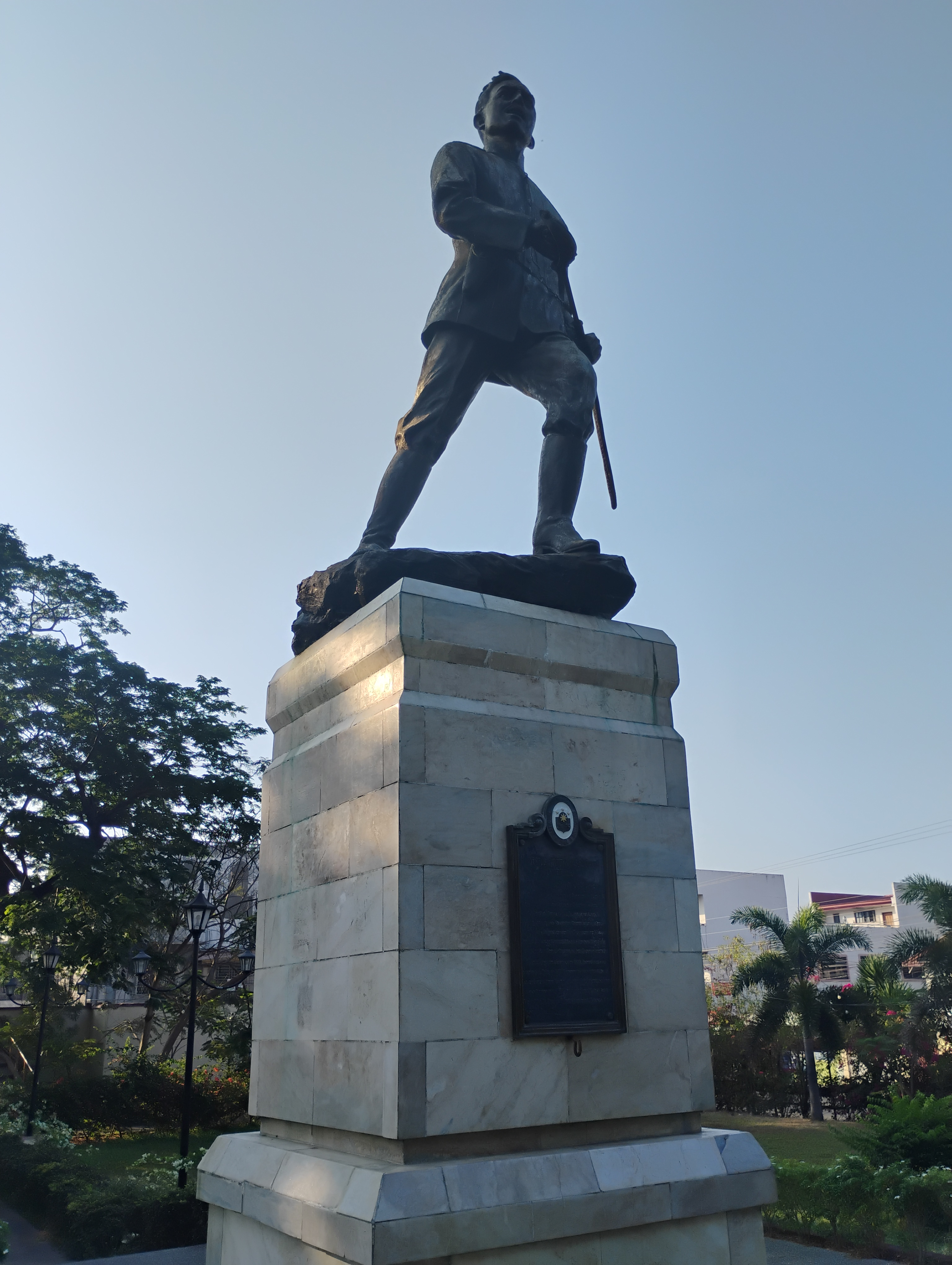
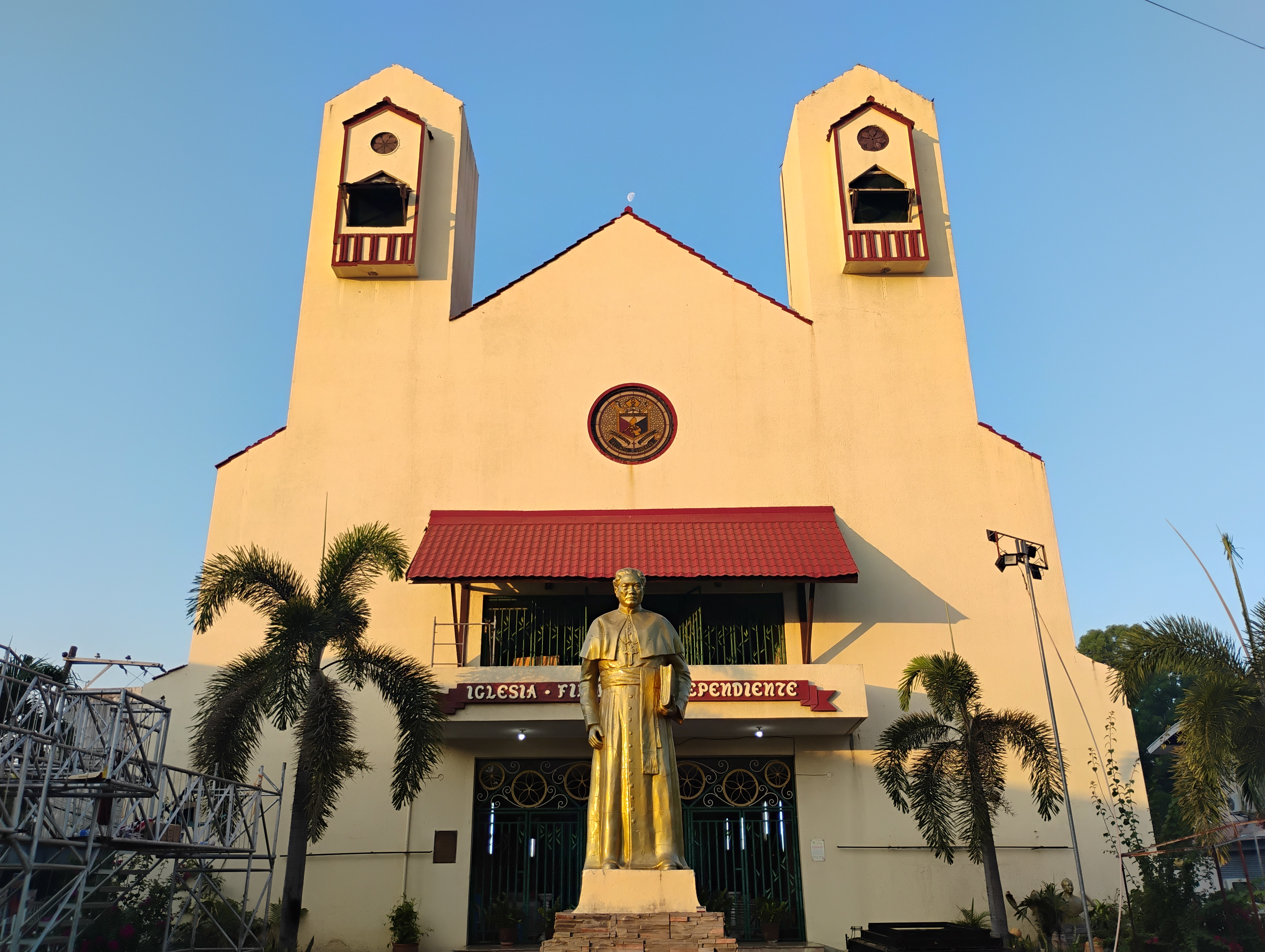
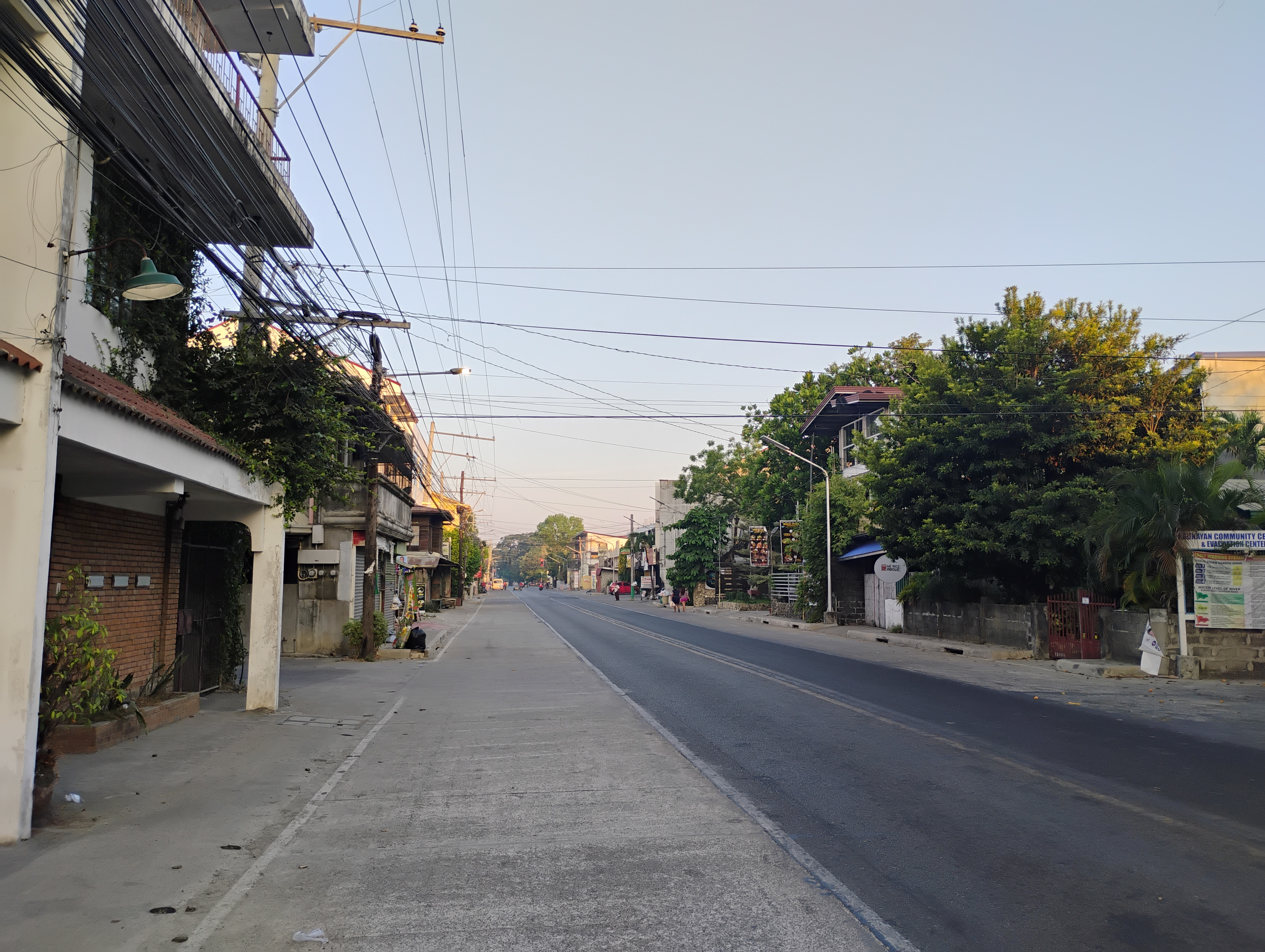
- Batac City Hall Immaculate Conception Parish Church Ferdinand E. Marcos Monument Gen. Artemio Ricarte Monument Aglipay National Shrine Marcos Avenue

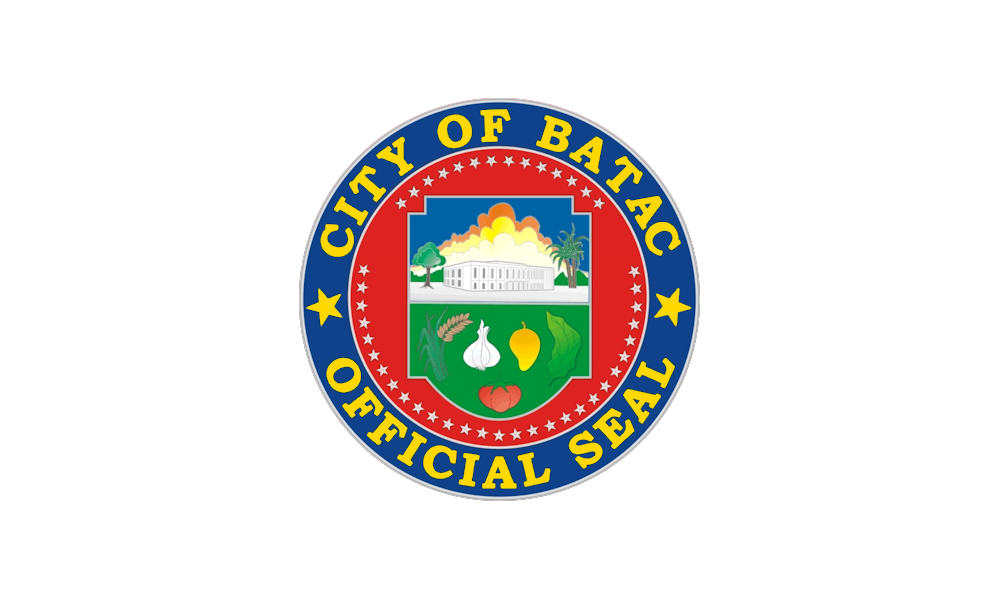
- Flag Seal

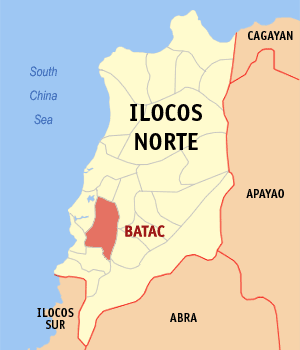
- Map of Ilocos Norte with Batac highlighted
- Interactive map of Batac
- Location within the Philippines
- Coordinates: 18°03′19″N 120°33′54″E
- Country: Philippines
- Region: Ilocos Region
- Province: Ilocos Norte
- District: 2nd district
- Founded: 1587
- Cityhood: June 23, 2007
- Affirmed Cityhood: February 15, 2011
- Barangays: 43 (see Barangays)

Government
  - Type: Sangguniang Panlungsod
  - Mayor: Mark Christian R. Chua
  - Vice Mayor: Albert D. Chua
  - Representative: Eugenio Angelo M. Barba
  - City Council: Members: Kichel Jomarie G. Pungtilan; Eleuterio A. Salamangkit, Jr.; Martha Louise Aurora M. Borleo; Gwyneth S. Quidang; John Gabrielle Dominique M. Daguio; Lucky Rene G. Bunye; Violeta Eugenia D. Nalupta; MacArthur A. Aguinaldo; Rizal P. Castillo; Juan Paulo P. Flojo; Gilbert O. Medina (ABC President); Reign Gwendia T. Mirasol (SK President)
  - Electorate: 40,096 voters (2025)

Area
  - Total: 161.06 km^{2} (62.19 sq mi)
- Elevation: 65 m (213 ft)
- Highest elevation: 1,457 m (4,780 ft)
- Lowest elevation: 0 m (0 ft)

Population (2024 census)
  - Total: 56,781
  - Density: 352.55/km^{2} (913.09/sq mi)
  - Households: 13,970

Economy
  - Income class: 3rd city income class
  - Poverty incidence: 3.49% (2023)
  - Revenue: ₱ 1,280 million (2024)
  - Assets: ₱ 4,524 million (2024)
  - Expenditure: ₱ 801.2 million (2024)
  - Liabilities: ₱ 758 million (2024)

Service provider
  - Electricity: Ilocos Norte Electric Cooperative (INEC)
- Time zone: UTC+8 (PST)
- ZIP code: 2906
- PSGC: 0102805000
- IDD : area code: +63 (0)77
- Native languages: Ilocano; Tagalog
- Website: batac.gov.ph

Batac, officially the City of Batac (Ilocano: Siudad ti Batac; Filipino: Lungsod ng Batac), is a component city in the province of Ilocos Norte, Philippines. According to the 2024 census, it has a population of 56,781 people.

== Etymology ==
According to a legend set in pre-Hispanic Batac, a man fell into a deep hole while he was digging for the root crop "camangeg". He struggled to get out but could not despite his best efforts. He cried for help but nobody was around. He waited for hours and had given up hope of being saved. Two men from the neighboring town of Paoay happened to pass by. They heard the man shouting and traced it to where he was trapped. Upon seeing him, they heard the man said "Batakennak! Batakennak!" The two men did not understand until the man explained that he was saying, "Pull me up! Pull me up!" They did just that. When the two men reached their hometown, they told their story to their friends. Since then, the town has been called "Batac," which is derived from the word "batakennak."

The word batac also translates to "pull" in the Ilocano language. More loosely, it refers to "the people's pulling their efforts together."

== History ==
Batac was founded by the Augustinians in 1587 under the patronage of the Immaculate Conception. It is the second oldest town established by the Augustinians in the province of Ilocos Norte. Hence, in 1987, Batac reached its fourth centennial.

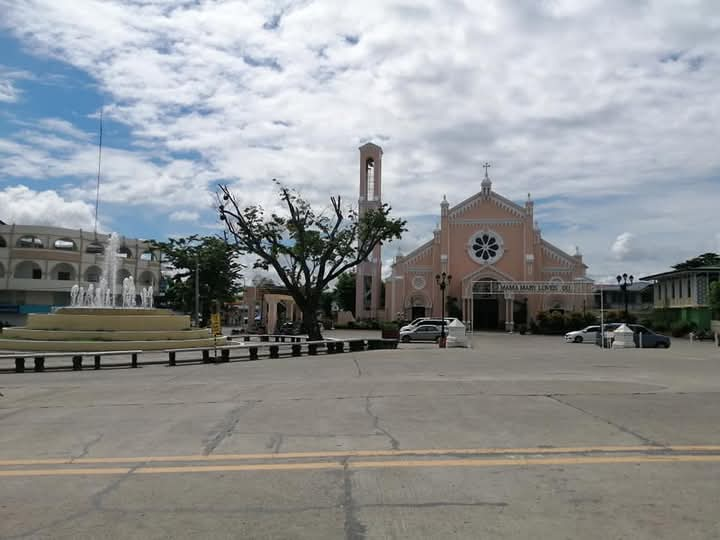
Immaculate Concepcion Parish Church, Batac, Ilocos Norte

Batac was officially organized into a ministry on January 5, 1586. The first priest assigned to cathecize the natives of the community was Esteban Marin, an Augustinian who probably arrived in Batac in 1585. Paoay and Dinglas (Dingras) were then the visitas of Batac.

Folk history states that there were two villages in Batac during the early part of the foundation of the town - one was an Itneg community that occupied sitio Nangalisan, and the other was a Christian community occupying San José.

The first site of the poblacion was in San José, which is now called Barangay Palpalicong. It is said that the ethnic minority groups of Bangui and Nueva Era are the descendants of the early inhabitants of Batac.

The Augustinians considered the people of Batac more civilized than the other tribes, because they were better than the other "Indios" in personal cleanliness.

=== Cityhood ===
Republic Act 9407, the law that converted the Municipality of Batac into a component city in the Province of Ilocos Norte, to be known as Batac City, was overwhelmingly ratified by the people in a plebiscite conducted on June 23, 2007.

The Supreme Court declared the cityhood law of Batac and 15 other cities unconstitutional after a petition filed by the League of Cities of the Philippines in its ruling on November 18, 2008. On December 22, 2009, the cityhood law of Batac and 15 other municipalities regain its status as cities again after the court reversed its ruling on November 18, 2008. On August 23, 2010, the court reinstated its ruling on November 18, 2008, causing Batac and 15 cities to become regular municipalities. Finally, on February 15, 2011, Batac becomes a city again including the 15 municipalities declaring that the conversion to cityhood met all legal requirements.

After six years of legal battle, in its board resolution, the League of Cities of the Philippines acknowledged and recognized the cityhood of Batac and 15 other cities.

== Geography ==
The City of Batac is located in the northwest of Luzon island, about 11 kilometres (6.8 mi) from the eastern shores of the South China Sea. The municipalities of Banna, Currimao, Paoay, Pinili, Sarrat, Marcos, and San Nicolas form its boundaries.

Batac is situated 17.53 kilometres (10.89 mi) from the provincial capital Laoag, and 466.38 kilometres (289.80 mi) from the country's capital city of Manila.

=== Barangays ===
Batac is politically subdivided into 43 barangays, 14 of which constitute the poblacion. Each barangay consists of puroks and some have sitios.

- Brgy. 1-N Ricarte (Nalasin) (Pob.)
- Brgy. 1-S Valdez (Caoayan) (Pob.)
- Brgy. 2 Ablan (Labucao) (Pob)
- Brgy. 3 Cangrunaan (Pob.)
- Brgy. 4 Nalupta (Suabit) (Pob.)
- Brgy. 5 Cal-laguip (Pob.)
- Brgy. 6 San Julian (Pob.)
- Brgy. 7 Caunayan (Pob.)
- Brgy. 8 Acosta (Iloilo) (Pob.)
- Brgy. 9 Aglipay (Calungbuyan) (Pob.)
- Brgy. 10-N Lacub (Pob.)
- Brgy. 10-S Barani (Pob.)
- Brgy. 11 Ben-Agan (Pob.)
- Brgy. 12 Palpalicong (San Josef) (Pob.)
- Brgy. 13 Baay
- Brgy. 14 Bungon
- Brgy. 15 Baligat
- Brgy. 16-N Quiling Norte
- Brgy. 16-S Quiling Sur
- Brgy. 17 Tabug
- Brgy. 18 Magnuang
- Brgy. 19 Pimentel (Cubol)
- Brgy. 20-N Colo
- Brgy. 20-S Mabaleng
- Brgy. 21 Quiom
- Brgy. 22 Maipalig
- Brgy. 23 Biningan
- Brgy. 24 Sumader
- Brgy. 25-N Camguidan
- Brgy. 25-S Payao
- Brgy. 26 Parangopong
- Brgy. 27-E Capacuan
- Brgy. 27-W Naguirangan
- Brgy. 28 San Mateo
- Brgy. 29 San Pedro
- Brgy. 30-E Baoa East
- Brgy. 30-W Baoa West
- Brgy. 31 Camandingan
- Brgy. 32 Palongpong
- Brgy. 33-N Nagbacalan
- Brgy. 33-S Rayuray
- Brgy. 34 Dariwdiw
- Brgy. 35 Bil-loca

=== Climate ===
Climate data for Batac City, Ilocos Norte
Month	Jan	Feb	Mar	Apr	May	Jun	Jul	Aug	Sep	Oct	Nov	Dec	Year
Mean daily maximum °C (°F)	27 (81)	28 (82)	30 (86)	32 (90)	31 (88)	31 (88)	30 (86)	30 (86)	30 (86)	29 (84)	28 (82)	27 (81)	29 (85)
Mean daily minimum °C (°F)	20 (68)	20 (68)	21 (70)	23 (73)	25 (77)	25 (77)	25 (77)	25 (77)	24 (75)	23 (73)	22 (72)	21 (70)	23 (73)
Average precipitation mm (inches)	38 (1.5)	37 (1.5)	37 (1.5)	49 (1.9)	181 (7.1)	214 (8.4)	264 (10.4)	251 (9.9)	243 (9.6)	229 (9.0)	129 (5.1)	96 (3.8)	1,768 (69.7)
Average rainy days	11.6	10.7	12.4	15.2	22.6	25.0	26.1	24.9	24.3	19.2	16.4	15.4	223.8
Source: Meteoblue

== Demographics ==
Population census of Batac

Year	Pop.	±% p.a.
1903	19,254	—
1918	23,986	+1.48%
1939	22,207	−0.37%
1948	22,587	+0.19%
1960	27,139	+1.54%
1970	33,114	+2.01%
1975	35,230	+1.25%
1980	37,579	+1.30%

Year	Pop.	±% p.a.
1990	43,092	+1.38%
1995	45,534	+1.04%
2000	47,682	+0.99%
2007	50,675	+0.84%
2010	53,542	+2.02%
2015	55,201	+0.58%
2020	55,484	+0.11%
2024	56,781	+0.56%

Source: Philippine Statistics Authority

In the 2024 census, the population of Batac was 56,781 people, with a density of 350 inhabitants per square kilometre or 910 inhabitants per square mile.

=== Language ===
The primary language spoken in Batac is Ilocano. Tagalog is also spoken in the city.

== Economy ==
Poverty incidence of Batac (%)

Source: Philippine Statistics Authority

The Batac City Public Market touted as one of the biggest in the region offers a wide array of goods – freshly picked local vegetables and fruits, handicrafts, tincrafts, pottery, native delicacies, chicharon, longganisa, wet market treats and many others. The Delicia Center, located adjacent to the City Public Market, contains RTW shops, banks, appliance stores, farm supplies, pharmacies, groceries, a lottery outlet and many more. The Delicia Center and the City Public Market form part of the commercial district of Batac City.

With Central Bank of the Philippines Cash Unit in the Batac City Government Center, other financial institutions including Philippine National Bank, RCBC, Metrobank, Land Bank, BPI, Bank of Commerce, BDO and other local banks followed.

The Plaza Maestro Complex, one of the modern shopping centers in the province, offers two of the country's top fast food chains (Jollibee and Chowking), several boutique shops, a drugstore and a photo shop, among others. A stone's throw away from the commercial complex are bakeshops and a local pizza house.

== Tourism ==
The President Ferdinand E. Marcos Monument at the Batac Mini Park

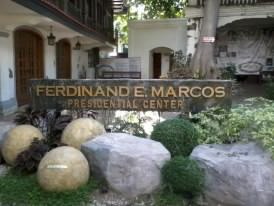
Marcos Museum and Mausoleum

The Marcos Museum and Mausoleum is situated in the city center. The Mausoleum is where the glass-entombed, preserved corpse of Former President Ferdinand E. Marcos was once found. His body was moved November 18, 2016 to Libingan ng mga Bayani (Cemetery of [the] Heroes) Fort Andres Bonifacio, Taguig, Metro Manila, Philippines. . The Museum holds the memorabilia of then President, from his stint in the Armed Forces down to his presidency. Other notable figures who hails from Batac include Gen. Artemio Ricarte, the Father of the Philippine Army and Msgr. Gregorio Aglipay, the co-founder of the Philippine Independent Church. Monuments and shrines of these personalities had been erected and named after them, such as the Gregorio Aglipay National Shrine.

The Batac Riverside Empanadaan is a retail and dining center catering to tourist selling food products including the city's primary commodity of Batac, the empanada, and other souvenirs and products.

The city has two festivals, The Farmers Festival and The Empanada Festival. The Farmers' Festival, conducted in the first week of May each year is a celebration of bountiful harvest and a tribute to the farmers of the city. It is participated by the rural barangays of the city. The Empanada Festival is a festivity held formerly on the month of June in celebration of the city's Charter Day. Then, the Empanada Festival date was changed to December starting in 2007 to become part of the month long founding anniversary of the city. The main feature of the festival is the street dancing which chronicles the process of preparing the empanada.

The Batac City Fiesta, a month-long festivity commencing on December 8, is the longest fiesta in the Province of Ilocos Norte. The fiesta is celebrated in honor of the city's patroness, Our Lady of the Immaculate Conception. The Electric and Lights Parade marks the beginning of the City Fiesta every December 8.

== Government ==
=== Local government ===
Batac, belonging to the second congressional district of the province of Ilocos Norte, is governed by a mayor designated as its local chief executive and by a city council as its legislative body in accordance with the Local Government Code. The mayor, vice mayor, and the councilors are elected directly by the people through an election which is being held every three years.

=== Elected officials ===
Members of the City Council (2025–2028)
Position	Name
Congressman	Eugenio Angelo M. Barba
Mayor	Mark Christian R. Chua
Vice-Mayor	Albert D. Chua
Sangguniang Panlungsod Member	Kichel Jomarie G. Pungtilan
Sangguniang Panlungsod Member	Eleuterio A. Salamangkit, Jr.
Sangguniang Panlungsod Member	Martha Louise Aurora M. Borleo
Sangguniang Panlungsod Member	Gwyneth S. Quidang
Sangguniang Panlungsod Member	John Gabrielle Dominique M. Daguio
Sangguniang Panlungsod Member	Lucky Rene G. Bunye
Sangguniang Panlungsod Member	Violeta Eugenia D. Nalupta
Sangguniang Panlungsod Member	MacArthur A. Aguinaldo
Sangguniang Panlungsod Member	Rizal P. Castillo
Sangguniang Panlungsod Member	Juan Paulo P. Flojo
Sangguniang Panlungsod Member	Gilbert O. Medina (ABC President)
Sangguniang Panlungsod Member	Reign Gwendia T. Mirasol (SK President)

=== List of Local Chief Executives ===
- 1900: Sereno Franco
- 1904: Claudio Asuncion
- 1906: Sereno Franco
- 1910: Santiago Espiritu
- 1912: Galo Luzod
- 1916: Higidio Layaoen
- 1917: Mauricio Sabas
- 1919: Higidio Layaoen
- 1922: Isidro Morales
- 1925: Eugenio Mendoza
- 1928: Urbano Arcangel
- 1931: Eugenio Mendoza, Sr.
- 1934: Leon Verano
- 1941: Catalino Acosta
- 1942: Sereno Franco (Japanese Occupation)
- 1942: Catalino Acosta (Liberation)
- 1945: Vicente Castro (Military Government)
- 1946-1952: Mariano Nalupta, Sr.
- 1956-1977: Feliciano Q. Asuncion
- 1977-1987: Fe P. Acosta - Aguinaldo
- 1986-1987: Bonifacio G. Agdigos (OIC)
- 1987-1988: Pastor N. Nalupta
- 1988-1998: Jesus R. Nalupta, Sr.
- 1998-2001: Elena M. Nalupta
- 2001-2007: Jesus R. Nalupta, Sr.
- 2007–2016: Jeffrey Jubal C. Nalupta
- 2016–2025: Albert D. Chua
- 2025-Present: Mark Christian R. Chua

=== Punong Barangays (2023–2028) ===
- Brgy. 1-N Ricarte: Cheskanadia C. Cali
- Brgy. 1-S Valdez: Gilbert O. Medina (ABC President)
- Brgy. 2 Ablan: John F. Daguio
- Brgy. 3 Cangrunaan: Ian Carlo G. Rivera
- Brgy. 4 Nalupta: Eliseo N. Fernandez, Jr.
- Brgy. 5 Cal-laguip: Ligaya C. Sabulao
- Brgy. 6 San Julian: Esteban D. Santos
- Brgy. 7 Caunayan: Emelie B. Salvador
- Brgy. 8 Acosta: Walter Fontanilla
- Brgy. 9 Aglipay: Jeff Laurence T. Franco
- Brgy. 10-N Lacub: Ronald Emmanuel A. Arzadon
- Brgy. 10-S Barani: Mell P. Clemente
- Brgy. 11 Ben-Agan: Salvador S. Paragas, Jr.
- Brgy. 12 Palpalicong: Ivy Joy P. Quintos
- Brgy. 13 Baay: Romeo T. Bagaoisan
- Brgy. 14 Bungon: Emmanuel P. Bayangos
- Brgy. 15 Baligat: Ronald L. Castro
- Brgy. 16-N Quiling Norte: Joenel S. Cuanang
- Brgy. 16-S Quiling Sur: Imelda S. Dela Cruz
- Brgy. 17 Tabug: Arnold G. Alibuyog
- Brgy. 18 Magnuang: Felix H. Valencia, Jr.
- Brgy. 19 Pimentel: Teodorico G. Casauran
- Brgy. 20-N Colo: Gerardo Jerry Mario N. Gaoat
- Brgy. 20-S Mabaleng: Jonathan E. Laud
- Brgy. 21 Quiom: Chester P. Daga
- Brgy. 22 Maipalig: Ruth Ann A. Umadac
- Brgy. 23 Biningan: Christopher A. Banay
- Brgy. 24 Sumader: Crispin A. Putulan
- Brgy. 25-N Camguidan: Romiefel C. Gabay
- Brgy. 25-S Payao: Angel F. Palapal
- Brgy. 26 Parangopong: Lorenzo D. Battulayan
- Brgy. 27-W Naguirangan: Joseph P. Ulit
- Brgy. 27-E Capacuan: Randy P. Agunat
- Brgy. 28 San Mateo: Richard B. Sagsagat
- Brgy. 29 San Pedro: Edward C. Sanguir
- Brgy. 30-W Baoa West: Salvador Y. Caroy
- Brgy. 30-E Baoa East: Maricel R. Corpuz
- Brgy. 31 Camandingan: Noli V. Lacambra
- Brgy. 32 Palongpong: Reynaldo S. Garcia
- Brgy. 33-N Nagbacalan: Mario R. Bagaoisan
- Brgy. 33-S Rayuray: Norberto O. Puyot
- Brgy. 34 Dariwdiw: Federico A. Ventura
- Brgy. 35 Bil-loca: Emily R. Canja

== Education ==
The Batac City Schools Division Office governs all public and private education within the municipality. It has two schools district offices which manage the operations of public and private elementary and high schools. These are Batac I Schools District Office, and Batac II Schools District Office.

=== Primary and elementary schools ===
- Baay Elementary School
- Baligat Elementary School
- Baoa East Elementary School
- Baoa Elementary School
- Batac Puericulture & Family Planning Center Preparatory School
- Benigno Macadaeg Memorial Elementary School
- Bil-loca Elementary School
- Biningan Elementary School
- Camandingan Elementary School
- Catalino Acosta Memorial Elementary School Special Education Center
- Colo-Mabaleng Elementary School
- Dariwdiw Elementary School
- Cumcumraas-Manggaddi-Pitpitac Elementary School
- Graceland Saviour's Institution (Elementary)
- Hilario Valdez Memorial Elementary School
- Living Rock Christian School of Excellence
- Mariano Marcos Memorial Elementary School
- Magnuang Elementary School
- Maipalig-Quiom Elementary School
- Nagbacalan Elementary School
- Naguirangan-Capacuan Elementary School
- P.Q. Pimentel Elementary School
- Parangopong Elementary School
- Payao Elementary School
- Rayuray Elementary School
- Quiling Elementary School
- San Mateo Elementary School
- Sumader Elementary School
- Tabug Elementary School

=== Secondary schools ===
Batac National High School (BNHS) is the most popular high school in the city. It has three campuses: Poblacion, Bungon and Payao. The city has one Catholic School, The Immaculate Conception Academy. It was named after Immaculate Conception, the patron saint of the city. It is under the Missionary Sisters Servants of the Holy Spirit (SSpS). It was founded in 1963. It is located beside the Immaculate Conception Parish.

- Batac Institute
- Batac National High School
- Crispina Marcos Valdez NHS
- City of Batac National High School Payao
- City of Batac National High School Poblacion
- City of Batac National High School Rayuray
- Eureka High School
- Gen. Artemio Ricarte Senior High School
- Graceland Saviour's Institution
- Ferdinand E. Marcos Senior High School
- Immaculate Concepcion Academy
- Maranatha Christian Academy

=== Higher educational institution ===
The Mariano Marcos State University (MMSU) is a comprehensive institution of higher learning in the Ilocos Region. MMSU's root anchored deep, its foundation is strong, and its beginnings all proven historical turning points as far back as the early 1900s.

- Batac Junior College
- Mariano Marcos State University

== Notable people ==
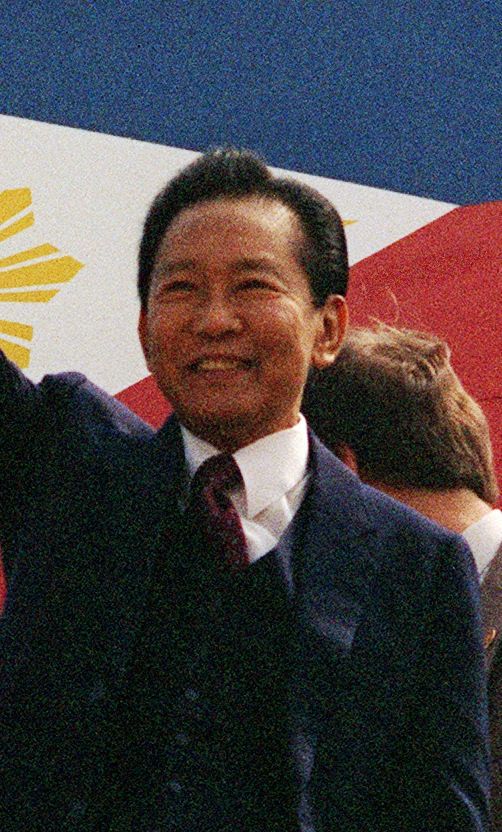
Ferdinand Marcos - 10th President of the Philippines

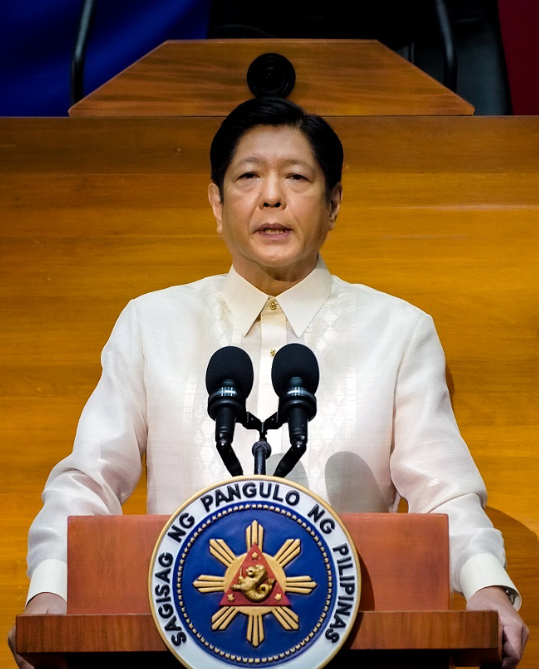
Ferdinand R. Marcos, Jr. – 17th and incumbent President of the Philippines

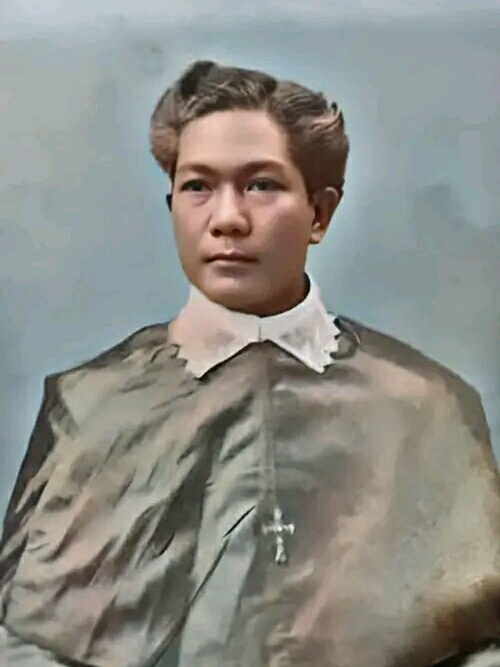
Gregorio Aglipay – Co-founder and the First Supreme Bishop of the Philippine Independent Church.

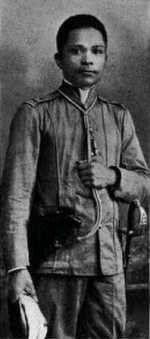
Artemio Ricarte – A Filipino general during the Philippine Revolution and the Philippine–American War. Considered the "Father of the Philippine Army".

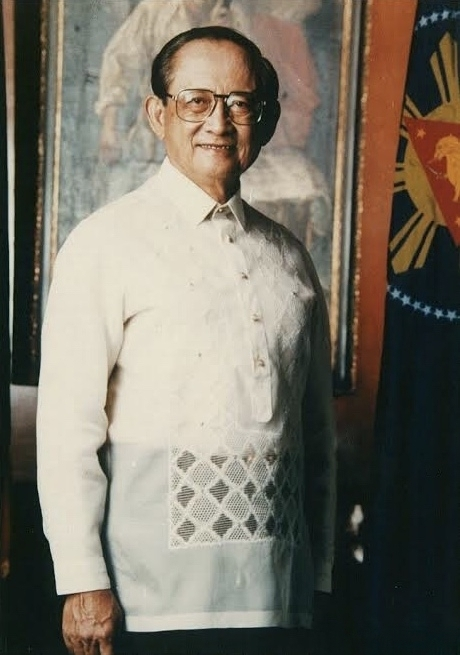
Fidel V. Ramos - 12th President of the Philippines. He traced his roots through his mother, a member of the Valdez clan of Batac.

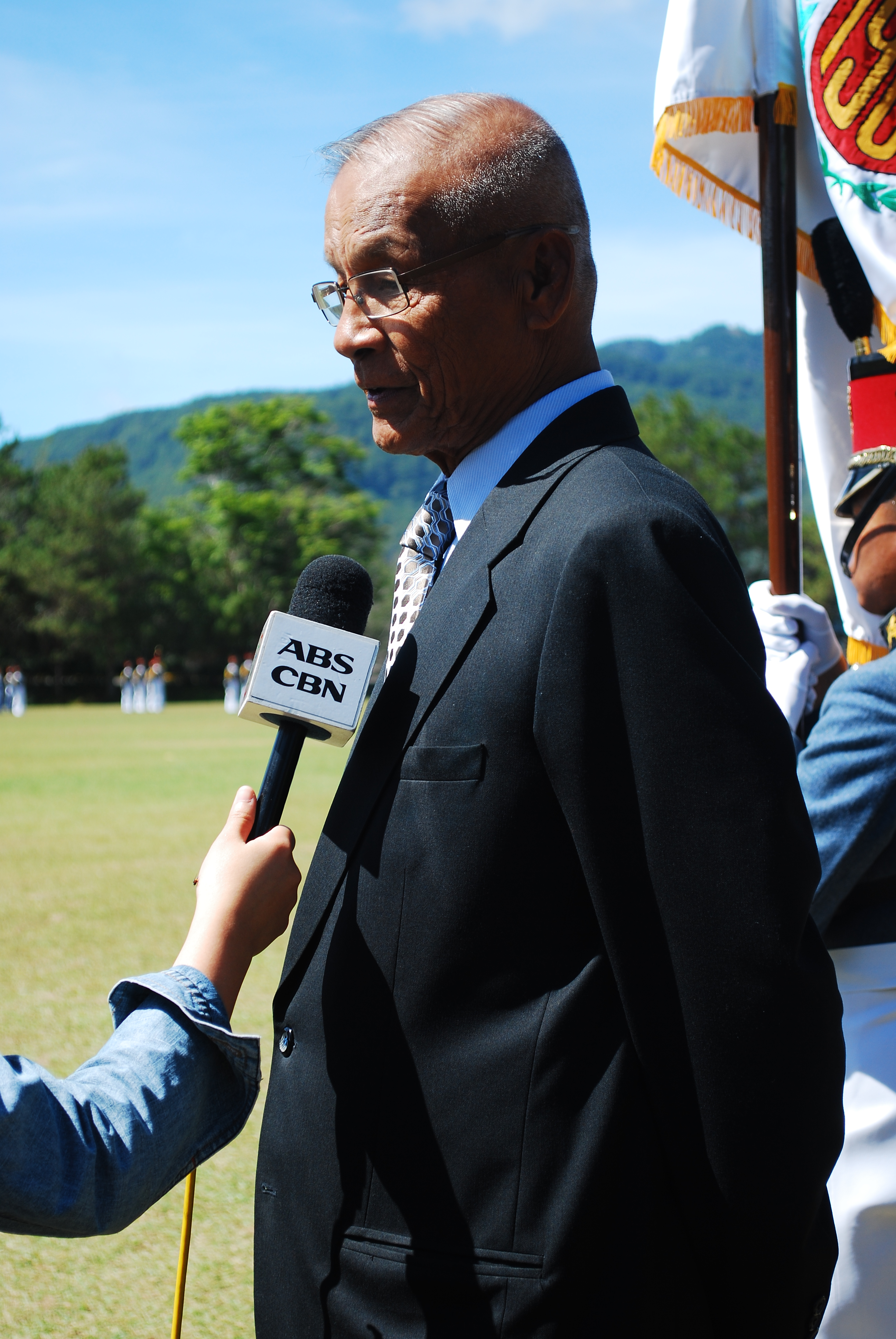
Rodolfo Biazon – Senator of the Philippines from June 30, 1992, up to June 30, 1995, and from June 30, 1998, up to June 30, 2010.

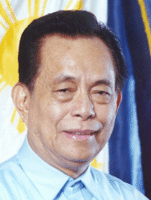
Aquilino "Nene" Pimentel, Jr. - Senator of the Philippines (1987 - 1992, 1998 - 2010). He traced his roots in the city through his mother who came from Batac, then a town at that time.
