= Dingras =

Municipality in Ilocos Norte, Philippines

- Municipality
- Municipality of Dingras
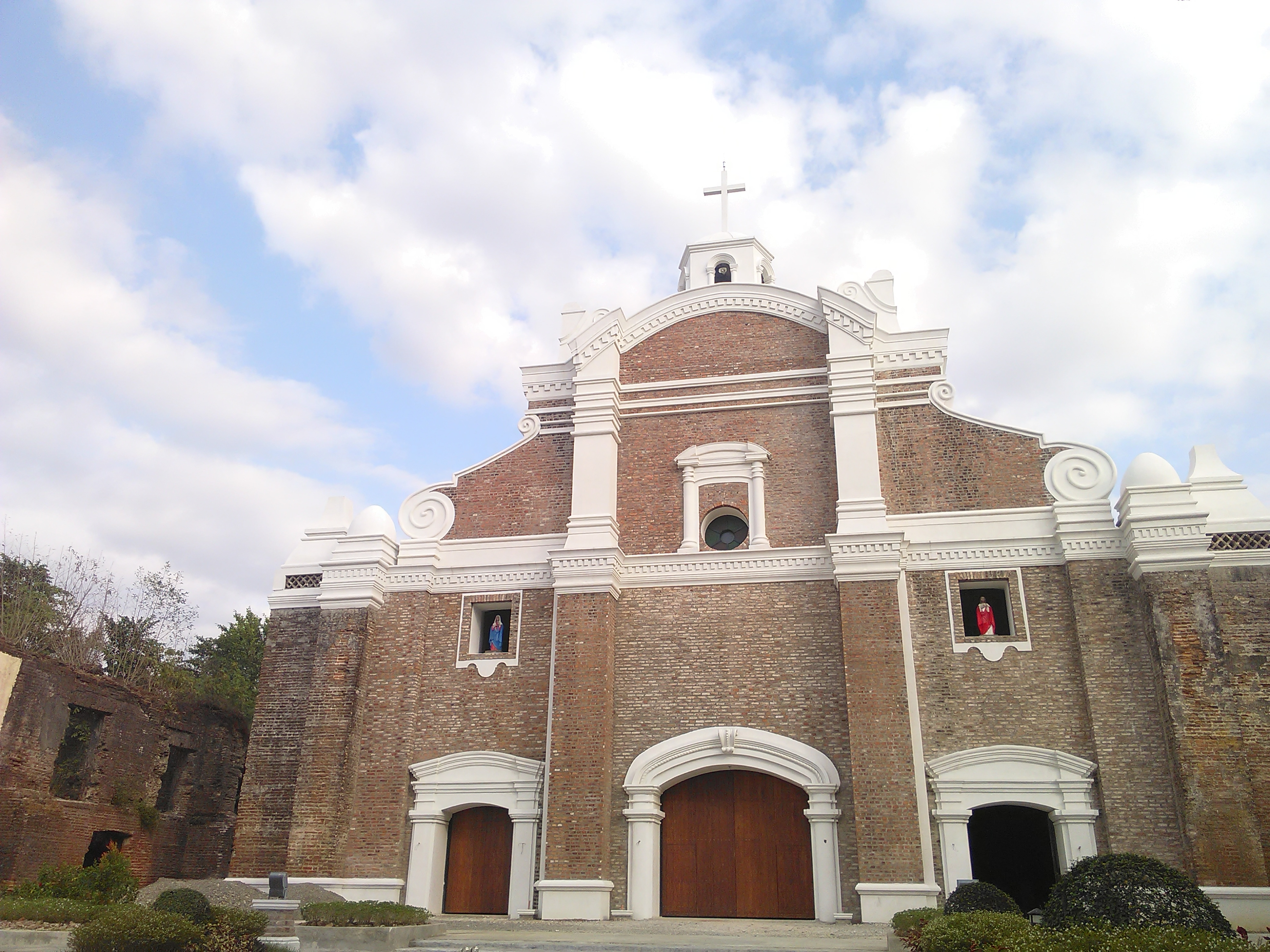
- Dingras Church

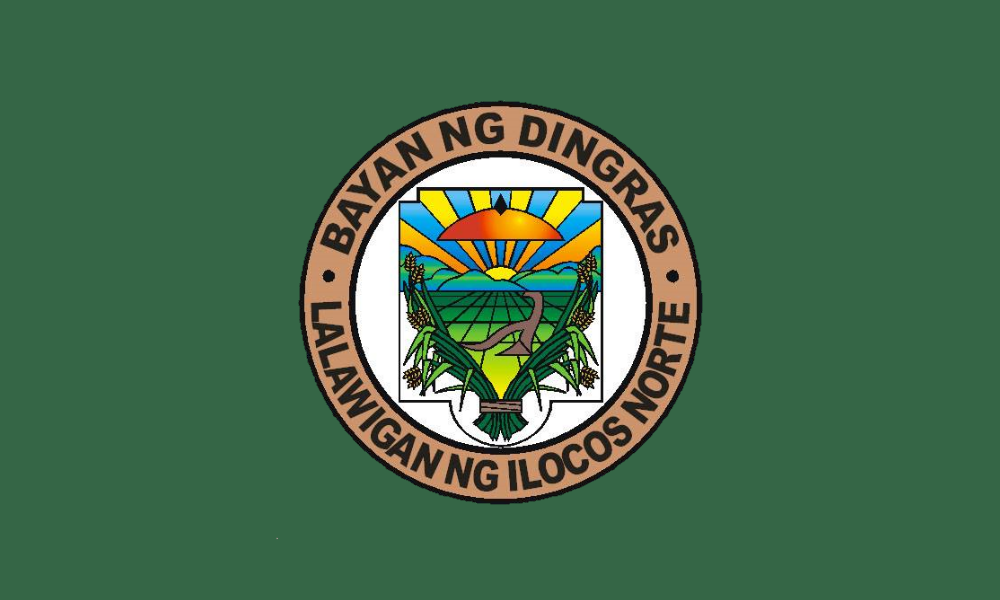
- Flag Seal

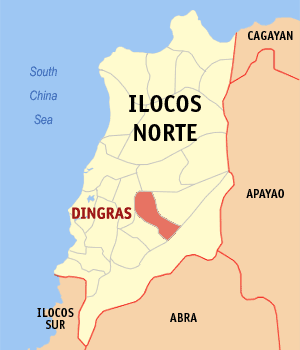
- Map of Ilocos Norte with Dingras highlighted
- Interactive map of Dingras
- Location within the Philippines
- Coordinates: 18°06′13″N 120°41′51″E
- Country: Philippines
- Region: Ilocos Region
- Province: Ilocos Norte
- District: 2nd district
- Founded: July 8, 1598
- Barangays: 31 (see Barangays)

Government
  - Type: Sangguniang Bayan
  - Mayor: Joefrey P. Saguid
  - Vice Mayor: Erdio E. Valenzuela
  - Representative: Eugenio Angelo M. Barba
  - Municipal Council: Members: Ruben Felicito C. Marcos; Lester S. Ballesteros; Elsie P. Garces; Nathaniel Ruben P. Taylan; Charles L. Tadena; Rowena Celerina P. Verzosa; Jimmy T. Aguinaldo; Dammielle Ashley Manna
  - Electorate: 26,583 voters (2025)

Area
  - Total: 96.00 km^{2} (37.07 sq mi)
- Elevation: 41 m (135 ft)
- Highest elevation: 268 m (879 ft)
- Lowest elevation: 14 m (46 ft)

Population (2024 census)
  - Total: 40,176
  - Density: 418.5/km^{2} (1,084/sq mi)
  - Households: 9,927

Economy
  - Income class: 1st municipal income class
  - Poverty incidence: 5.08% (2023)
  - Revenue: ₱ 394.1 million (2024)
  - Assets: ₱ 1,296 million (2024)
  - Expenditure: ₱ 233.4 million (2024)
  - Liabilities: ₱ 314 million (2024)

Service provider
  - Electricity: Ilocos Norte Electric Cooperative (INEC)
- Time zone: UTC+8 (PST)
- ZIP code: 2913
- PSGC: 0102809000
- IDD : area code: +63 (0)77
- Native languages: Ilocano; Tagalog
- Website: dingras.gov.ph

Dingras, officially the Municipality of Dingras (Ilocano: Ili ti Dingras; Filipino: Bayan ng Dingras), is a municipality in the province of Ilocos Norte, Philippines. According to the 2024 census, it has a population of 40,176 people.

== Etymology ==
The municipality is said to have been named after a romantic folk legend.

The Legend of Dingras

Legend has it that in the early times, there were two prosperous Barangay in the present site of the town, each ruled by a powerful chief or datu. They were bitter and mortal enemies. Naslag was the powerful chief of the barangay north of the river, while Allawigan was the chief of the barangay to the south of the river.

One day, Allawigan and his warriors went out to go hunting. Ras, his son, was the bravest among them. During the hunt, Ras followed a deer that went north across the river. As he was chasing the deer, he saw a beautiful damsel gathering wildflowers on the opposite side of the riverbank. She was Ding, the daughter of Naslag. To help the lady, Ras gathered the most beautiful flowers near him, attached them to an arrowhead, and shot it over the river to land by the lady's feet. Ding looked at the other side of the river and waved her hands. Ras went home happily.

Ras begged his father for permission to win Ding for his wife; but because the fathers of Ding and Ras were bitter enemies, the only way he could win her was in an open battle fought fiercely between the two tribes.

Ras led his father's warriors. They fought valiantly and came out victorious in the end. Ras asked for Ding's hand as a prize, but Naslag refused. This angered him and hurled a challenge to the bravest warrior of Naslag in single combat with Ding as prize. The challenge was accepted. The combat was fought and again, Ras was victorious. He brought Ding triumphantly to Allawigan, his father. Thereafter, the people named the two barangays Dingras, after Ras, their valiant warrior ruler, and Ding, his wife.

== History ==
On January 27, 2000, Mayor Robert Castro was forcibly removed from his office by the police due to defying orders from the regional trial court issued nine days prior to step down after losing an electoral contest to Oswaldo Parado, who was found to have won the 1998 mayoral race by over 370 votes.

Through Presidential Proclamation 680, September 20, 2024 was declared a special non-working day as tribute to Josefa Llanes Escoda, a World War II heroine and the Girl Scouts of the Philippines founder.

== Geography ==
The Municipality of Dingras has a total area of 17,962 hectares, ranking 8th in size among the 23 municipalities and cities in the province. It accounts for practically 5.2% of the total land area of Ilocos Norte and corresponding percentage to the municipal area composed of 31 barangays. Six are on the Poblacion and 25 in the rural area.

Dingras is situated 18.07 kilometres (11.23 mi) from the provincial capital Laoag, and 487.99 kilometres (303.22 mi) from the country's capital city of Manila.

=== Barangays ===
Dingras is politically subdivided into 31 barangays. Each barangay consists of puroks and some have sitios.

- Albano (Poblacion)
- Bacsil
- Bagut
- Baresbes
- Barong
- Bungcag
- Cali
- Capasan
- Dancel (Poblacion)
- Elizabeth
- Espiritu (Gabon)
- Foz
- Guerrero (Poblacion)
- Lanas
- Lumbad
- Madamba (Poblacion)
- Mandaloque
- Medina
- Parado (Bangay)
- Peralta (Poblacion)
- Puruganan (Poblacion)
- Root
- Sagpatan
- Saludares (Baldias)
- San Esteban
- San Francisco
- San Marcelino (Padong)
- San Marcos
- Sulquiano (Sidiran)
- Suyo
- Ver (Naglayaan)

=== Climate ===
Climate data for Dingras, Ilocos Norte
Month	Jan	Feb	Mar	Apr	May	Jun	Jul	Aug	Sep	Oct	Nov	Dec	Year
Mean daily maximum °C (°F)	27 (81)	28 (82)	30 (86)	32 (90)	31 (88)	31 (88)	30 (86)	30 (86)	30 (86)	29 (84)	29 (84)	27 (81)	30 (85)
Mean daily minimum °C (°F)	20 (68)	20 (68)	21 (70)	23 (73)	25 (77)	25 (77)	25 (77)	25 (77)	24 (75)	23 (73)	22 (72)	21 (70)	23 (73)
Average precipitation mm (inches)	38 (1.5)	37 (1.5)	37 (1.5)	49 (1.9)	181 (7.1)	214 (8.4)	264 (10.4)	251 (9.9)	243 (9.6)	229 (9.0)	129 (5.1)	96 (3.8)	1,768 (69.7)
Average rainy days	11.6	10.7	12.4	15.2	22.6	25.0	26.1	24.9	24.3	19.2	16.4	15.4	223.8
Source: Meteoblue

== Demographics ==
Population census of Dingras

Year	Pop.	±% p.a.
1903	15,792	—
1918	21,388	+2.04%
1939	22,434	+0.23%
1948	24,481	+0.97%
1960	28,308	+1.22%
1970	22,751	−2.16%
1975	25,530	+2.34%
1980	26,511	+0.76%

Year	Pop.	±% p.a.
1990	30,519	+1.42%
1995	31,485	+0.59%
2000	33,310	+1.22%
2007	35,793	+1.00%
2010	37,021	+1.24%
2015	38,562	+0.78%
2020	40,127	+0.84%
2024	40,176	+0.03%

Source: Philippine Statistics Authority

In the 2024 census, the population of Dingras was 40,176 people, with a density of 420 inhabitants per square kilometre or 1,100 inhabitants per square mile.

== Economy ==
Poverty incidence of Dingras (%)

Source: Philippine Statistics Authority

Out of the total area 6,305 hectares is devoted to rice and corn production. Dingras is known as one of the rice-producing municipalities in Ilocos Norte. Other non-productive areas are devoted to livestock production, swine production and other livelihood projects. Most of the population are engaged in farming as the primary source of income.

== Longest Bibingka ==
On October 9, 2007, Dingras, Ilocos Norte, Philippines sought a Guinness World Record certification after baking a kilometer-long "cassava bibingka" (native cake) made from 1,000 kilos of cassava and eaten by 1,000 residents.

== List of Cultural Properties of Dingras ==
Cultural Property wmph identifier (Note: wmph is an internal identifier used by Wikimedia Philippines to identify the monument. This is not an official identifier, and only shown temporarily in the templates until the government creates an updated complete list.)	Site name	Description	Province	City or municipality	Address	Coordinates	Image
	Versoza House Ruins	Destroyed by earthquake	Ilocos Norte	Dingras	Padawin Street, Barangay Madamba, Poblacion,	18°06′09″N 120°41′51″E	Upload file
	Silvino Madamba House		Ilocos Norte	Dingras	Barangay Madamba	18°06′10″N 120°41′50″E	Upload file
	Taylan House		Ilocos Norte	Dingras	Barangay Madamba	18°06′07″N 120°41′54″E	Upload file
	Albano House		Ilocos Norte	Dingras	Barangay Madamba	18°06′06″N 120°41′55″E	Upload file
	St. Joseph Educational Center of Dingras	Built in the 1940s-1950s; formerly the parish church of Dingras	Ilocos Norte	Dingras	Barangay Madamba	18°06′08″N 120°41′56″E	Upload file
	St. Joseph Parish Church of Dingras		Ilocos Norte	Dingras	Poblacion, Barangay Madamba	18°06′11″N 120°41′55″E	Upload file
	Boy Scouts Monument		Ilocos Norte	Dingras	Poblacion, Barangay Madamba	18°06′09″N 120°41′54″E	Upload file
	St. Joseph Institute of Dingras Building		Ilocos Norte	Dingras	Poblacion, Barangay Madamba	18°06′12″N 120°41′54″E	Upload file
	Unknown House		Ilocos Norte	Dingras	Rang-ay, Barangay Madamba	18°06′14″N 120°41′50″E	Upload file
	Puruganan Ancestral House	Currently used as Community Rural Bank of Dingras, with NHCP historical marker	Ilocos Norte	Dingras	Barangay Madamba	18°06′15″N 120°41′51″E	Upload file
	Josefa Llanes Escoda Monument	House where Josefa Llanes Escoda was born.	Ilocos Norte	Dingras	Dona Josefa Llanes Escoda National Highway, Barangay Madamba	18°06′15″N 120°41′52″E	Upload file
	Dingras Cemetery		Ilocos Norte	Dingras	Dona Josefa Llanes Escoda National Highway, Barangay Madamba	18°06′53″N 120°41′32″E	Upload file
	Tabacalera de Dingras		Ilocos Norte	Dingras	Dona Josefa Llanes Escoda National Highway, Barangay Madamba	18°06′50″N 120°41′31″E	Upload file

== Government ==
=== Local government ===
Dingras, belonging to the second congressional district of the province of Ilocos Norte, is governed by a mayor designated as its local chief executive and by a municipal council as its legislative body in accordance with the Local Government Code. The mayor, vice mayor, and the councilors are elected directly by the people through an election which is being held every three years.

=== Elected officials ===
Members of the Municipal Council (2025–2028)
Position	Name
Congressman	Eugenio Angelo M. Barba
Mayor	Joemell Ernesti S. Go Sy
Vice-Mayor	Erdio E. Valenzuela
Councilors	Melanio J. Parado III
Councilors	Ruben Felicito C. Marcos
Councilors	Reina J. Balutan
Councilors	Marc Lester K. Ballesteros
Councilors	Elmer B. Tolentino
Councilors	Enrico Pacifico B. Ruiz
Councilors	Joey S. Apostol
Councilors	Janeo Ross E. Sanchez

== Education ==
There are two schools district offices which govern all public and private schools within the municipality. These are Dingras I Schools District, and Dingras II Schools District.

=== Primary and elementary schools ===
- Bacsil Elementary School
- Bagut Elementary School
- Baresbes Elementary School
- Barong Elementary School
- Capasan Elementary School
- Dingras Central Elementary School
- Dingras West Central Elementary School
- Elizabeth Elementary School
- Elizabeth-Lanas Elementary School
- Espiritu Elementary School
- Francisco Elementary School
- Hilaria Salvatierra Mem. Elementary School
- Mabino Elementary School
- Mandaloque Elementary School
- Medina Parado Elementary School
- Peralta Elementary School
- Sagpatan Elementary School
- Saludares-Cali Elementary School
- San Esteban Elementary School
- San Marcelino Elementary School
- San Marcos Elementary School
- Sulquiano Elementary School
- Suyo Elementary School
- Ver Elementary School

=== Secondary schools ===
- Dingras National High School/Lt. Edgar Foz Mem. National High School (Main)
- Dingras National High School/Lt. Edgar Foz Mem. National High School (Barong Campus)
- Dingras National High School/Lt. Edgar Foz Mem. National High School (San Marcos Campus)
- Dingras National High School/Lt. Edgar Foz Mem. National High School (Sulquiano Campus)
- San Marcelino National High School
- St. Joseph Institute of Dingras
- Suyo National High School

== Bibliography ==
- Dela Torre, Visitacion (2006). The Ilocos Heritage. Makati: Tower Book House. ISBN 978-971-91030-9-7.
