= Angelo Barba =

Filipino politician (born 1958)

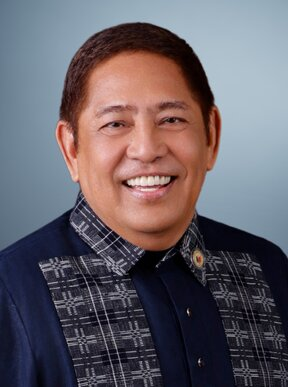
- Official portrait, 2025

Member of the House of Representatives from Ilocos Norte’s 2nd district
- Incumbent
- Assumed office June 30, 2019
- Preceded by: Imelda Marcos

Vice Governor of Ilocos Norte
- In office June 30, 2010 – June 30, 2019
- Governor: Imee Marcos
- Preceded by: Windell D. Chua
- Succeeded by: Cecilia Araneta-Marcos

Member of the Ilocos Norte Provincial Board from the Ilocos Norte's 2nd district
- In office June 30, 2001 – June 30, 2010

Mayor of San Nicolas, Ilocos Norte
- In office June 30, 1992 – June 30, 2001

Personal details
- Born: Eugenio Angelo Marcos Barba; December 13, 1958 (age 67) Paco, Manila, Philippines
- Party: Nacionalista (since 2012)
- Other political affiliations: Lakas (2009–2012); KBL (1992–2009)
- Spouse: Myra Shiela Nalupta
- Relatives: Marcos family
- Occupation: Politician

Eugenio Angelo Marcos Barba (born December 13, 1958) is a Filipino politician. He is currently serving as representative of the 2nd district of Ilocos Norte since 2019. He was served as vice governor of Ilocos Norte from 2010 to 2019. He is the nephew of former President Ferdinand Marcos and first cousin of current President Bongbong Marcos.

== Early life ==
Barba was born on December 13, 1958, in Paco, Manila to Marcelino Bonoan Barba and Fortuna Edralin Marcos, the youngest sister of then-representative Ferdinand Marcos.

== Political career ==
=== Mayor of San Nicolas, Ilocos Norte (1992–2001) ===
Barba was elected as mayor of San Nicolas, Ilocos Norte from 1992 to 2001.

=== Ilocos Norte Provincial Board (2001–2010) ===
In 2001, Barba became a member of the Ilocos Norte Provincial Board representing the second district until 2010.

=== Vice Governor of Ilocos Norte (2010–2019) ===
Barba served as vice governor of Ilocos Norte from 2010 to 2019 for three consecutive terms.

=== House of Representatives (2019–present) ===
Barba is represented the second district of Ilocos Norte in 2019.

== Personal life ==
Barba is married to Myra Shiela Nalupta, the daughter of Mariano Nalupta Jr., a former representative and vice governor from Ilocos Norte.
