= List of mayors in Ilocos Norte =

== Municipal Mayors of Ilocos Norte ==
Ilocos Norte comprises 21 municipalities and 2 component cities, further subdivided into 557 barangays. There are two legislative districts in the province.

- † Provincial capital and component city
- ∗ Component city
- Municipality

City or municipality		District	Municipal/City Mayor	Brgy.	Coordinates^{[A]}
Adams		1st	Homer Domingo	1	18°27′41″N 120°54′13″E
Bacarra		1st	Nicomedes Dela Cruz	43	18°15′10″N 120°36′42″E
Badoc		2nd	Virgilio M. Calajate	31	17°55′36″N 120°28′26″E
Bangui		1st	Denton Lawrence Garvida	14	18°32′12″N 120°45′57″E
Banna		2nd	Mary Chrislyn Abadilla	20	17°58′48″N 120°39′18″E
Batac	∗	2nd	Mark Christian R. Chua	43	18°03′24″N 120°33′50″E
Burgos		1st	Crescente Garcia	11	18°30′40″N 120°38′37″E
Carasi		1st	Robella Gaspar	3	18°08′27″N 120°49′17″E
Currimao		2nd	Edward T. Quilala	23	18°01′10″N 120°29′12″E
Dingras		2nd	Joemelle Saguid Go-Sy	31	18°06′09″N 120°42′05″E
Dumalneg		1st	Francisco Espiritu, Jr.	2	18°31′19″N 120°48′35″E
Laoag	†	1st	James Bryan Alcid	80	18°11′50″N 120°35′37″E
Marcos		2nd	Antonio Mariano	13	18°02′38″N 120°40′38″E
Nueva Era		2nd	Aldrin Garvida	11	17°54′55″N 120°39′58″E
Pagudpud		1st	Rafael Ralph L. Benemerito II	16	18°33′36″N 120°47′19″E
Paoay		2nd	Shiella A. Galano	31	18°03′42″N 120°31′10″E
Pasuquin		1st	Robert Aguinaldo	33	18°20′02″N 120°37′10″E
Piddig		1st	Georgina S. Guillen	23	18°09′49″N 120°42′59″E
Pinili		2nd	Rommel T. Labasan	25	17°57′07″N 120°31′33″E
San Nicolas		2nd	Ed Mar Vincent Bonoan	24	18°10′30″N 120°35′39″E
Sarrat		1st	Ralph Conrad Medrano	24	18°09′24″N 120°38′48″E
Solsona		2nd	Joseph De Lara	22	18°05′43″N 120°46′24″E
Vintar		1st	Richard Degala	33	18°13′47″N 120°38′57″E
Total				557	
1. Coordinates mark the city/town center, and are sortable by latitude.
