= Ilocos Norte's at-large congressional district =

Historical electoral district in the Philippines

- Former constituency for the Malolos Congress, National Assembly of the Philippines and Batasang Pambansa
- Province: Ilocos Norte
- Region: Ilocos Region (1984–1986)

Former constituency
- Created: 1898 (first creation); 1943 (second creation); 1984 (third creation)
- Abolished: 1907 (first abolition); 1945 (second abolition); 1986 (third abolition)

Ilocos Norte's at-large congressional district is an obsolete electoral district that was used for electing members of Philippine national legislatures in Ilocos Norte before 1987.

Ilocos Norte first elected its representatives at-large during the 1898 Philippine legislative election for six seats in the Malolos Congress, the National Assembly of the First Philippine Republic. Following the installation of U.S. civil government in 1901 and the reorganization of provinces for the Philippine Assembly, Ilocos Norte was divided into a first and second district. The provincewide district was re-created ahead of the 1943 Philippine legislative election for a seat in the National Assembly of the Second Philippine Republic, with an additional seat assigned to its provincial governor. The district became inactive again following the restoration of the House of Representatives in 1945 when Ilocos Norte returned to electing its representatives from its two districts. In the unicameral Batasang Pambansa that replaced the House in 1978, Ilocos Norte was included in the multi-member regional electoral district of Region I (Ilocos Region) for its interim parliament. The district was again utilized in the 1984 Philippine parliamentary election when Ilocos Norte was granted two seats in the regular parliament.

After 1986, Ilocos Norte elected its representatives from its two single-member congressional districts restored under a new constitution.

== List of members representing the district ==
=== Malolos Congress (1898–1901) ===
Seat A					Seat B					Seat C					Seat D					Seat E					Seat F					Legislature	Constituency
Portrait	Member (Lifespan)	Term of office	Party	Electoral history	Portrait	Member (Lifespan)	Term of office	Party	Electoral history	Portrait	Member (Lifespan)	Term of office	Party	Electoral history	Portrait	Member (Lifespan)	Term of office	Party	Electoral history	Portrait	Member (Lifespan)	Term of office	Party	Electoral history	Portrait	Member (Lifespan)	Term of office	Party	Electoral history	Legislature	Constituency
District created June 18, 1898.
	Gregorio Aglipay (1860–1940)	September 15, 1898 – March 23, 1901	Nonpartisan	Elected in 1898.		Primitivo Donato	September 15, 1898 – March 23, 1901	Nonpartisan	Elected in 1898.		Martin Garcia	September 15, 1898 – March 23, 1901	Nonpartisan	Elected in 1898.		Jose Luna (1861–1917)	September 15, 1898 – March 23, 1901	Nonpartisan	Elected in 1898.		Pedro Paterno (1857–1911)	September 15, 1898 – March 23, 1901	Nonpartisan	Elected in 1898.		Pio Romero	September 15, 1898 – March 23, 1901	Nonpartisan	Elected in 1898.	Malolos Congress	1898–1901; Bacarra, Badoc, Bangui, Batac, Dingras, Laoag, Paoay, Pasuquin, Piddig, San Miguel
District dissolved into Ilocos Norte's 1st and 2nd districts for the Philippine Assembly.

=== National Assembly (1935–1944) ===
==== Second Republic ====
Seat A					Seat B					Legislature	Constituency
Portrait	Member (Lifespan)	Term of office	Party	Electoral history	Portrait	Member (Lifespan)	Term of office	Party	Electoral history	Legislature	Constituency
District re-created September 7, 1943.
	Conrado Rubio (1896–1962)	September 25, 1943 – February 2, 1944	KALIBAPI	Elected in 1943.		Emilio L. Medina	September 25, 1943 – February 2, 1944	KALIBAPI	Appointed as an ex officio member. (Note: As Governor of Ilocos Norte.)	National Assembly (Second Republic)	1943–1944; Bacarra, Badoc, Bangui, Banna, Batac, Burgos, Currimao, Dingras, Laoag, Nueva Era, Paoay, Pasuquin, Piddig, Pinili, San Nicolas, Sarrat, Solsona, Vintar
District dissolved into Ilocos Norte's 1st and 2nd districts for the House of Representatives.

=== Batasang Pambansa (1978–1986) ===
Seat A					Seat B					Legislature	Constituency
Portrait	Member (Lifespan)	Term of office	Party	Electoral history	Portrait	Member (Lifespan)	Term of office	Party	Electoral history	Legislature	Constituency
District re-created February 1, 1984.
	Imee Marcos (born 1955)	June 30, 1984 – March 25, 1986	KBL	Elected in 1984.		Antonio Raquiza (1908–1999)	June 30, 1984 – March 25, 1986	KBL	Elected in 1984.	Regular Batasang Pambansa	1984–1986; Adams, Bacarra, Badoc, Bangui, Batac, Burgos, Carasi, Currimao, Dingras, Dumalneg, Espiritu, Laoag, Marcos, Nueva Era, Pagudpud, Paoay, Pasuquin, Piddig, Pinili, San Nicolas, Sarrat, Solsona, Vintar
District dissolved into Ilocos Norte's 1st and 2nd districts for the House of Representatives.

== Election results ==
=== 1984 ===
1984 Philippine parliamentary election in Ilocos Norte
Party	Candidate	Votes	%
KBL	Imee Marcos	199,837	—
KBL	Antonio Raquiza	164,117	—
Independent	Arturo Romero	23,197	—
UNIDO	Cesar Ventura	(?)	—
UNIDO	Damaso Samonte	(?)	—
UNIDO	Ross Tipon	(?)	—
Independent	Emerito Salva	(?)	—

== See also ==
- Legislative districts of Ilocos Norte
