= List of barangays in Ilocos Norte =

The province of Ilocos Norte has 559 barangays comprising its 21 municipalities and 2 cities.

== Barangays ==
Most populous in its respective city/municipality (as of 2010)

Barangay	Population					City or municipality
Barangay	2010	2007	2000	1995	1990	City or municipality
Ab-abut	370	424	336	328	355	Piddig
Abaca	1,711	1,663	1,465	1,457	1,370	Bangui
Abkir	1,233	1,063	990	945	1,002	Vintar
Ablan Poblacion (Labucao)	746	810	790	843	828	Batac
Ablan Sarat	1,497	1,326	1,269	1,232	1,129	Burgos
Abucay	1,521	1,503	1,508	1,383	1,339	Piddig
Acnam	554	480	483	508	476	Nueva Era
Acosta Poblacion (Iloilo)	1,159	1,071	1,006	1,083	1,047	Batac
Adams (Poblacion)	1,522	1,522	1,480	1,287	1,119	Adams
Agaga	542	498	476	504	494	Burgos
Aggasi	658	682	628	642	680	Pagudpud
Aglipay	652	622	585	514	464	Pinili
Aglipay (Poblacion)	1,253	1,253	1,064	1,216	1,006	Batac
Aguitap	841	781	775	737	700	Solsona
Alay-Nangbabaan (Alay 15-B)	1,049	1,051	968	934	916	Badoc
Albano (Poblacion)	771	734	711	752	646	Dingras
Alejo Malasig	1,220	1,186	974	817	783	Vintar
Alogoog	920	843	903	835	812	Badoc
Alsem	545	475	505	485	483	Vintar
Anao (Poblacion)	1,149	1,134	1,055	1,024	1,014	Piddig
Anggapang Norte	286	257	217	245	208	Currimao
Anggapang Sur	148	140	125	115	121	Currimao
Angset	160	145	125	104	95	Carasi
Apatut-Lubong	352	399	394	395	412	Pinili
Ar-arusip	872	811	726	710	699	Badoc
Aring	1,328	1,359	1,204	1,129	1,067	Badoc
Arua-ay	384	443	375	367	330	Piddig
Baay	3,141	3,258	2,817	2,909	2,668	Batac
Bacsil	685	635	547	504	506	Bangui
Bacsil	793	793	747	718	673	Dingras
Bacsil	620	591	553	553	494	Paoay
Badio	1,305	1,287	1,222	1,087	1,088	Pinili
Baduang	837	1,051	1,048	930	911	Pagudpud
Bagbag	617	570	553	513	533	Solsona
Bagbago	1,105	1,061	980	887	817	Solsona
Bago	392	439	425	449	454	Vintar
Bagut	1,051	942	911	839	794	Dingras
Balaoi	1,674	1,407	1,297	1,191	1,120	Pagudpud
Balbaldez	328	314	317	305	363	Badoc
Baligat	1,850	1,732	1,534	1,462	1,457	Batac
Balioeg	862	871	886	828	884	Banna (Espiritu)
Banban	723	704	717	722	673	Bangui
Bangsar	949	851	748	735	719	Banna (Espiritu)
Bani	948	849	775	647	698	Bacarra
Baoa East	1,442	678	643	555	570	Batac
Baoa West	1,186	1,186	1,159	1,023	1,015	Batac
Barangay No. 1, San Lorenzo (Poblacion)	4,391	3,601	3,394	2,650	2,138	Laoag
Barangay No. 10, San Jose (Poblacion)	993	1,161	1,119	1,076	1,093	Laoag
Barangay No. 11, Santa Balbina (Poblacion)	1,322	1,341	1,379	1,481	1,577	Laoag
Barangay No. 12, San Isidro (Poblacion)	1,603	1,770	1,650	1,746	1,541	Laoag
Barangay No. 13, Nuestra Señora de Visitacion (Poblacion)	1,193	1,193	1,171	1,158	1,043	Laoag
Barangay No. 14, Santo Tomas (Poblacion)	1,389	1,115	1,111	1,257	1,223	Laoag
Barangay No. 15, San Guillermo (Poblacion)	1,036	947	986	1,020	885	Laoag
Barangay No. 16, San Jacinto (Poblacion)	1,040	959	736	900	851	Laoag
Barangay No. 17, San Francisco (Poblacion)	671	771	1,146	1,309	1,240	Laoag
Barangay No. 18, San Quirino (Poblacion)	834	679	935	1,100	1,193	Laoag
Barangay No. 19, Santa Marcela (Poblacion)	1,101	1,048	1,003	1,158	1,047	Laoag
Barangay No. 2, Santa Joaquina (Poblacion)	2,367	2,320	2,296	1,895	1,894	Laoag
Barangay No. 20, San Miguel (Poblacion)	939	1,038	997	1,019	1,135	Laoag
Barangay No. 21, San Pedro (Poblacion)	1,261	1,259	1,230	1,398	1,218	Laoag
Barangay No. 22, San Andres (Poblacion)	1,170	940	1,256	1,214	1,181	Laoag
Barangay No. 23, San Matias (Poblacion)	2,295	2,319	2,327	2,119	1,967	Laoag
Barangay No. 24, Nuestra Señora de Consolacion (Poblacion)	979	929	1,006	957	888	Laoag
Barangay No. 25, Santa Cayetana (Poblacion)	1,094	1,153	1,082	978	1,004	Laoag
Barangay No. 26, San Marcelino (Poblacion)	1,067	975	997	1,027	1,036	Laoag
Barangay No. 27, Nuestra Señora de Soledad (Poblacion)	1,478	1,434	1,349	1,310	1,198	Laoag
Barangay No. 28, San Bernardo (Poblacion)	1,656	1,660	1,415	1,442	1,200	Laoag
Barangay No. 29, Santo Tomas (Poblacion)	1,326	2,596	796	864	841	Laoag
Barangay No. 3, Nuestra Señora del Rosario (Poblacion)	1,191	1,153	1,142	1,018	1,019	Laoag
Barangay No. 30-A, Suyo	761	736	619	580	623	Laoag
Barangay No. 30-B, Santa Maria	1,260	1,268	1,083	1,060	1,026	Laoag
Barangay No. 31, Talingaan	1,485	1,410	1,070	884	860	Laoag
Barangay No. 32-A, La Paz East	1,321	1,288	1,071	991	910	Laoag
Barangay No. 32-B, La Paz West	1,031	945	874	752	709	Laoag
Barangay No. 32-C, La Paz East	1,521	1,483	1,354	1,253	1,244	Laoag
Barangay No. 33-A, La Paz Proper	841	808	639	–	590	Laoag
Barangay No. 33-B, La Paz Proper	1,030	1,037	922	809	800	Laoag
Barangay No. 34-A, Gabu Norte West	773	743	616	625	631	Laoag
Barangay No. 34-B, Gabu Norte East	1,177	1,181	1,057	971	909	Laoag
Barangay No. 35, Gabu Sur	1,692	1,632	1,518	1,356	1,278	Laoag
Barangay No. 36, Araniw	810	728	689	682	770	Laoag
Barangay No. 37, Calayab	1,889	2,109	1,774	1,691	1,434	Laoag
Barangay No. 38-A, Mangato East	917	901	821	784	745	Laoag
Barangay No. 38-B, Mangato West	1,091	1,162	872	757	784	Laoag
Barangay No. 39, Santa Rosa	775	691	617	549	560	Laoag
Barangay No. 4, San Guillermo (Poblacion)	1,143	1,360	1,380	1,358	1,354	Laoag
Barangay No. 40, Balatong	2,638	2,204	1,820	1,586	1,401	Laoag
Barangay No. 41, Balacad	1,387	1,416	1,284	1,103	994	Laoag
Barangay No. 42, Apaya	892	882	815	785	774	Laoag
Barangay No. 43, Cavit	1,051	1,068	893	776	766	Laoag
Barangay No. 44, Zamboanga	1,259	1,197	999	931	852	Laoag
Barangay No. 45, Tangid	991	1,028	879	804	752	Laoag
Barangay No. 46, Nalbo	2,224	2,098	1,664	1,388	1,251	Laoag
Barangay No. 47, Bengcag	1,817	1,681	1,645	1,432	1,270	Laoag
Barangay No. 48-A, Cabungaan North	1,719	1,543	1,470	1,326	1,215	Laoag
Barangay No. 48-B, Cabungaan South	1,226	1,109	1,090	1,046	916	Laoag
Barangay No. 49-A, Darayday	741	791	830	840	821	Laoag
Barangay No. 49-B, Raraburan	1,512	1,156	1,058	791	808	Laoag
Barangay No. 5, San Pedro (Poblacion)	1,716	1,672	1,594	1,711	1,630	Laoag
Barangay No. 50, Buttong	2,734	2,629	2,405	2,074	1,676	Laoag
Barangay No. 51-A, Nangalisan East	1,509	1,431	1,465	1,010	1,073	Laoag
Barangay No. 51-B, Nangalisan West	706	815	946	752	776	Laoag
Barangay No. 52-A, San Mateo	629	610	622	548	488	Laoag
Barangay No. 52-B, Lataag	848	904	770	700	720	Laoag
Barangay No. 53, Rioeng	1,459	1,225	1,293	1,204	1,110	Laoag
Barangay No. 54-A, Camangaan	920	742	754	599	607	Laoag
Barangay No. 54-B, Lagui-Sail	2,199	2,233	1,814	1,564	1,485	Laoag
Barangay No. 55-A, Barit-Pandan	2,117	1,885	1,779	1,564	1,371	Laoag
Barangay No. 55-B, Salet-Bulangon	2,329	2,065	1,741	1,357	1,239	Laoag
Barangay No. 55-C, Vira	1,226	1,198	1,006	863	747	Laoag
Barangay No. 56-A, Bacsil North	905	906	815	757	784	Laoag
Barangay No. 56-B, Bacsil South	1,251	1,240	1,151	1,122	1,041	Laoag
Barangay No. 57, Pila	1,761	1,856	1,576	1,437	1,286	Laoag
Barangay No. 58, Casili	862	817	753	689	651	Laoag
Barangay No. 59-A, Dibua South	1,011	857	867	686	687	Laoag
Barangay No. 59-B, Dibua North	756	716	652	619	629	Laoag
Barangay No. 6, San Agustin (Poblacion)	1,451	1,819	1,832	1,686	1,727	Laoag
Barangay No. 60-A, Caaoacan	1,329	1,452	1,324	1,219	1,236	Laoag
Barangay No. 60-B, Madiladig	1,489	1,192	1,085	710	975	Laoag
Barangay No. 61, Cataban	729	694	642	555	579	Laoag
Barangay No. 62-A, Navotas North	808	760	732	695	623	Laoag
Barangay No. 62-B, Navotas South	936	886	794	664	656	Laoag
Barangay No. 7-A, Nuestra Señora del Natividad (Poblacion)	1,085	1,116	1,192	1,227	1,305	Laoag
Barangay No. 7-B, Nuestra Señora del Natividad (Poblacion)	961	785	918	1,011	987	Laoag
Barangay No. 8, San Vicente (Poblacion)	1,025	1,132	1,125	1,317	1,239	Laoag
Barangay No. 9, Santa Angela (Poblacion)	783	804	873	923	970	Laoag
Barangobong	355	440	283	299	202	Nueva Era
Barani (Poblacion)	1,184	579	608	598	574	Batac
Barbaqueso (Poblacion)	732	761	529	417	338	Carasi
Barbar	605	627	612	556	638	Pinili
Barbarangay	768	717	699	672	650	Banna (Espiritu)
Barcelona	1,281	1,193	1,175	1,077	1,124	Solsona
Baresbes	1,907	1,840	1,626	1,365	1,395	Dingras
Barikir	472	482	415	420	426	Nueva Era
Barong	2,257	2,207	2,213	1,941	1,924	Dingras
Baruyen	1,433	1,228	1,354	1,328	1,159	Bangui
Bato	975	971	789	825	748	Badoc
Batuli	391	366	380	294	268	Pasuquin
Bayog	681	643	597	525	530	Burgos
Ben-agan (Poblacion)	641	597	623	665	603	Batac
Bil-loca	2,743	2,592	2,053	1,969	1,926	Batac
Bimmanga	404	323	373	359	381	Currimao
Bimmanga	293	264	256	226	238	Piddig
Binacag	820	818	648	629	646	Banna (Espiritu)
Biningan	439	339	358	350	325	Batac
Binsang	841	812	791	694	648	Pasuquin
Bobon	1,317	1,246	1,238	1,207	1,170	Burgos
Bomitog	1,144	1,051	904	786	818	Banna (Espiritu)
Boyboy	1,531	1,531	1,361	1,207	1,139	Piddig
Buanga	444	441	421	365	384	Pinili
Bubuos	775	808	714	665	670	Solsona
Buduan (Malituek)	745	667	651	638	542	Burgos
Bugasi	954	880	807	755	713	Banna (Espiritu)
Bugayong	561	455	374	391	305	Nueva Era
Bulbulala	464	419	440	432	443	Pinili
Bulbulala	1,158	1,149	1,247	1,178	1,106	Vintar
Bungcag	543	595	488	459	498	Dingras
Bungon	1,400	1,458	1,516	1,248	1,479	Batac
Bungro	420	375	348	328	353	Pinili
Burayoc	1,420	1,230	1,035	1,005	1,004	Pagudpud
Buyon	1,524	1,341	1,238	1,082	993	Bacarra
Cabagoan	419	367	346	337	299	Paoay
Cabangaran	410	431	413	409	396	Paoay
Cabangaran	607	538	578	632	908	Vintar
Cabaroan	447	464	479	433	441	Pinili
Cabaroan (Poblacion)	948	856	799	788	761	Piddig
Cabaruan	1,437	1,342	1,356	1,167	1,285	Bacarra
Cabayo	561	553	630	655	659	Vintar
Cabisocolan	744	657	632	586	540	Vintar
Cabittauran	782	871	698	771	614	Nueva Era
Cabulalaan	748	749	758	728	738	Bacarra
Cabusligan	1,036	1,140	1,006	881	849	Bacarra
Cabuusan	335	310	296	323	236	Currimao
Cacafean	399	368	299	212	143	Marcos
Cadaratan	1,156	1,230	1,194	1,128	1,107	Bacarra
Caestebanan	1,037	911	848	787	707	Banna (Espiritu)
Calambeg	1,139	1,185	986	938	932	Piddig
Cali	1,270	1,207	1,073	1,058	1,131	Dingras
Calioet-Libong	753	734	753	659	596	Bacarra
Callaguip	1,960	1,892	1,948	1,914	1,929	Paoay
Callaguip (Poblacion)	826	801	751	797	774	Batac
Callusa	613	563	543	479	492	Piddig
Camandingan	1,451	1,376	1,351	1,086	1,226	Batac
Camanga	1,087	971	1,052	1,067	956	Badoc
Camguidan	508	470	468	457	416	Batac
Canaam	709	679	707	705	662	Vintar
Canaan (Poblacion)	570	620	512	535	477	Badoc
Cangrunaan (Poblacion)	955	930	872	894	819	Batac
Capacuan	689	664	612	579	470	Batac
Capangdanan	718	761	739	654	683	Pinili
Caparispisan	691	625	570	498	453	Pagudpud
Capasan	672	696	652	650	633	Dingras
Capurictan	1,065	1,016	944	874	936	Solsona
Caraitan	1,273	1,205	1,112	1,042	1,077	Badoc
Caray	691	666	528	521	426	Nueva Era
Caribquib	987	888	875	856	772	Banna (Espiritu)
Caruan	1,214	1,200	1,000	958	830	Pasuquin
Carusikis	790	727	657	631	614	Pasuquin
Carusipan	461	399	403	417	329	Pasuquin
Casilian	901	861	623	536	525	Bacarra
Catagtaguen	1,193	1,172	1,019	978	946	Banna (Espiritu)
Catangraran	1,270	1,186	1,230	1,021	951	Solsona
Caunayan	1,242	1,125	1,140	1,091	1,076	Pagudpud
Caunayan (Poblacion)	1,162	1,239	1,188	1,242	1,159	Batac
Cayubog	436	474	411	372	424	Paoay
Colo	1,297	1,081	1,000	914	852	Batac
Columbia	768	737	632	628	671	Vintar
Comcomloong	144	131	137	134	105	Currimao
Corocor	741	774	659	636	564	Bacarra
Crispina	917	898	827	736	675	Banna (Espiritu)
Dadaeman	314	349	305	282	277	Pasuquin
Dadaor	403	397	395	421	400	Bangui
Dagupan	612	474	579	537	536	Vintar
Dalayap	662	564	514	509	503	Pinili
Dampig	1,011	1,016	917	801	735	Pagudpud
Dancel (Poblacion)	572	532	495	498	530	Dingras
Daquioag	1,640	1,537	1,447	1,382	1,257	Marcos
Darasdas	1,419	1,252	1,188	1,106	1,137	Solsona
Darat	959	951	894	824	826	Pinili
Dariwdiw	1,863	1,814	1,753	1,564	1,491	Batac
Darupidip	348	325	327	317	298	Pasuquin
Davila	3,875	3,565	3,206	2,758	2,563	Pasuquin
Dilanis	415	366	417	408	369	Pasuquin
Dilavo	601	571	539	470	406	Pasuquin
Dipilat	1,154	1,142	1,075	971	978	Vintar
Dolores	465	413	476	456	490	Paoay
Dumalneg	1,814	1,716	1,486	1,109	828	Dumalneg
Dupitac	703	658	722	671	613	Piddig
Duripes	989	923	805	907	749	Bacarra
Elizabeth	993	936	933	899	953	Dingras
Elizabeth (Culao)	1,265	1,192	1,132	1,006	983	Marcos
Escoda	1,966	1,843	1,828	1,576	1,515	Marcos
Esperanza	303	340	331	311	279	Vintar
Espiritu	935	884	876	834	817	Dingras
Estancia	938	1,031	818	667	671	Pasuquin
Estancia	1,683	1,593	1,514	1,386	1,233	Piddig
Ester	1,522	1,375	1,288	1,241	1,158	Vintar
Ferdinand	876	905	766	676	725	Marcos
Fortuna	1,147	1,158	1,101	1,097	1,050	Marcos
Foz	845	846	734	720	752	Dingras
Gaang	1,211	1,079	1,057	969	941	Currimao
Gabut Norte	1,398	1,367	1,237	1,033	1,012	Badoc
Gabut Sur	997	923	832	842	720	Badoc
Gamaden	521	493	427	424	366	Nueva Era
Ganagan	734	713	663	621	572	Bacarra
Garreta (Poblacion)	1,343	1,479	1,415	1,325	1,261	Badoc
Gayamat	572	535	504	467	486	Piddig
Guerrero (Poblacion)	1,360	1,376	1,273	1,189	1,128	Dingras
Gulpeng	258	307	443	296	329	Pinili
Hilario (Poblacion)	959	935	880	899	861	Banna (Espiritu)
Imelda	594	625	540	541	468	Banna (Espiritu)
Imelda (Capariaan)	863	803	712	606	574	Marcos
Isic Isic	1,699	1,580	1,689	1,560	1,215	Vintar
Juan (Poblacion)	2,325	2,100	2,139	1,872	1,807	Solsona
La Virgen Milagrosa (Paguetpet)	1,037	1,009	908	807	651	Badoc
Labut	759	766	683	656	908	Badoc
Lacub (Poblacion)	478	455	532	553	554	Batac
Lacuben	1,327	1,194	1,215	1,088	999	Badoc
Lagandit	597	649	604	527	513	Piddig
Lanao	1,932	1,988	1,865	1,785	1,731	Bangui
Lanas	963	921	897	850	859	Dingras
Lang-ayan-Baramban	547	542	499	475	464	Currimao
Laoa	335	331	332	329	301	Paoay
Laureta (Poblacion)	1,328	1,391	1,308	1,219	1,201	Solsona
Libnaoan	596	594	571	515	441	Piddig
Libtong	1,547	1,508	1,473	1,363	1,274	Bacarra
Ligaya	1,027	939	880	716	773	Pagudpud
Liliputen	483	454	406	489	523	Pinili
Lioes	516	522	542	532	566	Currimao
Lipay	365	395	395	410	402	Solsona
Loing (Poblacion)	1,511	1,487	1,392	1,294	1,288	Piddig
Lorenzo (Poblacion)	838	800	853	834	794	Banna (Espiritu)
Lubigan	1,186	1,194	1,126	968	1,138	Badoc
Lubnac	1,513	1,358	1,397	1,360	1,366	Vintar
Lumbaan-Bicbica	636	486	689	587	549	Pinili
Lumbad	949	890	755	767	715	Dingras
Lydia (Poblacion)	2,133	2,228	1,770	1,482	1,347	Marcos
Maab-abaca	435	363	408	369	359	Piddig
Maananteng	1,181	1,261	1,239	1,109	1,014	Solsona
Mabaleng	1,101	1,002	934	865	764	Batac
Mabanbanag	633	567	572	533	543	Vintar
Mabusag Norte	1,155	1,206	1,061	1,121	967	Badoc
Mabusag Sur	1,165	1,119	1,020	949	789	Badoc
Mabuti	1,031	935	946	854	850	Marcos
Macayepyep	1,206	1,165	942	1,023	942	Banna (Espiritu)
Macupit	635	631	593	528	487	Bacarra
Madamba (Poblacion)	1,957	1,995	1,859	1,793	1,702	Dingras
Madupayas	848	813	789	805	717	Badoc
Maglaoi Centro	230	212	209	185	282	Currimao
Maglaoi Norte	633	584	549	472	503	Currimao
Maglaoi Sur	496	457	381	439	371	Currimao
Magnuang	1,774	1,833	1,761	1,611	1,476	Batac
Maipalig	559	518	569	468	464	Batac
Malampa (Peninaan-Malampa)	764	740	700	609	631	Vintar
Malasin	941	933	878	800	711	Bangui
Manalpac	1,949	1,761	1,552	1,410	1,512	Solsona
Manarang	676	692	671	616	627	Vintar
Manayon	1,029	962	939	932	857	Bangui
Mandaloque	649	663	604	565	542	Dingras
Mangitayag	605	564	533	484	460	Piddig
Marcos (Poblacion)	959	945	904	808	778	Banna (Espiritu)
Margaay	805	748	740	676	641	Vintar
Mariquet	1,157	1,042	1,001	940	804	Solsona
Maruaya	823	790	728	630	632	Piddig
Masikil	641	611	595	537	507	Bangui
Masintoc	633	581	629	643	648	Paoay
Medina	1,207	1,128	1,022	933	910	Dingras
Monte	617	646	546	495	423	Paoay
Morong	785	689	612	631	657	Badoc
Mumulaan	770	694	632	590	528	Paoay
Nagbacalan	1,093	1,062	952	983	895	Batac
Nagbacalan	2,738	2,793	2,570	2,450	2,235	Paoay
Nagbalagan	720	651	634	584	535	Bangui
Naglicuan	1,390	1,363	1,103	950	945	Pasuquin
Nagpatayan	898	881	804	828	745	Banna (Espiritu)
Nagpatpatan	684	656	556	547	467	Solsona
Nagrebcan	490	644	1,311	1,331	1,296	Badoc
Nagsanga	1,140	1,002	885	852	721	Pasuquin
Nagsurot	803	636	633	639	540	Burgos
Nagtrigoan	634	682	657	629	639	Pinili
Naguillan (Pagpag-ong)	634	564	514	522	439	Nueva Era
Naguirangan	1,183	1,023	974	885	746	Batac
Nalasin	1,240	1,223	1,157	1,164	1,093	Paoay
Nalasin	708	711	730	672	686	Solsona
Nalvo (Cababaan-Nalvo)	534	462	560	426	378	Pasuquin
Nambaran	965	922	866	841	825	Bacarra
Namoroc	813	728	692	631	705	Vintar
Nanguyudan	687	711	645	649	591	Paoay
Napu	1,495	1,542	864	913	740	Badoc
Natba	501	539	511	483	564	Bacarra
Ngabangab	746	691	641	641	574	Pasuquin
Oaig-Upay-Abulao	553	581	525	470	505	Paoay
Paayas	699	578	576	573	533	Burgos
Pacifico (Agunit)	1,694	1,664	1,494	1,349	1,311	Marcos
Pagali	699	659	643	592	529	Burgos
Pagdilao (Poblacion)	1,187	1,159	1,165	1,094	1,078	Pinili
Pagsanahan Norte	1,076	1,015	1,069	1,044	982	Badoc
Pagsanahan Sur	1,146	1,185	1,343	1,159	1,130	Badoc
Paguludan-Salindeg	318	329	321	247	264	Currimao
Palongpong	1,672	1,557	1,486	1,306	1,213	Batac
Palpalicong (Poblacion)	732	721	653	748	514	Batac
Paltit	1,528	1,437	395	372	419	Badoc
Pambaran	293	263	299	305	286	Paoay
Pancian	2,001	1,886	1,738	1,501	1,373	Pagudpud
Pangil	632	613	601	575	597	Currimao
Pangil	403	384	340	306	252	Pasuquin
Paninaan	401	422	401	380	381	Bacarra
Pannaratan (Poblacion)	221	223	214	246	235	Paoay
Parado (Bangay)	1,446	1,291	1,309	1,168	1,126	Dingras
Parang	392	414	430	448	408	Badoc
Parangopong	1,282	1,084	1,051	882	909	Batac
Paratong	1,079	1,149	993	904	936	Paoay
Parparoroc	1,197	1,121	1,083	926	920	Vintar
Parut	1,329	1,275	1,078	971	900	Vintar
Pasaleng	1,664	1,507	1,387	1,207	1,206	Pagudpud
Pasil	971	944	850	824	771	Paoay
Pasiocan	1,162	1,161	1,014	1,029	843	Bacarra
Pasngal	685	738	626	554	484	Bacarra
Pasuc	502	444	839	870	794	Badoc
Payac	817	722	776	772	745	Bangui
Payao	1,365	1,266	1,242	1,175	1,117	Batac
Pedro F. Alviar (Diaton)	939	880	896	839	934	Vintar
Peralta (Poblacion)	1,307	1,239	1,208	1,171	1,068	Dingras
Pias Norte	853	821	764	782	632	Currimao
Pias Sur	714	727	630	690	517	Currimao
Pimentel (Cubol)	1,165	1,144	1,107	1,003	913	Batac
Pipias	983	1,070	1,092	984	1,010	Bacarra
Poblacion	1,507	1,351	1,322	1,335	1,234	Burgos
Poblacion	1,795	1,592	1,221	1,247	1,151	Nueva Era
Poblacion 1	2,219	2,116	1,907	1,756	1,635	Pagudpud
Poblacion 1	1,122	1,077	1,136	1,197	1,292	Pasuquin
Poblacion 2	2,853	2,650	2,669	2,339	2,222	Pagudpud
Poblacion 2	1,904	1,685	1,820	1,730	1,747	Pasuquin
Poblacion 3	1,016	1,064	1,078	1,052	986	Pasuquin
Poblacion 4	1,411	1,364	1,303	1,354	1,348	Pasuquin
Poblacion I	848	853	800	779	648	Currimao
Poblacion II	565	504	514	491	399	Currimao
Pragata (Pragata-Bungro)	509	390	445	394	386	Pasuquin
Pugaoan	525	559	547	513	567	Pinili
Pulangi	1,076	996	985	827	737	Bacarra
Pungto	551	633	596	552	601	Bacarra
Puritac	592	562	545	506	533	Pinili
Puruganan (Poblacion)	828	818	807	751	731	Dingras
Puttao	1,053	1,106	1,213	1,090	950	Solsona
Puyupuyan	831	701	580	499	465	Pasuquin
Puzol	271	241	235	243	266	Pinili
Quiling Norte	1,188	1,171	953	1,006	907	Batac
Quiling Sur	2,313	2,477	2,350	2,006	1,798	Batac
Quiom	898	802	806	894	739	Batac
Rayuray	955	902	845	794	789	Batac
Ricarte Poblacion (Nalasin)	793	774	821	864	963	Batac
Root (Baldias)	780	756	701	637	617	Dingras
Sacritan	1,161	1,110	1,080	1,008	840	Pinili
Sagpatan	780	789	747	684	669	Dingras
Saguigui	793	727	777	732	676	Pagudpud
Salanap	530	480	476	508	526	Pinili
Salbang (Poblacion)	678	648	594	523	440	Paoay
Salpad	599	558	488	429	424	Pasuquin
Salsalamagui	1,160	1,016	1,031	956	901	Vintar
Saludares	1,336	1,277	1,161	1,133	1,110	Dingras
Salugan	448	427	343	291	279	Currimao
San Agustin	994	897	881	905	870	Paoay
San Agustin	1,932	1,948	1,620	1,450	1,390	San Nicolas
San Agustin (Poblacion)	593	542	608	605	684	Sarrat
San Agustin I (Poblacion)	475	499	404	404	352	Bacarra
San Agustin II (Poblacion)	270	232	242	195	207	Bacarra
San Andres	1,427	1,325	1,164	1,009	922	Sarrat
San Andres I (Poblacion)	730	751	774	696	650	Bacarra
San Andres II (Poblacion)	817	840	772	764	765	Bacarra
San Antonio	664	561	693	820	776	Piddig
San Antonio	1,184	1,113	1,135	1,037	1,078	Sarrat
San Baltazar (Poblacion)	747	694	814	684	668	San Nicolas
San Bartolome (Poblacion)	852	778	706	557	565	San Nicolas
San Bernabe	266	271	253	259	252	Sarrat
San Blas (Poblacion)	244	262	241	254	257	Paoay
San Cayetano (Poblacion)	809	833	787	737	696	San Nicolas
San Cristobal	1,587	1,504	1,627	1,563	1,733	Sarrat
San Esteban	782	741	641	555	533	Dingras
San Eugenio (Poblacion)	1,048	1,032	1,065	1,008	919	San Nicolas
San Felipe	1,077	1,017	1,002	814	879	Sarrat
San Fernando (Poblacion)	1,005	1,080	1,030	972	922	San Nicolas
San Francisco (Poblacion)	1,502	1,550	1,458	1,369	1,198	San Nicolas
San Francisco (Poblacion)	888	989	958	911	969	Sarrat
San Francisco (Surrate)	2,001	1,835	1,691	1,663	1,534	Dingras
San Gabriel I (Poblacion)	254	295	272	222	228	Bacarra
San Gabriel II (Poblacion)	426	414	396	388	370	Bacarra
San Gregorio (Poblacion)	1,534	1,558	1,492	1,428	1,338	San Nicolas
San Guillermo	1,536	1,520	1,321	1,215	1,123	San Nicolas
San Ildefonso (Poblacion)	1,274	1,236	1,371	1,283	1,246	San Nicolas
San Isidro	798	764	725	665	624	Bangui
San Isidro	1,058	1,022	915	866	834	Sarrat
San Joaquin (Poblacion)	1,404	1,189	1,199	1,134	1,121	Sarrat
San Jose	1,519	1,371	1,388	1,264	1,192	Sarrat
San Jose (Lipay)	826	799	863	888	919	Vintar
San Jose (Poblacion)	1,066	1,085	1,055	1,025	988	San Nicolas
San Juan	279	237	274	245	258	Paoay
San Juan	1,442	1,425	1,300	1,198	1,052	Pasuquin
San Juan	818	802	835	847	760	Sarrat
San Juan	501	443	492	442	407	Solsona
San Juan Bautista (Poblacion)	3,138	2,663	2,567	2,435	2,220	San Nicolas
San Julian	262	281	210	202	232	Solsona
San Julian (Poblacion)	547	551	561	522	525	Batac
San Leandro (Poblacion)	1,319	1,237	1,208	1,103	1,176	Sarrat
San Lorenzo	2,244	2,292	2,014	1,858	1,748	San Nicolas
San Lorenzo	1,011	942	822	738	724	Sarrat
San Lorenzo (Poblacion)	2,000	2,206	2,274	2,161	2,074	Bangui
San Lucas (Poblacion)	1,377	1,501	1,366	1,301	1,321	San Nicolas
San Manuel	792	747	708	583	550	Sarrat
San Marcelino (Padong)	3,504	3,368	3,110	2,891	2,672	Dingras
San Marcos	672	691	684	644	634	Dingras
San Marcos	1,322	1,294	1,177	1,102	1,027	Sarrat
San Marcos (Payas)	2,112	1,949	1,664	1,428	1,339	San Nicolas
San Mateo	1,089	1,031	943	903	838	Batac
San Miguel (Poblacion)	1,584	1,653	1,706	1,564	1,575	San Nicolas
San Nicolas	1,730	1,758	1,674	1,556	1,523	Sarrat
San Nicolas (Poblacion)	1,125	1,064	1,073	1,126	1,035	Vintar
San Pablo	1,662	1,612	1,493	1,428	1,282	San Nicolas
San Paulo (Poblacion)	978	825	1,009	946	940	San Nicolas
San Pedro	921	867	865	788	826	Batac
San Pedro	728	582	561	518	475	Paoay
San Pedro	853	804	760	650	579	Sarrat
San Pedro (Bingao)	1,745	1,736	1,610	1,420	1,388	San Nicolas
San Pedro (Poblacion)	887	894	881	830	855	Vintar
San Pedro I (Poblacion)	379	466	485	481	405	Bacarra
San Pedro II (Poblacion)	403	609	485	461	466	Bacarra
San Ramon (Poblacion)	1,206	1,058	1,113	1,019	982	Vintar
San Roque	970	916	785	679	671	Sarrat
San Roque (Poblacion)	1,047	1,081	958	963	940	Paoay
San Roque (Poblacion)	1,051	1,018	896	834	774	Vintar
San Roque I (Poblacion)	496	488	496	484	531	Bacarra
San Roque II (Poblacion)	392	416	419	374	439	Bacarra
San Rufino (Poblacion)	1,121	1,110	1,162	1,038	1,069	San Nicolas
San Silvestre (Poblacion)	868	818	823	775	738	San Nicolas
San Simeon	283	347	271	262	302	Currimao
San Simon I (Poblacion)	626	582	591	572	591	Bacarra
San Simon II (Poblacion)	384	453	397	439	387	Bacarra
San Vicente (Poblacion)	621	651	594	533	517	Bacarra
San Vicente (Poblacion)	861	858	817	797	794	Sarrat
Sangil	985	968	944	993	877	Bacarra
Sangladan Poblacion (Nalbuan)	459	441	437	484	481	Paoay
Santa Ana	1,212	1,163	1,116	1,021	952	Solsona
Santa Asuncion (Samac)	788	784	753	661	686	San Nicolas
Santa Barbara (Poblacion)	577	606	597	641	673	Sarrat
Santa Catalina	933	831	843	763	726	Pasuquin
Santa Cecilia (Barabar)	1,692	1,755	1,545	1,298	1,234	San Nicolas
Santa Cruz	305	259	238	229	217	Currimao
Santa Cruz Norte	1,048	963	558	550	535	Badoc
Santa Cruz Sur	685	617	1,109	958	966	Badoc
Santa Filomena I (Poblacion)	306	273	248	239	246	Bacarra
Santa Filomena II (Poblacion)	326	348	356	337	356	Bacarra
Santa Magdalena	839	759	780	772	747	Sarrat
Santa Maria	1,437	1,314	1,264	1,085	1,010	Piddig
Santa Maria (Poblacion)	981	990	907	920	863	Vintar
Santa Matilde	429	386	410	443	412	Pasuquin
Santa Monica (Nagrebcan)	1,623	1,630	1,257	1,203	1,039	San Nicolas
Santa Rita (Poblacion)	1,099	1,005	1,121	1,090	1,141	Bacarra
Santa Rita (Poblacion)	718	693	595	635	663	Paoay
Santa Rosa	1,051	1,082	920	919	934	Sarrat
Santiago	1,317	1,392	1,154	1,101	982	Marcos
Santiago	901	973	863	851	748	Solsona
Santo Cristo I (Poblacion)	436	381	426	368	381	Bacarra
Santo Cristo II (Poblacion)	458	470	438	419	396	Bacarra
Santo Niño	655	621	452	398	248	Nueva Era
Santo Santiago	712	739	688	661	661	Sarrat
Santo Tomas	701	664	570	531	532	Pinili
Santo Tomas	912	923	866	791	789	Sarrat
Saoit	646	640	610	545	510	Burgos
Sapat	32	76	86	181	54	Pasuquin
Saud	1,166	1,199	750	708	706	Badoc
Saud	1,376	1,357	1,174	973	872	Pagudpud
Sideg	418	383	347	294	439	Paoay
Sinamar	1,105	1,029	949	904	851	Banna (Espiritu)
Suabit (Poblacion)	1,174	1,178	1,060	1,227	1,098	Batac
Suba	1,573	1,399	1,248	1,170	1,138	Paoay
Subec	1,506	1,236	1,361	1,097	1,086	Pagudpud
Sucsuquen	650	677	624	604	604	Piddig
Sulbec	775	767	717	590	660	Pasuquin
Sulongan	450	379	368	367	279	Pasuquin
Sulquiano (Sidiran)	1,389	1,360	1,227	1,246	1,271	Dingras
Sumader	1,201	1,190	1,136	1,079	1,025	Batac
Sungadan	1,296	1,131	1,090	1,089	1,074	Paoay
Surgui	788	782	735	770	822	Paoay
Surong	303	307	275	284	228	Pasuquin
Susugaen	1,296	1,142	1,035	1,011	888	Pasuquin
Suyo	1,361	1,361	1,174	1,175	1,074	Dingras
Tabtabagan	1,135	1,104	987	905	957	Banna (Espiritu)
Tabucbuc (Ragas)	1,640	1,696	1,589	1,432	1,361	Marcos
Tabug	3,261	3,264	3,036	2,571	2,398	Batac
Tabungao	177	211	196	201	126	Pasuquin
Tadao	322	331	287	263	194	Pasuquin
Taguiporo	586	581	577	523	476	Bangui
Talugtog	991	1,052	965	994	833	Solsona
Tambidao	762	615	486	400	370	Bacarra
Tamdagan	1,221	1,062	1,131	1,013	1,093	Vintar
Tanap	551	521	519	437	432	Burgos
Tangaoan	986	1,021	1,032	1,053	994	Piddig
Tapao-Tigue	689	591	572	482	423	Currimao
Tarrag	905	831	787	689	736	Pagudpud
Tartarabang	1,031	924	914	826	881	Pinili
Teppang	707	640	533	621	615	Bacarra
Tonoton	1,396	1,325	1,251	1,152	1,069	Piddig
Torre	459	404	410	359	378	Currimao
Tubburan	823	813	802	814	768	Bacarra
Turod	778	699	713	–	–	Badoc
Uguis	817	811	700	723	585	Nueva Era
Upon	607	558	556	513	506	Pinili
Utol	606	589	586	583	553	Bangui
Valbuena (Poblacion)	1,088	1,089	972	977	946	Pinili
Valdez	957	924	921	869	811	Banna (Espiritu)
Valdez (Biding)	1,013	990	916	915	892	Marcos
Valdez Poblacion (Caoayan)	863	875	879	947	916	Batac
Valenciano (Poblacion)	769	696	663	602	605	Banna (Espiritu)
Ver (Naglayaan)	1,141	1,082	981	937	878	Dingras
Veronica	287	274	245	293	239	Paoay
Victoria	906	873	766	698	633	Currimao
Virbira	581	529	500	229	199	Carasi
Visaya	1,095	1,008	1,025	1,013	961	Vintar
Barangay	2010	2007	2000	1995	1990	City or municipality
*Italicized names are former names.; *Dashes (–) in cells indicate unavailable census data.

[top]
