= Solsona =

Solsona may refer to:

- Solsona, Ilocos Norte, municipality in the Philippines
- Solsona, Lleida, a municipality and capital of the comarca of the Solsonès in the province of Lleida, Catalonia, Spain
