= 1898 Philippine legislative election =

- June 23 – September 10, 1898

68 (of the 136 (Note: In the book Malolos: The Crisis of the Republic by Teodoro Agoncillo, the Malolos Congress had 193 delegates (42 elected and 151 appointed).)) seats to the Malolos Congress
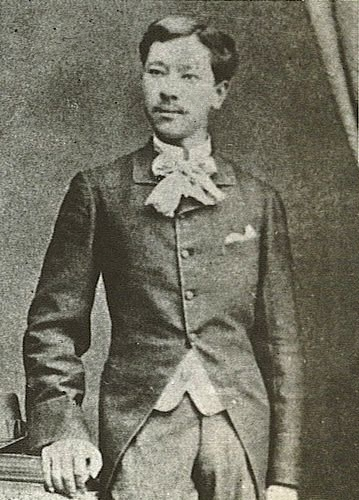
Leader	Pedro Paterno
Leader's seat	Ilocos Norte
Seats won	68
Congress President before election
None (This was the first Philippine legislative election)
Elected Congress President
Pedro Paterno

The elections for the Malolos Congress, also known as the Revolutionary Congress, were held in the Philippines from June 23 to September 10, 1898.

These were the first elections for a national legislature in the Philippines. The Spanish colonial government held elections in 1895 across the Philippines but for local municipal officers only. Many parts of the Visayas and Mindanao did not elect representatives and as a result their representatives were appointed later on.

The first fully elected national legislative body occurred under American rule with the 1907 Philippine Assembly elections as the only elected house of the bicameral Philippine Legislature.

== Background ==
Following the defeat of the Spanish at the Battle of Manila Bay during the Spanish–American War on May 1, 1898, by the American Navy, Philippine revolutionary forces under Emilio Aguinaldo declared the Philippines to be an independent nation on June 12, 1898. The Revolutionary Government of the Philippines held these elections following that declaration.

After the Spanish sold the Philippines to the Americans in the Treaty of Paris of 1898, signed on December 10, 1898, the First Philippine Republic, which includes the Malolos Congress, fought the Philippine–American War against the American colonial forces, eventually losing the war.

There would not be another attempt at national legislative election until the 1907 elections which established the Philippine Assembly. The Assembly, unlike the Malolos Congress, was fully elected but it was only one house of a bicameral legislature, the Philippine Legislature, the other house being the unelected Philippine Commission.

== Electoral system ==
The manner of election of delegates was via a series of indirect elections. In districts where the delegates were not appointed by the government, the manner of election was as follows:

1. A big assembly of select citizens in every town and shall elect by majority vote a mayor, and officials each for Police and Public Order, Justice and Civil Registry, and of Revenues and Property.
2. The town mayor, the three officials, and heads of the barrios shall constitute the Popular Assembly.
3. All town mayors in a province shall constitute the Provincial Assembly, and they shall elect by majority vote the Governor and three councilors.
4. The Governor of the province, as the president, the mayor of the provincial capital, as the vice president, and the three councilors shall constitute the Provincial Council.
5. The Provincial Council shall elect three representatives for Manila and Cavite, two representatives for other regular provinces, and one for other provinces and politico-military command posts.

== Results ==
=== National ===
The following is a list of congress officers elected.

Position	Name
President	Pedro A. Paterno
Vice-president	Benito Legarda
Secretary	Gregorio S. Araneta
Secretary	Pablo Ocampo

Paterno defeated General Antonio Luna with a vote of 24–23; Legarda against Aguedo Velarde with 21–9; and Araneta and Ocampo won with 31 and 27 votes, respectively.

=== Local ===
The following is a list of congress members by province as of July 7, 1899.

Province	Elected	Appointed (Note: Delegates representing provinces not at the time in a position to elect their own representatives were appointed as needed by the Revolutionary Government.)
Manila	4	0
Ambos Camarines	4	0
Batangas	4	0
Bulacan	4	0
Cavite	4	0
Ilocos Norte	6	0
Ilocos Sur	3	1
Laguna	4	0
Pampanga	4	0
Pangasinan	2	2
Iloilo	0	4
Cebu	0	4
Leyte	0	4
Albay	4	1
Cagayan	1	2
Bataan	3	0
Isabela	2	1
Union	1	2
Nueva Ecija	3	0
Tarlac	3	0
Zambales	2	1
Sorsogon	0	3
Negros Occidental	0	3
Negros Oriental	0	3
Samar	0	3
Capiz	0	3
Antigua	0	3
Bohol	0	3
Zamboanga	0	3
Misamis	0	3
Calamianes	0	3
Masbate	0	3
Mindoro	1	2
Morong	2	0
Lepanto	3	0
Batanes Islands	1	1
Nueva Vizcaya	1	1
Abra	1	0
Padre Burgos (Benguet)	1	2
Catanduanes	0	2
Paragua	0	2
Totals	68	68
Totals	136	

== See also ==
- Malolos Congress
- Commission on Elections
- Politics of the Philippines
- Philippine elections
