= Antonio Raquiza =

Filipino lawyer and politician

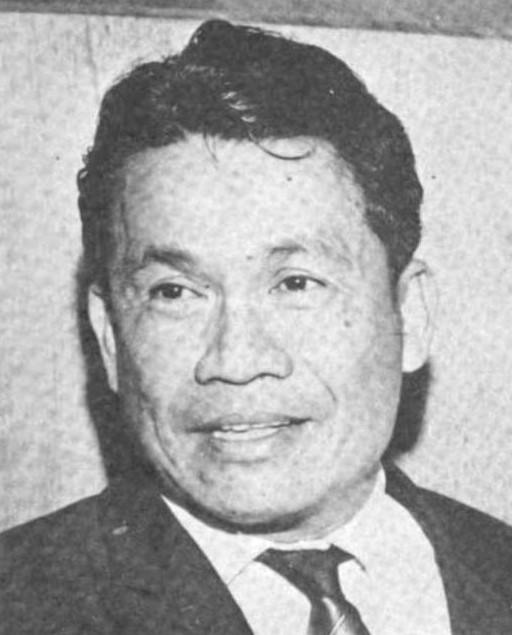
- Representative Raquiza's official portrait during the 6th Congress.

16th Governor of Ilocos Norte
- In office December 30, 1955 – December 30, 1957
- Preceded by: Damaso T. Samonte
- Succeeded by: Jose E. Evangelista

Member of the Philippine House of Representatives from Ilocos Norte's 1st District
- In office December 30, 1957 – August 24, 1966
- Preceded by: Vacant
- Succeeded by: Roque R. Ablan Jr.
- In office December 30, 1949 – December 30, 1955
- Preceded by: Damaso T. Samonte
- Succeeded by: Vacant

Secretary of Public Works, Transportation and Communications
- In office August 24, 1966 – 1968
- President: Ferdinand Marcos
- Preceded by: Jorge Abad
- Succeeded by: Rene Espina

Mambabatas Pambansa (Assemblyman) from Region I
- In office June 12, 1978 – June 5, 1984

Mambabatas Pambansa (Assemblyman) from Ilocos Norte
- In office June 30, 1984 – March 25, 1986 Serving with Imee Marcos

Personal details
- Born: Antonio Valentin Raquiza; February 29, 1908 Piddig, Ilocos Norte, Philippine Islands
- Died: December 24, 1999 (aged 91)
- Resting place: Libingan ng mga Bayani
- Party: Kilusang Bagong Lipunan (1978–1987)
- Other political affiliations: Liberal
- Spouse: Pacita Torres Katigbak
- Education: University of the Philippines College of Law
- Occupation: Politician
- Profession: Lawyer

Antonio Valentin Raquiza (February 29, 1908 – December 24, 1999) was a Filipino lawyer and politician. He was from Piddig, Ilocos Norte.

== Political career ==
Raquiza served as representative of the 1st District of Ilocos Norte in the Philippine House of Representatives from 1949 to 1955, 1957 to 1966 and as a mambabatas pambansa from Region I from 1978 to 1984 and from Ilocos Norte from 1984 to 1986. He became governor of Ilocos Norte from 1955 to 1957. He was appointed by former President Ferdinand Marcos as Secretary of Public Works, Transportation and Communications from 1966 to 1968. He was one of the delegates in 1971 Constitutional Convention. He vied for a Senate seat in 1987 and lost.

== Personal life ==
He was born on February 29, 1908, to Canuto Raquiza and Benilda Valentin. He died on December 24, 1999. He was interred at Libingan ng mga Bayani in Taguig, Metro Manila.
