= Legislative districts of Ilocos Norte =

Legislative district of the Philippines

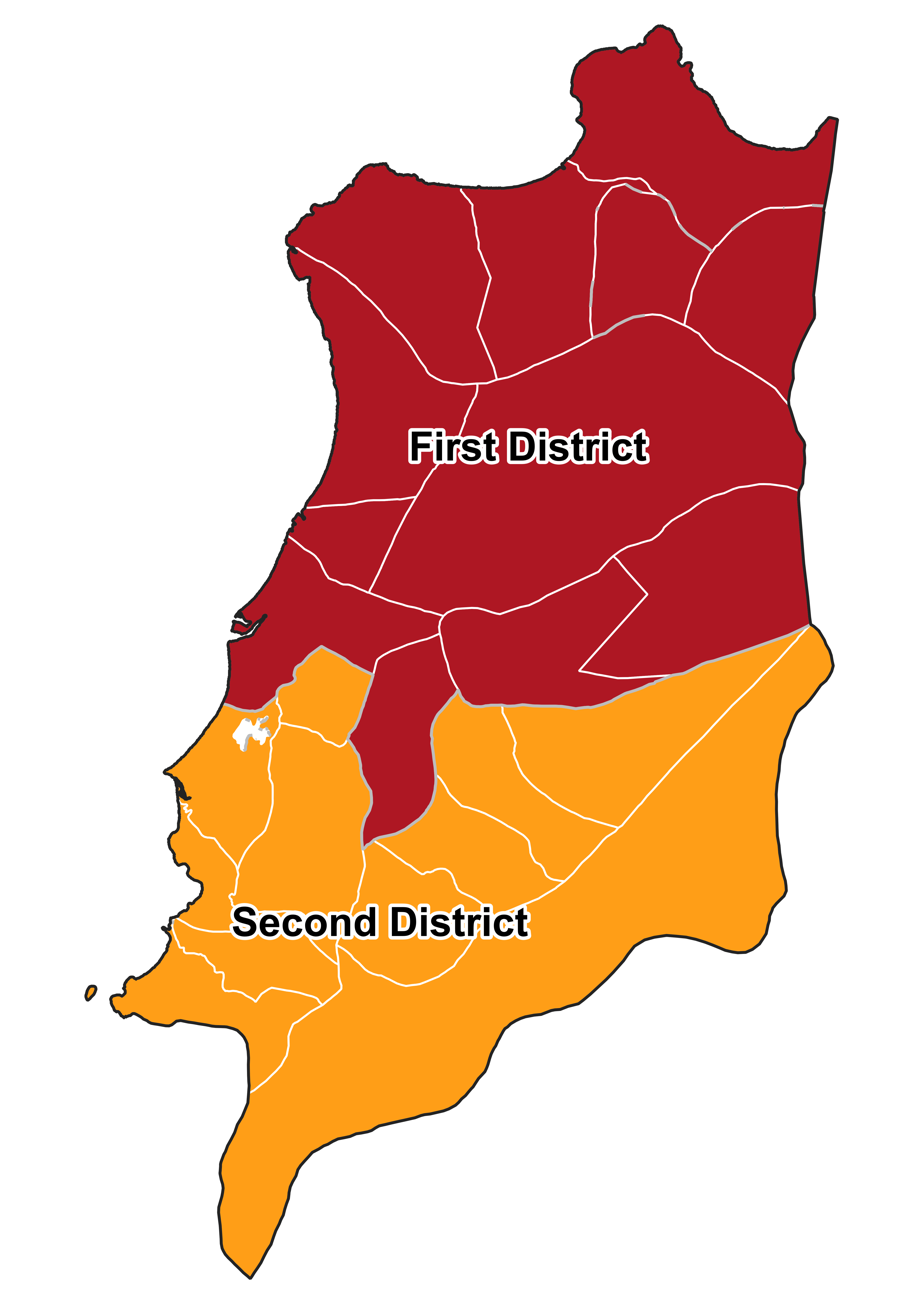
Map of legislative districts of Ilocos Norte

The legislative districts of Ilocos Norte are the representations of the province of Ilocos Norte in the various national legislatures of the Philippines. The province is currently represented in the lower house of the Congress of the Philippines through its first and second congressional districts.

The first and second districts of Ilocos Norte are among the original representative districts from 1907 which has never changed in territorial coverage, along with the first districts of Albay, of Ilocos Sur and of Iloilo.

== History ==
The province has been divided into two districts since 1907. When seats for the upper house of the Philippine Legislature were elected from territory-based districts between 1916 and 1935, the province formed part of the first senatorial district which elected two out of the 24-member senate.

In the disruption caused by the Second World War, two delegates represented the province in the National Assembly of the Japanese-sponsored Second Philippine Republic: one was the provincial governor (an ex officio member), while the other was elected through a provincial assembly of KALIBAPI members during the Japanese occupation of the Philippines. Upon the restoration of the Philippine Commonwealth in 1945, the province continued to comprise two representative districts.

Ilocos Norte was represented in the Interim Batasang Pambansa as part of Region I from 1978 to 1984, and returned two representatives, elected at-large to the Regular Batasang Pambansa from 1984 to 1986. The province retained its two congressional districts under the new Constitution which was proclaimed on February 11, 1987, and elected members to the restored House of Representatives starting that same year.

== Current districts ==
Ilocos Norte's current congressional delegation is composed of two members.

Political parties

Lakas (1)
Nacionalista (1)

Legislative districts and representatives of Ilocos Norte
District	Current Representative		Party	Constituent LGUs	Population (2020)	Area	Map
District	Image	Name	Party	Constituent LGUs	Population (2020)	Area	Map
1st		Ferdinand Alexander A. Marcos III (since 2022); Laoag	Lakas	List: Adams; Bacarra; Bangui; Burgos; Carasi; Dumalneg; Laoag; Pagudpud; Pasuquin; Piddig; Sarrat; Vintar	311,977	2,047.42 km²	
2nd		Eugenio Angelo M. Barba (since 2019); Batac	Nacionalista	List: Badoc; Banna; Batac; Currimao; Dingras; Marcos; Nueva Era; Paoay; Pinili; San Nicolas; Solsona	297,611	1,420.47 km²	

== At-Large (defunct) ==
Period	Representatives
National Assembly; 1943–1944	Conrado Rubio
National Assembly; 1943–1944	Emilio L. Medina (ex officio)
Regular Batasang Pambansa; 1984–1986	Imee Marcos
Regular Batasang Pambansa; 1984–1986	Antonio V. Raquiza
