= Pasuquin =

Municipality in Ilocos Norte, Philippines

Pasuquin Santiago de Pasuquin
- Municipality
- Municipality of Pasuquin
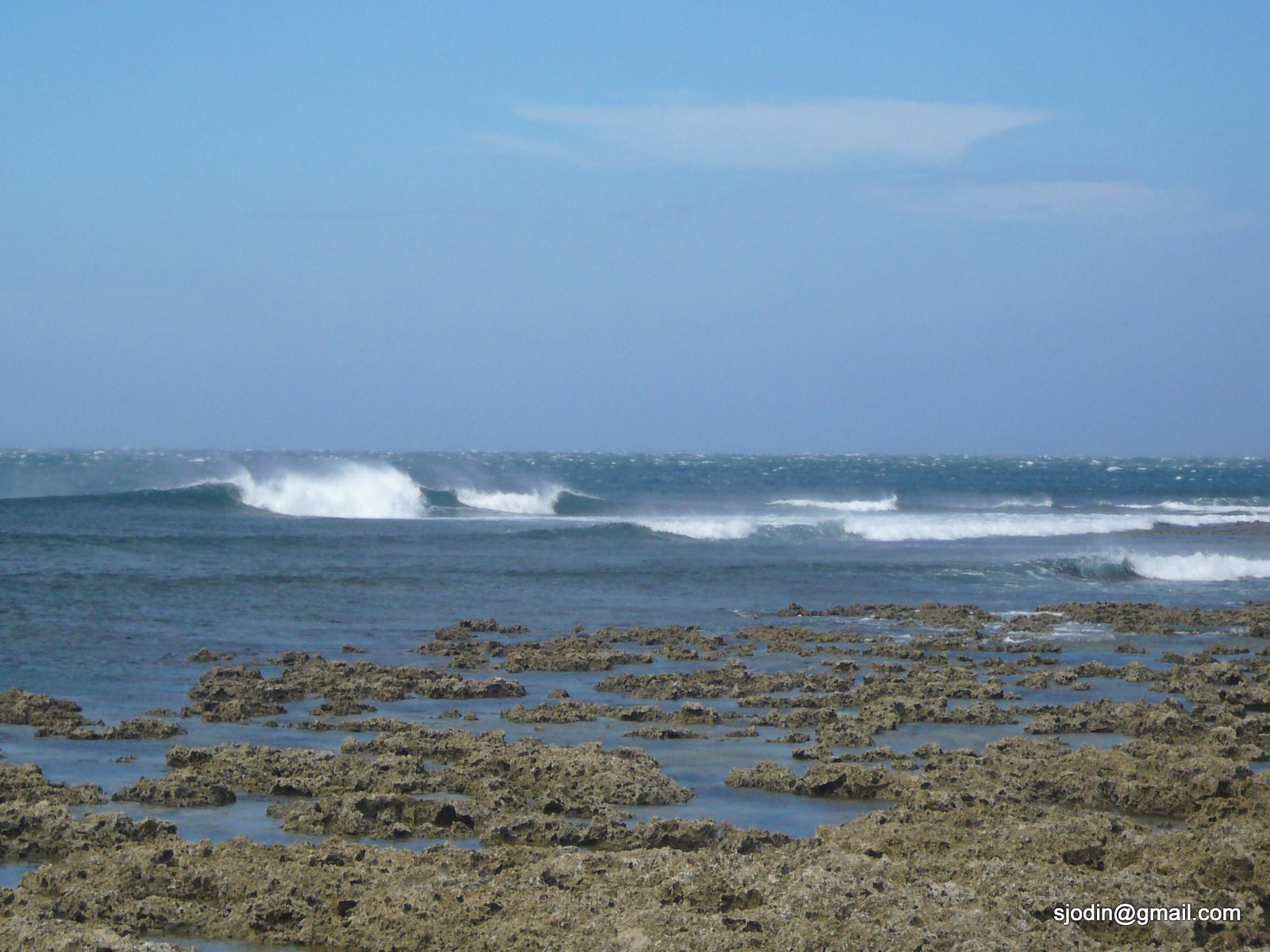
- Barangay Davila coast

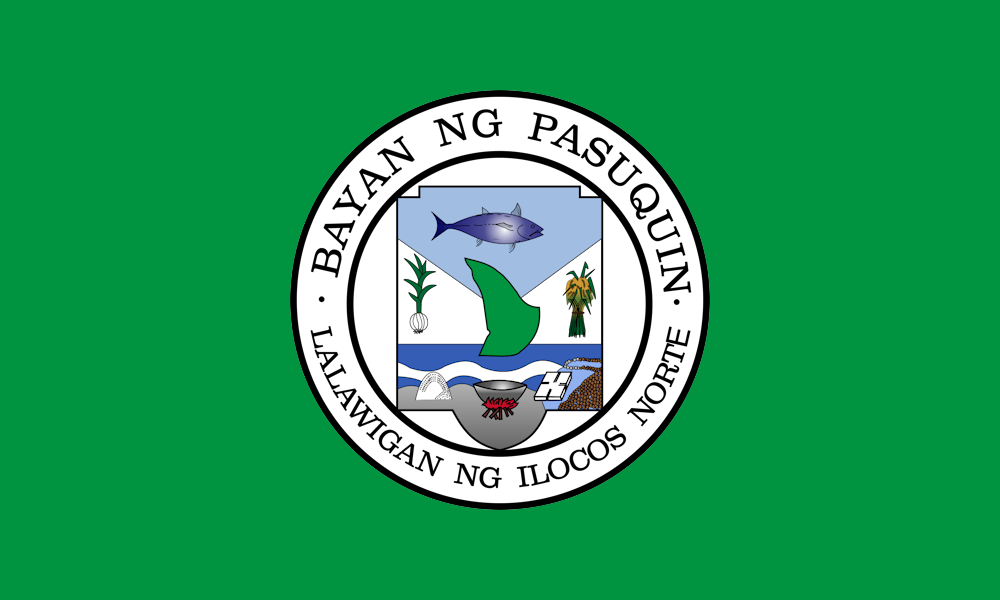
- Flag Seal

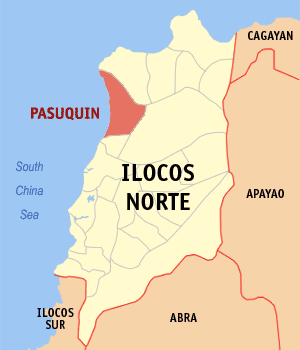
- Map of Ilocos Norte with Pasuquin highlighted
- Interactive map of Pasuquin
- Location within the Philippines
- Coordinates: 18°20′03″N 120°37′06″E
- Country: Philippines
- Region: Ilocos Region
- Province: Ilocos Norte
- District: 1st district
- Barangays: 33 (see Barangays)

Government
  - Type: Sangguniang Bayan
  - Mayor: Robert Aguinaldo
  - Vice Mayor: Oscar D. Aguinaldo
  - Representative: Ferdinand Alexander Araneta Marcos III
  - Municipal Council: Members: Dante G. Viernes; Elsie V. Bascao; Rachelle Leinaleigh A. Ferrer; Chino Earl V. Aguinaldo; Ferlind L. Dancel; Virginia S. Ibali; Armando M. Aguinaldo; Maria G. Calija
  - Electorate: 22,389 voters (2025)

Area
  - Total: 210.54 km^{2} (81.29 sq mi)
- Elevation: 60 m (200 ft)
- Highest elevation: 522 m (1,713 ft)
- Lowest elevation: 0 m (0 ft)

Population (2024 census)
  - Total: 30,521
  - Density: 144.97/km^{2} (375.46/sq mi)
  - Households: 7,501

Economy
  - Income class: 1st municipal income class
  - Poverty incidence: 4.15% (2023)
  - Revenue: ₱ 269 million (2024)
  - Assets: ₱ 947.8 million (2024)
  - Expenditure: ₱ 221.5 million (2024)
  - Liabilities: ₱ 335 million (2024)

Service provider
  - Electricity: Ilocos Norte Electric Cooperative (INEC)
- Time zone: UTC+8 (PST)
- ZIP code: 2917
- PSGC: 0102817000
- IDD : area code: +63 (0)77
- Native languages: Ilocano; Tagalog

Pasuquin, officially the Municipality of Pasuquin (Ilocano: Ili ti Pasuquin; Tagalog: Bayan ng Pasuquin), is a municipality in the province of Ilocos Norte, Philippines. According to the 2024 census, it has a population of 30,521 people.

== Geography ==
Pasuquin is situated 18.35 kilometres (11.40 mi) from the provincial capital Laoag, and 503.86 kilometres (313.08 mi) from the country's capital city of Manila.

=== Barangays ===
Pasuquin is politically subdivided into 33 barangays. Each barangay consists of puroks and some have sitios.

- Batuli (San Isidro)
- Binsang
- Caruan (Tulnagan)
- Carusikis
- Carusipan
- Dadaeman
- Darupidip
- Davila
- Dilanis
- Dilavo
- Estancia
- Naglicuan
- Nagsanga
- Nalvo (Cababaan/Nalvo)
- Ngabangab
- Pangil
- Poblacion 1
- Poblacion 2
- Poblacion 3
- Poblacion 4
- Pragata (Pragata-Bungro)
- Puyupuyan
- Salpad (Salpad-Calumbuyan)
- San Juan
- Santa Catalina
- Santa Matilde
- Sapat
- Sulbec
- Sulongan
- Surong
- Susugaen (Cababaan-Surgui)
- Tabungao
- Tadao

=== Climate ===
Climate data for Pasuquin
Month	Jan	Feb	Mar	Apr	May	Jun	Jul	Aug	Sep	Oct	Nov	Dec	Year
Mean daily maximum °C (°F)	26 (79)	28 (82)	30 (86)	32 (90)	31 (88)	31 (88)	30 (86)	30 (86)	30 (86)	29 (84)	28 (82)	26 (79)	29 (85)
Mean daily minimum °C (°F)	20 (68)	20 (68)	21 (70)	23 (73)	25 (77)	25 (77)	25 (77)	25 (77)	24 (75)	23 (73)	23 (73)	21 (70)	23 (73)
Average precipitation mm (inches)	55 (2.2)	41 (1.6)	37 (1.5)	41 (1.6)	184 (7.2)	215 (8.5)	261 (10.3)	256 (10.1)	245 (9.6)	216 (8.5)	142 (5.6)	129 (5.1)	1,822 (71.8)
Average rainy days	14.1	11.1	11.8	12.5	21.8	25.2	25.5	24.9	23.8	18.2	16.4	17.0	222.3
Source: Meteoblue

== Demographics ==
Population census of Pasuquin

Year	Pop.	±% p.a.
1903	6,785	—
1918	9,192	+2.04%
1939	10,065	+0.43%
1948	12,407	+2.35%
1960	12,262	−0.10%
1970	14,775	+1.88%
1975	16,258	+1.94%
1980	17,813	+1.84%

Year	Pop.	±% p.a.
1990	21,410	+1.86%
1995	23,027	+1.37%
2000	24,739	+1.55%
2007	26,307	+0.85%
2010	27,952	+2.23%
2015	28,980	+0.69%
2020	29,678	+0.50%
2024	30,521	+0.67%

Source: Philippine Statistics Authority

In the 2024 census, the population of Pasuquin was 30,521 people, with a density of 140 inhabitants per square kilometre or 360 inhabitants per square mile.

== Economy ==
Poverty incidence of Pasuquin (%)

Source: Philippine Statistics Authority

The main economic activities of the town are farming and fishing. Since the mid-1990s, the principal local crops were rice - mostly for home consumption - and garlic. Much of the latter is exported to Taiwan.

== Government ==
=== Local government ===
Pasuquin, belonging to the first congressional district of the province of Ilocos Norte, is governed by a mayor designated as its local chief executive and by a municipal council as its legislative body in accordance with the Local Government Code. The mayor, vice mayor, and the councilors are elected directly by the people through an election which is being held every three years.

=== Elected officials ===
Members of the Municipal Council (2025–2028)
Position	Name
Congressman	Ferdinand Alexander A. Marcos III
Mayor	Robert D. Aguinaldo
Vice-Mayor	Harry Kitt V. Aguinaldo
Councilors	Rodolfo Ian Benjamin G. Valdez II
Councilors	Chino Earl V. Aguinaldo
Councilors	Dante G. Viernes
Councilors	Romel S. Ranay
Councilors	Pedro Rex R. Aguinaldo
Councilors	John Stephen A. Alvarez
Councilors	Virginia S. Ibali
Councilors	Jan-Carlo V. Caldito

=== Municipal seal ===

- Shield, derived from the Provincial Seal of Ilocos Norte
- Rice, Fish and Garlic, represent the major sources of income of the municipality
- Salt Making, during off-season, people resort to salt making thereby increasing the income of the townspeople
- Feldspar Deposit, represent the town's big deposit of feldspar, a non-metallic mineral.

== Culture ==
- Poblacion 2 - "Rambac ti Daya".
- Poblacion 3 - "Ragragsak ti Laud"
- Barangay 5: Davila - "Dumadara Festival: Fluvial Parade"
- Semana Santa (Holy Week Celebration)
- May Flower Festival (where the Sunflower Organization started a worldwide known Pageantry)
- Town Fiesta in December from the 26th till the 30th. One of the highlights for the fiesta is the Inter-Barangay Basketball tournament and Inter-Agency Basketball tournament which include all groups of individual all over the town, also Balikbayan team included.
- Panagsana Festival
- Puyupuyan- Actually, the main attraction should be the old Spanish Tower located behind a grotto some fanatic people built. This fortress was built by the Spaniards as watchtower for some pirates roaming the ocean for their victims. The grotto they alleged to have some apparitions were never verified by either the government or the Church, yet some people believe that the grotto has healed some illness and brought some luck to fishermen. This depends on one's belief.

=== Panagsana Festival ===
It is the most known festival in Pasuquin. “Panagsana” is the Ilocano term used for this old-aged occupation. It means salt making, customarily done during summer and became the leading industry among the coastal folks in the municipality. The festival is annually celebrated on December during the town fiesta. Usually celebrated with street dances during the 29th of December, participated by the 8 clustered Barangays. Then, after, a showdown is held showcasing the history, legends, the beautiful Pasuquin, and the Traditional Salt Making.

=== The Sunflower Festival ===
An American film, Sunflowers (1996), directed by Shawn Hainsworth, an Independent U.S. Film Director, has made the Sunflower Festival internationally known. The film garnered critics recognition in the 1997 Chicago Gay and Lesbian Film Festival and other Film festivals in North America.

Sunflower members are also active in participation of the annual town fiesta in December, the Mayflower festivities and religious celebrations like Holy Week. Indeed, they may be gay but they are truly and undoubtedly assets to the community.

=== The Rambac ti Daya Festival ===
Poblacion 2 or better known as Dos, with almost 2,000 population annually celebrates the "RAMBAC ti DAYA" as a feast of thanksgiving to the Almighty Creator for bountiful harvests.. The unpredictable weather makes this event very surprising, as May is known to be the first month of the year with heavy rains..

Started in 1992 through a Municipal Ordinance, Poblacion Dos is known to be the pioneer barangay to come up with a barangay fiesta title-RAMBAC TI DAYA. This festivity culminates on the first two days of May, but usually preceded by an inter-zonal basketball tournament that runs for two to four weeks sponsored by the Sangguniang Kabataan..

One of the highlights of the festival is the community night, in which Barangay residents, local and foreign visitors gather together at the barangay plaza known as "Plaza Murit", for merry-making through community KTV, beer drinking, exchanging goodies, reuniting with good old folk, and simply enjoying and sharing abundant blessings.

The festival ends on the second day of May. A thanksgiving mass is offered in the first hour of the morning, followed by a motorists' parade downtown. After the motorcade, various Palarong Nayon are played by children and adult residents alike, where big prizes are at stake.

At night, the festival ends with a Sagalas/Santa Cruzan, a tribute to Queen Elena on her way to the Holy Cross. The Flores de Mayo parades young kids as they are dressed in their respective personas.

In the Flores De Mayo program, the Gawad Rambac ti Daya, Most Outstanding Anak ti Dos is awarded to the most deserving resident that made great impact and unsurmounted selfless contributions through civil service, social work, religious, and human rights advocacy, and youth and sports development.

=== The Dumadara Festival ===
An annual fluvial parade festival started by the Davileneos, particularly the Roman Catholic Parish of St. Francis of Assisi. Davila is a coastal barangay of Pasuquin, and their main harvest is dumadara (a certain fish). They associated the festival to the Blessed Virgin Mary, whom the Month of May is dedicated, as a thanksgiving for a bountiful fishing. Fisherfolks from Davila are made to decorate their bangkas (boats) for the fluvial parade. There are many activities hold also during the festival like boat race, and eating delectable grilled fish (Dumadara)with the guests.

=== Holy Week Celebration ===
The coastal town of Pasuquin celebrates its Holy Week with much religiosity and solemnity. The celebration starts on Palm Sunday (Domingo de Ramos) and ends on Easter Sunday (Domingo de Pascua). Each year, townspeople from all walks of life come together to celebrate the Most Holy Passion and Death of our Lord.

There are a total of 3 processions during Holy Week in St. James the Greater Parish, Pasuquin's Roman Catholic Church. The Holy Tuesday procession, better known as "Estacion General", Good Friday (the Holy Burial) and Easter Sunday (the "Encuentro" or "Sabet" in Ilocano). The processional images are enthroned in their respective carozzas with floral arrangements and elaborate lighting fixtures.

During Good Fridays, the "Stabat Mater" in Latin is sung by a long array of "cantoras" (townspeople) following the Santo Entierro (Dead Christ). Pasuquin is the only remaining town in Ilocos that practices this beautiful tradition/heritage handed by its forebears. The singing of the "Stabat Mater" in Pasuquin has been in existence for more than a century.

== Tourism ==
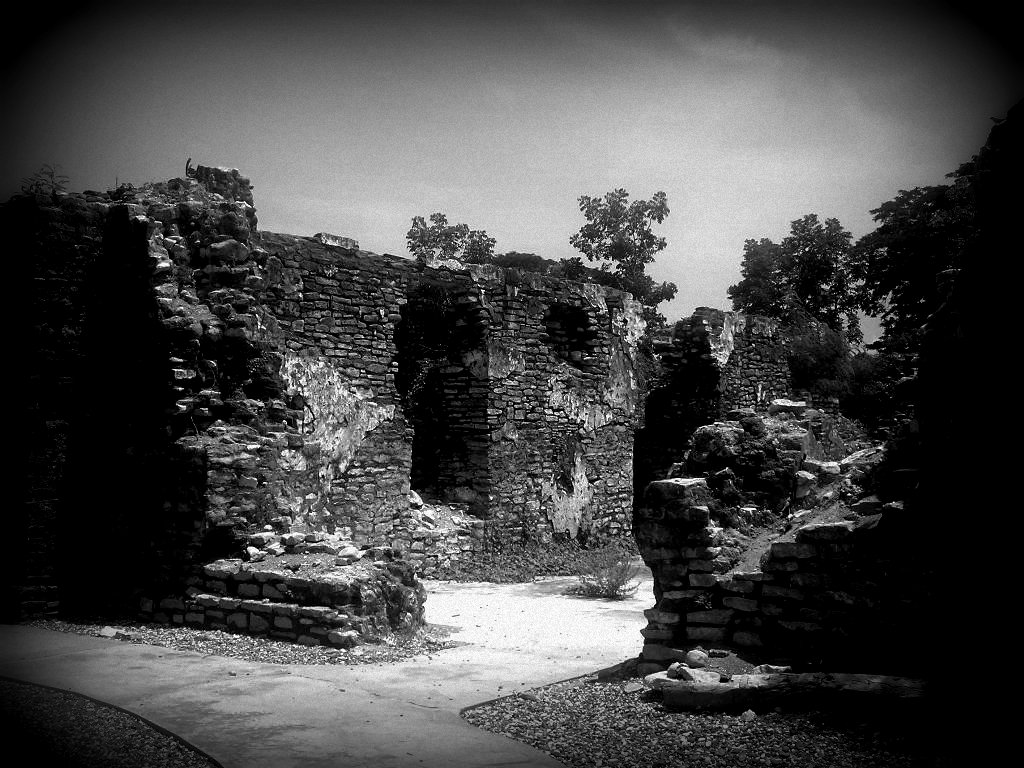
Ruins of Pasuquin's old Roman Catholic church

- Davila - Salt Capital; Also known for its bonsai production & artistry. Home of the "Dumadara Festival" organized by the Roman Catholic Parish of St. Francis of Assisi.
- Estancia- Summer Capital of Pasuquin. Known for its scenic Sexy Beach
- Naglicuan - Botanic Garden of Pasuquin
- Poblacion 2 - Sentinella Hills, Nagrebcan & Magararay Rice Fields, and the existence of the Old Roman Catholic Church Ruins. Home of the "Rambac ti Daya Festival"
- Poblacion 3 - Barangay "Biscocho", simply for making the biscuit. Home of the "Ragragsak ti Laud Festival"
- Puyupuyan - Known for its grotto and the apparition in the late 80s and early 90s.
- San Juan - Known for its summer getaway falls called "Calitungan"
- Santa Matilde - hunting; mango tree production
- Sapat - known for the PAF Airbase and the most restricted area in the town
- Sulbec - known for its Put-tot Siraong Picnic Venues
- Surong - known for its Luttuong falls
- Tadao - Houses the biggest dam in the municipality. Also good for picnics, trekking and hiking escapades.
- Susugaen - known for its own "Put-tot," a small lake, which many people visit because of its fresh, cold and clear water. Another attraction is the waterfall known as "Saypon" which used to serve the villagers with abundance of water along with streams and rivers. "Suso Beach" is also located here. Furthermore, "Villa Florentina Beach Resort" is also situated between Sitio Cababan and Barangay Nalvo at the South-Western part.

== Education ==
The Pasuguin Schools District Office governs all public and private elementary and high school within the municipality.

=== Primary and elementary schools ===
- Binsang Elementary School
- Cababaan Elementary School
- Caruan Elementary School
- Carusikis Elementary School
- Dadaeman Elementary School
- Davila Elementary School
- Dilanis Elementary School
- Dilavo Elementary School
- Gabaldon Elementary School
- Madalayap Elementary School
- Nagabungan Elementary School
- Naglicuan Elementary School
- Nagsanga Elementary School
- Pangil Elementary School
- Pasuquin Central Elementary School
- Puyupuyan Elementary School
- San Juan Elementary School
- San Isidro Primary School
- Saviour's Christian Academy
- Sta. Catalina Elementary School
- Sulbec Primary School
- Surong Primary School
- Tabungao Elementary School
- Tadao Elementary School
- United Church of Christ in the Philippines Learning Center

=== Secondary schools ===
- Davila National High School
- Pasuquin High School of Ilocos Norte
- Saint James Academy
- Cababaan Integrated School

=== Higher educational institution ===
- Ilocos Norte Agricultural College
