= Adams, Ilocos Norte =

Municipality in Ilocos Norte, Philippines

Adams
- Municipality
- Municipality of Adams
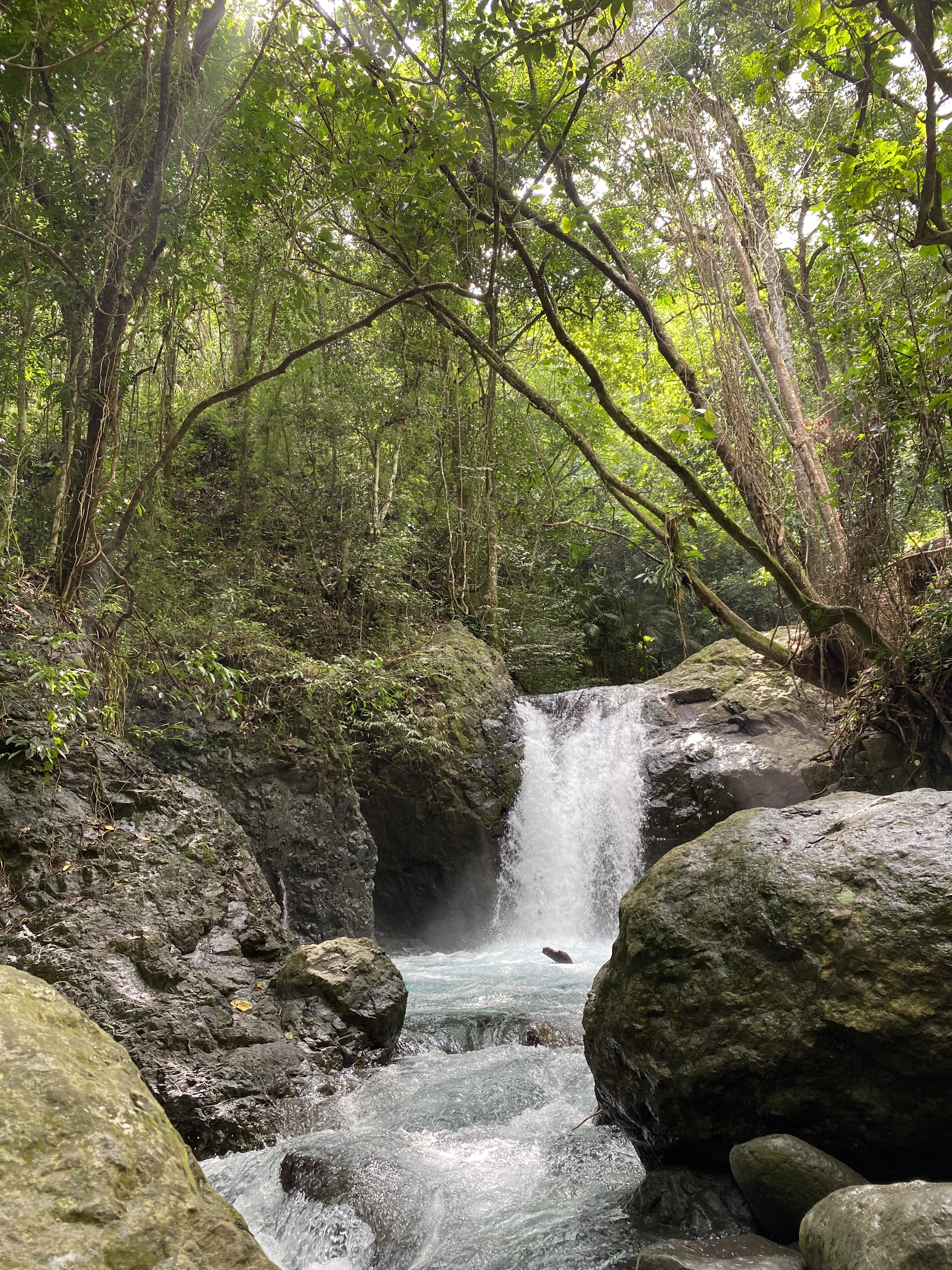
- Anat Falls

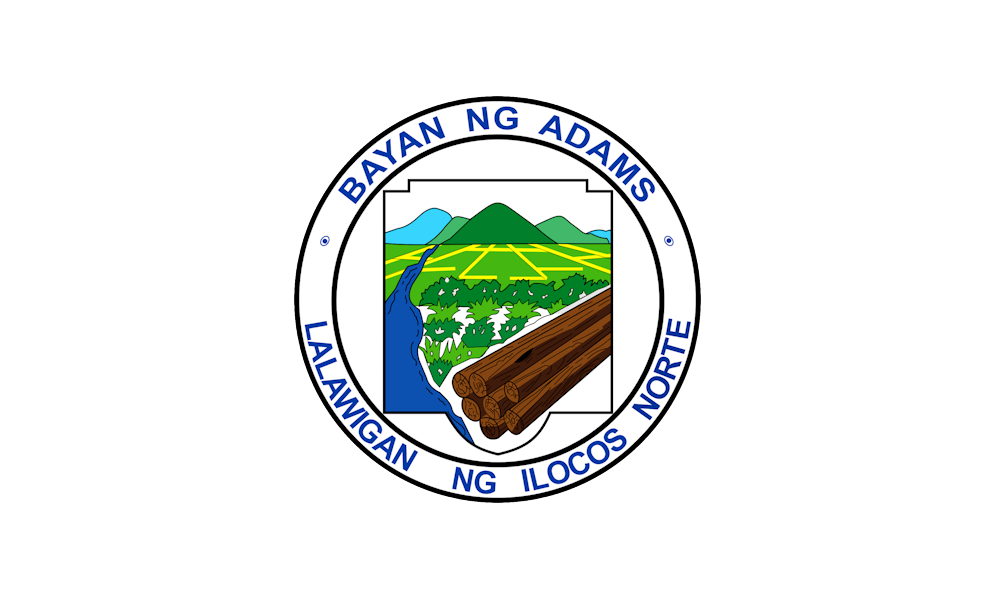
- Flag Seal

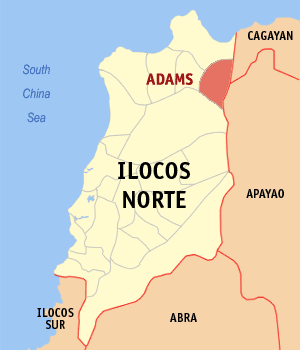
- Map of Ilocos Norte with Adams highlighted
- Interactive map of Adams
- Location within the Philippines
- Coordinates: 18°27′41″N 120°54′08″E
- Country: Philippines
- Region: Ilocos Region
- Province: Ilocos Norte
- District: 1st district
- Founded: May 16, 1983
- Barangays: 1 (see Barangays)

Government
  - Type: Sangguniang Bayan
  - Mayor: Rosalia D. Dupagen
  - Vice Mayor: Eddie Boy A. Suniga
  - Representative: Ferdinand Alexander Araneta Marcos III
  - Municipal Council: Members: Florence S. Andres; Thelma G. Dalog; Joffrey S. Ramoran; Ryan A. Andres; Homer M. Domingo; Pamela T. Domingsil; Bernard D. Cabradilla; Meynard S. Tawali
  - Electorate: 1,952 voters (2025)

Area
  - Total: 159.31 km^{2} (61.51 sq mi)
- Elevation: 559 m (1,834 ft)
- Highest elevation: 1,285 m (4,216 ft)
- Lowest elevation: 189 m (620 ft)

Population (2024 census)
  - Total: 2,279
  - Density: 14.31/km^{2} (37.05/sq mi)
  - Households: 516

Economy
  - Income class: 4th municipal income class
  - Poverty incidence: 10.21% (2023)
  - Revenue: ₱ 142.4 million (2024)
  - Assets: ₱ 335.4 million (2024)
  - Expenditure: ₱ 105 million (2024)
  - Liabilities: ₱ 26.8 million (2024)

Service provider
  - Electricity: Ilocos Norte Electric Cooperative (INEC)
- Time zone: UTC+8 (PST)
- ZIP code: 2922
- PSGC: 0102801000
- IDD : area code: +63 (0)77
- Native languages: Ilocano; Tagalog
- Website: www.adams.gov.ph

Adams, officially the Municipality of Adams (Ilocano: Ili ti Adams; Tagalog: Bayan ng Adams), is a single-barangay municipality in the province of Ilocos Norte, Philippines. According to the 2024 census, it has a population of 2,279 people.

== Geography ==
Adams is located in the northern part of the province. It is bordered by Pagudpud in the north; by Santa Praxedes, Cagayan in the northeast; by Calanasan, Apayao in the east; by Dumalneg in the west; and, by Vintar in the south.

Adams is situated 105.34 kilometres (65.46 mi) from the provincial capital Laoag, and 590.85 kilometres (367.14 mi) from the country's capital city of Manila.

The road leading to the municipality mainly from Barangay Pancian in Pagudpud used to be accessible only to motorcycles. Improvements thereto and new concrete bridges built by the provincial government of Ilocos Norte finally made the town accessible to all vehicles as of 2020. Moreover, there are plans to convert the provincial road into a national highway under the Department of Public Works and Highways.

Adams' villages are far from each other, with the farthest being Sitio Bucarot, located on the side of the mountain away from the población. It takes about three hours of hiking to get there.

Sitio Bucarot is still disputed territory between Adams and Calanasan, Apayao. Due to this, the place has government buildings from both municipalities.

=== Barangay ===
Adams was composed of only one barangay, and would thus be split into three. It consists of puroks and sitios.

- Adams (Adan)
- Bucarot
- Malasin

NOTE: In the early 2020s, both the House of Representatives and the Senate made efforts to split the single barangay into three. The northeastern sitios and puroks of Barangay Adams will be turned into Barangay Bucarot while the southern sitios such as Malaggao and Sinidangan will be reinstated as Barangay Malasin, thus the italicized barangays. The remainder of Barangay Adams will be renamed Adan.

=== Climate ===
Climate data for Adams, Ilocos Norte
Month	Jan	Feb	Mar	Apr	May	Jun	Jul	Aug	Sep	Oct	Nov	Dec	Year
Mean daily maximum °C (°F)	25 (77)	26 (79)	28 (82)	31 (88)	30 (86)	29 (84)	29 (84)	28 (82)	28 (82)	28 (82)	27 (81)	25 (77)	28 (82)
Mean daily minimum °C (°F)	18 (64)	19 (66)	20 (68)	22 (72)	23 (73)	24 (75)	24 (75)	23 (73)	23 (73)	22 (72)	21 (70)	20 (68)	22 (71)
Average precipitation mm (inches)	55 (2.2)	41 (1.6)	37 (1.5)	41 (1.6)	184 (7.2)	215 (8.5)	261 (10.3)	256 (10.1)	245 (9.6)	216 (8.5)	142 (5.6)	129 (5.1)	1,822 (71.8)
Average rainy days	14.1	11.1	11.8	12.5	21.8	25.2	25.5	24.9	23.8	18.2	16.4	17.0	222.3
Source: Meteoblue (modeled/calculated data, not measured locally)

== Demographics ==
Population census of Adams

Year	Pop.	±% p.a.
1939	209	—
1948	170	−2.27%
1960	414	+7.70%
1970	560	+3.06%
1975	863	+9.06%
1980	1,213	+7.04%
1990	1,119	−0.80%

Year	Pop.	±% p.a.
1995	1,287	+2.66%
2000	1,480	+3.04%
2007	1,522	+0.39%
2010	1,785	+5.97%
2015	1,792	+0.07%
2020	2,189	+4.30%
2024	2,279	+0.97%

Source: Philippine Statistics Authority

According to the 2024 census, the population of Adams was 2,279 people, with a density of 14 inhabitants per square kilometre or 36 inhabitants per square mile.

Adams' population is composed of a mixture of different ethnicities - Ilocanos, Yapayaos, Immallods, Kankanaeys, and Bago.

== Economy ==
Poverty incidence of Adams (%)

Source: Philippine Statistics Authority

Local products produced in Adams include:

- Saplid - local for soft broom
- Wine - just like Tapuey or rice wine
- Tropical wine - it depends on the season. Example of fruit wine is Bugnay Wine.

== Government ==
Adams, belonging to the first congressional district of the province of Ilocos Norte, is governed by a mayor designated as its local chief executive and by a municipal council as its legislative body in accordance with the Local Government Code. The mayor, vice mayor, and the councilors are elected directly by the people through an election which is being held every three years.

Members of the Municipal Council (2025–2028)

- Congressman: Ferdinand Alexander A. Marcos III
- Mayor: Homer M. Domingo
- Vice-Mayor: Eric T. Bawingan
- Councilors:
  - Ryan A. Andres
  - Meynard S. Tawali
  - Edward C. Tarnate
  - Jerry B. Baging
  - Maelyn D. Guinayen
  - Russell P. Dela Cruz
  - Thelma G. Dalog
  - Marcial B. Valencia

=== Municipal seal ===

The seal and its white background speaks of the people's simple way of living; it further suggests that their lifestyle is not blemished nor corrupted by civilization and modernization.

The shield was derived from the Provincial Seal of Ilocos Norte. The mountain range and the verdant field and river show the topography of the place as a potential source of wealth and livelihood and symbolizes the lofty ideals and the high hopes of the people for making Adams a place to live in.

== Culture ==
=== Cuisine ===
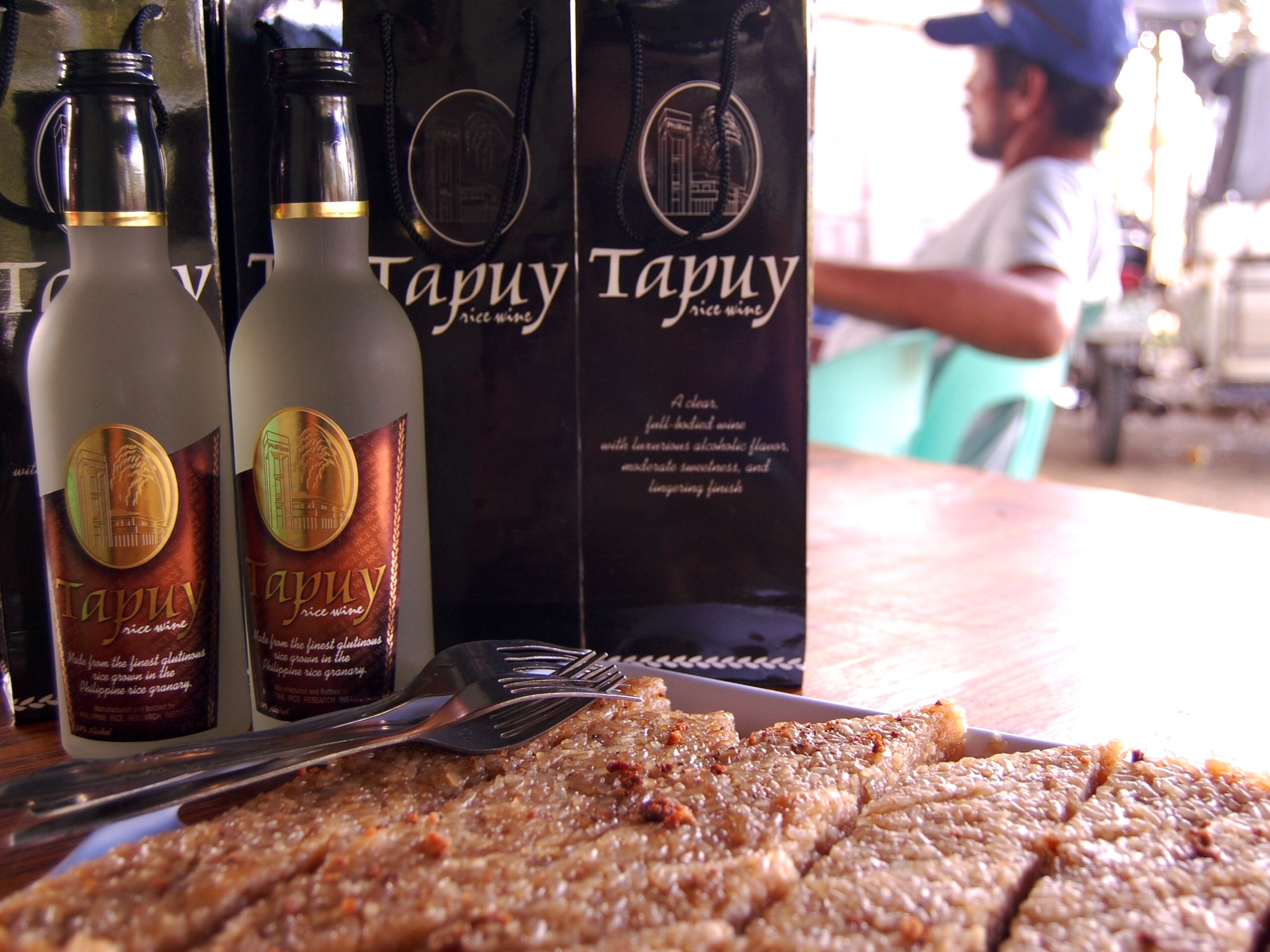
Tapuey

Local food include balbollosa (wild eggplant), ubog (rattan shoots), chicken with cardis, aba (gabi), kukutit (crushed crablets), fried frogs, kiwet (eel) and salads. There's also tapuey (rice wine) and Bugnay (fruit wine).

=== Festivals ===
- Tadek-Bagat Festival is celebrated on April 16–18 where it presents songs and dances of the different tribes of Adams.
- Foundation Day of Adams is celebrated annually on May 16.

== Education ==
Adams-Pagudpud School District Office governs all public schools in the municipality.

=== Primary and elementary schools ===
- Adams Central Elementary School
- Bucarot Primary School
- Malaggao Primary School

=== Secondary school ===
- Adams National High School
