= Banna, Ilocos Norte =

Municipality in Ilocos Norte, Philippines

Banna Espiritu
- Municipality
- Municipality of Banna
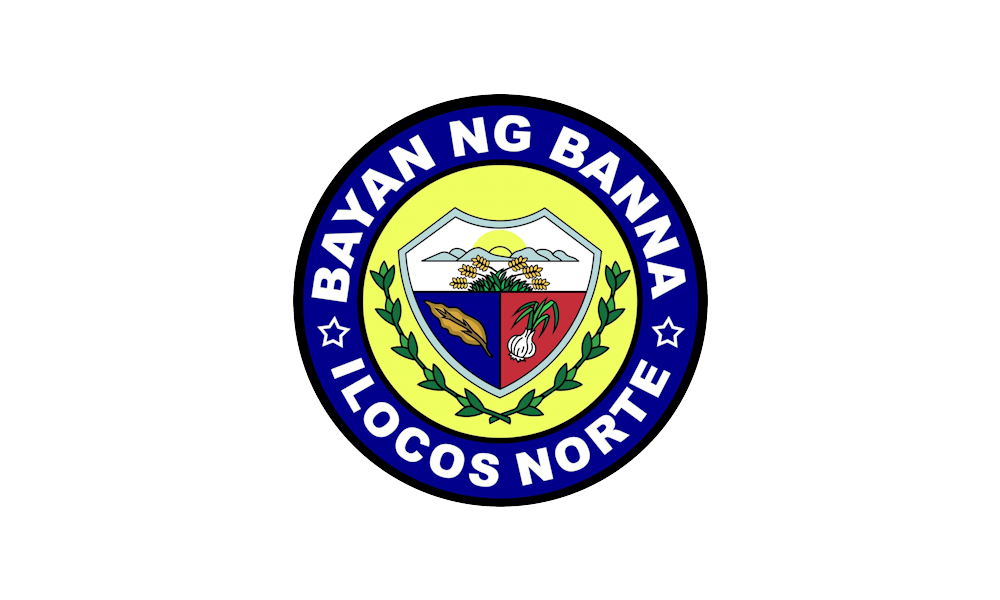
- Flag

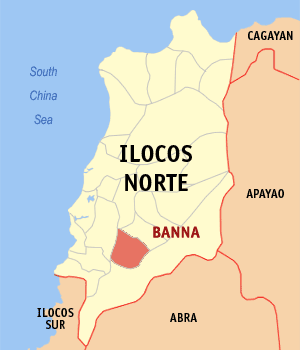
- Map of Ilocos Norte with Banna highlighted
- Interactive map of Banna
- Location within the Philippines
- Coordinates: 17°58′50″N 120°39′16″E
- Country: Philippines
- Region: Ilocos Region
- Province: Ilocos Norte
- District: 2nd district
- Founded: 1913
- Named for: Native chieftain named Bana
- Barangays: 20 (see Barangays)

Government
  - Type: Sangguniang Bayan
  - Mayor: Carlito A. Abadilla II
  - Vice Mayor: Mary Chrislyn C. Abadilla
  - Representative: Eugenio Angelo M. Barba
  - Municipal Council: Members: Herminio A. Bumanglag; Ruben G. Taroma; Adonis B. Manuel; Francisco A. Bactat; Nelson S. Lucas; Nelson C. Oalog; Johnny H. Gayya; Efren Santos B. Garcia
  - Electorate: 13,118 voters (2025)

Area
  - Total: 92.73 km^{2} (35.80 sq mi)
- Elevation: 115 m (377 ft)
- Highest elevation: 145 m (476 ft)
- Lowest elevation: 0 m (0 ft)

Population (2024 census)
  - Total: 19,363
  - Density: 208.8/km^{2} (540.8/sq mi)
  - Households: 4,899

Economy
  - Income class: 1st municipal income class
  - Poverty incidence: 5.51% (2023)
  - Revenue: ₱ 446.1 million (2024)
  - Assets: ₱ 1,308 million (2024)
  - Expenditure: ₱ 153.9 million (2024)
  - Liabilities: ₱ 165.4 million (2024)

Service provider
  - Electricity: Ilocos Norte Electric Cooperative (INEC)
- Time zone: UTC+8 (PST)
- ZIP code: 2908
- PSGC: 0102811000
- IDD : area code: +63 (0)77
- Native languages: Ilocano; Tagalog
- Website: www.banna.gov.ph

Banna, officially the Municipality of Banna (Ilocano: Ili ti Banna; Filipino: Bayan ng Banna), is a municipality in the province of Ilocos Norte, Philippines. According to the 2024 census, it has a population of 19,363 people.

== History ==
The word Banna was taken from the native chieftain named Bana. It was formerly known as Espiritu. The name changed under Sangguniang Panlalawigan (SP) Resolution No. 120–95 on March 20, 1995; ratified on March 10, 1996.

== Geography ==
Banna is situated 33.75 kilometres (20.97 mi) from the provincial capital Laoag, and 472.72 kilometres (293.73 mi) from the country's capital city of Manila.

=== Barangays ===
Banna is politically subdivided into 20 barangays. Each barangay consists of puroks and some have sitios.

- Balioeg
- Bangsar
- Barbarangay
- Binacag
- Bomitog
- Bugasi
- Caestebanan
- Caribquib
- Catagtaguen
- Crispina
- Hilario (Poblacion)
- Imelda
- Lorenzo (Poblacion)
- Macayepyep
- Marcos (Poblacion)
- Nagpatayan
- Sinamar
- Tabtabagan
- Valdez
- Valenciano (Poblacion)

=== Climate ===
Climate data for Banna, Ilocos Norte
Month	Jan	Feb	Mar	Apr	May	Jun	Jul	Aug	Sep	Oct	Nov	Dec	Year
Mean daily maximum °C (°F)	27 (81)	28 (82)	30 (86)	32 (90)	31 (88)	31 (88)	30 (86)	30 (86)	30 (86)	29 (84)	28 (82)	27 (81)	29 (85)
Mean daily minimum °C (°F)	19 (66)	20 (68)	21 (70)	23 (73)	24 (75)	25 (77)	25 (77)	25 (77)	24 (75)	23 (73)	22 (72)	21 (70)	23 (73)
Average precipitation mm (inches)	38 (1.5)	37 (1.5)	37 (1.5)	49 (1.9)	181 (7.1)	214 (8.4)	264 (10.4)	251 (9.9)	243 (9.6)	229 (9.0)	129 (5.1)	96 (3.8)	1,768 (69.7)
Average rainy days	11.6	10.7	12.4	15.2	22.6	25.0	26.1	24.9	24.3	19.2	16.4	15.4	223.8
Source: Meteoblue

== Demographics ==
Population census of Banna

Year	Pop.	±% p.a.
1903	4,015	—
1918	6,639	+3.41%
1939	7,608	+0.65%
1948	8,611	+1.39%
1960	9,972	+1.23%
1970	11,671	+1.58%
1975	12,434	+1.28%
1980	12,887	+0.72%

Year	Pop.	±% p.a.
1990	15,342	+1.76%
1995	15,975	+0.76%
2000	16,704	+0.96%
2007	18,161	+1.16%
2010	19,051	+1.76%
2015	19,438	+0.38%
2020	19,297	−0.15%
2024	19,363	+0.08%

Source: Philippine Statistics Authority

In the 2024 census, the population of Banna was 19,363 people, with a density of 210 inhabitants per square kilometre or 540 inhabitants per square mile.

== Economy ==
Poverty incidence of Banna

Source: Philippine Statistics Authority

Banna's economy focuses on agriculture as main source of livelihood. Banna's agricultural aspects include rice trading, livestock raising, and crop production.

== Government ==
=== Local government ===
Banna is part of the second congressional district of the province of Ilocos Norte. It is governed by a mayor designated as its local chief executive and by a municipal council as its legislative body in accordance with the Local Government Code. The mayor, vice mayor, and councilors are elected directly by the people through an election that is held every three years.

=== Elected officials ===
Members of the Municipal Council (2025–2028)
Position	Name
Congressman	Eugenio Angelo M. Barba
Mayor	Mary Chrislyn C. Abadilla
Vice-Mayor	Carlito A. Abadilla II
Councilors	Paul Vincent C. Abadilla
Councilors	Michael M. Lucas
Councilors	Neil Jansen M. Aurelio
Councilors	Florendo S. Macasio Jr.
Councilors	Marlo C. Ramos
Councilors	Jaime C. Maximo
Councilors	Lemuel R. Lucas
Councilors	Efren Santos B. Garcia

== Education ==
The Banna (Espiritu) Schools District Office governs all public and private elementary and high schools within the municipality.

=== Primary and elementary schools ===
- Bangsar Elementary School
- Banna Central Elementary School
- Banna Church of Christ Disciples Learning Center
- Barbarangay Elementary School
- Bomitog Elementary School
- Bugasi Elementary School
- Caestebanan Elementary School
- Caribquib Elementary School
- Catagtaguen Elementary School
- Crispina Elementary School
- Imelda Elementary School
- Lading Elementary School
- Macayepyep Elementary School
- Nagpatayan Elementary School
- Quiaoit Memorial Elementary School
- Sinamar Elementary School
- Tabtabagan Elementary School
- Valdez Elementary School

=== Secondary schools ===
- Banna Academy
- Banna National High School
- Caestebanan National High School
- Caribquib National High School
- Catagtaguen National High School

== Notable personalities ==
- Rolando Abadilla, Filipino politician, and military officer
- Linabelle Villarica, Filipino politician
