= Pinili =

Municipality in Ilocos Norte, Philippines

- Municipality
- Municipality of Pinili
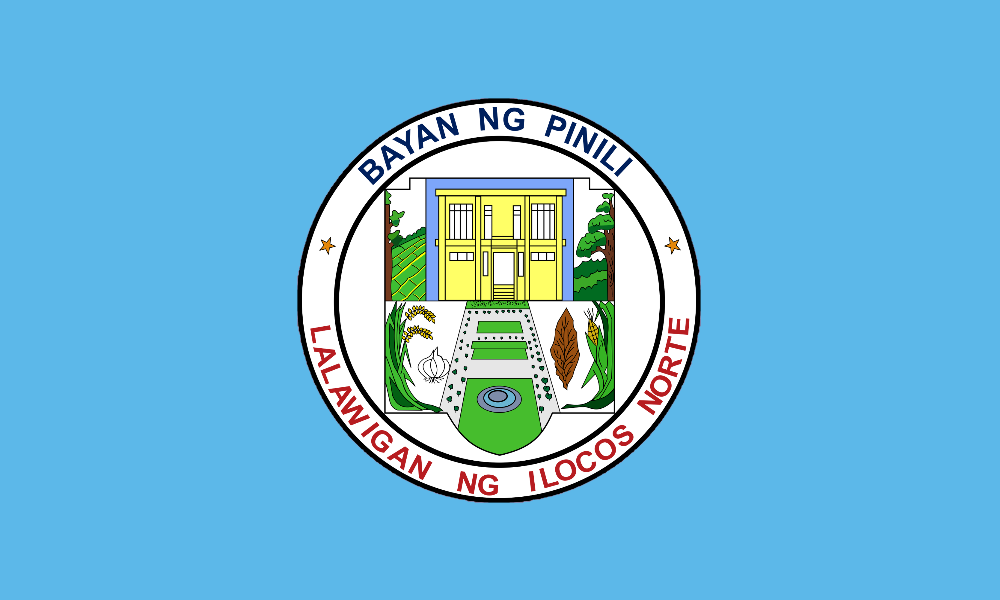
- Flag Seal

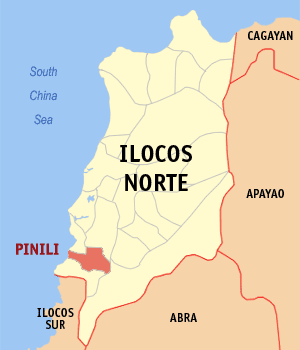
- Map of Ilocos Norte with Pinili highlighted
- Interactive map of Pinili
- Location within the Philippines
- Coordinates: 17°57′14″N 120°31′37″E
- Country: Philippines
- Region: Ilocos Region
- Province: Ilocos Norte
- District: 2nd district
- Barangays: 25 (see Barangays)

Government
  - Type: Sangguniang Bayan
  - Mayor: Rommel T. Labasan
  - Vice Mayor: Maynard Francis R. Bumanglag
  - Representative: Eugenio Angelo M. Barba
  - Municipal Council: Members: Mel Lawrence O. Coloma; Rey A. Gabur; Julius P. Fernandez; Amor M. Bagarino; Jerry P. Fernandez; Louie Joy D. Pagdilao; Anunciacion D. Pagdilao; Reizel A. Cabie
  - Electorate: 12,733 voters (2025)

Area
  - Total: 89.48 km^{2} (34.55 sq mi)
- Elevation: 70 m (230 ft)
- Highest elevation: 415 m (1,362 ft)
- Lowest elevation: 0 m (0 ft)

Population (2024 census)
  - Total: 17,705
  - Density: 197.9/km^{2} (512.5/sq mi)
  - Households: 4,374

Economy
  - Income class: 1st municipal income class
  - Poverty incidence: 4.57% (2023)
  - Revenue: ₱ 1,058 million (2024)
  - Assets: ₱ 2,533 million (2024)
  - Expenditure: ₱ 223.1 million (2024)
  - Liabilities: ₱ 185 million (2024)

Service provider
  - Electricity: Ilocos Norte Electric Cooperative (INEC)
- Time zone: UTC+8 (PST)
- ZIP code: 2905
- PSGC: 0102819000
- IDD : area code: +63 (0)77
- Native languages: Ilocano; Tagalog

Pinili, officially the Municipality of Pinili (Ilocano: Ili ti Pinili; Tagalog: Bayan ng Pinili), is a municipality in the province of Ilocos Norte, Philippines. According to the 2024 census, it has a population of 17,705 people.

== History ==
Pinili was once a forested hilly part of the towns of Paoay, Badoc, and Batac. Pinili is both a Tagalog and Ilokano word for 'chosen'.

The then vicar of the Philippine Revolution, Gregorio Aglipay, and his Sandataan guerrilla chose the thickly forested hilly area of Pinili as the location for their last stand against the advancing American troops tasked to subdue President Emilio Aguinaldo and his followers. It is said that it was Aglipay himself who selected the name Pinili, but in fact it was the area's elders themselves who chose to unite and be one municipality after the Philippine–American War for unity and closer cooperation.

Pinili was made an independent town on January 20, 1920, after then Governor General Francis Burton Harrison signed Executive Order No. 92 on December 20, 1919. Felipe Arcangel was appointed by townmate Aglipay as the first town chief executive.

During the Japanese occupation in the 1940s, bolomen from the town, headed by Mariano Gamatero, with three subordinate officers ranked major, Agustin Cabie, Cecilio Vermudez, and Florencio Tacub, fought guerrilla warfare using tactics that included ambuscades, sabotage, raids, petty warfare, hit-and-run tactics, and mobility, to fight the larger-but-less-mobile Japanese troops.

Kul-labeng Historical Site, where Gregorio Aglipay and other priests made the decision to separate from the Roman Catholic Church in 1902

On January 1, 2020, Pinili's history was re-enacted at the town square after a Thanksgiving Mass in Kullabeng, the site where Aglipay used to meet up with elders of the area before it became a town. It was also there where Aglipay, then no longer a Catholic, celebrated what was to be called the first Aglipayan Mass.

== Geography ==
Pinili is situated 38.52 kilometres (23.94 mi) from the provincial capital Laoag, and 453.15 kilometres (281.57 mi) from the country's capital city of Manila.

=== Barangays ===
Pinili is politically subdivided into 25 barangays. Each barangay consists of puroks and some have sitios.

- Aglipay
- Apatut-Lubong
- Badio
- Barbar
- Buanga
- Bulbulala
- Bungro
- Cabaroan
- Capangdanan
- Dalayap
- Darat
- Gulpeng
- Liliputen
- Lumbaan-Bicbica
- Nagtrigoan
- Pagdilao (Poblacion)
- Pugaoan
- Puritac
- Puzol
- Sacritan
- Salanap
- Santo Tomas
- Tartarabang
- Upon
- Valbuena (Poblacion)

=== Climate ===
Climate data for Pinili, Ilocos Norte
Month	Jan	Feb	Mar	Apr	May	Jun	Jul	Aug	Sep	Oct	Nov	Dec	Year
Mean daily maximum °C (°F)	29 (84)	31 (88)	32 (90)	34 (93)	32 (90)	31 (88)	30 (86)	30 (86)	30 (86)	30 (86)	30 (86)	29 (84)	31 (87)
Mean daily minimum °C (°F)	18 (64)	19 (66)	20 (68)	23 (73)	24 (75)	24 (75)	24 (75)	24 (75)	24 (75)	22 (72)	21 (70)	19 (66)	22 (71)
Average precipitation mm (inches)	9 (0.4)	11 (0.4)	13 (0.5)	23 (0.9)	92 (3.6)	122 (4.8)	153 (6.0)	137 (5.4)	139 (5.5)	141 (5.6)	42 (1.7)	14 (0.6)	896 (35.4)
Average rainy days	4.6	4.0	6.2	9.1	19.5	23.2	24.0	22.5	21.5	15.2	10.5	6.0	166.3
Source: Meteoblue

== Demographics ==
Population census of Pinili
Year	Pop.	±% p.a.
1939	7,890	—
1948	8,318	+0.59%
1960	10,472	+1.94%
1970	12,211	+1.55%
1975	12,741	+0.86%
1980	13,521	+1.20%
1990	14,950	+1.01%
1995	14,817	−0.17%
2000	15,903	+1.53%
2007	16,185	+0.24%
2010	16,732	+1.22%
2015	17,300	+0.64%
2020	17,626	+0.39%
2024	17,705	+0.11%
Source: Philippine Statistics Authority

In the 2024 census, the population of Pinili was 17,705 people, with a density of 200 inhabitants per square kilometre or 520 inhabitants per square mile.

== Economy ==
Poverty incidence of Pinili (%)

Source: Philippine Statistics Authority

Pinili is one of the leading producers of tobacco in Ilocos Norte. Local farmers grow rice, corn, garlic, and onions.

== Government ==
=== Local government ===
Pinili, belonging to the second congressional district of the province of Ilocos Norte, is governed by a mayor designated as its local chief executive and by a municipal council as its legislative body in accordance with the Local Government Code. The mayor, vice mayor, and the councilors are elected directly by the people through an election which is being held every three years.

=== Elected officials ===
Members of the Municipal Council (2025–2028)
Position	Name
Congressman	Eugenio Angelo M. Barba
Mayor	Rommel T. Labasan
Vice-Mayor	Maynard Francis R. Bumanglag
Councilors	Jerome RJ T. Labasan
Councilors	Allen M. Bumanglag
Councilors	Jerry P. Fernandez
Councilors	Rey A. Gabur
Councilors	Reizel A. Cabie
Councilors	Ericson M. Lumbo
Councilors	Valeriano V. Tugas Jr.
Councilors	Anunciacion D. Pagdilao

== Education ==
The Pinili Schools District Office governs all public and private elementary and high schools within the municipality.

=== Primary and elementary schools ===
- Badio Elementary School
- Barbar Elementary School
- Bicbica Primary School
- Buanga Elementary School
- Bulbulala Elementary School
- Cabaroan Elementary School
- Darat Elementary School
- Don Mariano Marcos Mem. Sch.
- Godogod Elementary School
- Gulpeng Primary School
- Liliputen Elementary School
- Nagtrigoan Elementary School
- Pugaoan-Bungro Elementary School
- Puritac-Dalayap Elementary School
- Puzol Elementary School
- Salanap Elementary School
- Sto. Tomas Elementary School
- Upon Elementary School

=== Secondary schools ===
- Pinili National High School
- Sacritan Integrated School
