= Marcos, Ilocos Norte =

Municipality in Ilocos Norte, Philippines

Marcos
- Municipality
- Municipality of Marcos
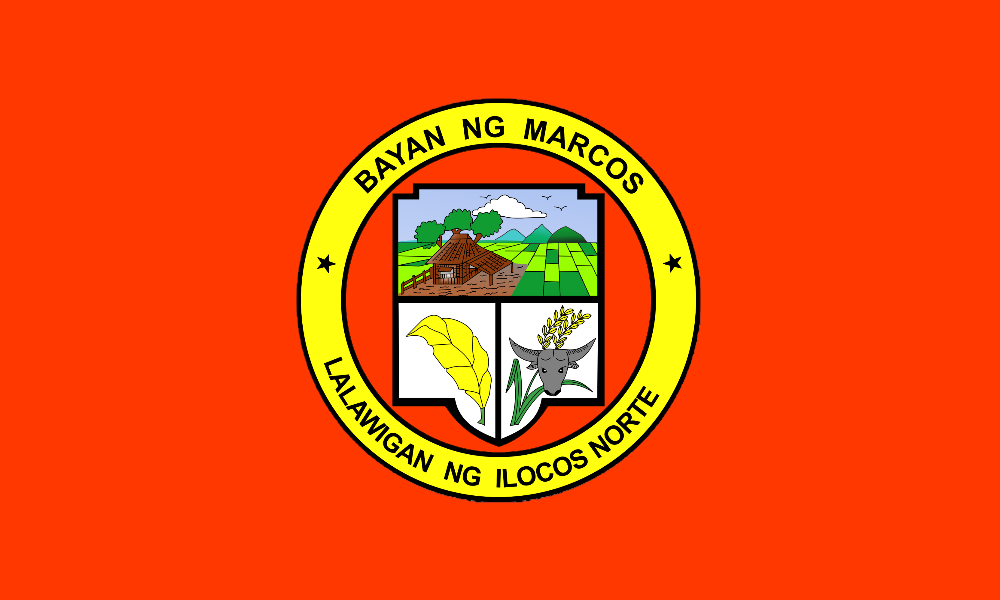
- Flag Seal

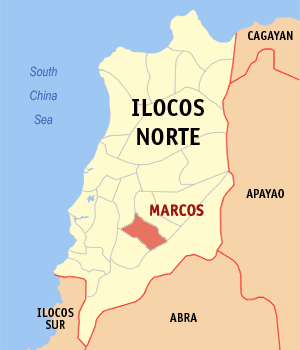
- Map of Ilocos Norte with Marcos highlighted
- Interactive map of Marcos
- Location within the Philippines
- Coordinates: 18°02′40″N 120°40′43″E
- Country: Philippines
- Region: Ilocos Region
- Province: Ilocos Norte
- District: 2nd district
- Founded: June 22, 1963
- Named for: Mariano Marcos
- Barangays: 13 (see Barangays)

Government
  - Type: Sangguniang Bayan
  - Mayor: Antonio V. Mariano
  - Vice Mayor: Hilario B. Lorenzo
  - Representative: Eugenio Angelo M. Barba
  - Municipal Council: Members: Noel R. Calaoagan; Marietta G. Casco; Eduard T. Mendoza; James C. Gacula; Sherwin R. Tamayo; Richard M. Nuval; Helen B. Abrigado; Telwin B. Tapaoan
  - Electorate: 12,974 voters (2025)

Area
  - Total: 72.77 km^{2} (28.10 sq mi)
- Elevation: 82 m (269 ft)
- Highest elevation: 376 m (1,234 ft)
- Lowest elevation: 27 m (89 ft)

Population (2024 census)
  - Total: 18,105
  - Density: 248.8/km^{2} (644.4/sq mi)
  - Households: 4,675

Economy
  - Income class: 2nd municipal income class
  - Poverty incidence: 4.24% (2023)
  - Revenue: ₱ 383 million (2024)
  - Assets: ₱ 1,001 million (2024)
  - Expenditure: ₱ 218.3 million (2024)
  - Liabilities: ₱ 183.6 million (2024)

Service provider
  - Electricity: Ilocos Norte Electric Cooperative (INEC)
- Time zone: UTC+8 (PST)
- ZIP code: 2907
- PSGC: 0102813000
- IDD : area code: +63 (0)77
- Native languages: Ilocano; Tagalog

Marcos, officially the Municipality of Marcos (Ilocano: Ili ti Marcos; Filipino: Bayan ng Marcos), is a municipality in the province of Ilocos Norte, Philippines. According to the 2024 census, it has a population of 18,105 people.

Formerly a part of Dingras, Ilocos Norte, Marcos was established on June 22, 1963 by virtue of Republic Act No. 3753. The town's namesake is Don Mariano Marcos, the father of former President Ferdinand Marcos and the grandfather of current president Bongbong Marcos.

== History ==
=== Political violence ===
The small town of Marcos has seen multiple violent political attacks over the past years.

On February 4, 2013, Mayor Salvador Pillos survived an attack by two motorcycle-riding gunmen who shot him while he was inspecting a construction project.

On the afternoon of February 23, 2013, Barangay Fortuna chairman Alfredo Arce was gunned down by a gunman on the back of a motorcycle. Arce was shot in the chest and died on the spot.

On the evening of April 4, 2017, Vice Mayor Jessie Ermitanio survived an ambush and shootout while driving through an unpopulated section of the road between the Padsan River and the Daquioag Elementary School. The vice mayor's driver, Lucky Jesrel Rumbaoa, died from the gunshots; and, his security escort - Ricky Florendo - and Municipal Council staffer, Edralin Arellano, were injured.

On the morning of June 3, 2017, Mayor Arsenio Agustin was shot in the head and died on the spot after inspecting a project in Barangay Mabuti. Municipal employee Rusmar Valencia was also shot in the back. The mayor's bodyguards fired back at the gunman but the assailant evaded capture.

Mayor Agustin had been receiving death threats prior to the shooting and the vice mayor had requested a police escort after he believed he was being stalked when he served as acting mayor in October 2016.

== Geography ==
Marcos is situated 26.27 kilometres (16.32 mi) from the provincial capital Laoag, and 480.63 kilometres (298.65 mi) from the country's capital city of Manila.

=== Barangays ===
Marcos is politically subdivided into 13 barangays. Each barangay consists of puroks and some have sitios.

It is 29 kilometres (18 mi) from Laoag, 510 kilometres (320 mi) from Manila, 79 kilometres (49 mi) from Bangued, and 28 kilometres (17 mi) from Batac.

- Cacafean
- Daquioag
- Elizabeth (Culao)
- Escoda
- Ferdinand
- Fortuna
- Imelda (Capariaan)
- Lydia (Poblacion)
- Mabuti
- Pacifico (Agunit)
- Tabucbuc (Ragas)
- Santiago
- Valdez

There were 4 barangays named after Mariano Marcos' four children:

- Ferdinand Marcos (1917-1989), who became president of the Philippines (1965–1986)
- Pacifico Marcos (1919-), a physician
- Elizabeth Marcos-Keon (1921-1986), former Ilocos Norte governor (1971-1983) and mother of Michael Marcos Keon
- Fortuna Marcos-Barba (1931-2018)

=== Climate ===
Climate data for Marcos, Ilocos Norte
Month	Jan	Feb	Mar	Apr	May	Jun	Jul	Aug	Sep	Oct	Nov	Dec	Year
Mean daily maximum °C (°F)	27 (81)	28 (82)	30 (86)	32 (90)	31 (88)	31 (88)	30 (86)	30 (86)	30 (86)	29 (84)	29 (84)	27 (81)	30 (85)
Mean daily minimum °C (°F)	20 (68)	20 (68)	21 (70)	23 (73)	25 (77)	25 (77)	25 (77)	25 (77)	24 (75)	23 (73)	22 (72)	21 (70)	23 (73)
Average precipitation mm (inches)	38 (1.5)	37 (1.5)	37 (1.5)	49 (1.9)	181 (7.1)	214 (8.4)	264 (10.4)	251 (9.9)	243 (9.6)	229 (9.0)	129 (5.1)	96 (3.8)	1,768 (69.7)
Average rainy days	11.6	10.7	12.4	15.2	22.6	25.0	26.1	24.9	24.3	19.2	16.4	15.4	223.8
Source: Meteoblue

== Demographics ==
Population census of Marcos
Year	Pop.	±% p.a.
1970	9,406	—
1975	9,804	+0.83%
1980	10,306	+1.00%
1990	12,990	+2.34%
1995	13,688	+0.99%
2000	15,154	+2.21%
2007	16,711	+1.36%
2010	16,984	+0.59%
2015	17,777	+0.87%
2020	18,010	+0.27%
2024	18,105	+0.13%
Source: Philippine Statistics Authority

In the 2024 census, the population of Marcos was 18,105 people, with a density of 250 inhabitants per square kilometre or 650 inhabitants per square mile.

== Economy ==
Poverty incidence of Marcos (%)

Source: Philippine Statistics Authority

The municipality of Marcos is an agricultural town. Rice and corn serve as the main agricultural crops of Marcos.

== Government ==
=== Local government ===
Marcos, belonging to the second congressional district of the province of Ilocos Norte, is governed by a mayor designated as its local chief executive and by a municipal council as its legislative body in accordance with the Local Government Code. The mayor, vice mayor, and the councilors are elected directly by the people through an election which is being held every three years.

=== Elected officials ===
Members of the Municipal Council (2025–2028)
Position	Name
Congressman	Eugenio Angelo M. Barba
Mayor	Antonio V. Mariano
Vice-Mayor	Rhonel Allan M. Coloma
Councilors	Norman L. Calaoagan
Councilors	Eduard T. Mendoza
Councilors	Telwin B. Tapaoan
Councilors	James C. Gacula
Councilors	Hilario B. Lorenzo
Councilors	Janice A. Dela Cruz
Councilors	Julius J. Casco
Councilors	Ranel B. Magno

== Education ==
The Marcos-Nueva Era Schools District Office governs all private and public schools within the municipalities of Marcos, and Nueva Era.

=== Primary and elementary schools ===
- Biding Elementary School
- Cacafean Elementary School
- Elizabeth Elementary School
- Escoda Elementary School
- F. Daquioag Memorial Elementary School
- Ferdinand Elementary School
- Fortuna Elementary School
- Imelda Elementary School
- Kids' Kollege, Marcos I. Norte
- Mabuti Elementary School
- Marcos Central Elementary School
- Pacifico Elementary School
- Santiago Elementary School
- Tabucbuc Elementary School

=== Secondary schools ===
- Marcos National High School
- Marcos National High School (Agunit Campus)
- Marcos National High School (Santiago Campus)
