= Nueva Era, Ilocos Norte =

Municipality in Ilocos Norte, Philippines

Nueva Era
- Municipality
- Municipality of Nueva Era
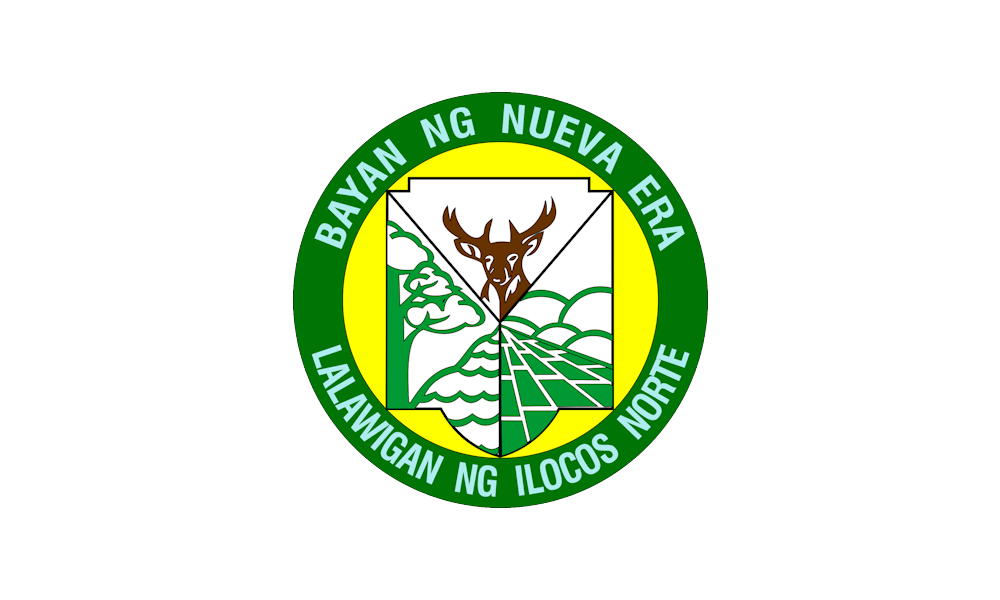
- Flag Seal
- Etymology: lit. "New Era"
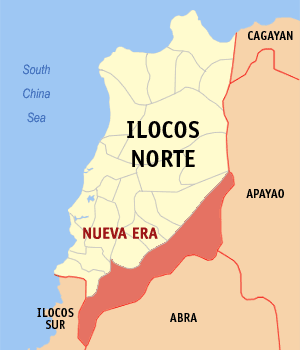
- Map of Ilocos Norte with Nueva Era highlighted
- Interactive map of Nueva Era
- Location within the Philippines
- Coordinates: 17°55′N 120°40′E
- Country: Philippines
- Region: Ilocos Region
- Province: Ilocos Norte
- District: 2nd district
- Barangays: 11 (see Barangays)

Government
  - Type: Sangguniang Bayan
  - Mayor: Aldrin R. Garvida
  - Vice Mayor: Caroline A. Garvida
  - Representative: Eugenio Angelo M. Barba
  - Municipal Council: Members: Catherine A. Naira; Osias O. Bueno; Jerry D. Alejandro; Benabel A. Lalugan; Roger O. Arzadon; Agrifina T. Dumlao; Petronio H. Riquelman Jr.; Edwin B. Yagin
  - Electorate: 6,261 voters (2025)

Area
  - Total: 515.02 km^{2} (198.85 sq mi)
- Elevation: 220 m (720 ft)
- Highest elevation: 841 m (2,759 ft)
- Lowest elevation: 63 m (207 ft)

Population (2024 census)
  - Total: 13,305
  - Density: 25.834/km^{2} (66.910/sq mi)
  - Households: 2,989

Economy
  - Income class: 1st municipal income class
  - Poverty incidence: 6.51% (2023)
  - Revenue: ₱ 337.6 million (2024)
  - Assets: ₱ 1,253 million (2024)
  - Expenditure: ₱ 173.2 million (2024)
  - Liabilities: ₱ 177.5 million (2024)

Service provider
  - Electricity: Ilocos Norte Electric Cooperative (INEC)
- Time zone: UTC+8 (PST)
- ZIP code: 2909
- PSGC: 0102814000
- IDD : area code: +63 (0)77
- Native languages: Ilocano; Tagalog

Nueva Era, officially the Municipality of Nueva Era (Ilocano: Ili ti Nueva Era; Filipino: Bayan ng Nueva Era), is a municipality in the province of Ilocos Norte, Philippines. According to the 2024 census, it has a population of 13,305 people.

== Geography ==
Nueva Era is situated 41.58 kilometres (25.84 mi) from the provincial capital Laoag, and 471.60 kilometres (293.04 mi) from the country's capital city of Manila.

=== Barangays ===
Nueva Era is politically subdivided into 11 barangays. Each barangay consists of puroks and some have sitios.

- Acnam
- Barangobong
- Barikir
- Bugayong
- Cabittauran
- Caray
- Garnaden
- Naguillan (Pagpag-ong)
- Poblacion
- Santo Niño
- Uguis

=== Climate ===
Climate data for Nueva Era, Ilocos Norte
Month	Jan	Feb	Mar	Apr	May	Jun	Jul	Aug	Sep	Oct	Nov	Dec	Year
Mean daily maximum °C (°F)	26 (79)	28 (82)	30 (86)	31 (88)	31 (88)	30 (86)	30 (86)	29 (84)	29 (84)	29 (84)	28 (82)	26 (79)	29 (84)
Mean daily minimum °C (°F)	19 (66)	19 (66)	21 (70)	23 (73)	24 (75)	25 (77)	24 (75)	24 (75)	24 (75)	22 (72)	22 (72)	20 (68)	22 (72)
Average precipitation mm (inches)	38 (1.5)	37 (1.5)	37 (1.5)	49 (1.9)	181 (7.1)	214 (8.4)	264 (10.4)	251 (9.9)	243 (9.6)	229 (9.0)	129 (5.1)	96 (3.8)	1,768 (69.7)
Average rainy days	11.6	10.7	12.4	15.2	22.6	25.0	26.1	24.9	24.3	19.2	16.4	15.4	223.8
Source: Meteoblue

== Demographics ==
Population census of Nueva Era
Year	Pop.	±% p.a.
1918	907	—
1939	2,059	+3.98%
1948	1,971	−0.48%
1960	2,803	+2.98%
1970	3,413	+1.99%
1975	3,608	+1.12%
1980	3,927	+1.71%
1990	5,238	+2.92%
1995	6,224	+3.28%
2000	6,095	−0.45%
2007	7,475	+2.85%
2010	7,837	+1.74%
2015	9,506	+3.75%
2020	11,968	+4.97%
2024	13,305	+2.58%
Source: Philippine Statistics Authority

In the 2024 census, the population of Nueva Era was 13,305 people, with a density of 26 inhabitants per square kilometre or 67 inhabitants per square mile.

== Economy ==
Poverty incidence of Nueva Era (%)

Source: Philippine Statistics Authority

Nueva Era's economy relies on agriculture. Nueva Era produces rice, corn, root crops, vegetables, and mung beans. Nueva Era is also known for its bamboo and bolo plant craft industry.

== Government ==
=== Local government ===
Nueva Era is part of the second congressional district of the province of Ilocos Norte. It is governed by a mayor designated as its local chief executive and by a municipal council as its legislative body in accordance with the Local Government Code. The mayor, vice mayor, and the councilors are elected directly by the people through an election which is being held every three years.

=== Elected officials ===
Members of the Municipal Council (2025–2028)
Position	Name
Congressman	Eugenio Angelo M. Barba
Mayor	Aldrin R. Garvida
Vice-Mayor	Caroline A. Garvida
Councilors	Catherine A. Naira
Councilors	Redentor B. Valera
Councilors	Joybel T. Bueno
Councilors	Benabel A. Lalugan
Councilors	Elmer B. Azurin
Councilors	Fernando B. Balagso
Councilors	Edwin B. Yagin
Councilors	Arnel N. Calaycay

== Education ==
The Marcos-Nueva Era Schools District Office governs all private and public schools within the municipalities of Marcos, and Nueva Era.

=== Primary and elementary schools ===
- Acnam-Caray Elementary School
- Barangobong Elementary School
- Barikir Elementary School
- Bugayong Elementary School
- Cabittauran Elementary School
- Garnaden Elementary School
- Naguilian Elementary School
- Nueva Era Central Elementary School
- Santo Nino Elementary School

=== Secondary schools ===
- Adriano P. Arzadon National High School
- Nueva Era National High School
- Uguis Integrated School
