= Solsona, Ilocos Norte =

Municipality in Ilocos Norte, Philippines

Solsona
- Municipality
- Municipality of Solsona
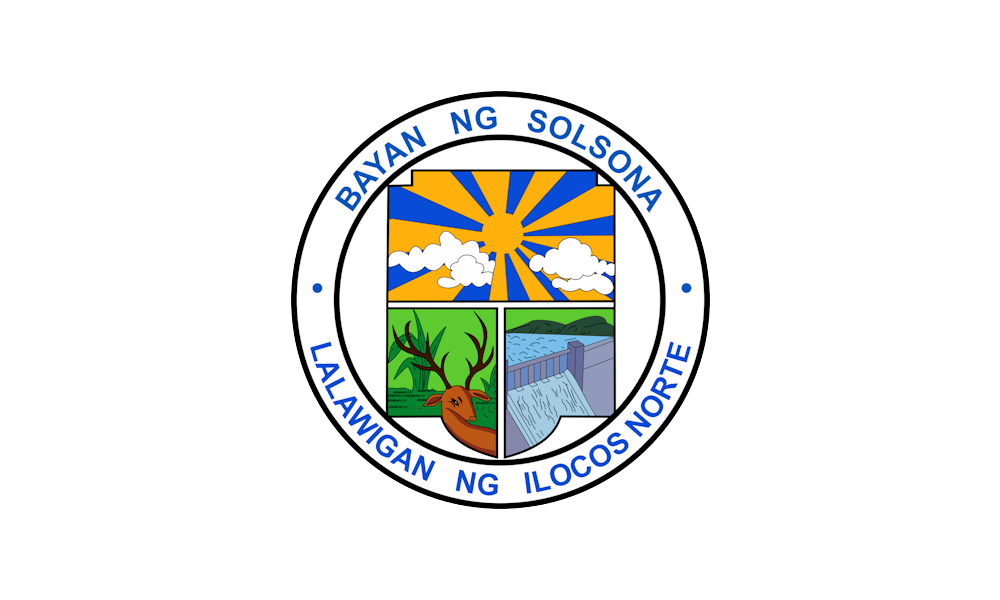
- Flag Seal

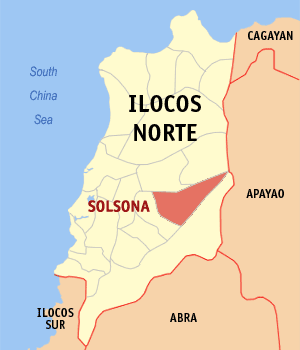
- Map of Ilocos Norte with Solsona highlighted
- Interactive map of Solsona
- Location within the Philippines
- Coordinates: 18°05′46″N 120°46′21″E
- Country: Philippines
- Region: Ilocos Region
- Province: Ilocos Norte
- District: 2nd district
- Founded: 1880
- Named for: Solsona, Spain
- Barangays: 22 (see Barangays)

Government
  - Type: Sangguniang Bayan
  - Mayor: Joseph E. de Lara
  - Vice Mayor: Bob G. Sacro
  - Representative: Eugenio Angelo M. Barba
  - Municipal Council: Members: Jonathan L. de Lara; Jovencio M. Pascua; Nestor M. de la Cruz; Norberto L. Agulay; Ceasar Paul M. Parado; Benigno D. Aquino; Mark Dennis P. del Castillo; Jose P. Martin Jr.
  - Electorate: 18,043 voters (2025)

Area
  - Total: 166.23 km^{2} (64.18 sq mi)
- Elevation: 732 m (2,402 ft)
- Highest elevation: 936 m (3,071 ft)
- Lowest elevation: 570 m (1,870 ft)

Population (2024 census)
  - Total: 26,249
  - Density: 157.91/km^{2} (408.98/sq mi)
  - Households: 5,953

Economy
  - Income class: 2nd municipal income class
  - Poverty incidence: 3.91% (2023)
  - Revenue: ₱ 239.5 million (2024)
  - Assets: ₱ 570.3 million (2024)
  - Expenditure: ₱ 192.6 million (2024)
  - Liabilities: ₱ 93.98 million (2024)

Service provider
  - Electricity: Ilocos Norte Electric Cooperative (INEC)
- Time zone: UTC+8 (PST)
- ZIP code: 2910
- PSGC: 0102822000
- IDD : area code: +63 (0)77
- Native languages: Ilocano; Tagalog
- Website: solsona.gov.ph

Solsona, officially the Municipality of Solsona (Ilocano: Ili ti Solsona; Filipino: Bayan ng Solsona), is a municipality in the province of Ilocos Norte, Philippines. According to the 2024 census, it has a population of 26,249 people.

Ascents of nearby Mount Sicapoo begin at Solsona, at the Gasgas River.

== Geography ==
Solsona is situated 26.85 kilometres (16.68 mi) from the provincial capital Laoag, and 493.94 kilometres (306.92 mi) from the country's capital city of Manila.

=== Barangays ===
Solsona is politically subdivided into 22 barangays. Each barangay consists of puroks and some have sitios.

- Aguitap
- Bagbag
- Bagbago
- Barcelona
- Bubuos
- Capurictan
- Catangraran
- Darasdas
- Juan (Poblacion)
- Laureta (Poblacion)
- Lipay
- Maananteng
- Manalpac
- Mariquet
- Nagpatpatan
- Nalasin
- Puttao
- San Juan
- San Julian
- Santa Ana
- Santiago
- Talugtog

=== Climate ===
Climate data for Solsona, Ilocos Norte
Month	Jan	Feb	Mar	Apr	May	Jun	Jul	Aug	Sep	Oct	Nov	Dec	Year
Mean daily maximum °C (°F)	27 (81)	28 (82)	30 (86)	32 (90)	31 (88)	31 (88)	30 (86)	30 (86)	30 (86)	29 (84)	28 (82)	27 (81)	29 (85)
Mean daily minimum °C (°F)	20 (68)	20 (68)	21 (70)	23 (73)	24 (75)	25 (77)	25 (77)	25 (77)	24 (75)	23 (73)	22 (72)	21 (70)	23 (73)
Average precipitation mm (inches)	38 (1.5)	37 (1.5)	37 (1.5)	49 (1.9)	181 (7.1)	214 (8.4)	264 (10.4)	251 (9.9)	243 (9.6)	229 (9.0)	129 (5.1)	96 (3.8)	1,768 (69.7)
Average rainy days	11.6	10.7	12.4	15.2	22.6	25.0	26.1	24.9	24.3	19.2	16.4	15.4	223.8
Source: Meteoblue

== Demographics ==
Population census of Solsona
Year	Pop.	±% p.a.
1903	6,864	—
1918	8,176	+1.17%
1939	9,032	+0.48%
1948	10,423	+1.60%
1960	12,043	+1.21%
1970	12,803	+0.61%
1975	14,142	+2.01%
1980	14,731	+0.82%
1990	18,883	+2.51%
1995	19,659	+0.76%
2000	21,338	+1.77%
2007	22,202	+0.55%
2010	22,990	+1.28%
2015	24,121	+0.92%
2020	24,851	+0.63%
2024	26,249	+1.32%
Source: Philippine Statistics Authority

In the 2024 census, the population of Solsona was 26,249 people, with a density of 160 inhabitants per square kilometre or 410 inhabitants per square mile.

== Economy ==
Poverty incidence of Solsona (%)

Source: Philippine Statistics Authority

Solsona has an agriculture-based economy that includes rice, corn, vegetables, and tobacco farming. Local enterprises adopt solar panel integrations for milling.

== Government ==
=== Local government ===
Solsona is part of the second congressional district of the province of Ilocos Norte. It is governed by a mayor, designated as its local chief executive, and by a municipal council as its legislative body in accordance with the Local Government Code. The mayor, vice mayor, and the councilors are elected directly by the people through an election held every three years.

=== Elected officials ===
Members of the Municipal Council (2025–2028)
Position	Name
Congressman	Eugenio Angelo M. Barba
Mayor	Joseph E. De Lara
Vice-Mayor	Jonathan L. De Lara
Councilors	Claudette Abigail B. De Lara
Councilors	Zamuel F. Balantac
Councilors	Francis Gerald D. Ganotisi
Councilors	Lourdines C. Dela Cruz
Councilors	Benigno D. Aquino
Councilors	Norberto L. Agulay
Councilors	Joseph A. Arellano
Councilors	Anthony Arvin A. Ganal

== Education ==
The Solsona Schools District Office governs all public and private elementary and high schools within the municipality.

=== Primary and elementary schools ===
- Bagbag Elementary School
- Bagbago Elementary School
- Barcelona Elementary School
- Catangraran Elementary School
- Darasdas Elementary School
- Faith Bible Baptist Academy
- Lipay Elementary School
- Maananteng Elementary School
- Manalpac Elementary School
- Nagpatpatan Elementary School
- San Juan Elementary School
- Santiago Elementary School
- Solsona Central Elementary School
- Sta. Ana Elementary School
- Talugtog Elementary School
- United Church of Christ in the Philippines Kiddie Learning Center

=== Secondary schools ===
- Bagbag Solsona National High School
- Gov. Roque B. Ablan Sr. Mem. Academy
- Solsona National High School
- Talugtog Solsona National High School
