= Liza Araneta Marcos =

Filipina lawyer and First Lady of the Philippines (born 1959)

Liza Araneta-Marcos
- First Lady Louise Araneta-Marcos

First Lady of the Philippines
- Incumbent
- Assumed role June 30, 2022
- President: Ferdinand R. Marcos Jr.
- Preceded by: José Miguel Arroyo (Note: Jose Miguel Arroyo, who was the husband of President Gloria Macapagal Arroyo, was the last to assume the role of First Gentleman, the male equivalent of First Lady, in a regular capacity. President Benigno Aquino III was a bachelor, while President Rodrigo Duterte had Honeylet Avanceña as his unmarried partner; Avanceña never held the role of First Lady under a regular capacity. Because of these, the role was vacant for 12 years.)

Personal details
- Born: Marie Louise Cacho Araneta; August 21, 1959 (age 67) Manila, Philippines
- Spouse: Ferdinand R. Marcos Jr. (m. 1993)
- Children: 3, including Sandro Simon and Vinny
- Parents: Manuel Araneta Jr. (father); Milagros A. Cacho (mother)
- Relatives: Araneta family Marcos family
- Education: Ateneo de Manila University (B.A., LL.B); New York University
- Occupation: Academic
- Profession: Lawyer
- Website: pbbm.com.ph

Marie Louise "Liza" Cacho Araneta-Marcos (née Araneta; born August 21, 1959) is a Filipino lawyer and academic who has served as the First Lady of the Republic of the Philippines since 2022, as the wife of Ferdinand R. Marcos Jr., the 17th President of the Republic of the Philippines. Born and raised in Manila, Araneta-Marcos studied law and graduated from Ateneo de Manila University, and later completed postgraduate courses at New York University. Araneta-Marcos eventually met Bongbong Marcos in New York City in 1989 and married him in 1993. In addition to her law practice, she taught in various universities in the country such as Far Eastern University Institute of Law, Northwestern University, and the Mariano Marcos State University College of Law. She is also the founder of two law firms, namely MOST (Marcos, Ochoa, Serapio & Tan) Law Firm and M&A Associates.

Araneta-Marcos eventually became the first lady after her husband's inauguration as president on June 30, 2022, and later played an active role in her husband's presidency, where she initiated various programs that supported her husband's policies. In addition, she promoted her key advocacies in health, arts, cultural heritage, social welfare, and education, while also spearheading renovation works of various government buildings. She also conducted numerous activities and meetings with various organizations primarily aimed to boost the country's development. She also hosted events in the Malacañang Palace with foreign guests, ambassadors, and dignitaries, and also travelled alongside her husband during overseas trips in various countries, while also having a variety of solo trips into various countries. Despite her active role as first lady, Araneta-Marcos is known to maintain a private life and avoided social media until she was forced to create her account after her husband's presidency.

== Early life and education ==
Liza Araneta was born on August 21, 1959, in Manila, Philippines, to Manuel L. Araneta Jr., a Filipino basketball Olympian who was born in Iloilo City but was raised in Bago, Negros Occidental, and Milagros A. Cacho, and is the fifth child among eighth siblings. Both of her parents were of Spanish descent, and came from prominent political backgrounds, while her connection to the Araneta family is traced to her Basque roots. Araneta is also first cousins with Jeric Soriano, the father of filmmaker Paul Soriano. She, along with her husband were also the principal sponsors of Soriano's marriage with actress Toni Gonzaga. Aside from being affiliated with the Marcos family, she also has a connection with the Roxas family, as her father is the first cousin of Judith "Judy" Araneta-Roxas, the mother of politician Mar Roxas, which makes her and the former interior secretary second cousins. She also has ties with the Cojuangco clan, as Milagros' youngest sister, Rosario A. Cacho, was married to Pedro Cojuangco, the eldest brother of former president Corazon Aquino.

Araneta grew up in a strict household. She recalled her aunts inspecting the maid's quarters to ensure they were clean, and a "closet contest" with her siblings in which whoever had the cleanest closet was rewarded.

Araneta earned a Bachelor of Arts in interdisciplinary studies from the Ateneo de Manila University in 1981, then got her Bachelor of Laws at the same university in 1985. She was a working student while in law school because her mother would not pay her tuition as a way to instill the value of hard work. After graduating from the Ateneo, Araneta enrolled at New York University, where she completed her postgraduate courses in criminal procedure.

== Career ==
Araneta began her career as a lawyer in New York City after graduating from the New York University, and became a law professor in various law colleges and universities across the country. She began her teaching career at the Far Eastern University Institute of Law in Manila from 1996 to 1998, and at the Northwestern University College of Law in 1998 to 2006. In 2006, she temporarily stopped her career as a professor to become a founding member of the MOST (Marcos, Ochoa, Serapio & Tan) Law Firm. Araneta-Marcos left the firm in January 2019 to start her own law firm, named M&A Associates.

Araneta-Marcos eventually returned to teaching in 2010, where she became a professor at the Pamantasan ng Lungsod ng Maynila from 2010 to 2014, before moving to Saint Louis University in 2014 to 2018, and lastly at the Mariano Marcos State University (MMSU) College of Law from 2018 to 2020. During her time as a professor in MMSU, she also served as an assistant dean within the College of Law, before she ended her teaching career for a second time, after she struggled to adopt to the shift from face-to-face classes to online learning due to the COVID-19 pandemic.

Her claim on her online resume of being a member of the New York State Bar Association (NYSBA) was questioned in April 2022. In an email reply to Rappler, the NYSBA responded that she is not a member of their organization, stating that her name and variations of such name do not exist in their database. Vera Files also conducted a separate fact-checking research which ended in a similar conclusion.

== First Lady of the Philippines (2022–present) ==
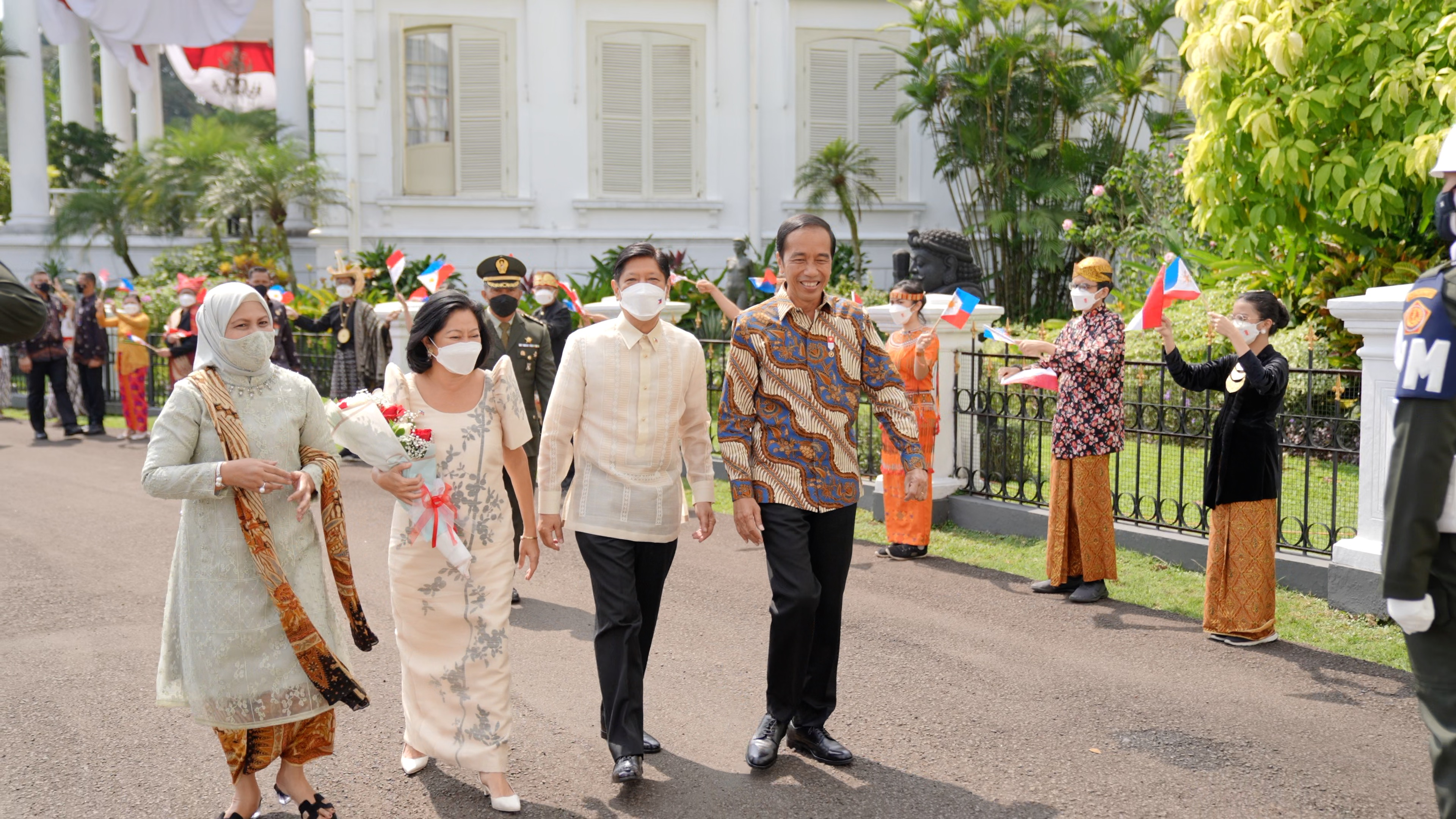
The Marcos couple (center) with then-Indonesian president Joko Widodo and then-Indonesian first lady Iriana in Bogor, September 2022

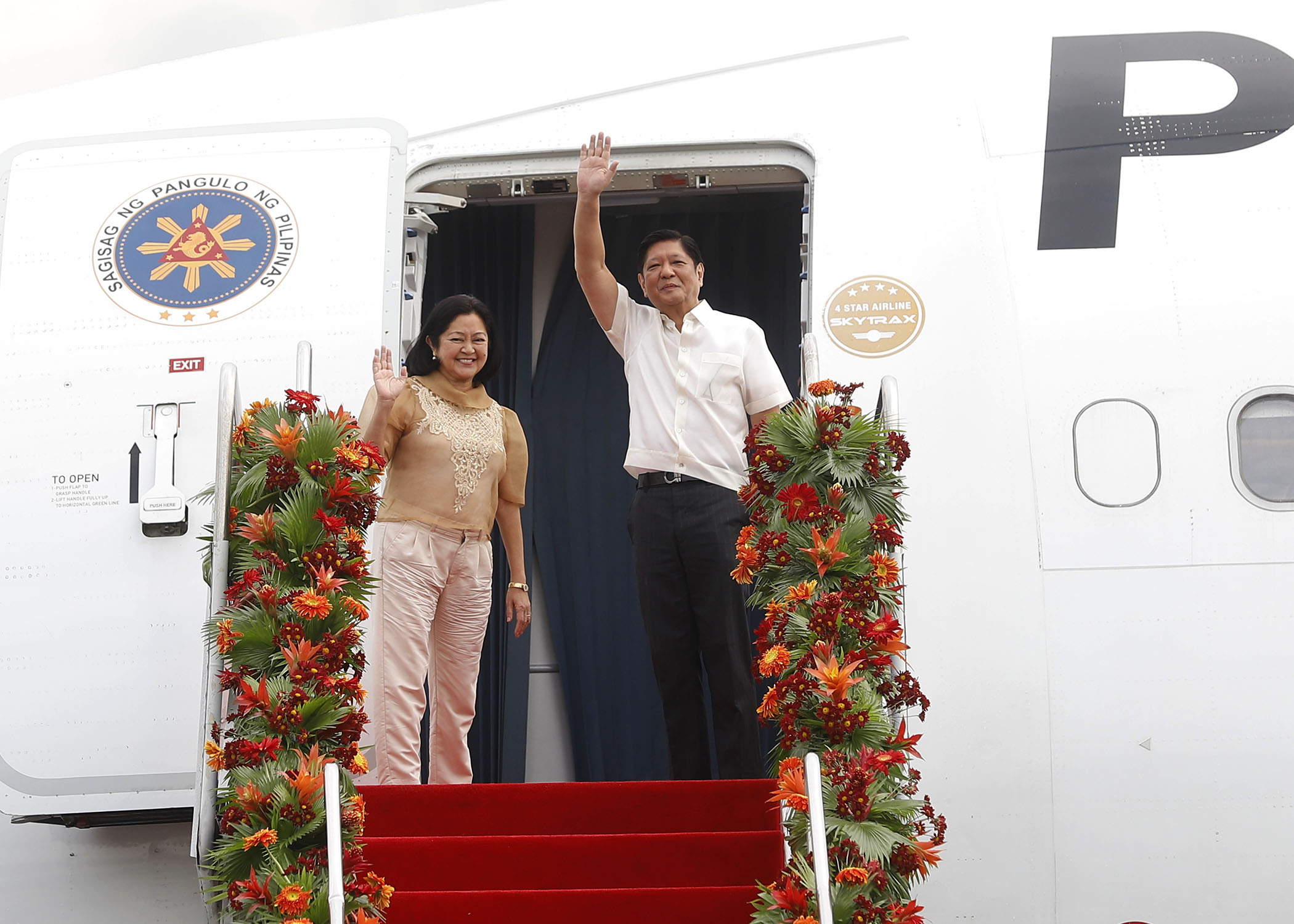
Araneta Marcos (left) with her husband departing for China for a state visit, January 2023

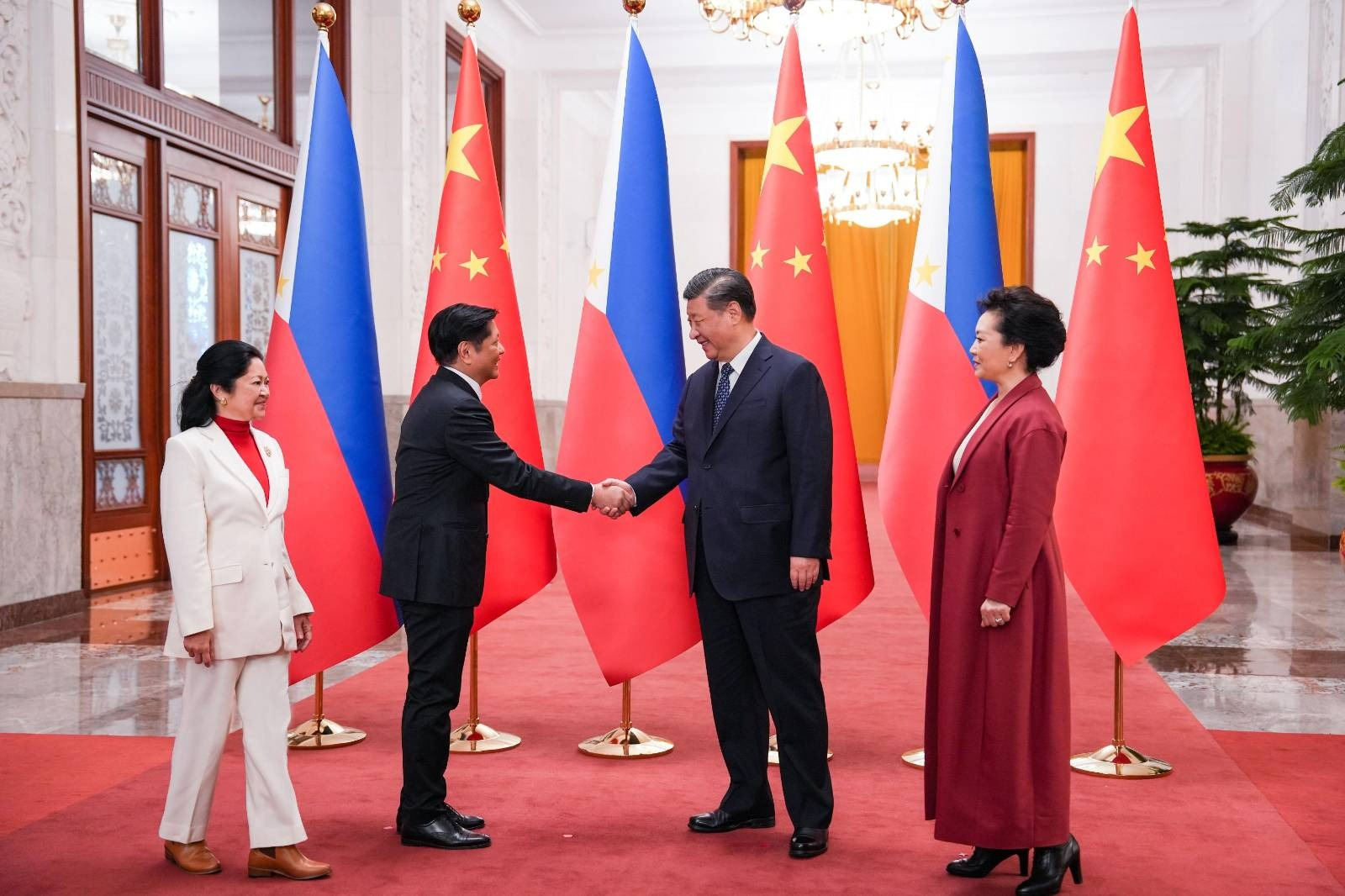
The Marcos couple (left) meets Chinese leader Xi Jinping and his wife Peng Liyuan in Beijing, January 4, 2023

During the 2022 Philippine elections, Araneta Marcos served as the main strategist for her husband's presidential campaign, and collaborated with Paul Soriano in making Marcos' campaign advertisements. When it comes to certain political positions, Araneta Marcos favors the legalization of divorce in the Philippines but for "cogent reasons" maintaining that marriage should not be easily be dissolvable. She is also in favor legalizing abortion for in cases of pregnancies resulting from rape and incest as well as the legalizing of same-sex relationships. Araneta-Marcos temporarily left her own law firm following her husband's victory in the 2022 elections, in order to fulfill her duties as First Lady of the Philippines. Her assumption of the role, marked the first time that the Philippines had a first lady since Loi Ejercito, the wife of President Joseph Estrada.

Aside from being the First Lady, Araneta Marcos continued her teaching career in part-time. In August 2022, she chose to teach criminal law part-time at West Visayas State University in Iloilo, her father's home province.

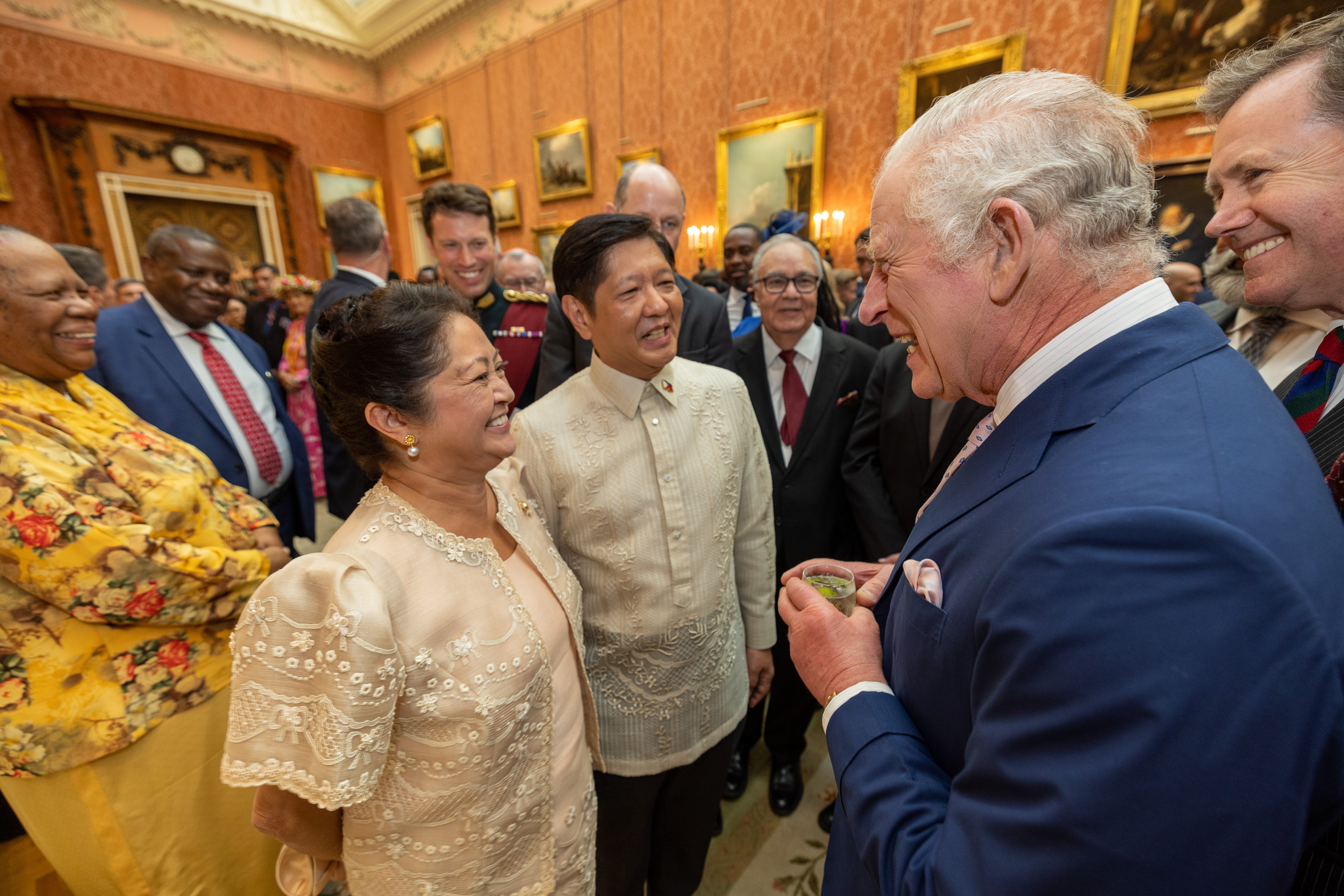
The Marcos couple (center) meets with King Charles III at Buckingham Palace, London, the day before the latter's coronation, May 5, 2023

On July 27, 2022, she hosted a meeting with United States Secretary of the Navy Carlos Del Toro and his wife, Betty Del Toro, and the United States Ambassador to the Philippines MaryKay Carlson. On August 3, 2022, Araneta Marcos hosted her first Malacañang event, as she hosted the lady ambassadors' luncheon, held at the Rizal Ceremonial Hall. On the same day, she also launched her own Facebook page. On August 4, 2022, she also held a luncheon with then-Chinese ambassador Huang Xilian and his dignitaries. On August 8, 2022, Araneta Marcos served as the guest of honor in the 78th commencement exercises at the University of Batangas.

Marcos with U.S. first lady Melania Trump in New York City, September 22, 2026

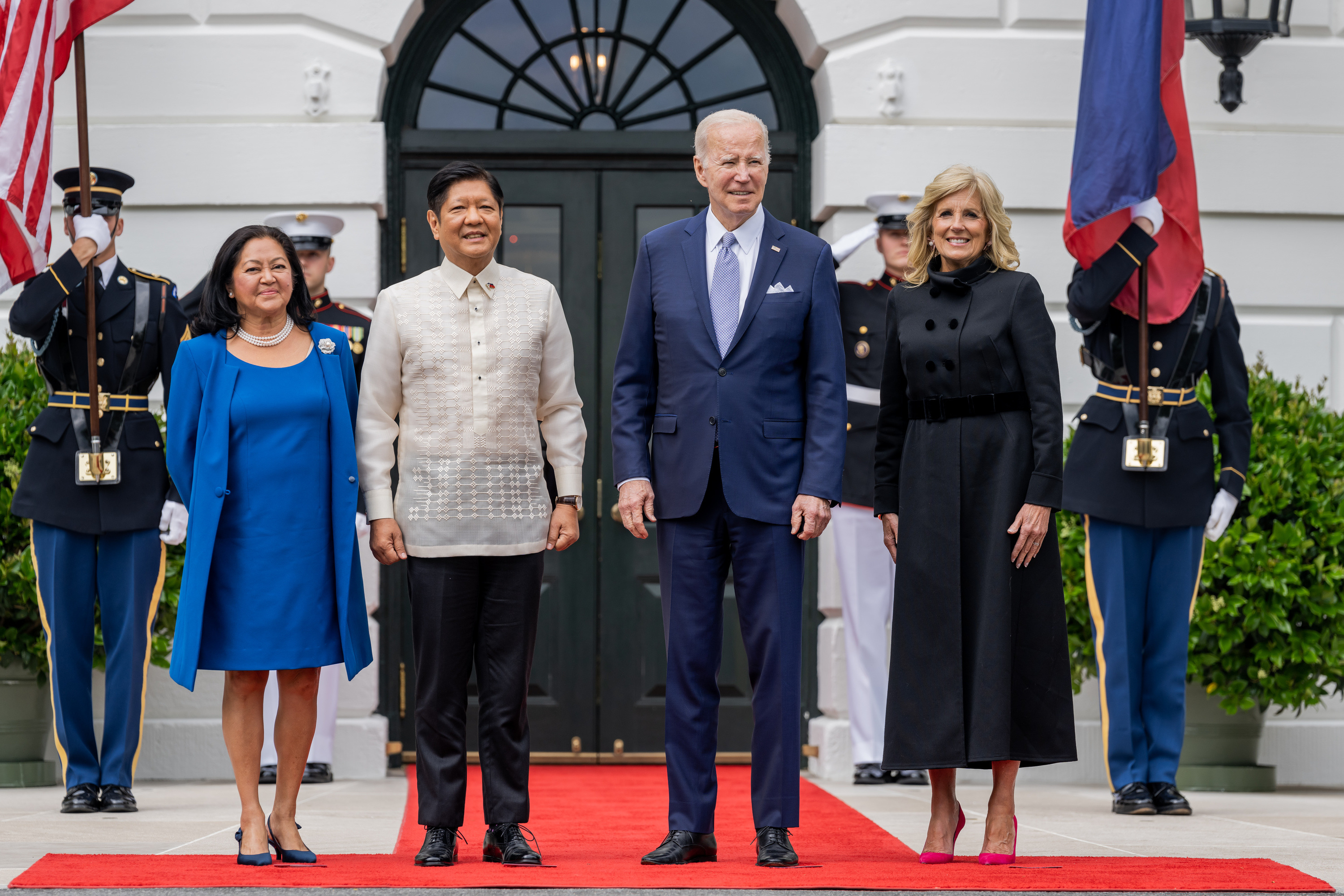
The Marcos couple (left) with then-U.S. president Joe Biden and then-U.S. first lady Jill Biden at the White House during the formers' official visit to Washington, D.C., May 1, 2023

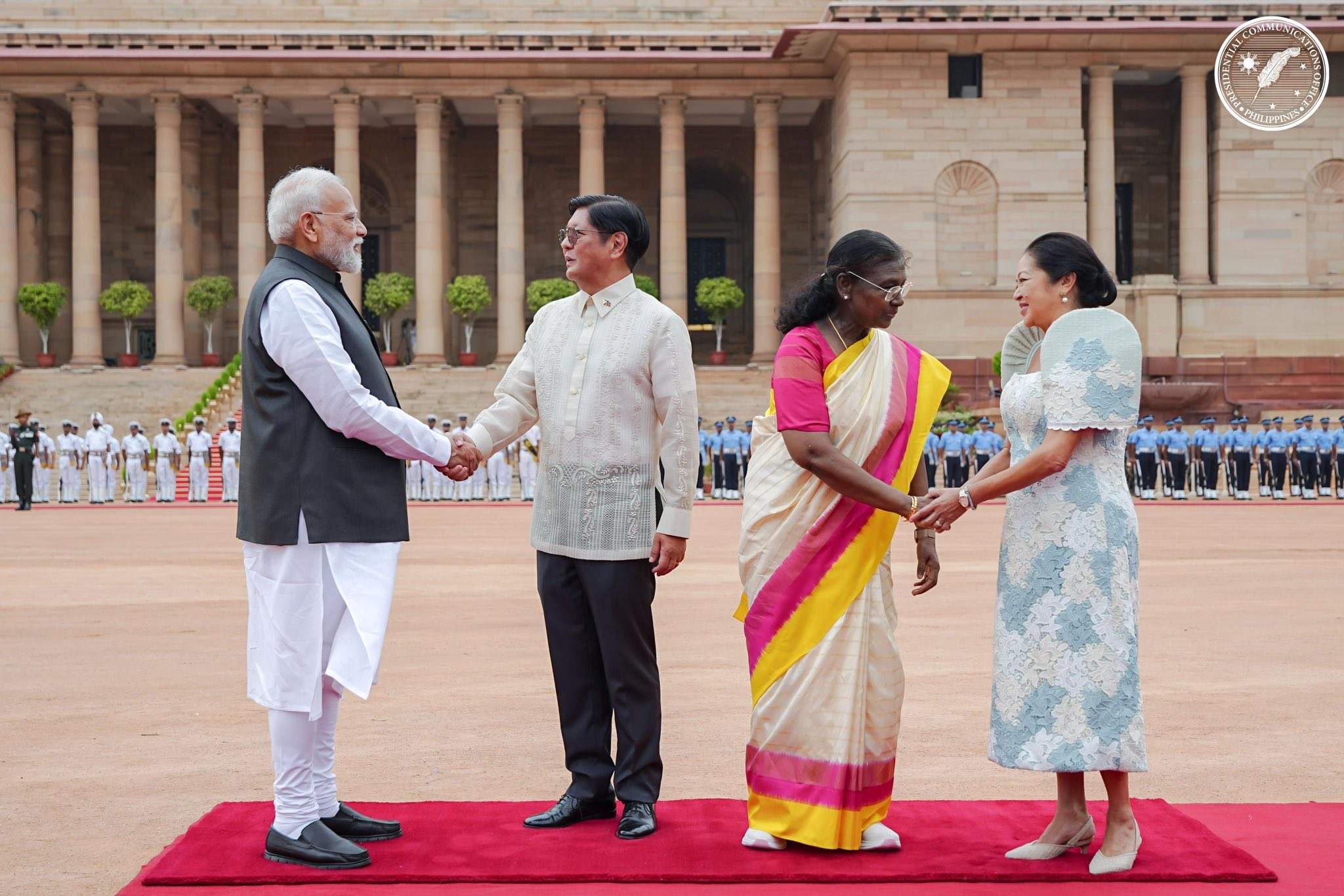
The Marcos couple meeting with Indian prime minister Narendra Modi (left) and Indian president Droupadi Murmu (3rd from left) at Rashtrapati Bhavan during the formers' state visit to New Delhi, August 5, 2025

On August 9, 2022, Araneta Marcos served as the guest of honor at the graduation of the VIP Protection Course Class 128-2022 at the Presidential Security Group (PSG) Headquarters in Malacañang Park. On August 15, 2022, she attended the Indian Independence Day reception at the Shangri-La at the Fort, Manila. On November 3, 2022, Araneta Marcos was named as National President and Chief Girl Scout of the Girl Scouts of the Philippines.

=== Renovations at the Malacañang Palace ===
During the early days of Bongbong Marcos' presidency, Araneta Marcos spearheaded the renovation of Malacañang Palace to enhance and modernize its interiors with Filipino designs. The last major renovation occurred in 1978–1979 under former first lady Imelda Marcos. Key areas, including the Reception Hall, Grand Staircase, Internal House Affairs Office, Office of the Social Secretary, Protocol Office, Functional Staff Quarters (formerly the Engineering Warehouse), the central kitchen, Palace Gates, staff offices, and staff sleeping quarters underwent significant improvements. The renovation also introduced a new indoor garden, enhancing key areas with plants and flowers. Renovation works were also carried out in the Bahay Pangulo, the current residence of President Bongbong Marcos, which was completed on October 2024.

Araneta Marcos also launched renovation projects at the Bahay Ugnayan Museum, the Teus Mansion, and the Goldenberg Mansion, which now serves as museums showcasing the country's culture and history made by Philippine Presidents. The Bahay Ugnayan Museum currently displays the incumbent President Bongbong Marcos's life through the years, while the Teus Mansion displays various memorabilia used by Former Presidents and First Ladies. Meanwhile, the Goldenberg Mansion is currently renovated into an events venue for specialized events. However, criticisms have been made over lavish events held at the said mansion.

==== Laperal Mansion renovation ====
In March 2024, the Laperal Mansion, also known as the Presidential Guest House, was reopened as the mansion was renovated and currently serves as a guest house for VIP officials, foreign heads of state, and foreign dignitaries. The renovation project included the renovation of the Mansion's state rooms, guest bedrooms, and a spa, with rooms named after key figures in Philippine history and past Philippine presidents, while partnering with local artists and designers for the designs incorporated in each room.

==== The Mansion renovation ====
Upon the completion of the Laperal Mansion renovation project in March 2024, plans were also announced for the renovation of The Mansion, the presidential summer house in Baguio. 6 months after the plans were made public, the opening of the newly renovated Presidential Museum at The Mansion was inaugurated on September 8, 2024, with Araneta Marcos leading the opening rights. The renovated mansion features a variety of artworks and historical artifacts from the Malacañang Palace. Araneta Marcos took inspiration of the mansion's renovation works to the Teus Mansion, the main Presidential Museum, after its successful reopening in June 2023. Renovation works for the other parts of the area are reportedly still ongoing, which is aimed to rejuvenate the city and mansion's significance and rich history.

=== Programs ===
==== Lab for All ====
The Lab for All: Libreng Laboratoryo, Konsulta at Gamot Para sa Lahat Project (lit. transl. Lab for All: Free Laboratories, Consultation, and Medicine for All Project) is a healthcare services program primarily focused on delivering free health services to various provinces in the country, such as physical/medical examination, x-ray, consultation, and medical consultation services. The project was first launched in Batangas City on May 16, 2023, and has been expanded to various cities and provinces in the country.

==== Project – Likha ====
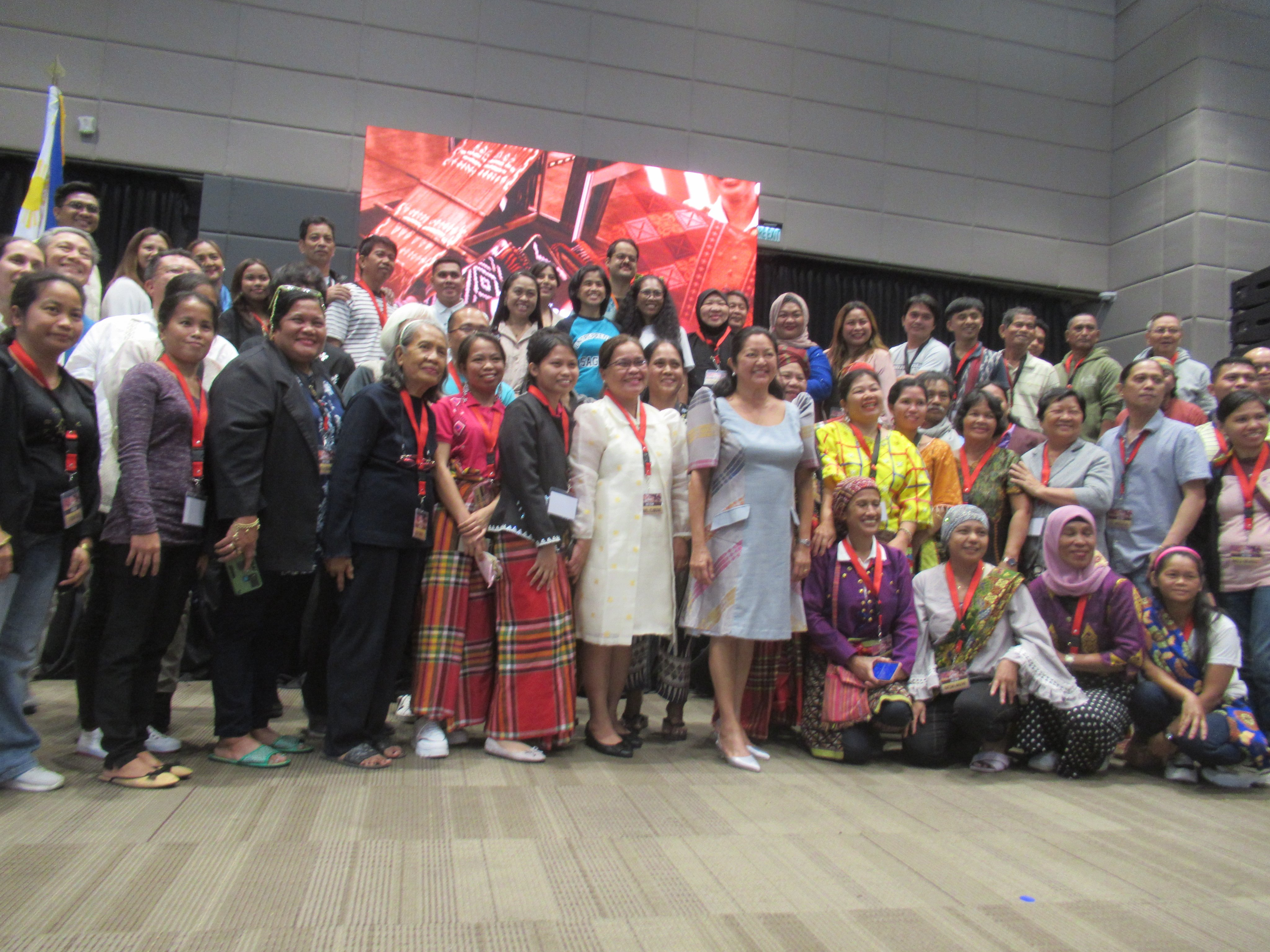
Marcos standing with Filipino artisans, June 2023

The Project – Likha (lit. transl. Project – Creation) is a cultural convention project allowing local artisans to showcase their works and honor their creativity. The program aims to boost Filipino artistry, fashion, and products through various conventions being held in collaboration with the National Commission for Culture and the Arts. The program also aims to boost the showcasing of Filipino craftsmanship and creativity in their respective fields.

=== Advocacies ===
As First Lady, Araneta Marcos has been involved in matters primarily on education and culture. Being a part-time criminal law professor, Araneta Marcos stressed the importance of education within the country, and launches measures to support students in need. During the opening of the Presidential Museum at the National Library of the Philippines, Araneta Marcos also emphasized the importance of libraries in the educational system, and has loaned over 40,000 books for organizing, cleaning, and repairs.

Aside from education, Araneta Marcos also initiated support programs on arts & crafts, and cultural activities, as she once spearheaded the full scale cultural mapping program within her husband's province, Ilocos Norte, during her time as the province's first lady. Araneta Marcos also launched cultural enhancement, preservation, industrial, and tourism programs which aims to support the local communities, particularly in the weaving industry.

Araneta Marcos is also a known supporter for the arts, wherein she serves as one of the Board of Trustees at the Asian Cultural Council since 2016, and has inaugurated support programs for various artists.

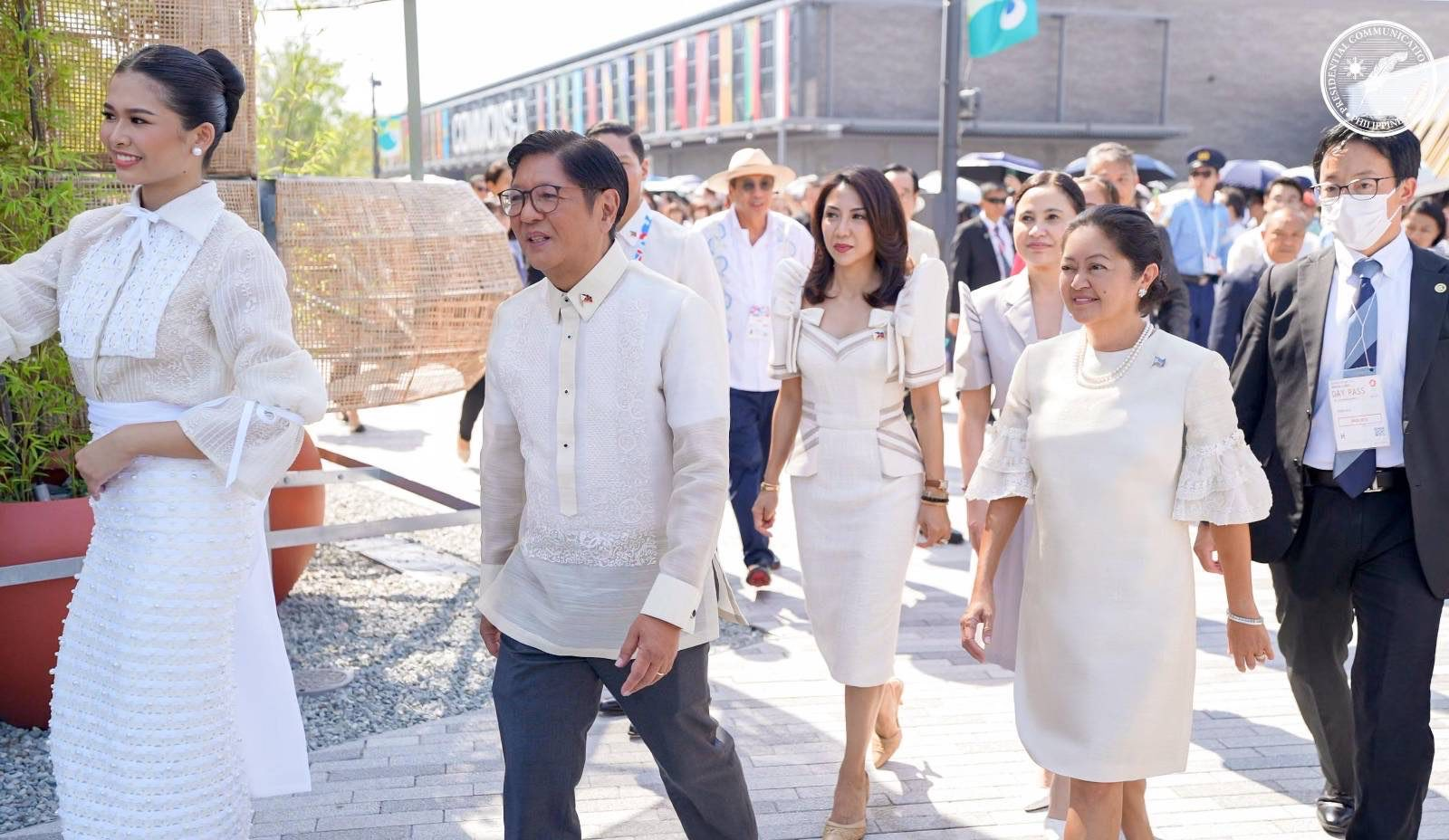
The Marcos couple (2nd from left and 4th from right) visiting the Philippine Pavilion at Expo 2025 in Osaka with then-tourism secretary Christina Frasco, June 21, 2025.

She also considers the rehabilitation of the Pasig River as a top priority in order to restore the river's former beauty, wishing to transform the Pasig River into an attraction like the River Thames in the United Kingdom, the Chao Phraya River in Thailand, and the Seine in France as "arteries of commerce, lifestyle, tourism, and culture" that "draw visitors from home and overseas". Araneta Marcos also spearheaded the implementation of the Pasig Bigyang Buhay Muli Project, a river rehabilitation project that includes the construction of the Pasig River Esplanade, a riverfront esplanade project located along the Pasig River, and will feature a variety of parks, open spaces, shops, bike lanes, and walk paths, in collaboration with his husband, President Bongbong Marcos, DHSUD secretary Jose Acuzar, WTA Design Studio principal architect William Ti Jr., and other local officials.

=== Political views ===
As First Lady, Araneta Marcos has been subjected to accusations of her interfering with her husband's administration, which she has denied. In an interview by broadcaster Anthony Taberna in April 2024, she acknowledged that her relationship with Marcos' vice president, Sara Duterte had declined after she said she saw the latter laughing when her father, former President Rodrigo Duterte publicly called his successor a drug addict ("bangag") and accused their son Sandro of seeking higher political office during a rally against proposed constitutional reform in January 2024. Araneta Marcos also admitted to ignoring the Vice President in public functions following the incident; in February that year, she was seen snubbing the Vice President during President Bongbong Marcos' departure to Vietnam.

In the same interview with Taberna, Araneta Marcos called herself "the worst politician", stating that her husband once called her in jest the "ambassador of badwill" due to her misremembering politicians' names.

== Personal life ==
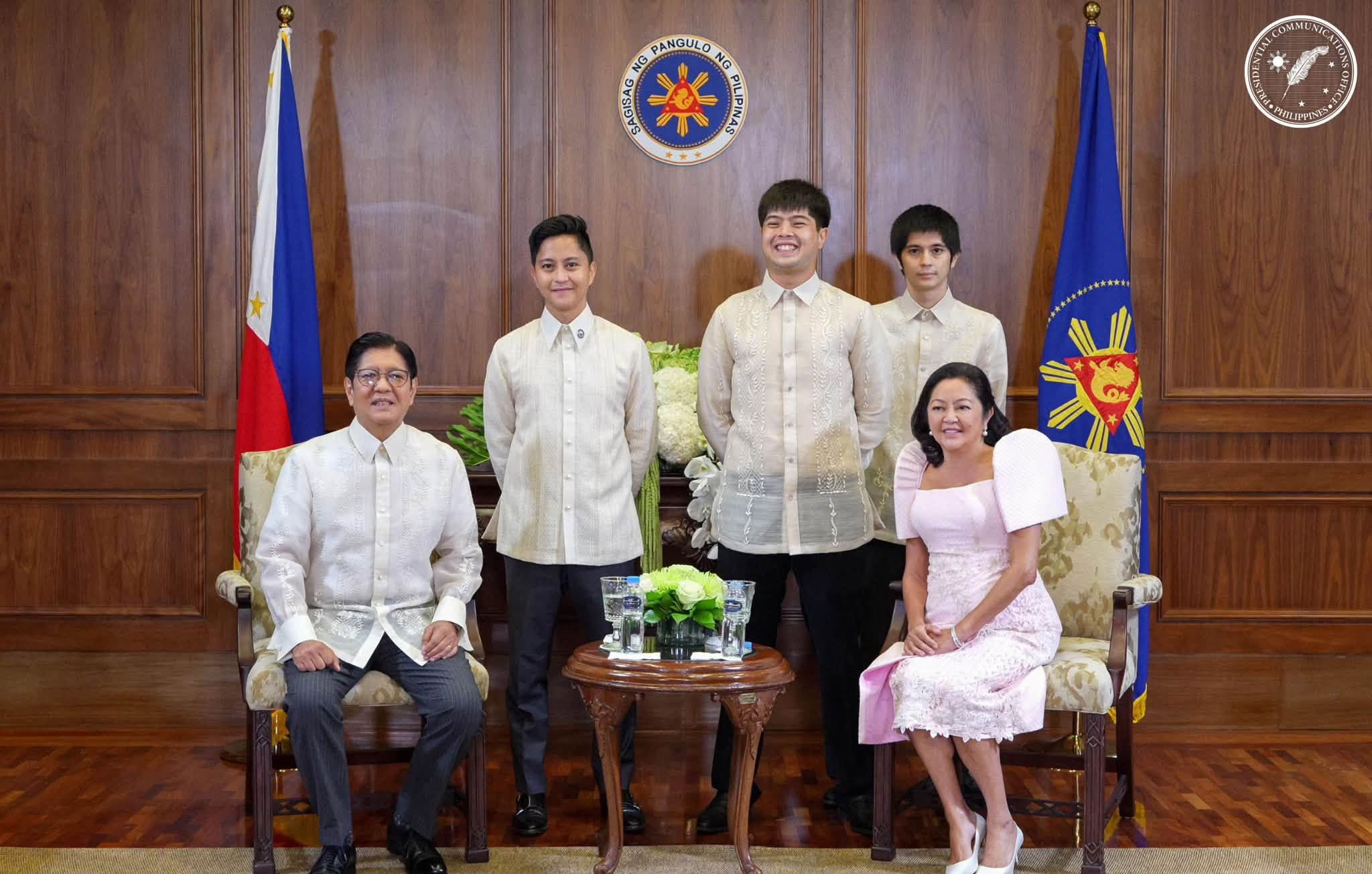
The Marcos family before the 2026 State of the Nation Address

Liza Araneta Marcos first met Bongbong Marcos, her would-be husband, in 1989 in New York City through mutual friends. Liza was working as a lawyer at that time while the Marcos family was in exile from the Philippines following the People Power Revolution of 1986. She and Bongbong got married on April 17, 1993, at the San Francesco Convent in Fiesole, Italy. They have three sons, including Ilocos Norte's 1st district representative Sandro Marcos (born 1994) and software engineer Vinny Marcos (born 1997). Araneta Marcos is known to be living in a private life prior to her husband's presidential bid, and rarely participates in interviews with the media. The Marcos family maintains a residence in Forbes Park, Makati.

Like her husband, Araneta-Marcos also exercises regularly, and has workout routine that consists of jogging, walking, swimming, yoga, and pilates.

== Honors ==
- Japan:
  - May 22, 2026: Grand Cordon of the Order of the Precious Crown

== Bibliography ==
Books and Publications

- Ilocos Norte: A Travel Guide Book (2004) (co-authored with Regalado Trota José, Digna Apilado, Eric B. Zerrudo, Michael Manalo, Jose Claudio B. Guerrero and Mayo Uno Aurelio Martin, Fr. Apolonio Ranche, Aimee Marcos) (as editor)

== Notes ==
Honorary titles
| Vacant Title last held by Jose Miguel Arroyo as First Gentleman | First Lady of the Philippines; 2022–present | Incumbent |
