= Marcos family =

Filipino political family

- Political family
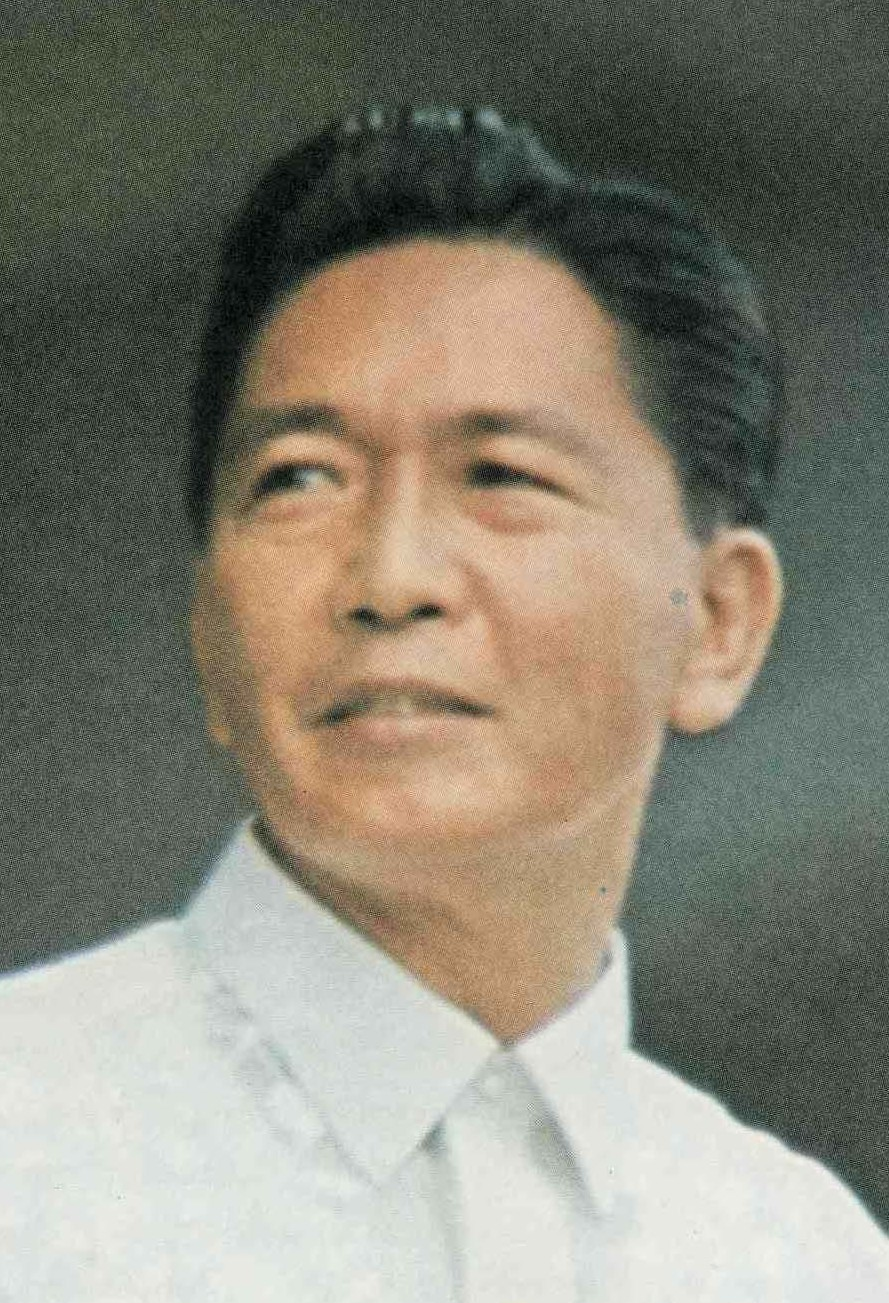
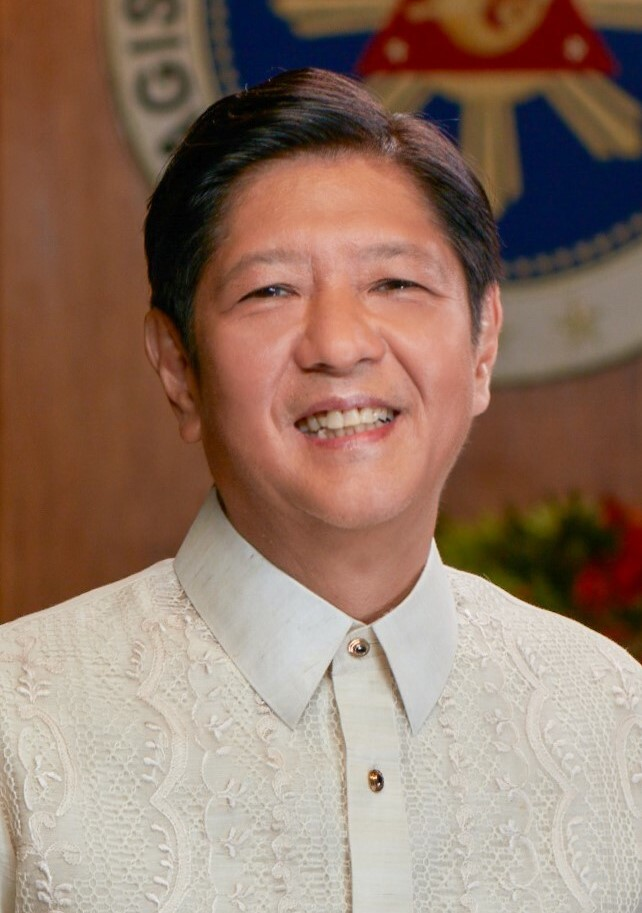
- Mariano Marcos Ferdinand Marcos Bongbong Marcos
- Country: Philippines
- Current region: Ilocos Region and Metro Manila, Philippines
- Origin: Batac, Ilocos Norte, Captaincy General of the Philippines
- Founded: June 2, 1925; 101 years ago
- Founder: Mariano Marcos
- Current head: Bongbong Marcos
- Titles: List: Prime Minister of the Philippines; President of the Philippines; Senator of the Philippines; Secretary of Philippine National Defense; Secretary of Philippine Agriculture; Governor of Metro Manila; Governor of Ilocos Norte; Vice Governor of Ilocos Norte; House Representative (Ilocos Norte-1st); House Representative (Ilocos Norte-2nd); Member of the Regular Batasang Pambansa (Ilocos Norte at-large); Board Member (Ilocos Norte-2nd); Mayor of San Nicolas; Mayor of Laoag
- Members: List: Mariano Marcos; Ferdinand Marcos; Bongbong Marcos; Imee Marcos-Manotoc; Irene Marcos-Araneta; Aimee Marcos; Matthew Marcos Manotoc; Sandro Marcos; William Vincent Marcos; Michael Marcos Keon; Angelo Marcos Barba and others
- Connected members: Imelda Marcos; Louise Araneta-Marcos; Cecilia Marcos
- Connected families: Romualdez family Araneta family
- Distinctions: Fabián Marcos y Galimba and Cresencia Rubio y Manglal-lan
- Traditions: Roman Catholicism

The Marcos family (UK: /ˈmɑːrkɒs/ MAR-koss, US: /-koʊs, -kɔːs/ -kohss, -kawss, Tagalog: [ˈmaɾkɔs]) is a political family in the Philippines. They have established themselves in the country's politics, having established a political dynasty that traces its beginnings to the 1925 election of Mariano Marcos to the Philippine House of Representatives as congressman for the second district of Ilocos Norte; reached its peak during the 21-year rule of Ferdinand Marcos as president of the Philippines that included his 14-year dictatorship beginning with the declaration of Martial Law throughout the country; continues today with the political careers of Imelda Marcos, Imee Marcos, and Sandro Marcos; and reached a fresh political apex with the presidency of Bongbong Marcos.

Imee Marcos has attributed the continued reign of the Marcos family to the inherent feudalism of Philippine culture. Although nominally democratic, Philippine society effectively blocks individual Philippine citizens from having much political power, forcing them to be dependent on powerful figures that social scientists have called "bosses" or "caciques". Sandro Marcos, the most politically prominent of the fourth generation of Marcoses, has argued that political dynasties are simply a "natural progression" for members of powerful families.

Although Article II Section 26 of the current Philippine constitution, promulgated after the Marcoses were ousted from the Philippines in 1986, explicitly prohibits the perpetuation of political dynasties, little legislation has since been put in place to enforce the provision. The prominence of the Marcos family in Philippine politics has been stopped twice. The first came with the victory of Julio Nalundasan over Mariano Marcos and the subsequent arrest of Ferdinand Marcos for his murder, the publicity for which brought Ferdinand Marcos to the national consciousness and eventually led to his rise to power. The second was when the Marcos dictatorship was deposed by the 1986 EDSA People Power Revolution and the family was exiled to Hawaii. After Ferdinand Marcos's 1989 death, the remaining members of the family were allowed to return to the Philippines to face various corruption charges in 1992. However, they were able to return to political power that same year, to the dismay of many Filipino people, with the election of Bongbong Marcos as congressman for the second district of Ilocos Norte.

At least one other branch of the family, that of Ferdinand's sister Elizabeth Marcos-Keon, is also in politics, with her son Michael Marcos Keon having been elected board member in 2004 and governor of Ilocos Norte in 2007.

Bongbong Marcos ran and won in the 2010 Philippine Senate election, placing 7th place. The win was the first time a Marcos won a national position since the family's exile in 1986.

6 years later, Marcos Jr ran for the Vice Presidency of the Philippines, placing second place, losing by a slim margin to Camarines Sur representative Leni Robredo. Marcos filed a protest with the Presidential Electoral Tribunal. The protest and recount took 5 years, until in 2021 the Supreme Court junked the electoral protest for lack of evidence.

During the 2019 Philippine Senate election, Imee Marcos the eldest daughter of Ferdinand Marcos, also the governor of Ilocos Norte, ran for the Senate of the Philippines and won, placing 8th.

After 6 years, Bongbong Marcos announced his candidacy for President of the Philippines, promising unity and recovery, despite intense opposition due to his family's history.

Despite his father's reputation, Bongbong Marcos won the 2022 Philippine presidential election and was sworn in on June 30, 2022, 36 years after his family was exiled by the People Power Revolution.

== History ==
=== Beginnings of the Marcos dynasty (1925–1945) ===
==== The Second Congressional District of Ilocos Norte ====
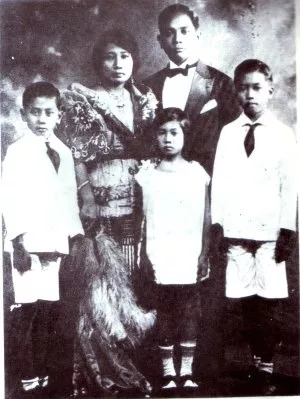
Marcos family c. 1920s

The Marcos political dynasty is generally acknowledged to have been founded when Mariano Marcos y Rubio (1897–1945) was elected to the Philippine House of Representatives as congressman for the second district of Ilocos Norte in 1925, although his father Fabian Marcos also served in local politics, as gobernadorcillo (the equivalent of today's mayor) of Batac in the days after the Philippine Revolution.

Mariano Marcos became a prominent member of the house, serving as chair of the house committee on ways and means and member of the committees on public instruction, public works, public estate, and mines and natural resources. In the election of 1932, however, he ran against Emilio Medina of Laoag and Julio Nalundasan of Batac. With the Batac vote split between him and Nalundasan, Medina won the house seat.

==== The murder of Julio Nalundasan ====
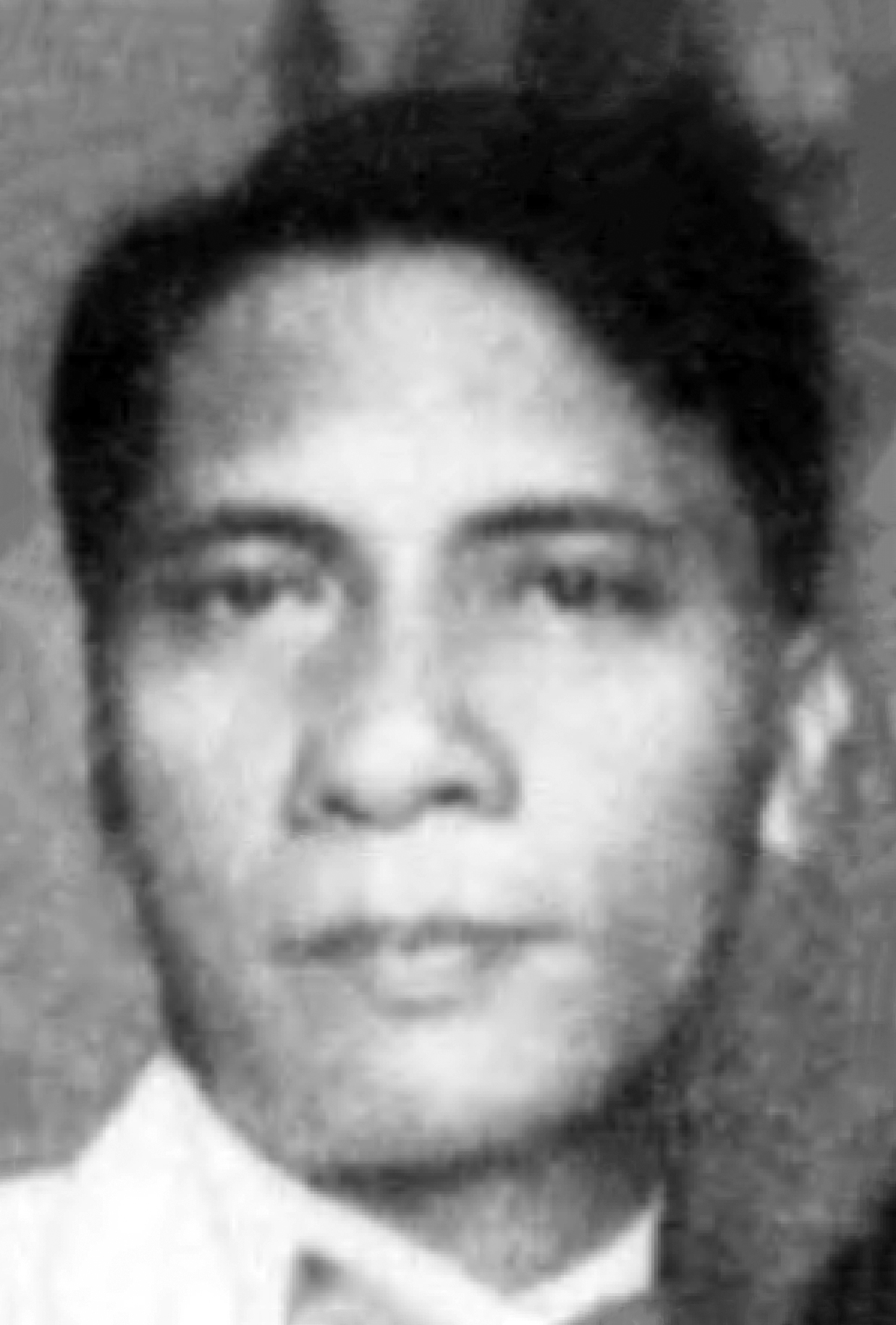
Julio Nalundasan

Mariano Marcos fought a highly contested election against Nalundasan for the same seat in 1935, and Nalundasan won by a landslide. A day after his proclamation, Nalundasan openly mocked Marcos, staging a funeral parade that ended in front of the Marcos house to show Mariano's political career was "dead".

On that same night, Nalundasan was shot dead by a sniper when he stepped out onto his back porch to brush his teeth. Mariano Marcos, his brother Pio, his son Ferdinand, and his brother-in-law Quirino Lizardo all became suspects. Mariano and Pio were cleared of the crime, but Ferdinand Marcos and Quirino Lizardo were arrested.

Aware of the publicity he could get out of the national coverage of the trial, Ferdinand represented himself before the court, with the lawyers hired by the family for the trial guiding him in his legal arguments.

Ferdinand initially lost the case and he and Lizardo were convicted. Public interest in the case, however, led to the Supreme Court of the Philippines eventually overthrowing the conviction, with Associate Justice and later President José P. Laurel arguing that it would have been a waste for someone with Ferdinand's legal talents to merely rot in a prison cell.

The trial, and the overturning of the conviction turned Ferdinand Marcos into the "most famous young man in the islands", with then-President Manuel L. Quezon arranging to meet the boy and suggesting that he use the newfound popularity to enter Philippine politics.

Before that could happen, however, the Marcoses were overtaken by the events of World War II.

==== The execution of Mariano Marcos ====
Mariano Marcos was executed in the closing days of the war on March 8, 1945. The Marcos family's account claims he was executed by the Japanese, but other eyewitness accounts say that he was caught by Philippine guerillas, tried as a Japanese collaborator, and executed by tearing apart with two carabaos.

=== Ferdinand Marcos and the rise of the Marcos dynasty (1949–1986) ===
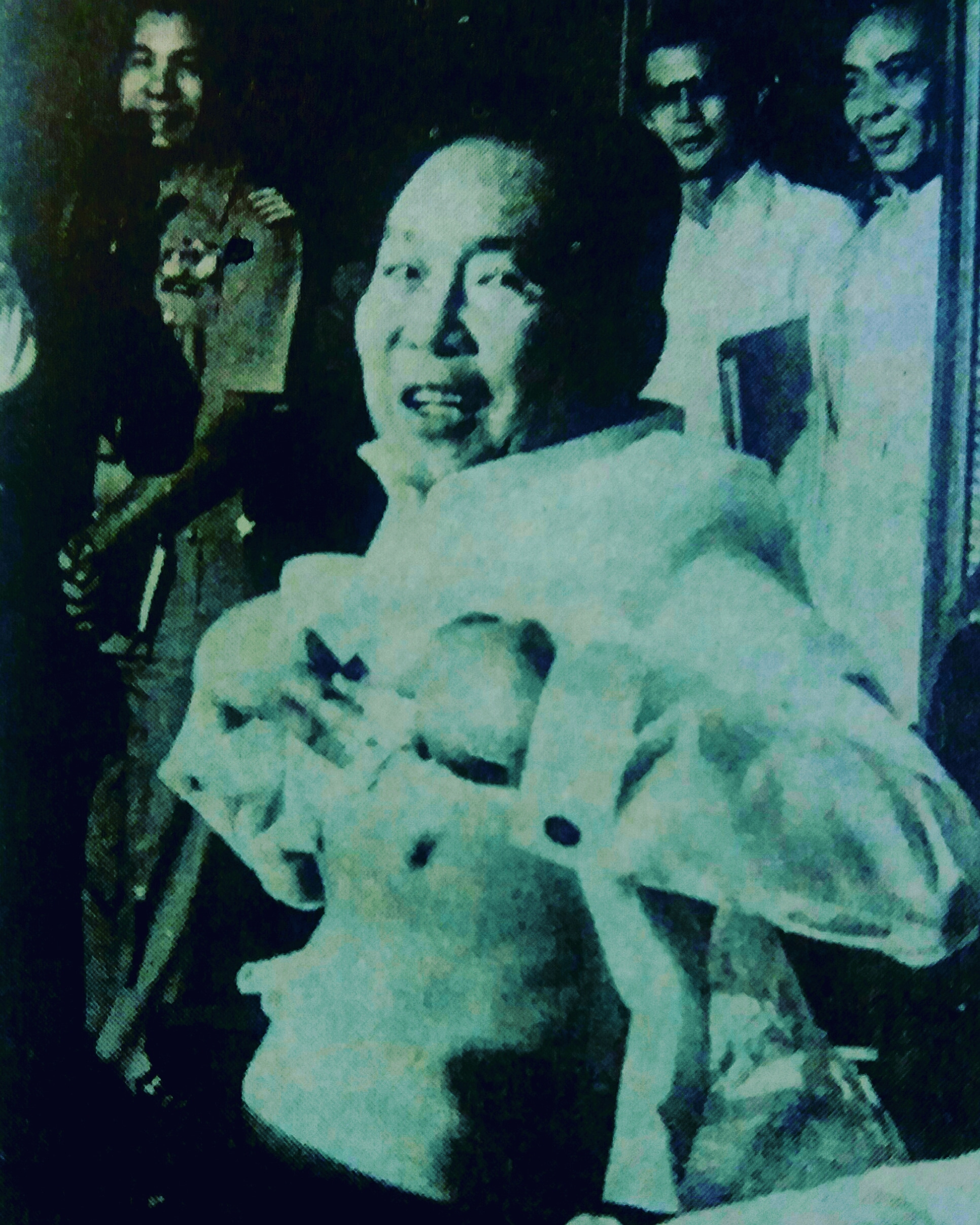
Ferdinand Marcos at a 1980s press conference, where he denied rumors that he was sick; he turned out to be suffering from complications due to lupus.

==== The rise of Ferdinand Marcos ====
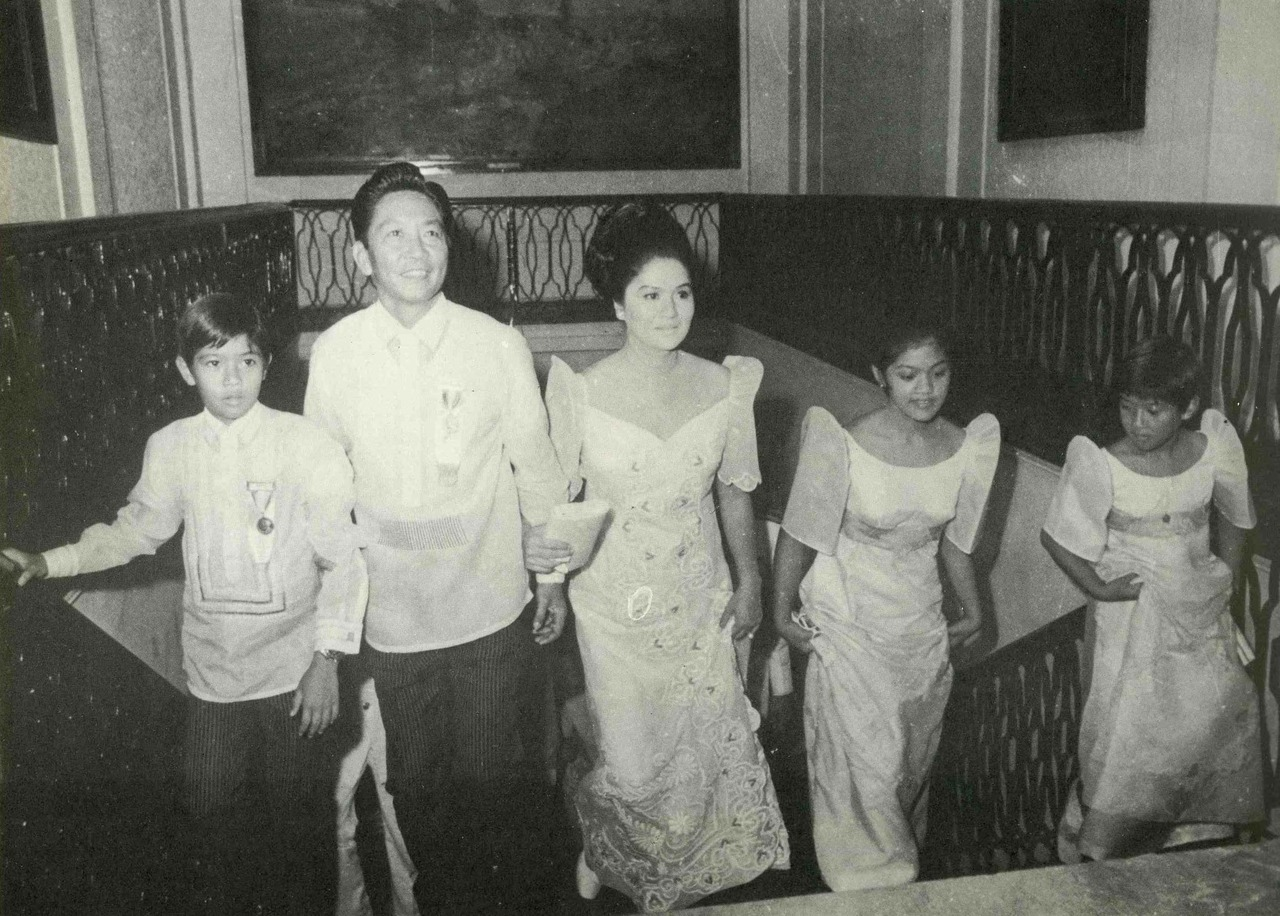
The Marcos family during the 1969 inauguration of then-President Ferdinand Marcos

Because the Nalundasan murder trial resulting drew wide public attention in the years immediately prior to the war, Mariano's son Ferdinand was in an ideal political position to enter politics in the postwar years.

Ferdinand Marcos's rise to power was dramatic. He served three terms in Mariano's own former position as the Philippine House of Representatives as the Congressman for the second district of Ilocos Norte, from 1949 to 1959. Between 1959 and 1965, he served in the Philippine Senate, where he became Senate President until he won the Philippine Presidential Election of 1965 to become the tenth president of the Philippines, staying in the position for 21 years despite the eight year (two four year terms) limitation set by the 1935 Constitution of the Philippines by placing the country under Martial Law in 1972.

Ferdinand Marcos's political prominence would pave the way for other members of the Marcos family to be appointed or elected to various national elections - what would eventually become known as the Marcos dynasty.

==== Dovie Beams and the expansion of the Conjugal Dictatorship ====
Some time in 1968, Ferdinand Marcos began an affair with Nashville actress Dovie Beams. When Marcos got tired of the dalliance in early 1970 and broke up with Beams, the actress released audio tapes of herself and President Marcos. Author Seagrave recounts that: Student protesters at the University of the Philippines commandeered the campus radio station and broadcast a looped tape; soon the entire nation was listening in astonishment to President Marcos begging Dovie Beams to perform oral sex. For over a week the President's hoarse injunctions boomed out over university loudspeakers.

Historians note that Ferdinand Marcos's president's wife Imelda Marcos reacted to the humiliation by aggressively pursuing government positions. This was later confirmed by Economic Planning Minister Gerardo Sicat in his biography of Prime Minister Cesar Virata, where he recounted that the creation of the Metro Manila Commission and the appointment of Imelda Marcos as its head in the position of governor of Metro Manila was a direct result of Marcos attempting to placate his wife's tantrums after the Dovie Beams affair.

Imelda Marcos held the position until the Marcos family was deposed in 1986, and would later be concurrently appointed to the Marcos cabinet as Minister of Human Settlements from 1978 to 1986. In addition, she was elected as Assemblyman for Region IV-A to the Batasang Pambansa from 1978 to 1984.

==== Stolen wealth of the Marcos family ====
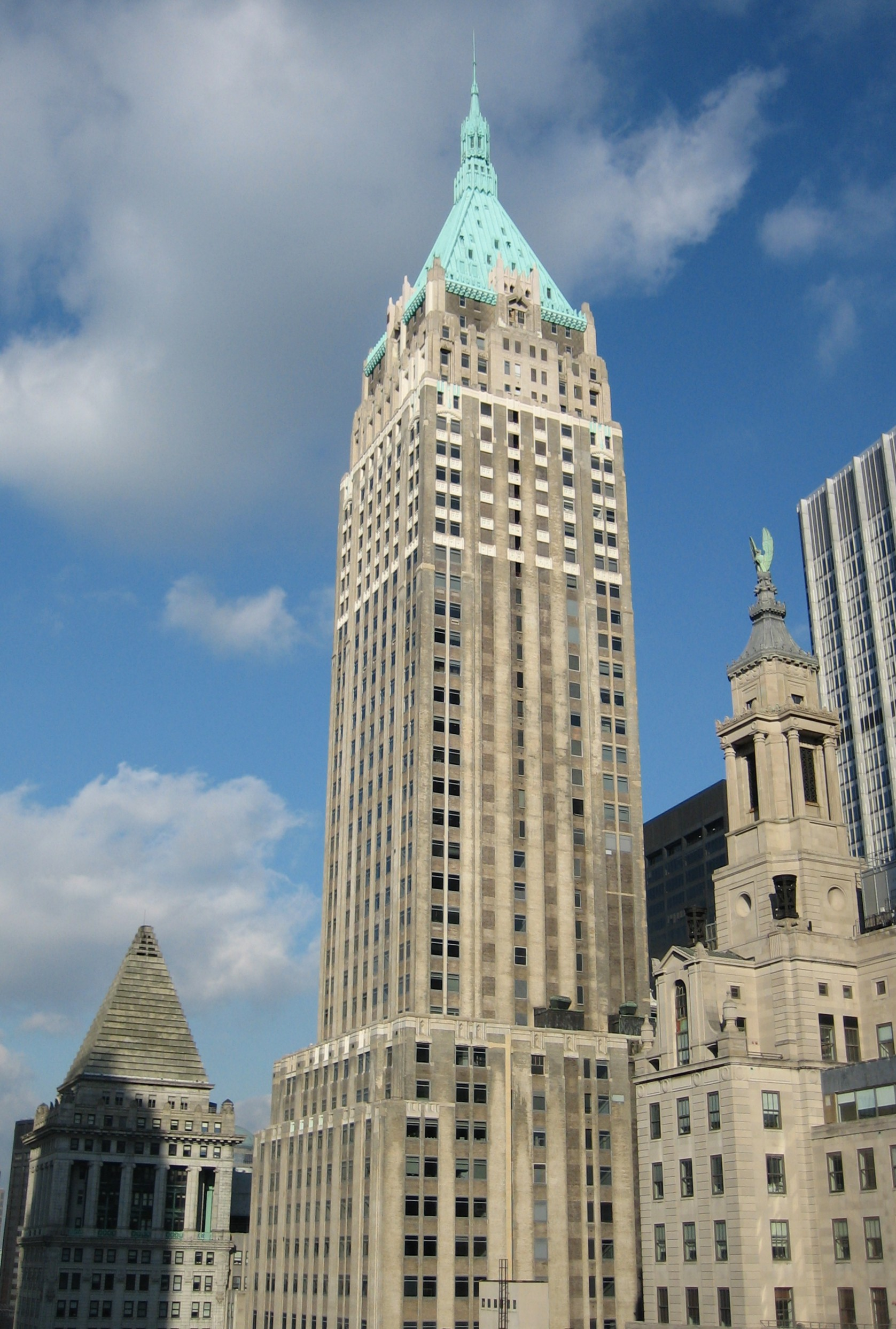
A 2005 image of 40 Wall Street, one of four Manhattan buildings purchased by the Marcoses in the early 1980s.

The Marcos family, a political family in the Philippines, owns different assets that Philippine courts have determined to have been acquired through illicit means during the presidency of Ferdinand Marcos from 1965–1986. These assets are referred to using several terms, including "ill-gotten wealth" and "unexplained wealth," while some authors such as Belinda Aquino and Philippine Senator Jovito Salonga more bluntly refer to it as the "Marcos Plunder".

Legally, the Philippine Supreme Court defines this as the assets the Marcoses acquired beyond the amount legally declared by Ferdinand and Imelda Marcos in the president's statements of assets and liabilities—which amounts to only about US$13,500.00 from his salary as president. The court also deems that such wealth should be forfeited and turned over to the government or to the human rights victims of Marcos's authoritarian regime. Estimates of the amount the Marcoses reportedly acquired in the last few years of the Marcos administration range from US$5 billion to $13 billion. No exact figures can be determined for the amount acquired through the entire 21 years of the Marcos regime, but prominent Marcos-era economist Jesus Estanislao has suggested that the amount could be as high as US$30 billion.

Among the sources of the Marcos wealth are alleged to be: diverted foreign economic aid (e.g. Marcos Japanese ODA scandal), US Government military aid (including huge discretionary funds at Marcos disposal as a "reward" for sending some Filipino troops to Vietnam) and kickbacks from public works contracts over a two-decades-long rule.

This wealth includes: real estate assets both within the Philippines and in several other countries, notably the United States; collections of jewelry and artwork; shares and other financial instruments; bank accounts, both in the Philippines and overseas, notably Switzerland, the United States, Singapore, and the British Virgin Islands; and in some instances, actual cash assets.

Some of this wealth has been recovered as the result of various court cases, either as funds or properties returned to the Philippine government, or by being awarded as reparations to the victims of human rights abuses under Marcos's presidency. Philippine Supreme Court, Sandiganbayan, and courts abroad have issued convictions or rulings that confirm the plunder of Ferdinand Marcos and Imelda Marcos, Marcos family members, and cronies. Some of the stolen wealth has been recovered by the Philippine government through settlements and compromise deals, either with the Marcoses themselves or with cronies who said that certain properties had been entrusted to them by the Marcoses. Some of the recovery cases have been dismissed by the courts for reasons including improper case filing procedures and technical issues with documentary evidence. An unknown amount is not recoverable because the full extent of the Marcos wealth is unknown.

==== The other Marcoses ====
Ferdinand Marcos was known for favoring family members with business concessions. He gave relatives government-related jobs, often putting them in charge of agencies or government-owned corporations with cash incomes.

Ferdinand's sister Elizabeth Marcos-Keon became governor of Ilocos Norte from 1971 to 1983. The Marcos couple's firstborn, Imee Marcos, was appointed chair of the Kabataang Barangay from 1975 to 1986, and was assemblyman to the Batasang Pambansa for Ilocos Norte from 1984 to 1986. Secondborn Bongbong Marcos become vice governor of Ilocos Norte from 1980 to 1983 and governor of that same province from 1983 to 1986.

His brother Pacifico Marcos was placed in charge of Medicare, which collects compulsory insurance contributions from Philippine workers. By 1979, he also controlled at least 14 private corporations involved in mining, coconut refining, and management consulting.

Fortuna Marcos Barba and her husband Marcelino Barba are said to have made a fortune from government logging concessions given to her by Ferdinand Marcos. Fortuna owned four undeveloped lots in the fashionable April Sound subdivision on Lake Conroe in Texas, in the United States. The lots were suspected of being purchased with money stolen from the Philippine treasury. Fortuna Barba was the last surviving sister of Ferdinand Marcos until her death in March 2018.

=== The People Power Revolution, and the exile of the Marcoses (1986–1991) ===
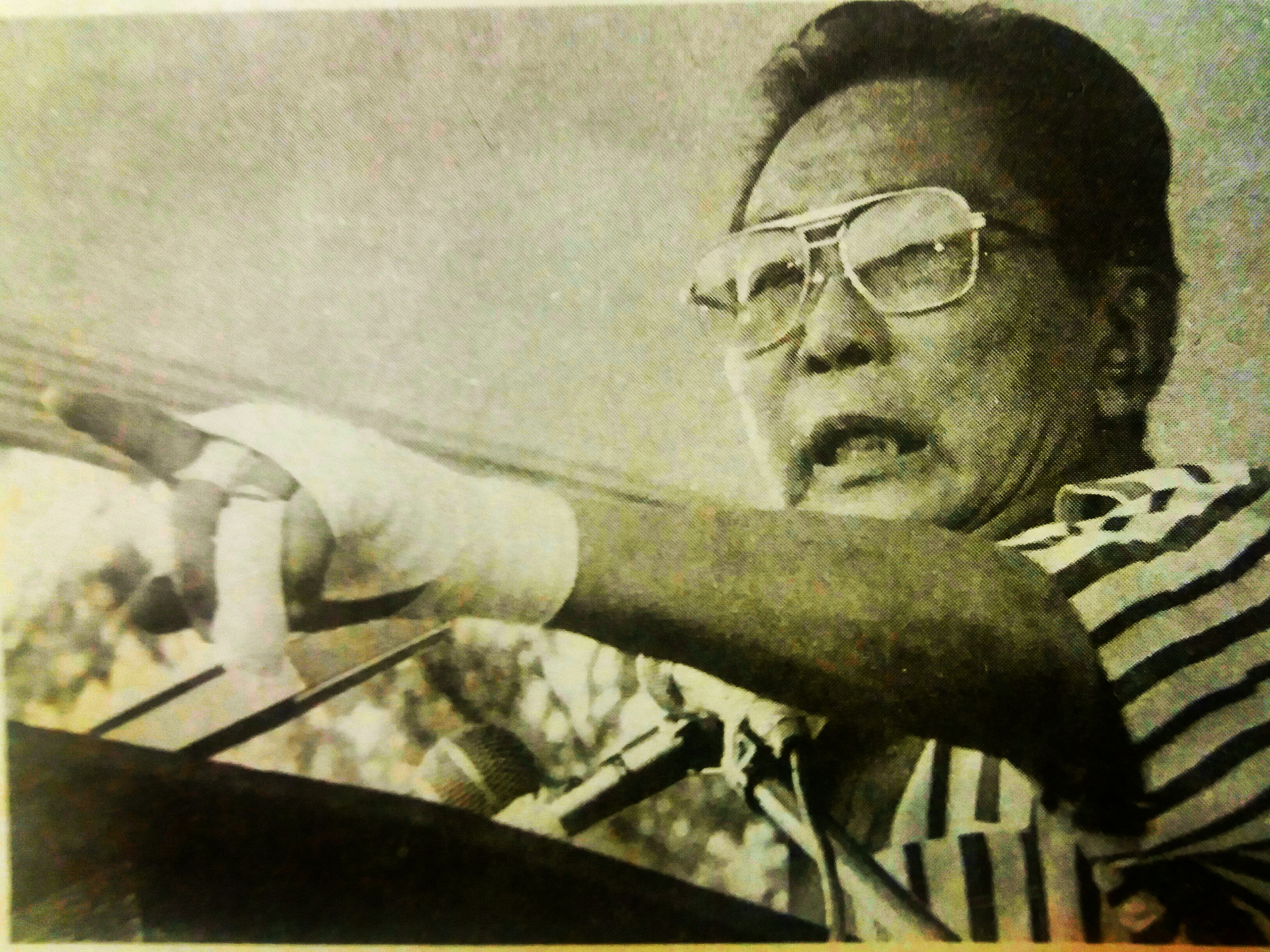
Ferdinand Marcos campaigning for president in the 1986 Snap elections.

As a result of the economic collapse brought about by the assassination of Ninoy Aquino in 1983, the Marcos family was removed from power by civilian protests during the 1986 People Power Revolution.

Fearful of a scenario in which Marcos's presence in the Philippines would lead to a civil war, the Reagan administration withdrew its support for the Marcos government, and flew Marcos and a party of about 80 individuals—the extended Marcos family and a number of close associates—from the Philippines to Hawaiʻi. All the Marcos children—Imee, Marcos Jr., Irene, and young Aimee—were on the flight.

The exiles stayed at Hickam Air Force Base at the expense of the U.S. Government. A month later, the Marcoses moved into a pair of residences in Makiki Heights in Honolulu, which were registered to Marcos cronies Antonio Floirendo and Bienvenido and Gliceria Tantoco.

President Corazon Aquino eventually allowed members of the Marcos family to return to the Philippines after the death of Ferdinand Marcos, supposedly so they could face various corruption charges.

=== Return of the Marcoses (1991–present) ===
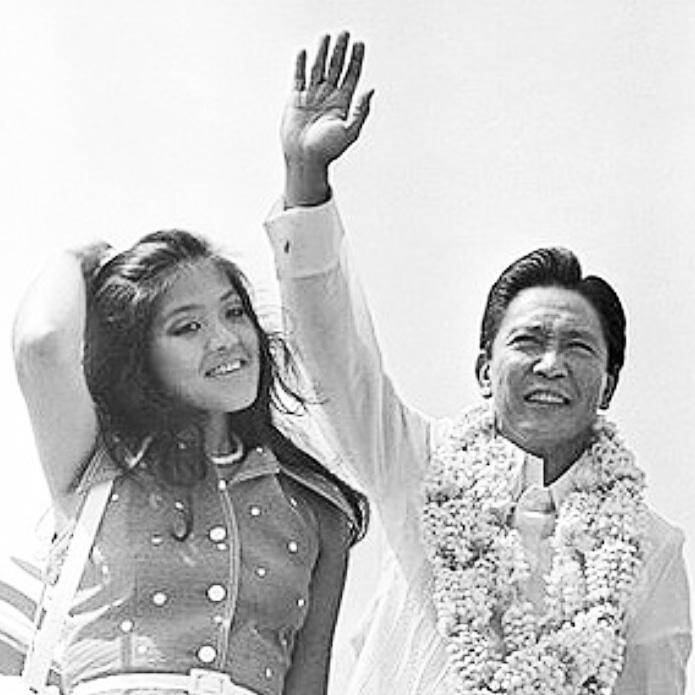
Imee Marcos with her father Ferdinand some time during the latter's 21-year reign as Philippine president.

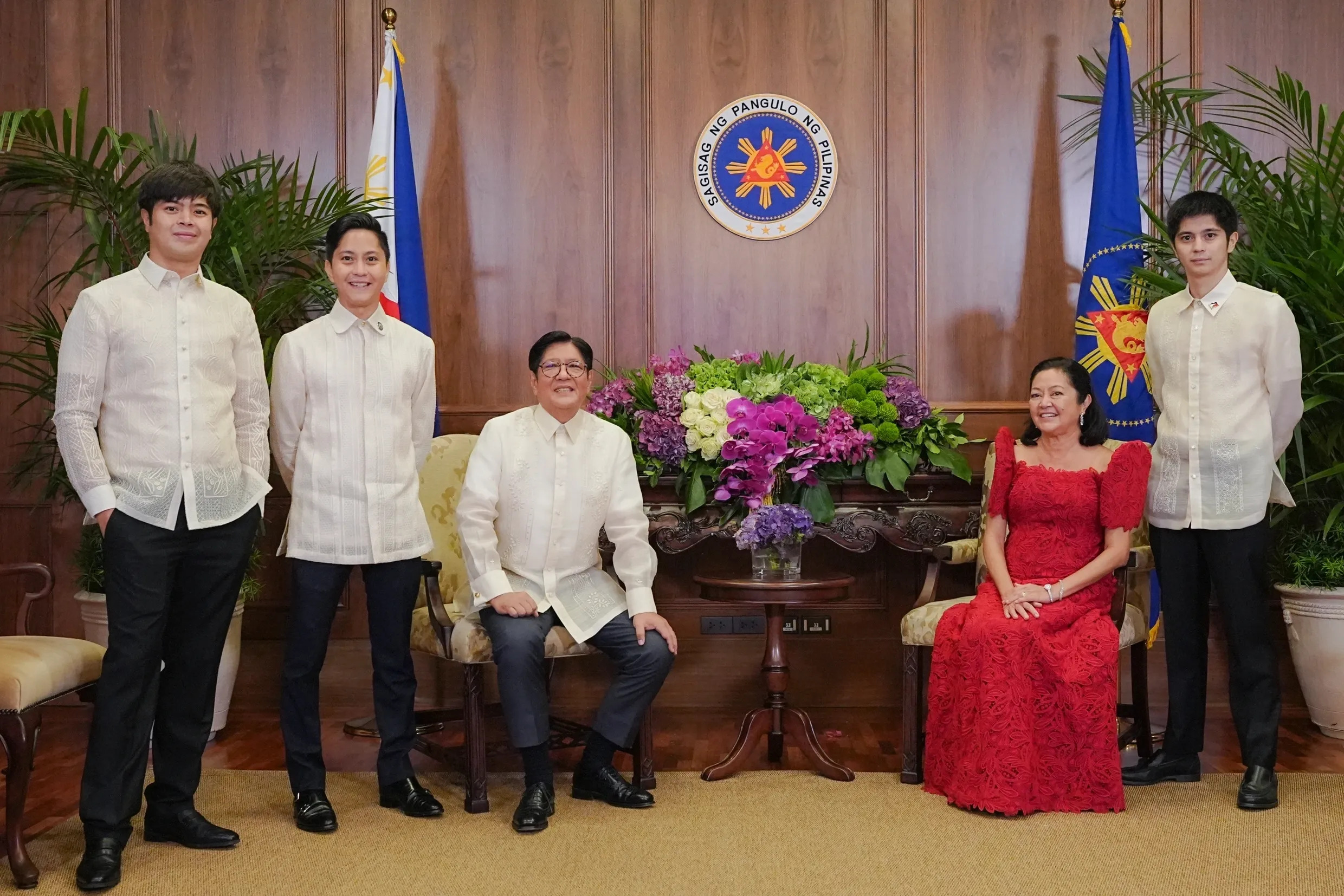
Family portrait of the Marcos family in 2025

==== Political offices after returning to the Philippines ====
Within a year of returning to the Philippines, Imelda Marcos was running for president in the 1992 Philippine presidential election, finishing 5th out of 7 candidates. In that same year, Marcos Jr. ran in a much smaller local election rather than a national race, easily regaining the family's traditional post of Congressman for the Second District of Ilocos Norte. Since then, Imelda, Bongbong, and Imee Marcos have run for numerous posts, alternatingly winning posts including the house seat for the Second District of Ilocos Norte, the house seat for the Second District of Ilocos Norte, the governorship of Ilocos Norte. Bongbong Marcos became a Senator from 2010 to 2016, and ran for the post of Vice President during the 2016 Philippine presidential election, but narrowly lost to Vice President Leni Robredo. Following his defeat, he filed an electoral protest, which was dismissed in 2021 following a recount that had begun since 2018. He later ran for President in the 2022 Philippine presidential election and won by a landslide over Robredo, marking the return of the Marcoses in the office after 36 years. As of February 2025, nine court cases on the Marcoses' stolen wealth were dismissed during the presidency of Bongbong Marcos.

==== Marcos historical distortion ====
Historians, journalists, other observers of Philippine politics have noted that the political rehabilitation of the Marcoses has been made possible through "historical distortion"—a systematic effort to revise the public's perception of the history of martial law and the Marcos administration.

Philippine government, civil society, and academic institutions such as the National Historical Commission of the Philippines, the University of the Philippines Diliman Department of History, the Ateneo de Manila University, the Center for Media Freedom and Responsibility, the Philippine Commission on Human Rights, and the Philippine government's Presidential Commission on Good Government say that the Marcos revisionist techniques or narratives perpetuated include:

- denial or downplaying of the tortures and murders that took place during martial law;
- the myth that the Marcos period was a "golden age" rather than a period of debt-driven growth and corruption-triggered collapse;
- the myth that all the victims of martial law were communists or communist sympathizers; and
- the myth that the children of Ferdinand Marcos, who reached the age of the majority a few years after the declaration of martial law—were too young to know about the abuses of the martial law era.

Some historiographers such as Filomeno Aguilar Jr. attribute the rise of Marcos revisionism to the lack of comprehensive, in-depth scholarly work on the history of the Marcos family and of Martial Law. While there is a significant body of scholarly literature on these subjects, it mostly takes the form of collections of papers, rather than comprehensive scholarly works.

==== Flood control projects scandal ====
Despite laws prohibiting contractors from giving campaign donations, Rodulfo Hilot Jr. of Rudhil Construction & Enterprises gave a ₱20-million campaign donation to Bongbong Marcos, while Jonathan Quirante of Quirante Construction donated ₱1 million. Both companies were awarded substantial government contracts since Marcos's election as president in 2022. In 2024, Rudhil was awarded a contract for a ₱243-million sewage treatment plant project for the Philippine Ports Authority, in addition to its contracts with the DPWH. Quirante's firm was awarded a ₱3-billion contract in 2023, with its contracts totaling ₱3.8 billion by 2025.

House Speaker Martin Romualdez and his ally and former appropriations chair Zaldy Co drew criticism over alleged involvement in the 2025 General Appropriations Act (GAA), which opponents denounced as one of the most flawed and corrupt spending measures ever approved. From 2023 to 2025, Romualdez, a cousin of President Bongbong Marcos, received ₱14.4 billion of "allocable" funds from the 2025 GAA, the second highest amount approved by Congress for its members in the House of Representatives. The President's son Representative Sandro Marcos got the highest fund allocation at ₱15.8 billion. A Philippine Center for Investigative Journalism report that investigated the national budget described Martin Romualdez and Sandro Marcos as the "pork barrel kings".

"Allocable" funds in the national budget approved by Congress have been criticized by the People's Budget Coalition as a new form of pork barrel, since these go to "politically determined projects that crowd out more equitable and accountable public spending". Unprogrammed appropriations (UA) and confidential and intelligence fund (CIF) under the Office of the President were also tagged as forms of corruption-prone pork barrel funds. In the National Expenditure Program proposed by the Office of the President for 2026, the President will get the bulk of the total CIF at ₱4.5 billion. Makabayan lawmakers estimate that "allocables" comprise ₱230 million for each congress representative and ₱3.2 billion for each senator in the upcoming 2026 budget. Despite accusations that he got billions of pesos in kickbacks in the flood control scandal, former House Speaker Martin Romualdez was given ₱6 billion out of ₱500 billion in "allocable" and "non-allocable" DPWH funds in the upcoming national budget program for 2026.

At a House of Representatives corruption probe on September 8, 2025, contractor Curlee Discaya implicated Romualdez in alleged kickbacks from public works contracts. Romualdez formally resigned as speaker on September 17, 2025. During a Senate Blue Ribbon Committee hearing on September 25, 2025, Orly Guteza testified that he regularly delivered luggage filled with cash to Romualdez's residence while working as a security aide to Zaldy Co. The amount allegedly delivered to Romualdez was an estimated ₱1.68 billion. In November 2025, Zaldy Co alleged that Romualdez and President Marcos got billions of pesos in kickbacks from flood-control projects. Co accused former Marcos aide Jojo Cadiz of being Marcos's bagman. Cadiz is also linked to JSJ Builders Inc, which was awarded ₱251 million worth of flood control and road projects in the Marcoses' home province of Ilocos Norte.

On September 30, the Department of Justice (DOJ) said that it was investigating Romualdez in connection with the flood control corruption scandal. The DOJ issued an immigration lookout order on October 8 against Romualdez and senators Francis Escudero, Joel Villanueva, Jinggoy Estrada, upon the request of the Independent Commission for Infrastructure.

On December 18, Department of Public Works and Highways recommended the filing of charges for plunder, malversation, graft and bribery against Romualdez and 86 other people. The Independent Commission for Infrastructure also recommended the filing of plunder, graft, and bribery charges against Romualdez and Zaldy Co before the Office of the Ombudsman. House Deputy Minority Leader Antonio Tinio (ACT party-list), House Assistant Minority Leader Renee Co (Kabataan party-list), and Gabriela party-list Representative Sarah Elago filed House Resolution 515 calling for a legislative probe on Bongbong Marcos, Sandro Marcos, former Executive Secretary Lucas Bersamin, and other officials with alleged links to the flood control corruption controversy, and as such Bersamin was fired by Marcos. The Ombudsman said that it will investigate Sandro Marcos and Romualdez in relation to pork barrel funds that they got from the national budget.

In Ilocos Norte, the Guillen family, a local ally of the Marcoses, are contractors who have been awarded government projects in towns where they are also elected officials. The Guillen-Salazar family owns companies that have been top DPWH contractors since 2016. These companies are Dylan Equipment Construction and Supplies with ₱415.8 million worth of DPWH projects, North Tech Builders and Construction Supply with ₱372.3 million in DPWH projects, and Skyline Construction Equipment and Development Corporation, with ₱368.4 million in DPWH projects. Bongbong Marcos appointed contractor Eddie Guillen to head the National Irrigation Administration in 2022 to replace Benny Antiporda.

During the Marcos administration, from 2022 to 2025, the value of flood-control projects in some provinces and cities increased by 6 to 8 times, such as in Bulacan and Cebu. In Marcos's home province of Ilocos Norte, flood control projects jumped from ₱463.67 million in 2022 to ₱8.72 billion in 2025. In Romualdez's home province of Leyte, flood-control projects rose from ₱2.17 billion to ₱10.06 billion. In Romualdez's congressional district, billions of pesos in DPWH contracts were awarded to Zaldy Co's Sunwest Inc. Some flood-prone areas in other parts of the Philippines got less funds and projects. In January 2026, the Makabayan lawmakers filed an impeachment complaint in the House of Representatives for the betrayal of public trust relating to corruption allegations on the government's flood control projects. In July 2026, the Office of the Ombudsman said that it was filing plunder charges against Romualdez, whom the office identified as a "central figure" in the flood control corruption scandal. In October 2026, Romualdez and Co were charged by the Ombudsman for repeatedly getting kickbacks and other benefits worth over ₱7.44 billion.

== Political positions held ==
=== Presidents and spouses ===
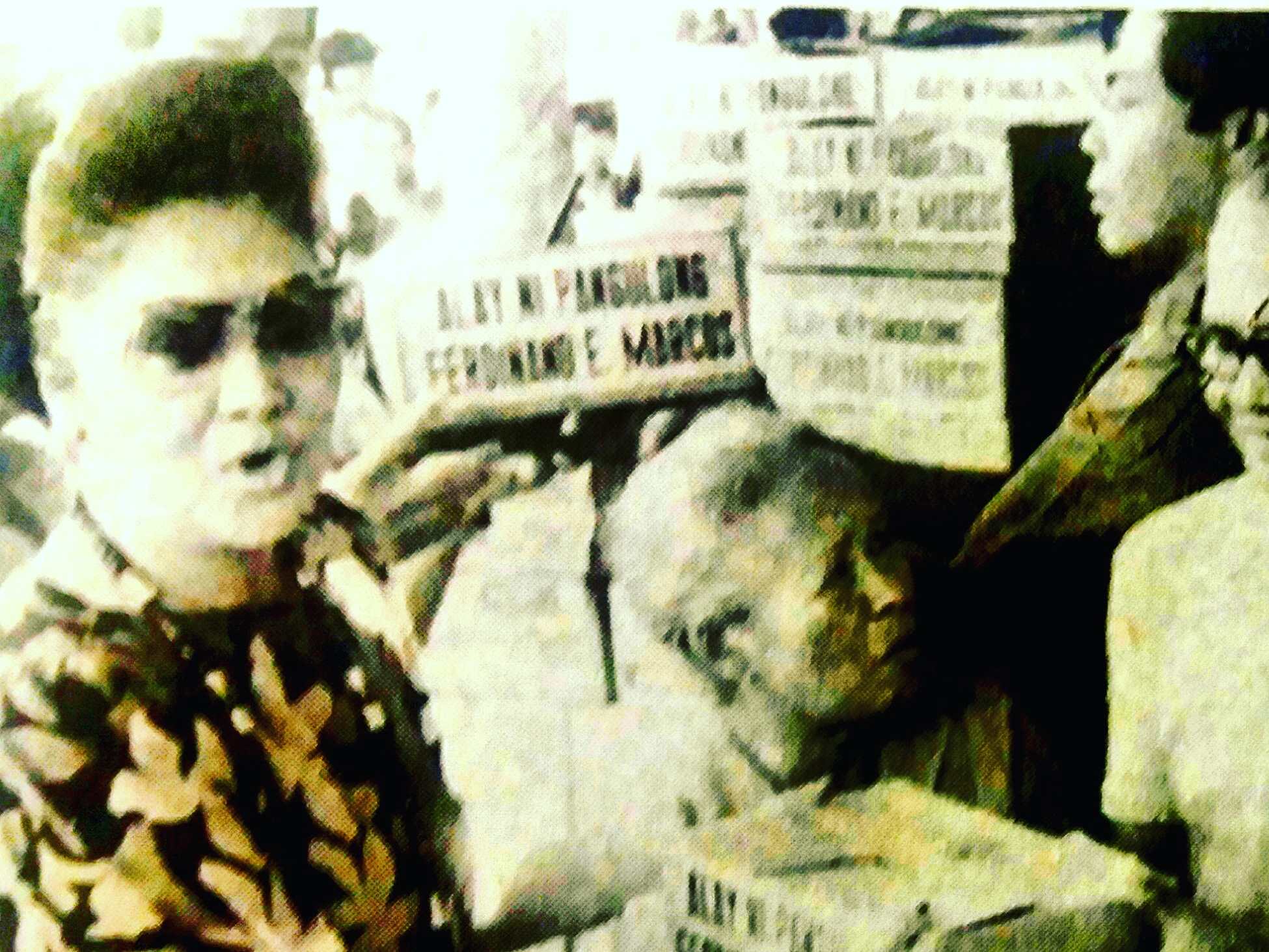
Imelda Marcos at a food doleout event during the waning days of the Marcos dictatorship. Although this took place at a government event, the text of the sign reads: "offered by President Ferdinand Marcos."

- Ferdinand Marcos: Member of the Philippine House of Representatives from Ilocos Norte's Second District (1949–1959); member of the Philippine Senate (1959—1965); tenth president of the Philippines (1965–1986). The rule of Ferdinand Marcos and his wife Imelda has been called a "conjugal dictatorship" that stole up to an estimated $10 billion to finance the couple's extravagant lifestyle.
- Bongbong Marcos: Vice governor of Ilocos Norte (1980–1983); governor of Ilocos Norte (1983–1986); member of the Philippine House of Representatives from Ilocos Norte's Second District (1992–1995); governor of Ilocos Norte (1998–2007); Senator of the Philippines (2010–2016); seventeenth president of the Philippines (2022-)
- Imelda Marcos (by affinity): Governor of Metropolitan Manila (1975–1986); Mambabatas Pambansa from Region IV-A (1978–1984); unsuccessful candidate for President in 1992; member of the Philippine House of Representatives from Leyte's First District (1995–1998); member of the Philippine House of Representatives from Ilocos Norte's Second District (2010–2016). She was convicted of 7 counts of graft and corruption by the Sandiganbayan anti-graft court on November 9, 2018. The word "Imeldific" was coined to describe her extravagance, greed, and frivolity.
- Louise Araneta-Marcos: wife of Bongbong Marcos; First Lady of the Philippines (2022-)

=== Senators ===
- Imee Marcos: Assemblyman from Ilocos Norte (1984–1986); member of the Philippine House of Representatives from the second district of Ilocos Norte (1998–2007); governor of Ilocos Norte (2010–2019); member of the Philippine Senate (2019–present). A US court ruled in 1991 that Imee Marcos was liable for the death of student Archimedes Trajano.

=== House Representatives ===
- Mariano Marcos: Member of the Philippine House of Representatives from Ilocos Norte's Second District (1925—1931).
- Angelo Marcos Barba: Member of the Philippines House of Representatives from Ilocos Norte's Second District (2019–present).
- Ferdinand Alexander "Sandro" Marcos III: Member of the Philippines House of Representatives from Ilocos Norte's First District (2022–present).

=== Governors ===
- Elizabeth Marcos-Keon: Governor of Ilocos Norte (1971–1983)
- Michael Marcos Keon: Board Member of Ilocos Norte (2004–2007); governor of Ilocos Norte (2007–2010); mayor of Laoag (2019–2025)
- Matthew Marcos Manotoc: Senior Board Member, 2nd District of Ilocos Norte (2016–2019); governor of Ilocos Norte (2019–2025)
- Cecilia Marcos: governor of Ilocos Norte (2025–present)

== Other prominent members ==
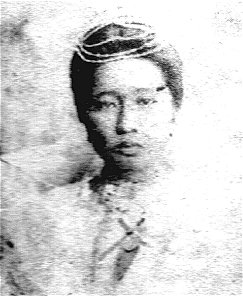
Josefa Edralin Marcos, widow to Mariano Marcos and mother to former President Ferdinand Marcos

- Josefa Edralin Marcos (1893-1988): born Josefa Quetulio Edralin to Don Fructuoso Edralin y Carpio and Doña Emerenciana Quetulio y Taganas; was a school teacher and widow of Mariano and mother to Ferdinand; reputed to have served as chairperson of the board of more than a dozen companies during Ferdinand's 20-year presidency; left behind by the Marcoses at the Philippine Heart Center when they fled the country in February 1986; Died in 1988.
- Irene Marcos-Araneta: The third of the Marcos siblings and the last biological child of Ferdinand and Imelda Marcos.
- Aimee Marcos: The adopted daughter of Ferdinand and Imelda Marcos. Known as "Little Aimee", treated as the couple's bunso (lastborn); the only member of the Marcos family to still be a minor when Martial Law was formally lifted in 1981, and when the Marcoses were deposed in 1986; drummer for indie band "The Dorques."
- Andres Avelino Marcos Barba: Son of Col. Marcelino Barba and Fortuna Edralin Marcos, sister of Ferdinand Marcos. Avelino Barba's bodyguard allegedly shot and killed 17-year old Apolinario Buendia while Avelino Barba allegedly shot Buendia's parents during a fight over a girls volleyball match in Makati City in July 1978.
- Paolo Bediones: Paolo, only male child among four offspring, was born to Rodolfo Pineda Bediones (from Roxas City, Capiz) and Maria Teresa Barba who separated when Paolo was still young. His mother Maria is the daughter of Fortuna Marcos-Barba (Paolo's maternal grandmother) who's the sister of the late President Ferdinand Marcos (Paolo's maternal granduncle)
- Fernando Martin "Borgy" Marcos Manotoc: The son of Imee Marcos-Manotoc, a commercial model and entrepreneur.
- Analisa Josefa Hegyesi Corr: The Australian-raised daughter of Ferdinand Marcos and former Sydney model, Evelin Hegyesi. Her second given name was taken after her grandmother, Ferdinand's mother, Josefa Edralin. Analisa is an accomplished interior designer; completing projects in London, Singapore, Sydney and Port Douglas, a commercial photographer, a successful residential property developer and dedicated equestrian; having competed in eventing, namely dressage and showjumping, around Australia and in England. Her mother Evelyn is the beneficiary of a foundation Marcos set up, according to documents on Swiss bank accounts holding funds stolen from the Philippine treasury.

== Summary table ==
Marcos family
Birth	Death	Image	Name	Relationship to Ferdinand Marcos	Nationality	Office	Occupation	Ref
April 21, 1897	March 8, 1945		Mariano Marcos	Father of Ferdinand Marcos	Filipino	Representative of Ilocos Norte's 2nd district	Politician, lawyer, and educator	
1893	1988		Josefa Edralin Marcos	Mother of Ferdinand Marcos	Filipino		Teacher	
September 11, 1917	September 28, 1989		Ferdinand Marcos	Himself	Filipino	President of the Philippines	Politician, jurist, and lawyer	
October 19, 1918	May 22, 2006		Michael Keon	Ex brother in law of Ferdinand Marcos (By Elizabeth)	Australian		Journalist and author	
January 30, 1919	January 10, 1998		Pacifico Marcos	Brother of Ferdinand Marcos	Filipino		Medical doctor	
1921	1986		Elizabeth Marcos-Keon	Sister of Ferdinand Marcos	Filipino	Governor of Ilocos Norte	Politician	
July 2, 1929	Alive		Imelda Marcos	Wife of Ferdinand Marcos	Filipino	First Lady of the Philippines	Politician	
1931	March 3, 2018		Fortuna Marcos-Barba	Sister of Ferdinand Marcos	Filipino			
August 9, 1949	Alive		Tommy Manotoc	Ex son in law of Ferdinand Marcos (By Imee)	Filiipino		Golfer and former basketball coach	
September 22, 1954	Alive		Michael Marcos Keon	Nephew of Ferdinand Marcos	Australian-Filipino		Politician	
November 12, 1955	Alive		Imee Marcos	Daughter of Ferdinand Marcos	Filipino	Senator of the Philippines	Politician and film producer	
September 13, 1957	Alive		Bongbong Marcos	Son of Ferdinand Marcos	Filipino	President of the Philippines	Politician	
December 13, 1958	Alive		Angelo Barba	Nephew of Ferdinand Marcos	Filipino	Representative of Ilocos Norte's 2nd district		
August 21, 1959	Alive		Liza Araneta Marcos	Daughter in law of Ferdinand Marcos (By Bongbong)	Filipino	First Lady of the Philippines	Lawyer and academic	
September 16, 1960	Alive		Irene Marcos	Daughter of Ferdinand Marcos	Filipino			
	Alive		Gregorio Maria Araneta III	Son in law of Ferdinand Marcos (By Irene)	Filipino		Businessman	
1970 -1972	Alive		Analisa Josefa Hegyesi Corr	Daughter of Ferdinand Marcos	Australian-Filipino		Designer	
	Alive		Jimmy Corr	Son in law of Ferdinand Marcos	Australian		Former soldier	
2003 - 2004	Alive		Tahni Fleming	Granddaughter of Ferdinand Marcos	Australian			
May 2, 1979	Alive		Aimee Marcos	Daughter of Ferdinand Marcos	Filipino		Musician	
	Alive		Cid Bernado	Son in law of Ferdinand Marcos (By Aimee)	Filipino	PHIVIDEC Industrial Authority’s Administrator and CEO	Lawyer	
April 9, 1983	Alive		Borgy Manotoc	Grandson of Ferdinand Marcos (By Imee)	Filipino		Model	
September 4, 1983 - 1987	Alive		Mike Manotoc	Grandson of Ferdinand Marcos (By Imee)	Filipino		Lawyer	
December 9, 1988	Alive		Matthew Manotoc	Grandson of Ferdinand Marcos (By Imee)	Filipino	Vice Governor of Ilocos Norte	Politician, athlete, and sports manager	
March 7, 1994	Alive		Sandro Marcos	Grandson of Ferdinand Marcos (By Bongbong)	Filipino	Majority Leader of the House of Representatives	Politician	
July 12, 1994	Alive		Jamie Herrell	Granddaughter in law of Ferdinand Marcos (By Matthew)	Filipino-American		Journalist and beauty queen	
November 25, 1995	Alive		Simon Marcos	Grandson of Ferdinand Marcos (By Bongbong)	Filipino			
May 17, 1997	Alive		Vinny Marcos	Grandson of Ferdinand Marcos (By Bongbong)	Filipino			
	Alive		Luis Marcos Araneta	Grandson of Ferdinand Marcos (By Irene)	Filipino		Businessman	
	Alive		Xandra Rocha	Granddaughter in law of Ferdinand Marcos (By Luis)	Filipino		TV show host	
	Alive		Alfonso Marcos Araneta	Grandson of Ferdinand Marcos (By Irene)	Filipino			

== See also ==
- List of political families in the Philippines
- Julio Nalundasan
- Implementation of Martial law under Ferdinand Marcos
- Marcos loyalism
- Philippine Constitutional Convention of 1971
- Archimedes Trajano
- 1987 Constitution of the Philippines
- Cacique democracy
- Martin Romualdez
