= Manuel Araneta Jr. =

Filipino basketball player

Personal information
- Born: December 8, 1926 Jaro, Iloilo Philippine Islands
- Died: July 4, 2003 (aged 76) Laoag, Ilocos Norte, Philippines
- Listed height: 6 ft 1 in (185 cm)

Career information
- College: FEU; Mapua; De La Salle

Career history
- 1940s: Philippine Air Lines

Manuel "Manolet" Ledesma Araneta Jr. (December 8, 1926 – July 4, 2003) was a Filipino basketball player who competed in the 1948 Summer Olympics. Araneta Jr. was the father of Liza Araneta-Marcos, wife of Philippine president Bongbong Marcos.

== Early life ==
Araneta Jr. was born on December 8, 1926, in Jaro, Iloilo (now part of Iloilo City) but grew up in Bago, Negros Occidental

== Career ==
Araneta would be a player for Iloilo City-based Colegio de San Agustin prior to the outbreak of World War II. He played in the Knights of Columbus league during the Japanese occupation at Real Colegio de Santa Isabel in Manila.

He would also suit up for Mapua Institute of Technology, Far Eastern University, and De La Salle University. At the Manila Industrial Commercial Athletic Association, Araneta played for Philippine Air Lines. He was named Most Valuable Player for the team in 1947.

Araneta would play for the Philippines national team at the 1948 Summer Olympics in London where the team placed tenth.

== Death ==
He died on July 4, 2003.
