= Michael Marcos Keon =

Filipino politician

The Honourable Michael Marcos Keon
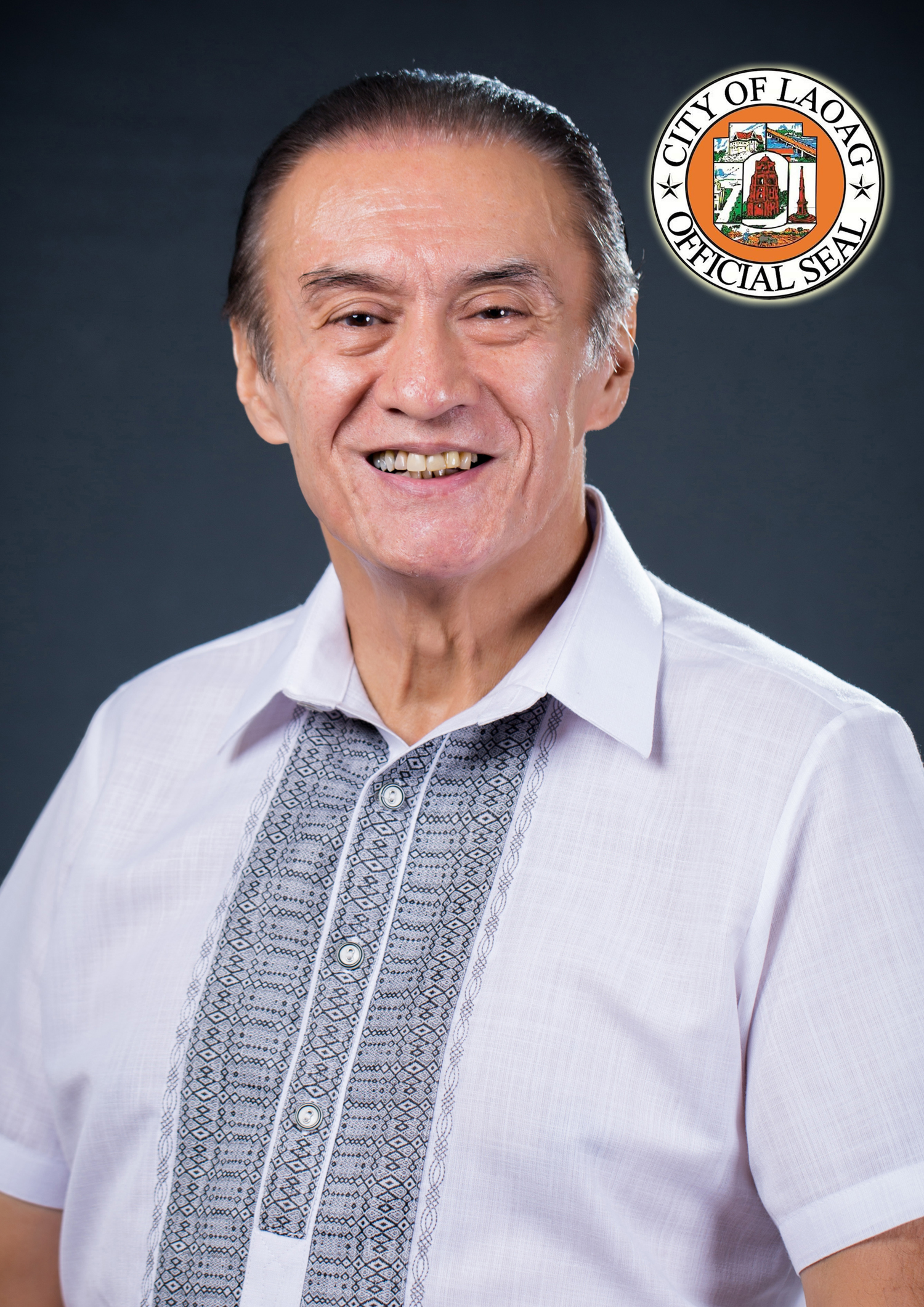

Mayor of Laoag
- In office June 30, 2019 – June 30, 2025
- Vice Mayor: Vicentito M. Lazo (2019–2022); Rey Carlos V. Fariñas (2022–2025)
- Preceded by: Chevylle V. Fariñas
- Succeeded by: James Bryan Alcid

Member of the Laoag City Council
- In office 2018–2019

25th Governor of Ilocos Norte
- In office June 30, 2007 – June 30, 2010
- Vice Governor: Windell D. Chua
- Preceded by: Bongbong Marcos
- Succeeded by: Imee Marcos

4th President of the Philippine Olympic Committee
- In office 1981–1984
- Preceded by: Julian Malonso (provisional)
- Succeeded by: Jose Sering

Personal details
- Born: Michael Edward Marcos Keon; September 22, 1954 (age 72) Rome, Italy
- Party: Independent (2021–present); Nacionalista (2018–2021); Lakas (before 2007; 2008–2010); KAMPI (2007–2008)
- Spouse: Simonette Soriano
- Relations: Marcos family
- Parent(s): Michael Keon; Elizabeth Marcos
- Education: University of the Philippines Diliman (BA)
- Known for: First Executive Director of Project Gintong Alay (1979–1986)

Michael Edward Marcos Keon (born September 22, 1954) is a Filipino politician. Keon is the son of Australian journalist Michael James Keon and Elizabeth E. Marcos-Keon, governor of Ilocos Norte from 1971 to 1983 and the nephew of former Philippine president Ferdinand Marcos.

His mother, the first female vice-governor and governor of Ilocos Norte, was the sister of former Philippine president Ferdinand Marcos. His father worked for the United Nations Food and Agricultural Organization and had a hand in setting up the International Rice Research Institute in Los Baños, Laguna. His father also joined the historic 10,000-km. "Long March" with Mao Zedong during the Chinese Communist Revolution, covering the monumental event for the Chicago Daily Tribune.

Before entering politics, Keon worked in the sports sector as director of the Gintong Alay program. This project was launched on October 31, 1979 and was intended to ensure the success of Philippine sports to promote and ultimately to achieve gold medals in international events.

== Political career ==
He served as provincial governor of Ilocos Norte from 2007-2010. He was preceded by cousin, Bongbong Marcos and was succeeded by Imee Marcos.

He initially planned to run as mayor of Laoag for 2013 elections but withdrew after Bongbong Marcos convinced him to withdraw his candidacy in favor of then-ABC President Chevylle V. Fariñas, wife of the then-outgoing Mayor Michael V. Fariñas.

In 2018, Keon was appointed by Ilocos Norte Governor Imee Marcos as Laoag City Councilor to fill in a vacant position in the Laoag City Council.

In 2019 elections, he again ran for the same position; this time with the support of the Marcos clan. He defeated the incumbent mayor Chevylle Fariñas. His victory signaled the end of decades-old rule of the Fariñas clan in the city. However, his subsequent reelection bids in 2022 and 2025 did not receive the support of the Marcoses, who endorsed other candidates instead. In the 2025 election, he lost to city councilor Bryan Alcid.
