= The 7th Dawn =

1964 British film by Lewis Gilbert

- Original film poster by Howard Terpning
- Directed by: Lewis Gilbert
- Written by: Karl Tunberg
- Based on: The Durian Tree by Michael Keon
- Produced by: Charles K. Feldman
- Starring: William Holden; Capucine; Tetsurō Tamba; Susannah York
- Cinematography: Freddie Young
- Edited by: John Shirley; Jeremy Saunders
- Music by: Riz Ortolani
- Distributed by: United Artists
- Release date: 2 September 1964
- Running time: 123 minutes
- Countries: United Kingdom; United States
- Language: English

The 7th Dawn is a 1964 Technicolor drama film directed by Lewis Gilbert and starring William Holden, Capucine and Tetsurō Tamba. The film, set during the Malayan Emergency, is based on the 1960 novel The Durian Tree by Michael Keon and was filmed on location in Malaysia.

== Plot ==
1945: As the Japanese occupiers in Malaya during World War II surrender, three friends who fought in the Resistance emerge from the jungle. Ferris is an American who fought alongside the Malayans. Dhana is a half-French, half-Vietnamese woman Ferris is in love with. Ng is a Communist revolutionary, raised by Dhana's family. They meet Trumpey, the commanding British officer, during the Japanese surrender ceremony. Ng leaves Ferris and Dhana to travel to Moscow for training.

1953: The Malayan communist insurgency erupts as Britain prepares to grant Malaya independence. Ferris is a prosperous rubber plantation owner. Dhana is his mistress and the head of a schoolteacher's union. Ng has returned as a committed revolutionary, commanding Communist partisans attacking British economic interests.

Ferris's friendship with Ng has protected his rubber plantation from attack. British officials ask Ferris to convince Ng to halt his attacks until independence is granted. Ferris journeys to Ng's headquarters, but Ng does not trust the British and refuses. On his return, Ferris meets Trumpey's daughter Candace. Trumpey has returned to Malaya as High Commissioner of the United Kingdom for Malaya. Candace invites Ferris to a party at their residence, the Carcosa Seri Negara. When Ferris arrives there, Dhana is leading a protest of bicycle riders, demanding Trumpey rescind a new law, designed to prevent terrorist attacks, forbidding cyclists to ride at night. Eager to build bridges with the locals, Trumpey agrees. Ferris attends the party and sparks fly with Candace, before a terrorist bombs the event.

Candace tries to seduce Ferris, but he rejects her. In retaliation for the bombing, Trumpey has the bomber's village, where Dhana's school is located, burned down. Dhana is horrified and tells Ng she wants to join his cause. Dhana tells Ferris she is leaving him, but he changes her mind. While riding her bike, the police stop Dhana and find explosives among her groceries. Dhana is arrested as a terrorist, tried and sentenced to death. The British offer deals to Ferris and Dhana. If either tells them the location of Ng's camp, so the British can destroy his forces and kill him, they will pardon Dhana. Dhana and Ferris both refuse to betray their old friend to save her life.

Candace has fallen in love with Ferris and visits Dhana in prison. Dhana asks Candace to help Ferris deal with her death. Candace is moved by this selfless request and convinced Dhana is innocent. She gives herself up to Ng as a hostage, to be traded for Dhana’s life. Ferris decides the only way to save Dhana is to kill Ng. He treks into the jungle to Ng's headquarters. The British authorities give Ferris seven days to find Ng before they will execute Dhana. Candace is horrified to find she was naive. Ng is a zealot who cares more about his ideals than individual life. Candace is now a real prisoner. Ng is perfectly willing to actually kill her if Dhana is executed.

The British learn the location of Ng's camp and attack it, just as Ferris arrives. Ng escapes with Candace. Ferris follows them through the jungle. Ferris rescues Candace and takes Ng prisoner. They trek to the coast. Ferris hopes to bring Ng to the British before Dhana's execution. Ng turns on Ferris. They fight, forcing Candace to shoot Ng. Dying, Ng reveals he planted the explosives in Dhana's bicycle. He sacrificed her, though he loved her, because he knew the death of a beloved community leader would cause protests against the British. Ferris and Candace struggle to bring Trumpey word of Ng's death, before the morning of Dhana's scheduled execution. They nearly reach their goal, but the bridge they must cross gets washed out by floods. Dhana is executed. Ferris and Candace are rescued by the British.

Sometime later, Ferris visits Candace, who is recuperating from her ordeal in the jungle. She professes her love, but he says he is too old for her, and that he must leave Malaya. It reminds him too much of Dhana. Ferris says farewell to Candace and wishes her father good luck dealing with the Malayans, who have already begun protesting about Dhana's death.

== Cast ==
- William Holden as Major Ferris
- Capucine as Dhana Mercier
- Tetsurō Tamba as Ng
- Susannah York as Candace Trumpey
- Michael Goodliffe as Peter Trumpey
- Allan Cuthbertson as Colonel Cavendish
- Maurice Denham as Tarlton
- Sydney Tafler as Police Commissioner Tom
- Beulah Quo as Ah Ming
- Hussein Abu Hassan as Communist Terrorists

== Original novel ==
The Durian Tree was published in 1960. It was written by Australian journalist Michael Keon, and the lead character Ferris was an Australian. The New York Times called it "a serious and ambitious novel" but said Keon was "a good reporter but a poor novelist." The Los Angeles Times called it "suspenseful, provocative, ultimately illuminating." The film rights were bought by Charles K. Feldman.

== Production ==
Lewis Gilbert says he was approached to direct the film by Mina Wallis with William Holden and Audrey Hepburn attached. It turned out Hepburn was not interested but Holden was. Gilbert liked the script and agreed to make it. Gilbert said that the original writer-producer Karl Tunberg felt Capucine, who was the mistress of the producer Charles K. Feldman and was cast as Holden's Eurasian mistress, was miscast; he also says Holden had already worked with Capucine on The Lion in 1962 and did not want to do it again so it seemed Capucine would be replaced. However Feldman then fired Tunberg and had the script rewritten by Ben Hecht building up Capucine's part. Gilbert disliked the new film and wanted to quit but says Feldman started to cry and begged him to stay. Gilbert worked on the script with Hecht.

At one stage the film was known as The Third Road, Ten Days to Penang and also The Year of the Dragon.

The script included a nude scene for Susannah York, who did not want to do it, but on location the filmmakers insisted. She appeared in one take and her stand-in appeared in another. Photos of York shooting the scene were later published in Playboy magazine. York explained, "Someone had a long distance camera. I'd just like to forget about it. It's an unfortunate business."

== Reception ==
Variety wrote "Despite script deficiencies and some static direction" the film "has sufficient action-adventure elements to make it a reasonable boxoffice contender, with William Holden's name as lure."

However the film generated $2.3 million in revenue and ranked 89th among American films for 1964. Gilbert says the film did not recoup its cost.

Lewis Gilbert subsequently used Tetsuro Tamba on You Only Live Twice.

Filmink argued the film "has historical interest".

== Soundtrack ==
The film's score was composed by Riz Ortolani following the popularity of his score for Mondo Cane that was released in the U.S. in 1963. The theme song "The Seventh Dawn" was sung by the Lettermen on the film soundtrack. Sergio Franchi recorded the song as a 1964 single and Roland Shaw provided an instrumental cover version.
