= Rome Daily American =

Italian English-language newspaper (1946–1984)

- Type: Daily newspaper
- Founded: 1946
- Ceased publication: 1984
- Language: English
- Headquarters: Rome, Italy

The Rome Daily American was an English-language daily newspaper published in Rome, Italy which operated from 1946 to 1984.

== History ==
The Daily American was started by three GIs taking advantage of the discontinuation of the publication in Europe of Stars and Stripes, the American military newspaper which had been published there during and just after World War II. It took over the Stars and Stripes Linotype printing press in an arrangement facilitated by the Central Intelligence Agency. Its model and competitor for sales was the International Herald Tribune published in Paris, but it took two days for copies to reach Rome.

According to Carl Bernstein, the Daily American was 40% owned by the CIA until the early 1970s. The intent of this ownership was to provide cover for CIA operatives and to influence the Italian electorate as a part of Operation Mockingbird. During this period, the newspaper office was bombed and damaged.

In the mid-1970s it was nominally owned by Chantal du Bois, the pen-name of Gabriella Lepore, housed in a central Rome (Via di Santa Maria in via 12) palazzo just off the Corso between the Parliament and the Trevi Fountain. The Daily American was produced and "put to bed" each early evening alongside the production of L'Umanità, the small daily house organ of the centre-left Italian Democratic Socialist Party (PSDI). A Daily American radio station was also on site, with bi-lingual deejays broadcasting wire-service news and contemporary pop music. The radio stations most popular years were between 1975 and 1977, with standout notables being, featured morning DJ Julie Sutter and night DJ "Wild Freddy Cannon." Cannon an EMI Record executive at the time in Rome, created a very successful competition between all the English speaking Roman schools, which was broadcast five nights a week.This popular show was followed by many Roman students, became the most highly rated show in the Rome area, with a strong demographic appeal for both English and Italian listeners with an average of 79,000 listeners a night. Due to his EMI connections, Cannon was able to interview many famous stars such as John Lennon, Paul McCartney and many more, giving the station mass appeal. "The Voice of the Daily American" radio station achieved its highest listenership under Cannon's broadcasting direction during 1975-1977. Cannon was also responsible for getting the exclusive radio coverage of the " Save Venice Concert" in 1976, featuring Paul McCartney and Wings, which he was responsible putting together for EMI and the 1976 US Bi Cenntenial celebration in Rome, which he hosted at St.Georges School with 8600 attendees, giving the station exclusive highlighted coverage of both events. Cannon, eventually went on to have an illustrious career in the music industry in Britain (EMI and Carrere Records ) and later in the United States (BMI and Creative and Dreams Music Network). One of the other successful shows, was the late night special with the newspapers music critic Roman Kozak, who later became a famous music critic for Billboard magazine in the US.

Unionized Italian typographers worked with an English-speaking, some bilingual, editorial staff of self-exiled Vietnam era expatriates, expat holdovers from World War II, and a cadre of American "interns" imported from top U.S. journalism schools—all under low wages of 250 thousand lire per month (US dollar then at approximately 1 to 650 lire). The paper's earlier CIA connections were by then overstated if at all even existent, as daily operations were overseen by the avuncular former Associated Press career journalist, the iconic Iowan turned Roman, Jim Long.

Under union strife in 1977, much of the Daily American staff bolted to the then newly founded International Daily News owned by Robbie Cunningham and Frank Crawford Cunningham its (founder having connections through his American father with the original Daily American), many of those same baby-boomer staffers eventually going on to careers in journalism with American publications and services such as United Press International (UPI), Associated Press (AP), Congressional Quarterly, USA Today, U.S. News & World Report, NPR, and other publications, some also moving into academia in Italian-related studies and publications.

Veteran Daily American critics such as John Francis Lane (film), featured with Gore Vidal in Federico Fellini's Roma, and Brendan Fitzgerald (dance) were icons of the Roman arts scene when many said the Eternal City was dead.

It went into receivership in 1984. At that time, it was publishing 15,000 papers. Competition from the tabloid International Daily News, in 1977, appeared to hasten its demise.

== Namesakes ==
The American Magazine, published in Rome in English takes its name from the Rome Daily American.

== Editors ==
- Michael Keon — 1953- < 1963
- G. Everett Hill, III
- David Mazzarella — 1971-1975
- Christoper P. Winner — 1981-1984
