= Vinny Marcos =

Filipino socialite and software engineer (born 1997)

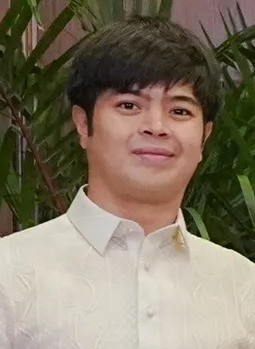
- Marcos in 2025
- Born: William Vincent Araneta Marcos; May 17, 1997 (age 29); San Juan, Metro Manila, Philippines
- Education: Oxford Brookes University; Worth School
- Occupations: Socialite; software engineer
- Known for: Youngest son of Bongbong Marcos and Liza Araneta Marcos
- Title: Chairperson of the Bagong Pilipinas Youth
- Term: August 16, 2025; 14 months ago
- Predecessor: post established
- Movement: Bagong Pilipinas
- Parents: Bongbong Marcos (father); Liza Araneta Marcos (mother)
- Relatives: Imelda Marcos (grandmother); Sandro Marcos (brother); Ferdinand Marcos (grandfather); Imee Marcos (aunt); Irene Marcos (aunt); Aimee Marcos (adopted aunt); Matthew Manotoc (cousin)
- Family: Marcos family Araneta family Romualdez family

William Vincent "Vinny" Araneta Marcos (born May 17, 1997) is a Filipino socialite and software engineer who is the youngest son of current president Bongbong Marcos and first lady Liza Araneta Marcos, and the grandson of former dictator Ferdinand Marcos and former first lady Imelda Marcos. He has served as the chairperson of Bagong Pilipinas Youth, a youth empowerment movement launched by his father's administration, since 2025.

== Early life and education ==
William Vincent Araneta Marcos was born on May 17, 1997 at Cardinal Santos Medical Center in San Juan, Metro Manila and spent his formative years in the home province of the Marcoses, Ilocos Norte. He is the third and youngest son of Bongbong Marcos and Liza Araneta Marcos and the youngest of three siblings. His older brothers are Sandro and Joseph Simon. Marcos went to Worth School in West Sussex, England, graduated from the Oxford Brookes University, and became a software engineer. According to Marcos, he grew up next to the beach and that he was never influenced by money.

== Career ==
Marcos worked as a software engineer in Singapore for two years before returning back to the Philippines to help with his father during the 2022 Philippine presidential election.

=== Internship for Martin Romualdez ===
On January 23, 2023, Marcos became an intern for the office of then house speaker Martin Romualdez. On January 26, 2023, Marcos attended the first meeting of the year of the minority bloc of the House of Representatives. A statement from the office of Romualdez stated that Marcos will undergo training in the legislative process and Romauldez was expected to supervise and oversee Marcos's training just like he did with Sandro Marcos for two years before becoming congressman. On February 17, 2023, Marcos attended the unveiling of the newly renovated municipal hall of General Luna, Siargao, along with Romualdez. Marcos was also proclaimed to be the adopted son of Baler, Aurora.

=== Bagong Pilipinas Youth ===
On August 16, 2025, Marcos became the chairman of the Bagong Pilipinas Youth.

== Personal life ==
In an interview with Boy Abunda, Marcos told Abunda that he wanted to be out of the spotlight when he found out that his father was running for president, but still advocated for his father's presidential run. Marcos's mother Liza recounted her son's "first love", a Russian, and that Liza did not like Marcos's girlfriend for her not being able to speak English clearly and not knowing how to say "please" and "thank you". Marcos also likes to skateboard and play the guitar.
