= Michael Keon =

Australian journalist and author

- Born: James Michael Keon; 19 October 1918; Melbourne, Victoria
- Died: 22 May 2006 (aged 87); Rosebud, Victoria
- Occupation: Novelist
- Spouse: Elizabeth Marcos (divorced)
- Children: Michael Marcos Keon

James Michael Keon (19 October 1918 – 22 May 2006) was an Australian political journalist and author. His articles and books mainly focus on Asian politics and the military actions that surround the changes and transitions in political power.

== Biography ==
Born in Melbourne, Victoria, He married Elizabeth Marcos, a member of the Philippine political family, and sister of Ferdinand Marcos. Their son is politician Michael Marcos Keon.

During World War II Keon worked for the Australian Department of Information. In November 1945 he and fellow journalist Geoffrey Sawer broadcast a series of three short-wave radio reports criticizing the policies of the United Kingdom, the United States, and the Dutch (who controlled much of the country) of their activities in Indonesia, and their hypocrisy (mainly the U.S.) in ignoring the plight of the country and the Indonesian people.

The broadcasts caused a backlash in that one arm of the government was criticizing another, and these transmissions were themselves criticized, prompting a ministerial investigation into broadcast policy, and the resignation of the short-wave division head, William Macmahon Ball.

In the late 1940s he worked as a correspondent for United Press International. He spent much of this time covering the Communists in China and elsewhere is Southeast Asia. In January 1948 while covering the Chinese Civil War he was walking in a field outside the west side of Peiping with fellow journalist and farmer Erich Wilberg (from Bremen), when gun fire was directed towards them. Keon hit the ground and was not injured but Wilberg was killed.

On 1 and 2 February 1949, Keon and Spencer Moosa (the correspondent for the Associated Press) reported on the Communist taking the city of Peiping. Soon after the Communist news agency started broadcasting that the people demand that the two journalist be expelled because they had 'libeled the people'. By the end of February all foreign correspondents, news-agencies, foreign newspapers, etc., were ordered to discontinue activities.

His first novel, The Tiger in Summer (published in 1953), was about the Chinese Communists during the transition period.

Keon was the English press relations officer for the Indonesian government in 1950. While working in this position he met Elizabeth E. Marcos while in Singapore, also in 1950. They were married in Singapore on 21 February 1951. The couple then lived in the Philippines for 18 months. He became the editor of the Rome Daily American, which was the largest English newspaper in the post-war era in Italy, in 1953.

Keon worked for the United Nations Food and Agricultural Organization and had a hand in setting up the International Rice Research Institute in Los Baños, Laguna. He was stationed in Washington D.C. and at the United Nations headquarters in New York City in 1963.

During his time in Rome, and after the couple split, his wife, Elizabeth, was press attache for the Philippine Embassy starting in 1961, and their son Michael Edward was born in Rome on 22 September 1954. Michael and Elizabeth separated permanently in April 1962.

In 1963, at the age of eight, Michael Edward made worldwide headlines in the international custody battle between his parents. An Australian court awarded custody of Michael Edward to his father because the child had been registered as an Australian citizen and had been raised in "Western ways". After the divorce Michael Edward was partially raised by his paternal aunt and her husband.

Keon's novel, The Durian Tree, about the struggle between the British colonialist and Communist insurgents after World War II in Malaysia, was the basis for the 1964 film The 7th Dawn.

Keon's former wife, Elizabeth Marcos, was vice-governor and later governor of the Philippine province of Ilocos Norte (1971–83). She married, secondly, in Ilocos Norte in September 1979, to businessman Ludwig Petre Rocka. Rocka was born in Tulcea, Romania, and became an Australian citizen. He was a former engineer who became a prominent Melbourne and Manila businessman (International Development & Planning Corporation) in the construction business and also sold heavy construction equipment.

== Death ==
Elizabeth Marcos died at age 65 of heart failure, in a Manila hospital, 14 December 1986. Michael Keon died in Rosebud, Victoria at the age of 87.

== Works ==
- Fiction (fact/historical based):
  - 1953: The Tiger in Summer – (New York: Harper & Brothers)
  - 1960: The Durian Tree – (New York: Simon & Schuster; OCLC Number: 1448119)
- Non-fiction:
  - 1977: Korean Phoenix: A Nation From the Ashes – (Englewood Cliffs, N.J.: Prentice-Hall International)
  - 1993: Joy Hester: An Unsettling World – (North Caulfield, Victoria: Malakoff Fine Art Press)
  - 1996: Glad Morning Again – (Watsons Bay, NSW: Imprint; autobiography)
