= Northwestern University (Philippines) =

Private university in Ilocos Norte, Philippines

- Type: Private university
- Established: 1932
- President: Ferdinand Nicolas
- Location: Laoag, Ilocos Norte, Philippines; 18°11′8″N 120°34′1″E
- Campus: 9 hectares (22 acres)
- Website: www.nwu.edu.ph
- Location in Luzon Location in the Philippines

Northwestern University (NWU) is a private higher educational institution in Laoag, Philippines. It was formally known as Northwestern Academy before becoming Northwestern College and eventually renaming itself to Northwestern University. The school is not affiliated with Northwestern University in Evanston, Illinois. It is the largest private University in Northern Luzon.

== History ==
In 1932, it was as the Northwest Academy and was converted into a University in 1992.

== Academics ==
Northwestern University has eleven academic departments. Each college has specific target plans which guide them in designing programs which are vertically articulated from the undergraduate to graduate studies. The university offers doctorate, master's, diploma and certificate courses.

=== Publications ===
- The Review is the official college student publication of Northwestern University which is published as a broadsheet and includes an annual literary supplement titled Flame.
- The Gazette is the bi-annual news magazine of the university reporting on news and events. The Gazette is also supplemented by a newsletter which comes out once a month.
- Balintataw is the high school student publication of Northwestern University and is published as a broadsheet.
- The NWU Research Journal is an annual interdisciplinary journal featuring research works of the faculty, personnel, and graduate school students of the University.
