= Aimee Marcos =

Philippine drummer and public figure (born 1979)

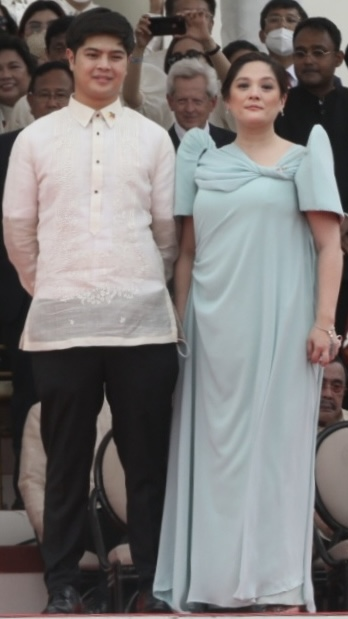
- Marcos (right) with her nephew Vinny at her brother Bongbong's presidential inauguration
- Born: Aimee Romualdez Marcos; May 2, 1979 (age 47); United States
- Spouse: Cid Bernedo
- Children: 1
- Parent: Teresita Romualdez (biological mother)
- Musical career
- Instrument: Drums
- Member of: The Dorques

Aimee Romualdez Marcos-Bernedo (born May 2, 1979) is a Filipino musician and public figure known as the drummer of indie music band the Dorques. She is the adopted daughter of the late former Philippine President Ferdinand Marcos and former first lady Imelda Marcos.

She was the only member of the immediate Marcos family to still be a minor when martial law was formally lifted in 1981 and when the Marcoses went into exile in Honolulu in 1986, and she has stayed away from politics.

She is currently living in Cagayan de Oro with her husband, Cid Bernedo, and their son.

== Early life ==
Aimee Romualdez Marcos was born on May 2, 1979 to Teresita Romualdez, and was soon adopted into the family of Philippine president Ferdinand Marcos and his wife Imelda, Romualdez's aunt. After the People Power Revolution ousted the Marcoses from power in 1986, Aimee joined the family in going into exile in Honolulu.

== In popular culture ==
Marcos was portrayed by Lana Puda in the 2022 period drama film Maid in Malacañang.

She was the drummer of The Dorques, a Manila-based multilingual indie band and also was a DJ in some smaller venues across the metro. She was also drummer for the Marshas, Geezer, and Princess Bato in high school.

== See also ==
- Marcos family
- Original Pilipino music
