= Vigan =

Capital city of Ilocos Sur, Philippines

- Component city
- City of Vigan
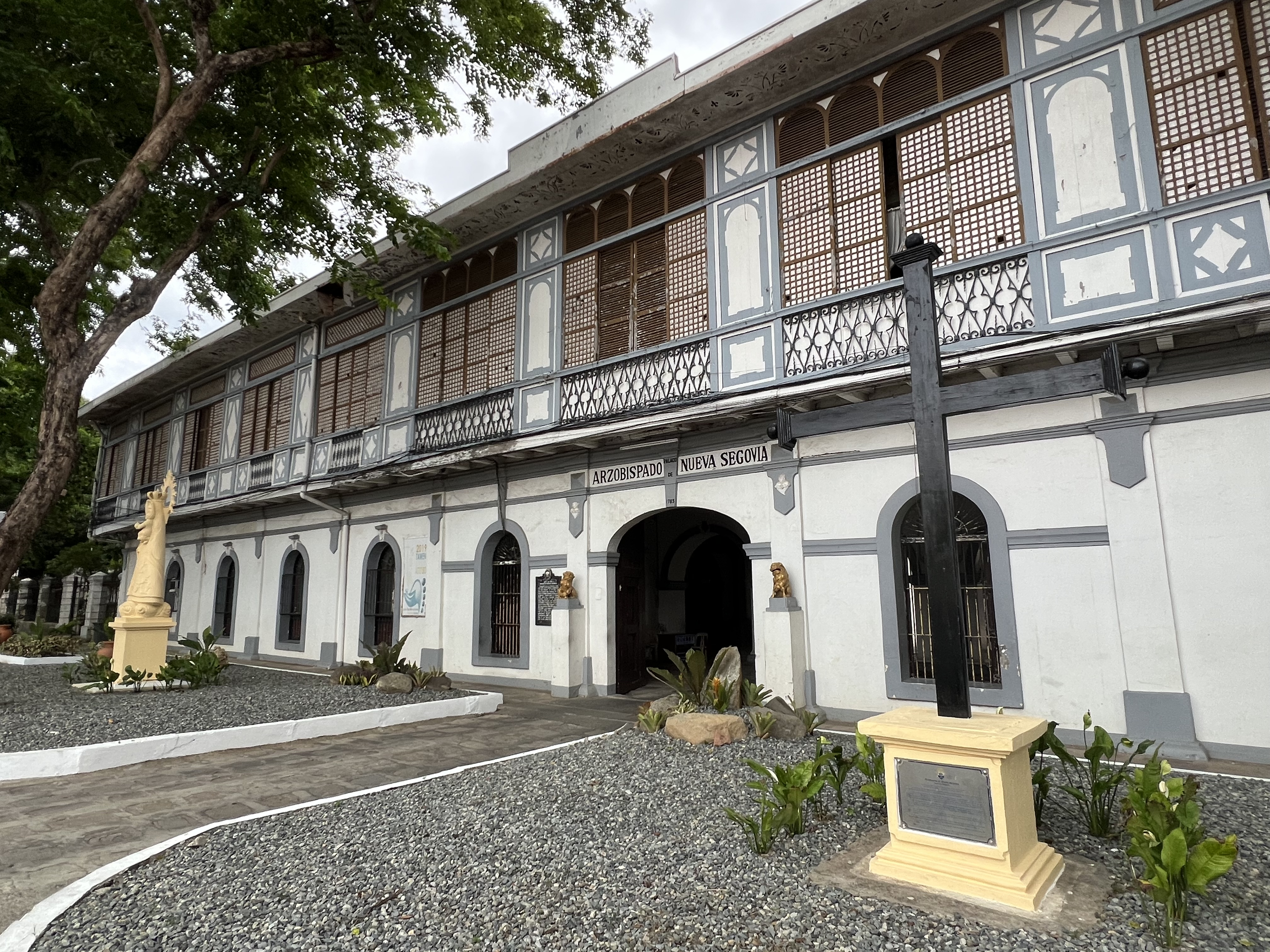
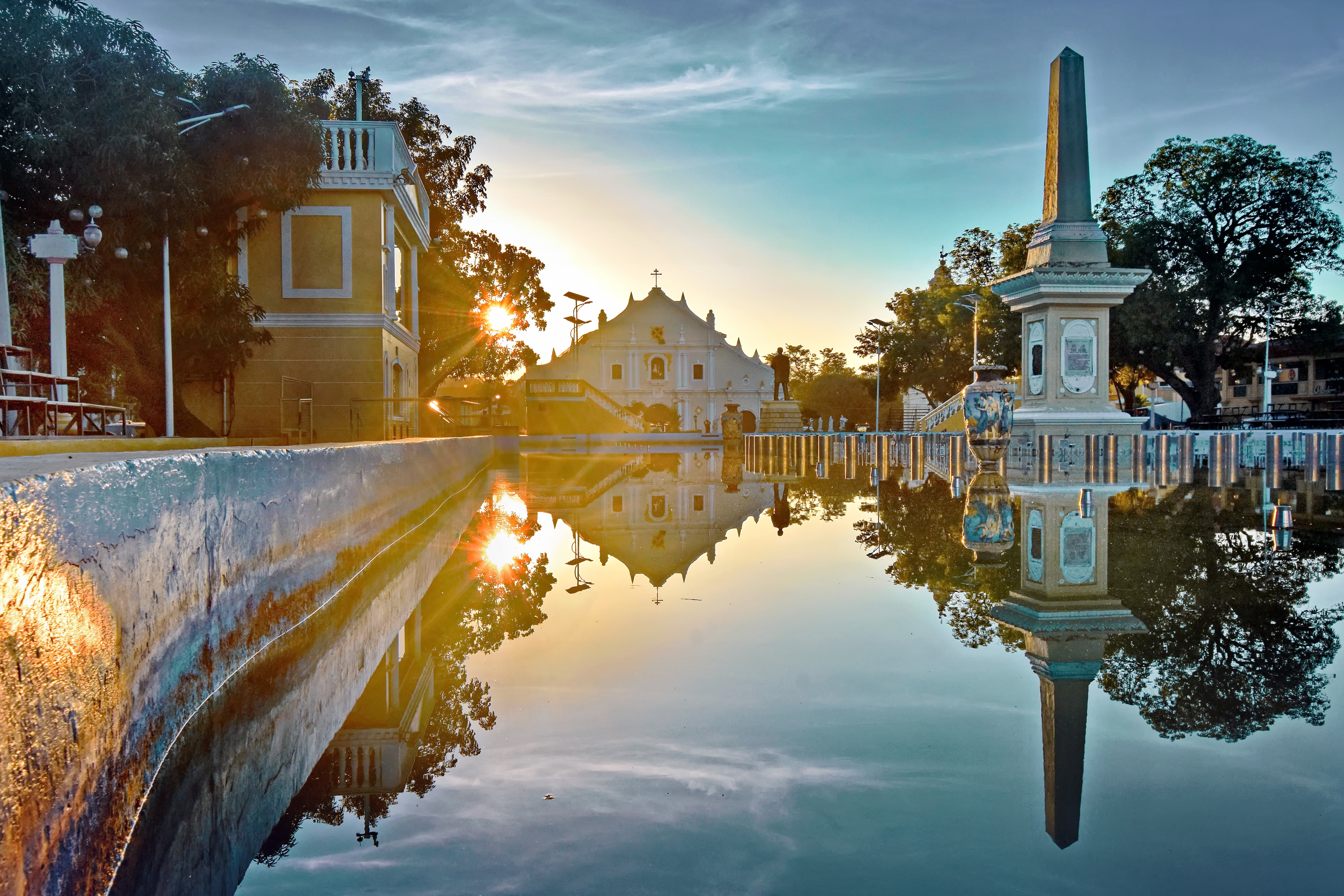
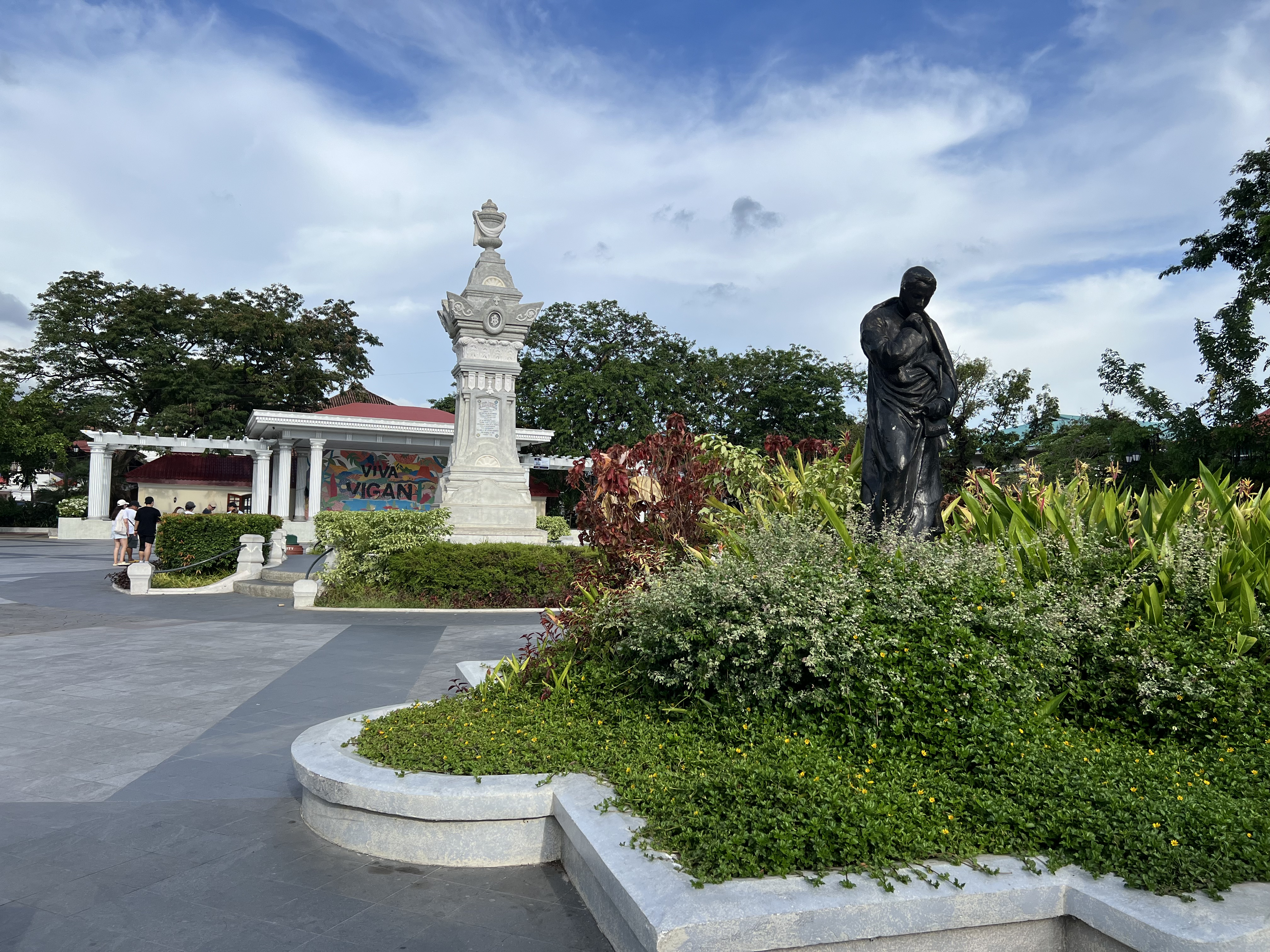
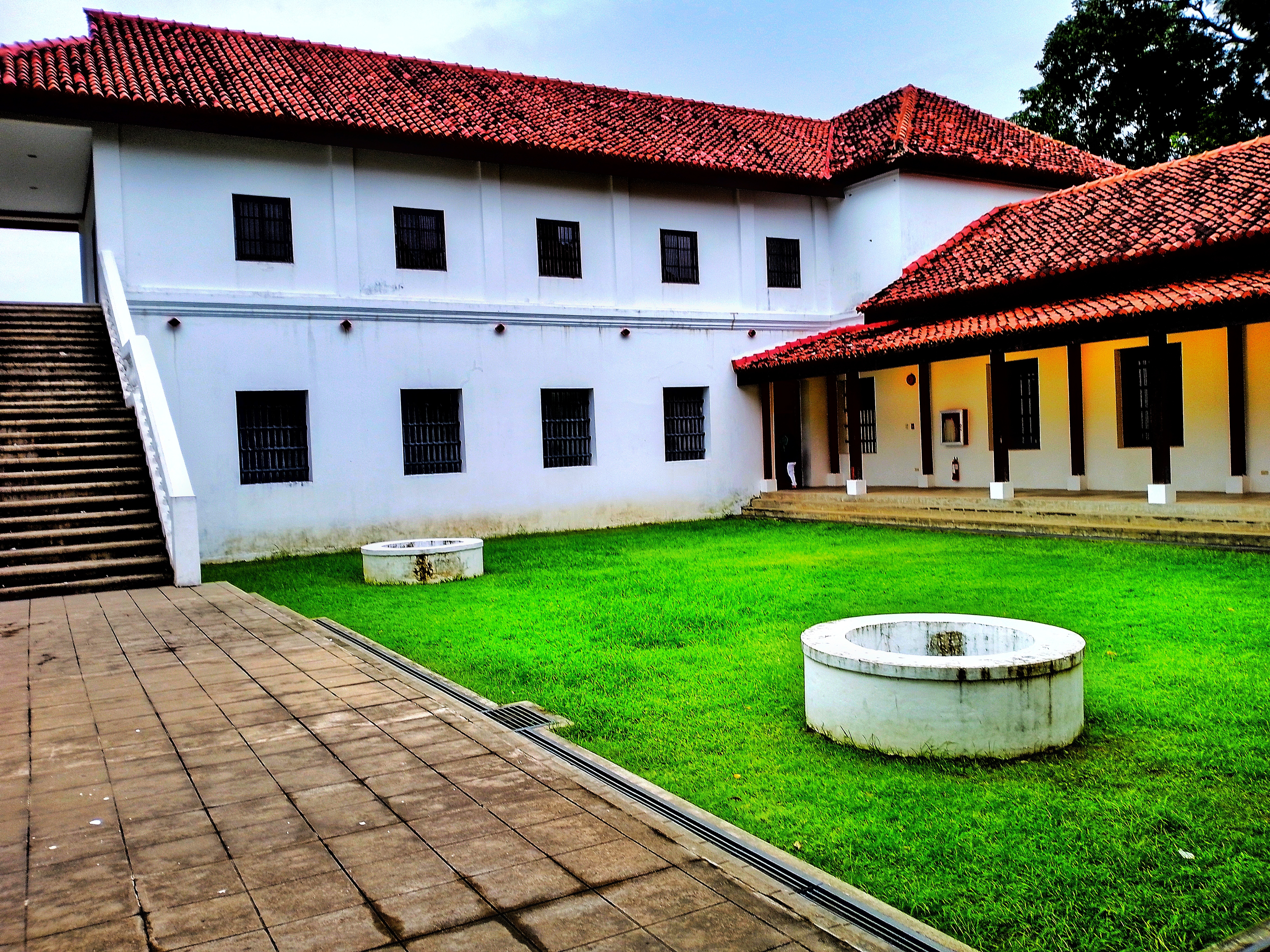
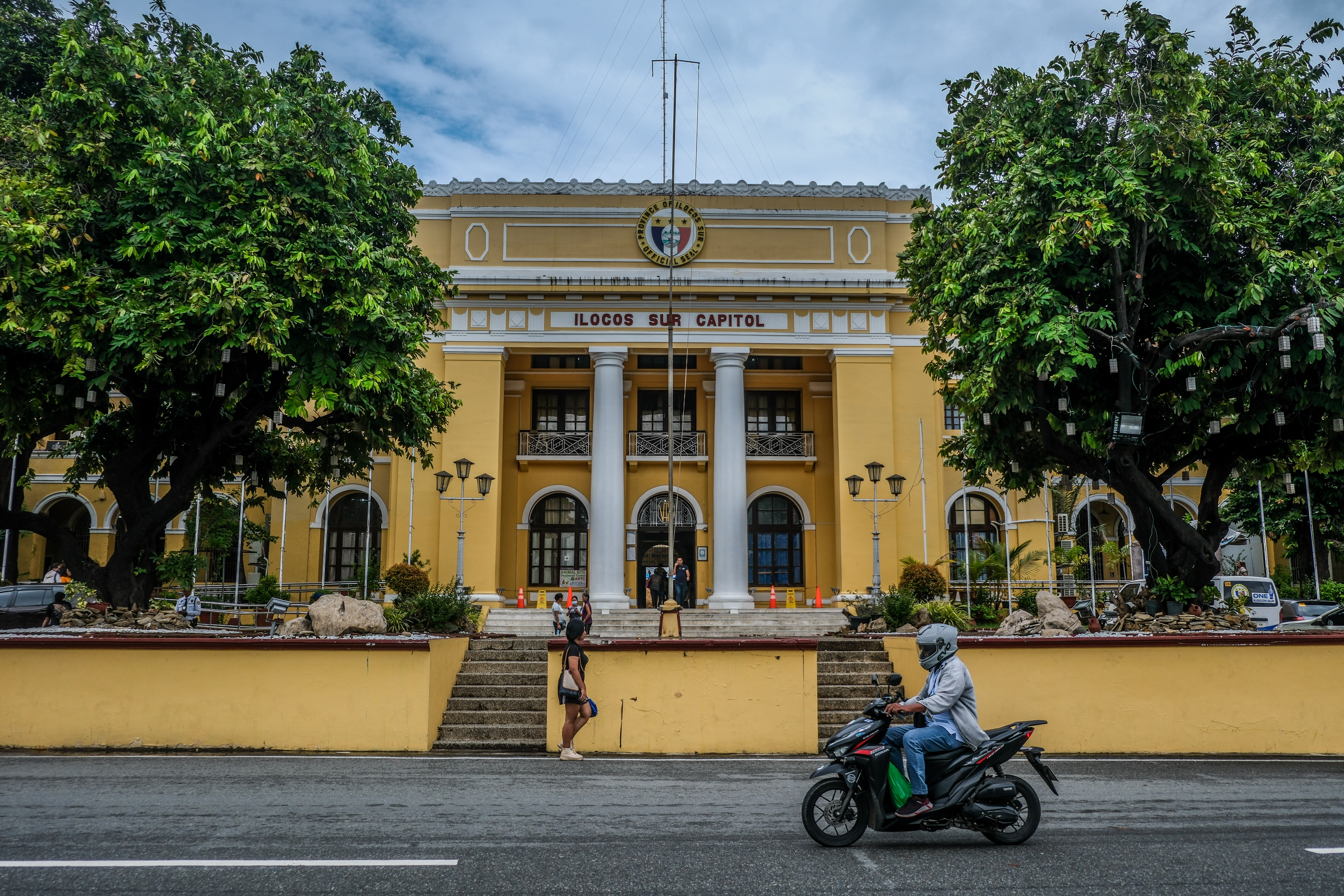
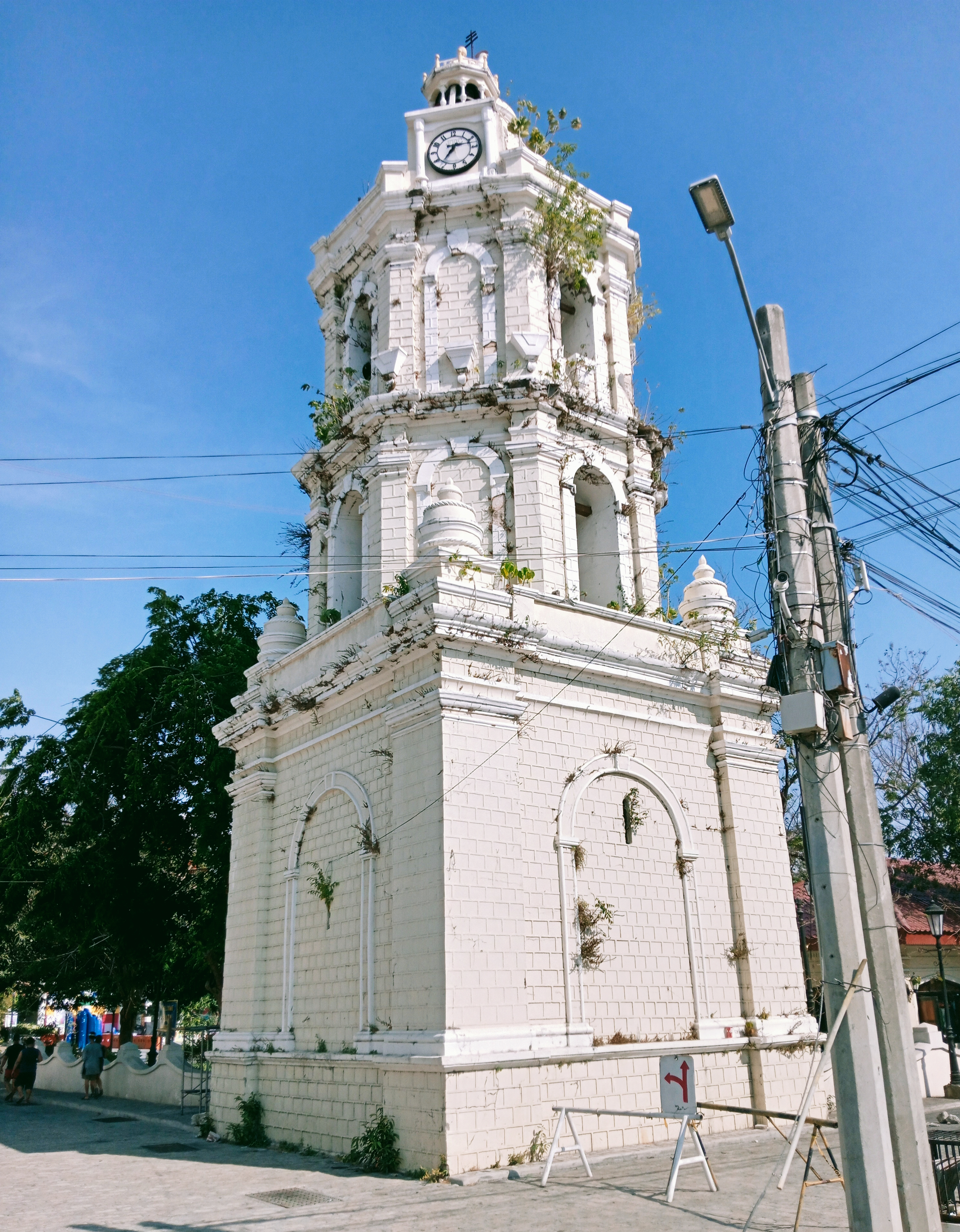
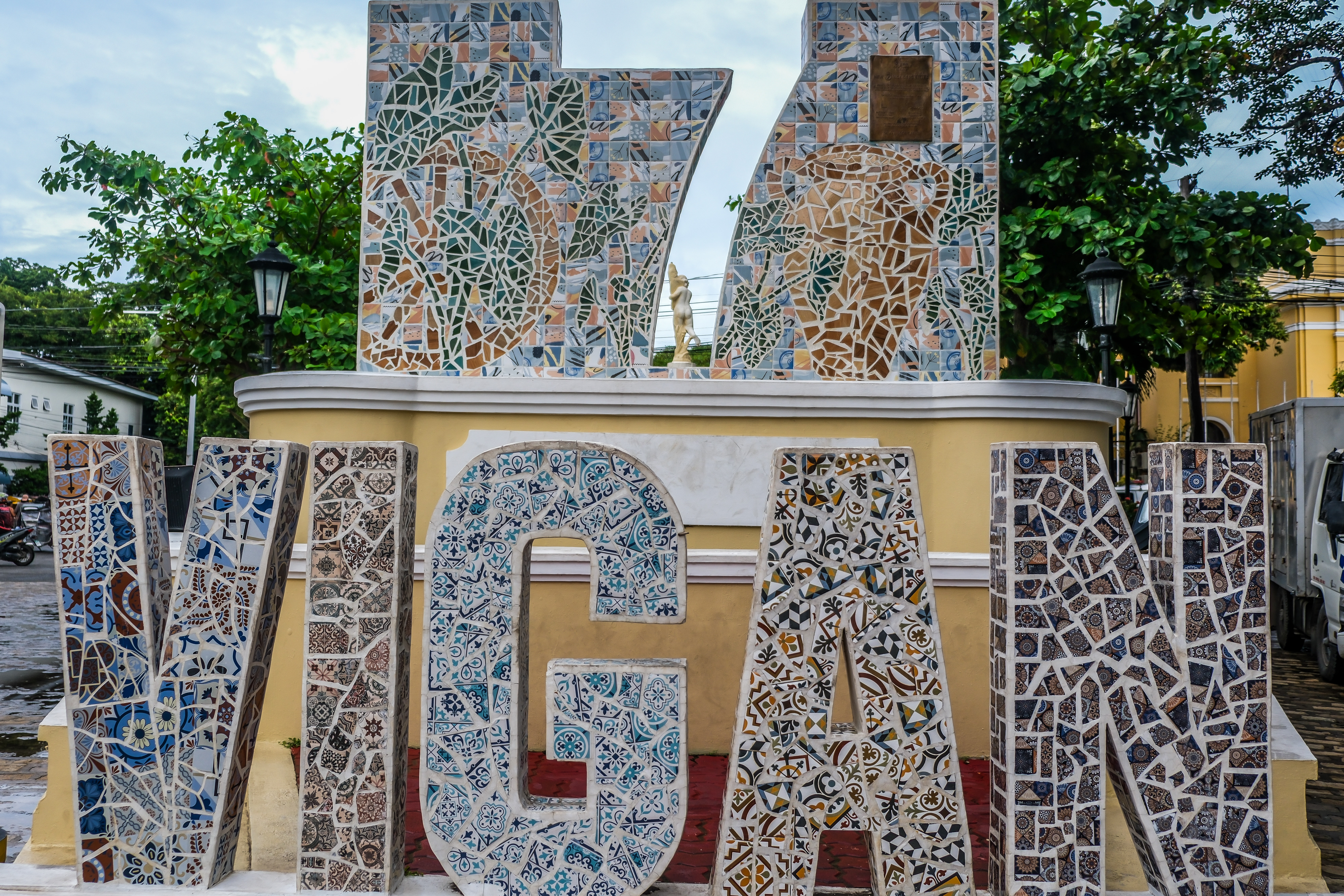
- Left to right, from the top: Calle Crisólogo, Palacio de Arzobispado Nueva Segovia, Plaza Salcedo with Vigan Cathedral, Plaza Burgos, National Museum Ilocos, Ilocos Sur Provincial Capitol, Vigan Cathedral Bell Tower, Vigan City's Seven Wonder Monument

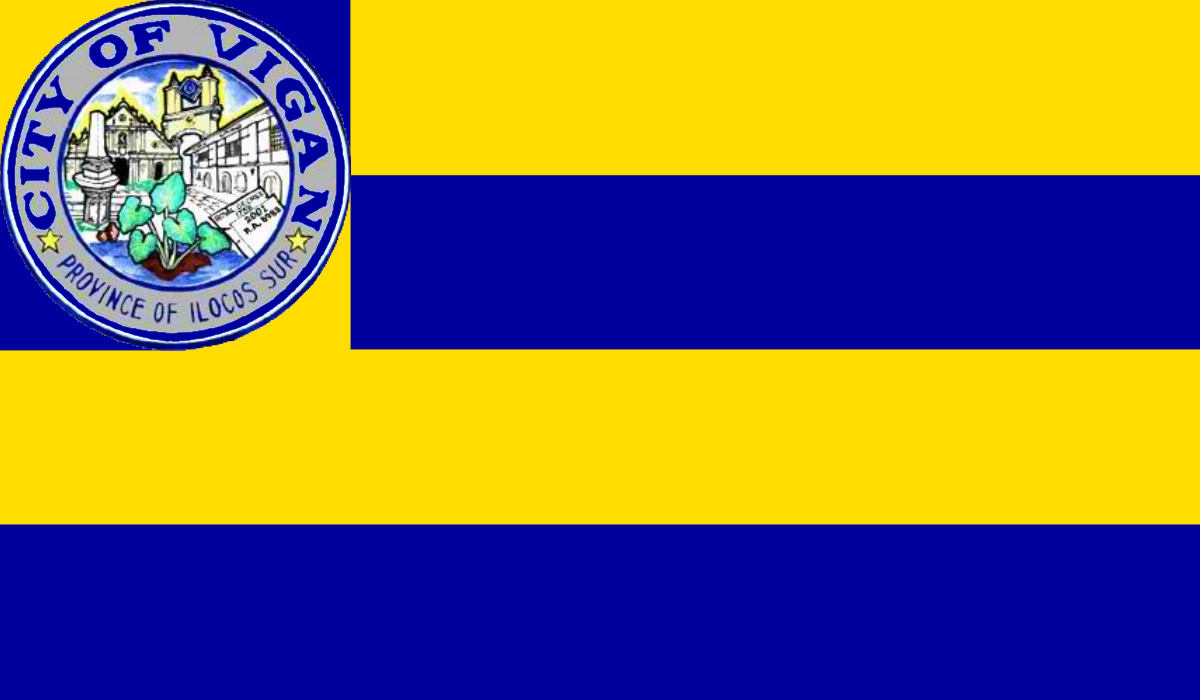
- Flag Seal
- Nicknames: Premier World Heritage City in the Philippines; World's Living Museum City in the Philippines
- Motto: Viva Vigan!
- Anthem: Vigan City Hymn
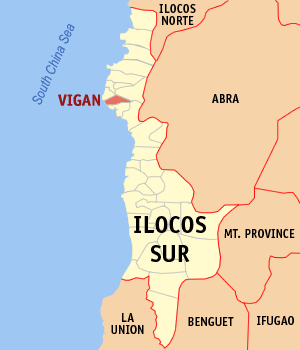
- Map of Ilocos Sur with Vigan highlighted
- Interactive map of Vigan
- Location within the Philippines
- Coordinates: 17°34′29″N 120°23′13″E
- Country: Philippines
- Region: Ilocos Region
- Province: Ilocos Sur
- District: 1st district
- Founded: 1572
- Cityhood: January 22, 2001
- Barangays: 39 (see Barangays)

Government
  - Type: Sangguniang Panlungsod
  - Mayor: Randolf V. Singson
  - Vice Mayor: Atty. Glendale Benzon
  - Representative: Ronald V. Singson
  - City Council: Members: Kisses Agdamag-Lim; Joy Bennette Orio; Bobit Singson; Larry Raboy; Jay Andia; Karen Baquiran; Nestor Pajaro; Ramil Arce; Ada Joana Fe Artajos; Edmund Ayco; Shawn Patrick Singson; Carl Louie Alquetra
  - Electorate: 35,171 voters (2025)

Area
  - Total: 25.12 km^{2} (9.70 sq mi)
- Elevation: 69 m (226 ft)
- Highest elevation: 1,104 m (3,622 ft)
- Lowest elevation: 0 m (0 ft)

Population (2024 census)
  - Total: 54,498
  - Density: 2,170/km^{2} (5,619/sq mi)
  - Households: 12,702

Economy
  - Income class: 4th city income class
  - Poverty incidence: 3.93% (2023)
  - Revenue: ₱ 861.2 million (2024)
  - Assets: ₱ 2,874 million (2024)
  - Expenditure: ₱ 579.4 million (2024)
  - Liabilities: ₱ 68.68 million (2024)

Service provider
  - Electricity: Ilocos Sur Electric Cooperative (ISECO)
  - Water: Metro Vigan Water District (MVWD)
- Time zone: UTC+8 (PST)
- ZIP code: 2700
- PSGC: 0102934000
- IDD : area code: +63 (0)77
- Native languages: Ilocano; Tagalog
- Website: www.vigancity.gov.ph

UNESCO World Heritage Site
- Official name: Historic City of Vigan
- Criteria: Cultural: (ii), (iv)
- Reference: 502rev
- Inscription: 1999 (23rd Session)

Vigan, officially the City of Vigan (Ilocano: Siudad ti Vigan; Filipino: Lungsod ng Vigan; Spanish: Ciudad de Vigan), is a component city and capital of the province of Ilocos Sur, Philippines. According to the 2024 census, it has a population of 54,498 people.

Located on the western coast of the large island of Luzon, facing the South China Sea, it is a UNESCO World Heritage Site and it is one of the few Spanish colonial towns left in the Philippines whose old structures have mostly remained intact. It is well known for its sett pavements and a unique architecture of the Spanish colonial era which fuses native Philippine and Oriental building designs and construction, with colonial Spanish architecture that is still abundant in the area, mainly the bahay na bato houses and an Earthquake Baroque church.

It is known as the birthplace of Elpidio Quirino, the 6th President of the Philippines. He was born at the former location of the Provincial Jail (his father was a warden). He also resided in the Syquia Mansion, which was a wedding gift from his in-laws to his wife.

The entire city of Vigan was later inscribed as a UNESCO World Heritage City after being declared as a UNESCO World Heritage Site. It is a member of the Organization of World Heritage Cities (OWHC).

In May 2015, Vigan was officially recognized as one of the New7Wonders Cities together with Beirut, Doha, Durban, Havana, Kuala Lumpur, and La Paz.

== Etymology ==
The origin of the name "Vigan" is pre-colonial. It was also spelled "Bigan" in Spanish colonial records (including in the 1734 Velarde map). It is derived from Ilocano bigàan (or kabigàan), literally "the place where bíga abounds". Bíga is the common name of the giant taro (Alocasia macrorrhizos) in Ilocano.

Coat of arms of the Archdiocese of Nueva Segovia depicting a flowering bíga (Alocasia macrorrhizos)

This is reflected in the Spanish-era coat of arms of the Archdiocese of Nueva Segovia (of which Vigan was the seat of the episcopal see) which depicts a flowering Alocasia macrorrhizos proper.

The meaning of "Vigan" is also a common subject of folk etymologies, of which there are two popular accounts. One claiming it originated from a misunderstood question (a common trope in Filipino place-name folk etymologies); and another which claims it came from Chinese bí-gān (美岸), meaning "beautiful shore" (allegedly from the gold dust in the seashore). Neither of these accounts have historical or academic evidence.

=== Other names ===
The trading town of Vigan was near the settlement founded by Salcedo, which he named Villa Fernandina ("Town of Ferdinand"), in honor of Prince Ferdinand, the firstborn son of King Philip II of Spain. Villa Fernandina was originally meant to be the capital of Salcedo's encomienda, but it suffered from outbreaks of disease early in its history. It was later merged with the bigger trading town of Vigan, and was administered by a single alcalde mayor. Eventually, the name of Villa Fernandina became attached to Vigan. As the city grew, and the seat of the Archdiocese of Nueva Segovia transferred to Vigan, it was later renamed Ciudad Fernandina de Vigan ("Ferdinand's City of Vigan/Fernandine City of Vigan").

== History ==
=== Pre-Colonial Era ===
During the pre-colonial period, Vigan was a coastal trading post frequented by trade ships of Austronesian, Arab, Indian, Chinese, and (mainly) Japanese traders (similar to other trading towns along the Ilocos region like Aparri, Candon, and Lingayen). Traders sailing from the South China Sea came to Isla de Vigan (Island of Vigan) via the Mestizo River that surrounded it.

Due to silting of the Mestizo River, Vigan is no longer separated from the mainland, therefore no longer an island.

=== Spanish Colonial Era ===
In the book The Philippine Island (Vol. III, p. 276, Blair and Robertson) two letters from Governor-General Guido de Lavezaris to King Philip II of Spain mention: "It seemed best to send Captain Juan de Salcedo with 70 or 80 soldiers to explore the coast of Los Ilocanos on the shores of the river called Bigan." The Spaniards led by Salcedo marched north from Manila on May 20, 1572. They arrived in Vigan on June 13, 1572.

==== Villa Fernandina de Vigan ====
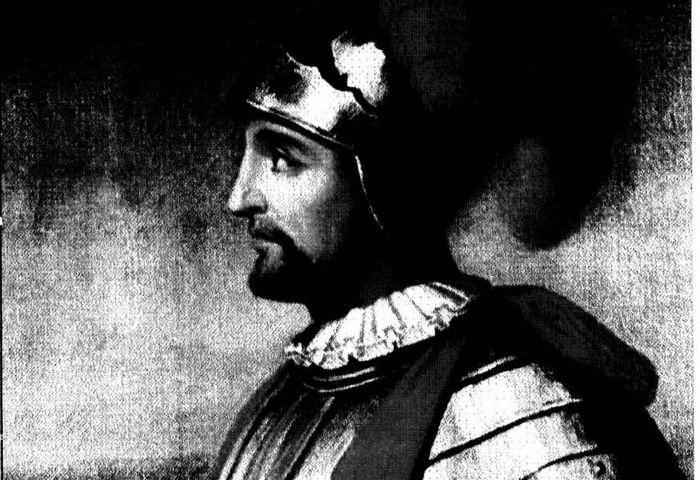
Juan de Salcedo, the Spanish conquistador who founded Villa Fernandina de Vigan in 1572.

Thus, after the successful expedition and the exploration of the North, Juan de Salcedo founded "Villa Fernandina de Vigan" in honor of King Philip II's son, Prince Ferdinand, who died at the age of four. From Vigan, Salcedo rounded the tip of Luzón and proceeded to pacify Camarines, Albay, and Catanduanes. As a reward for his services to the King of Spain, Salcedo was awarded the old province of Ilocos, which consisted of the modern provinces of Ilocos Norte, Ilocos Sur, Abra, La Union and part of Mountain Province as his hacienda (estate), and was accorded the title of Justicia Mayor de esta Provincia de Ylocos (Province Mayor of Ilocos).

In 1574, Salcedo returned to the capital of his encomienda (trusteeship), Vigan, bringing with him his soldiers and some Augustinian missionaries to pioneer the evangelization of the Ilocos region. He established a Spanish city for the purpose of controlling the neighboring country.

Governor General Gómez Pérez Dasmariñas, in his account of encomienda dated in Manila on May 31, 1591, states: "The town of Vigan called Villa Fernandina consisted of Spanish settlers; a priest; a Justice Alcalde Mayor (Governor); and a Deputy. The King collects 800 tributes (equivalent to 3,200 subjects)." During this period, Vigan was composed of 19 barrios (districts).

Between 1645 and 1660, Vigan was divided into 21 Cabezas de Barrio (Town Mayors) as mentioned in the Libro de Casamiento (Book of Marriage); from the records of the parish house of Vigan found in its archives. Separated from the indigenous population, the Chinese migrants were residents in a neighbourhood called El Pariancillo, los Sangleyes del parian (The Sangleyes of the Parian); and the Spanish settlers were residents in a town called Los Españoles de la Villa (The Town Spaniards). The Spaniards consisted of about 60 Spanish Households. The region of Ilocos where Vigan is located is also recorded to have had 631 Spanish-Filipino families. It also had 44,852 native families. Specifically, the city of Vigan alone, excluding the other towns of Ilocos had the lion's share of Ilocos' Spanish-Filipino population as the 1818 Spanish census showed Vigan alone had 6,849 native families co-progressing with 421 Spanish-Filipino families.

==== Ciudad Fernandina de Vigan ====
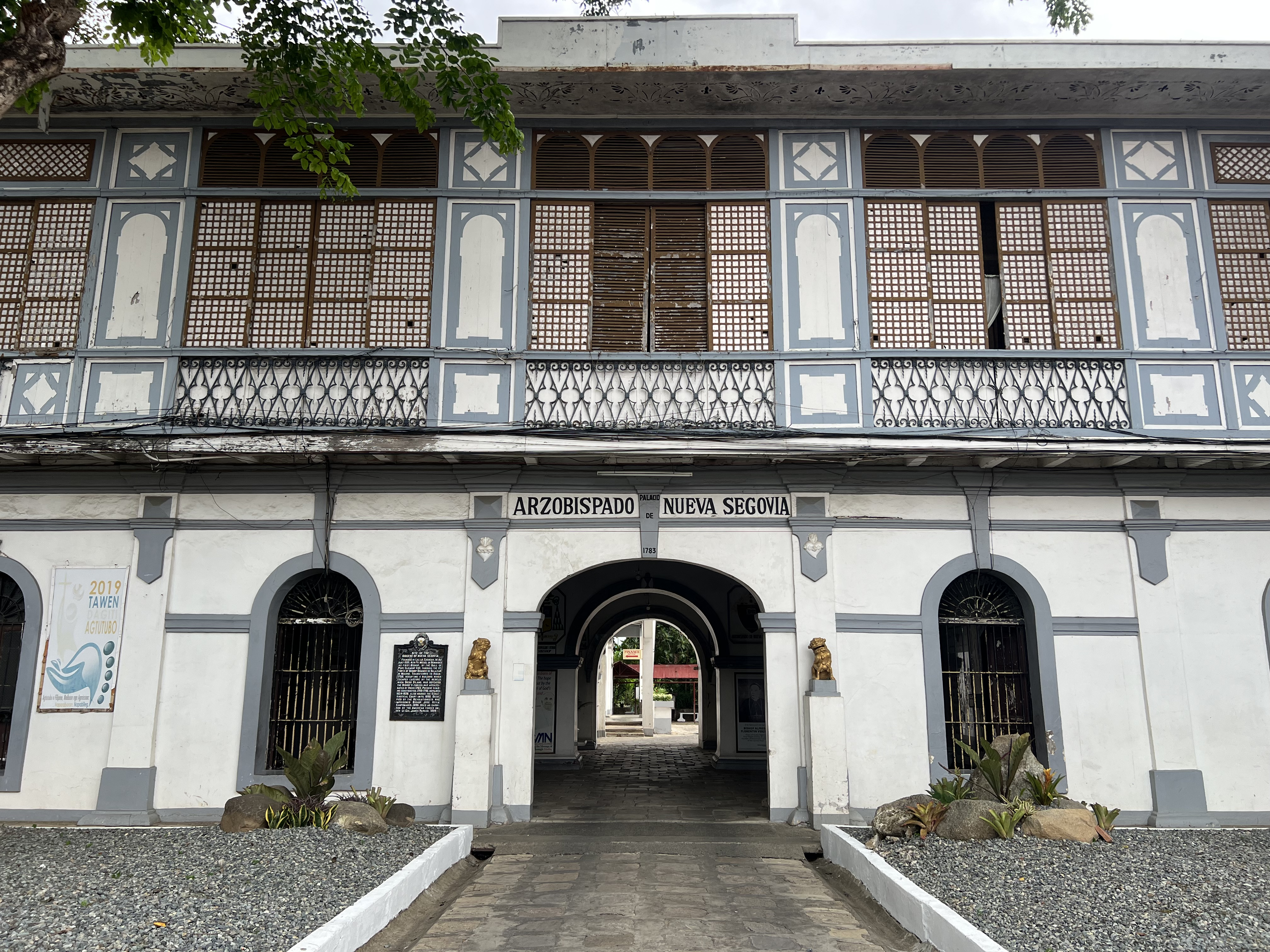
The Nueva Segovia Archbishop's Palace, the oldest existing one of its kind in the Philippines

In 1755, Bp. Juan de la Fuente Yepes made a request to the King Fernando VI to move the Diocese of Nueva Segovia to Villa Fernandina due to the deteriorating status of Lal-lo in Cagayan. In 1758, with the Royal Decree signed by Fernando VI, Villa Fernadina became Ciudad Fernandina de Vigan and the See of Nueva Segovia was transferred from Lal-lo. The bell ensconced within the belfry of Vigan, has the imprinted words of the decree. Wherever the clang of the bell reaches, it marks the territory of Ciudad Fernandina de Vigan. In 1849, Leona Florentino, the mother of Philippine women's literature, was born in Vigan.

=== Philippine Revolution and American Occupation ===
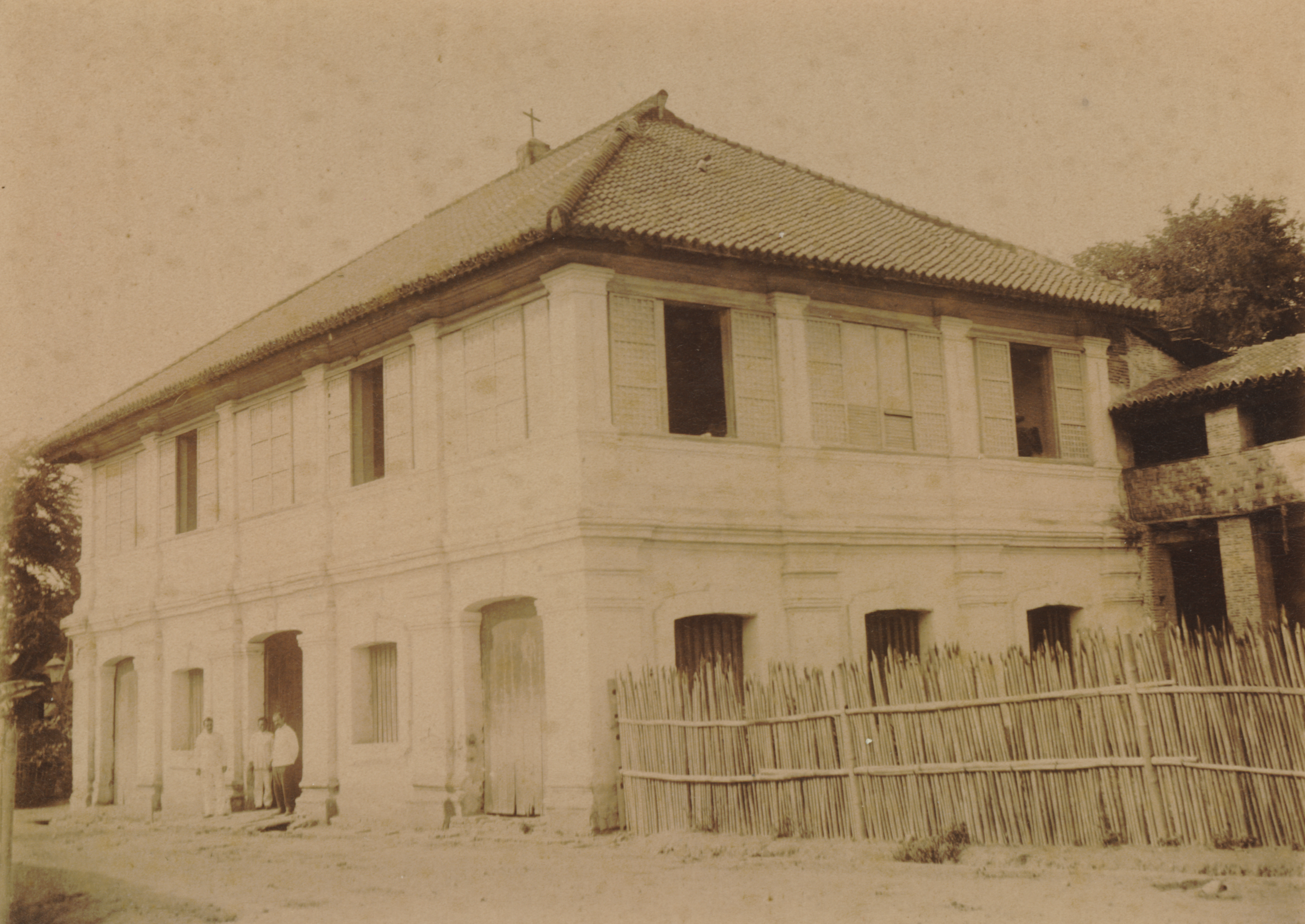
European-style house in Vigan, circa the 1930s.

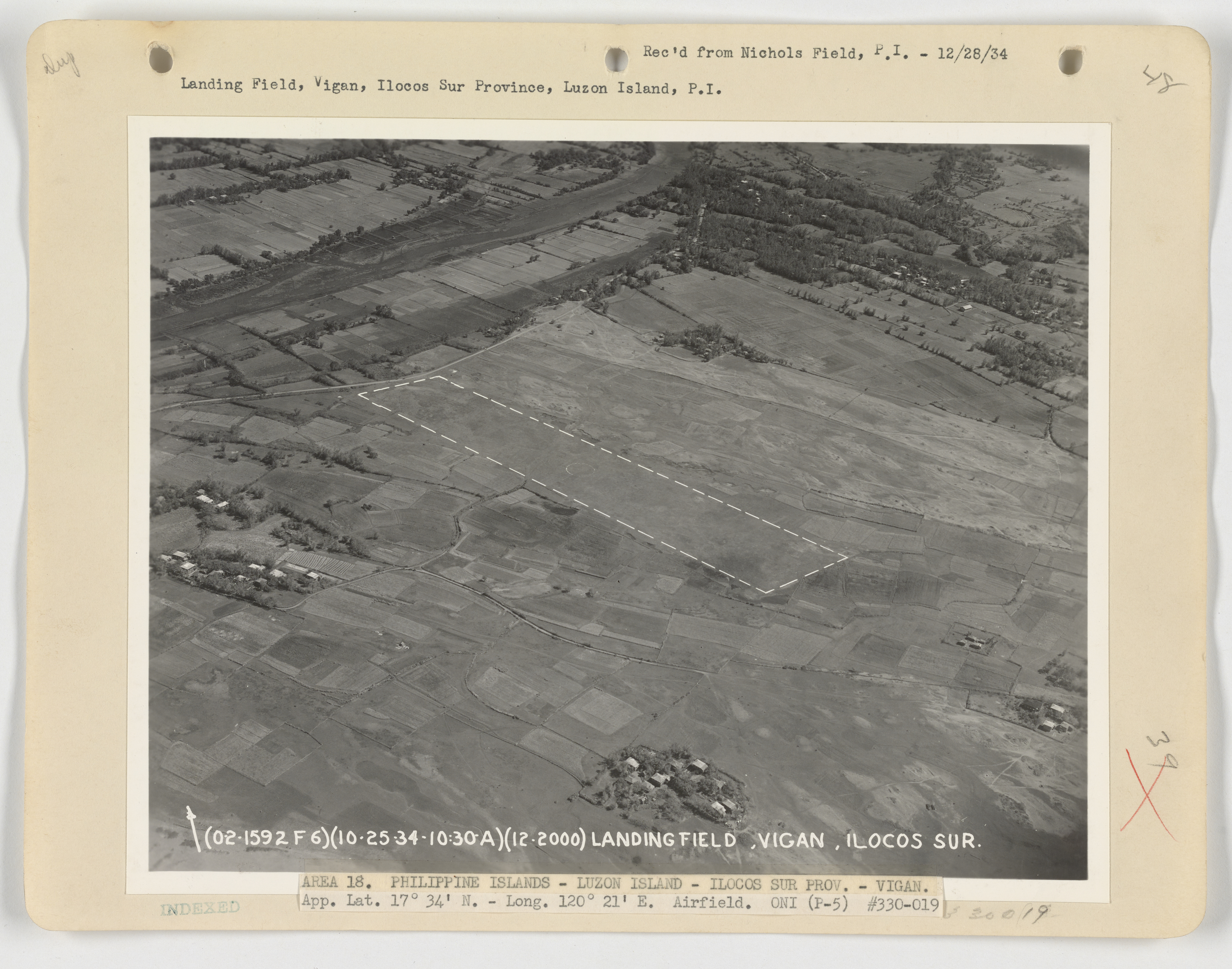
Map of Vigan and the Vigan Landing Field, 1935

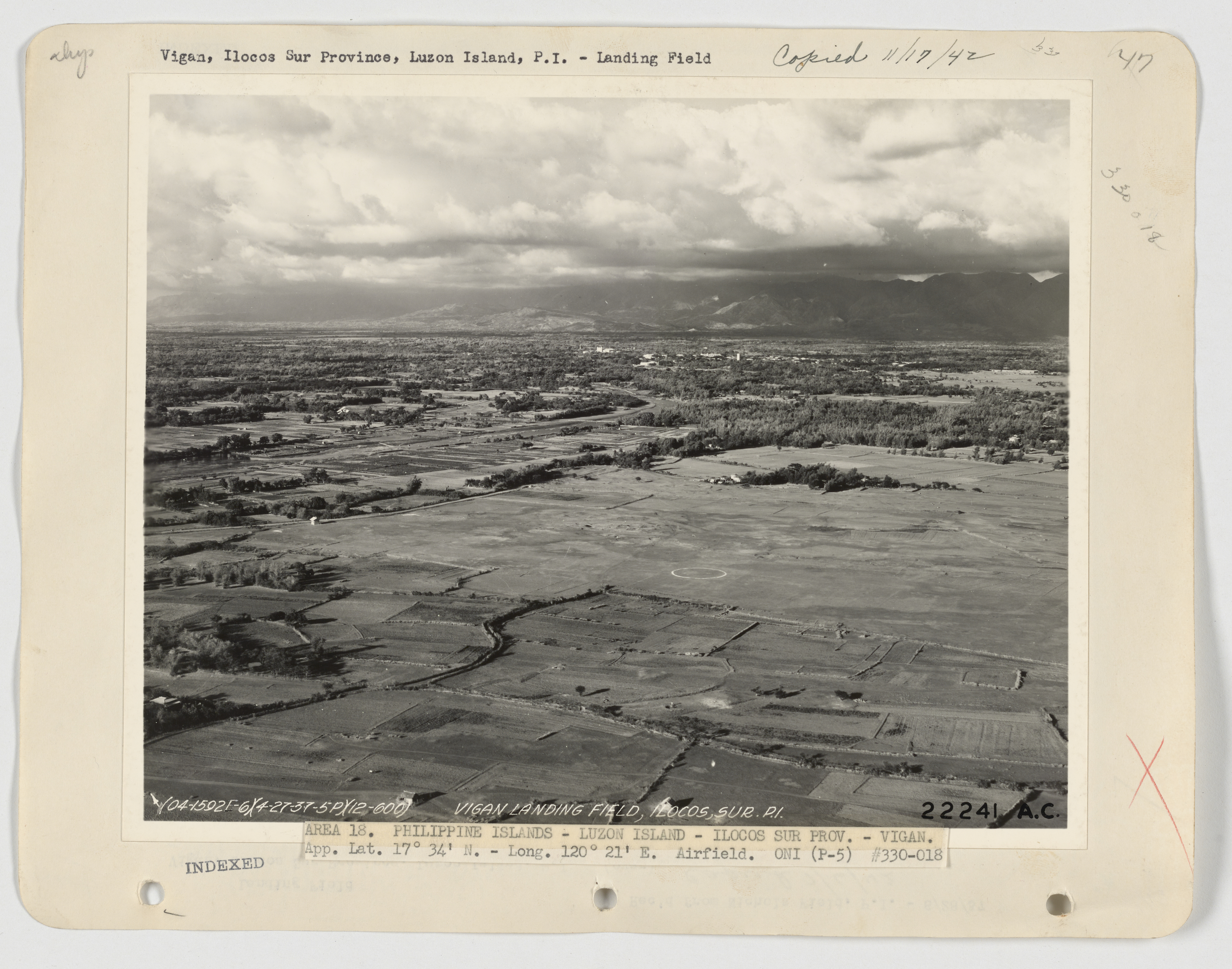
Aerial view of Vigan, circa 1940s

During the Philippine Revolution, revolutionary forces under Manuel Tinio, supported by the Ilocano rebels, attacked and defeated the Spanish colonial forces and captured the city in the Siege of Vigan. During the Philippine–American War, American forces led by Commander McCracken and Lt. Col. James Parker occupied the town in November 1899.

=== World War II ===
At the onset of World War II, Vigan was among the first locations in the Philippines invaded by the Imperial Japanese Army on December 10, 1941. The invasion force landed at Mindoro Beach in Vigan to secure airstrips and communications in Northern Luzon. During the occupation, the historic town served as a military garrison for Japanese forces.

Unlike Manila, Baguio, and Cebu, Vigan was spared from destruction during the liberation of the Philippines in 1945. Local historical accounts attribute this to negotiations between Belgian missionary Father Joseph Billiet and Japanese commander Captain Fujiro Takahashi, who agreed to spare the town from a scorched-earth strategy prior to the Japanese retreat.

The Japanese forces withdrew without burning the town, allowing combined U.S. and Philippine Commonwealth forces, alongside Ilocano guerrilla fighters, to liberate Vigan intact. The preservation of its Spanish colonial architecture became the primary basis for its inscription as a UNESCO World Heritage Site in 1999.

UNESCO World Heritage marker

=== UNESCO World Heritage City ===
In 1999, Vigan was listed by UNESCO as the best preserved example of Spanish colonial towns in Asia. Its architecture is the conglomeration of cultural elements from the Philippines, China, and Spain, making it unique in the world.

=== Recent history ===
==== Cityhood ====
On December 27, 2000, then-President Joseph Estrada signed Republic Act No. 8988, which "revalidated and recognized" Vigan's city status originally granted by virtue of the Royal Decree of September 7, 1757, issued by King Ferdinand VI of Spain. The act served as Vigan's modern city charter, converting the municipality into a component city of Ilocos Sur. On January 22, 2001, voters ratified the law in a local plebiscite, officially making Vigan the first city in the province.

==== New7Wonders ====
On December 7, 2014, Vigan was officially chosen as one of the New7Wonders Cities, alongside Beirut, Doha, Durban, Havana, Kuala Lumpur, and La Paz. The global campaign, organized by the New7Wonders Foundation, recognized the city for its unique heritage, preservation efforts, and cultural significance. A formal inauguration plaque was unveiled in Vigan in May 2015 to commemorate its designation.

==== 2022 Luzon earthquake ====
On July 27, 2022, a 7.0 magnitude earthquake struck parts of Luzon, damaging the city's UNESCO World Heritage sites including the Vigan Cathedral and old-century houses, as well as few power lines toppled along Calle Crisologo.

== Geography ==
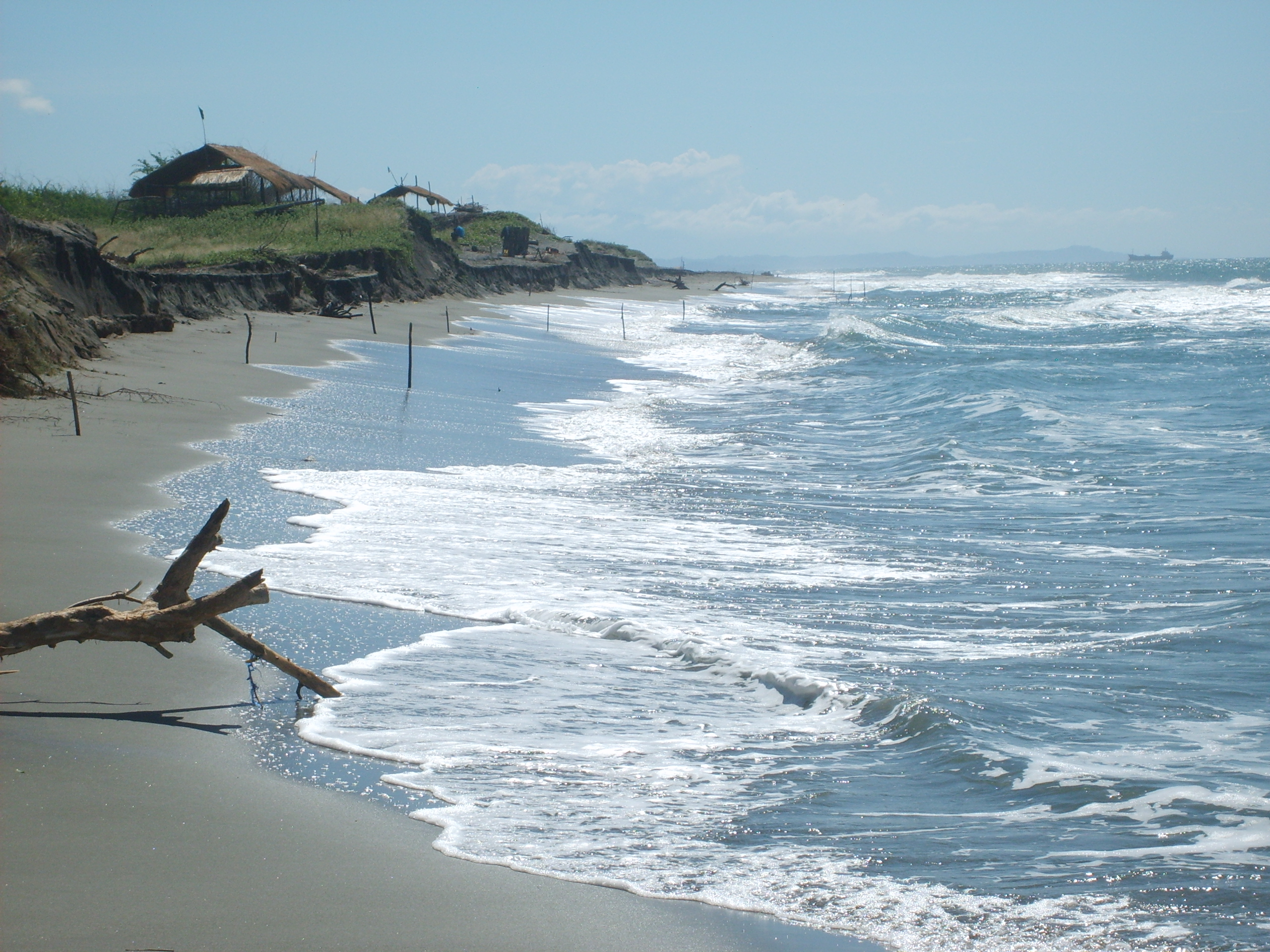
Vigan coast

The City of Vigan is situated in the northern part of Luzon, the Philippines’ largest island. It serves as the capital of Ilocos Sur and has been a major political and trading center since before the Spanish colonizers arrived in the Philippines.

Vigan is situated 403.88 kilometres (250.96 mi) from the capital city of Manila.

=== Topography ===
Its 2,511 hectares (6,200 acres) of land consists mostly of plains with gentle hills. Its boundaries on the north, east, south, and west are the municipalities of Bantay, Santa, Caoayan, and Santa Catalina, respectively. The South China Sea is on its southwest portion.

Majority of its land, 60 percent of it, is used for agriculture. Around 32 percent is made up of residential area, nearly three percent are for commercial and industrial use, and around one percent is for institutional purposes. There are also forest reserves and fishponds included in Vigan's land area.

Vigan is made up of 39 barangays. Thirty of them are classified as rural, but they occupy only 2,366 hectares. The remaining nine are classified as poblacion barangays and are together 144.75 hectares big.

The barangays of Pagburnayan, Paoa, and Tamag are on the area of rolling plains. On the other hand, portions of Barangays Tamag and the barangays of Bulala and Salindeg are found on the city's hilly parts.

Its most dominant hill feature is the Vigan Gap Hill in the eastern part, just 10 kilometers away from the city. Vigan used to be separated from the rest of the mainland by the rivers of Abra, Mestizo and Govantes, making it an island during that time. The Govantes River cuts the current Vigan plain from North to South.

The large Abra and Mestizo rivers, together with the rivers of Bantay, Bantaoay, Nauman and Santo Tomas serve as part of a network that drain the Vigan plains. These rivers are not only important in safekeeping the city from floods, they also served as important ways of transport for trade-related activities from the 15th century to the 19th century, that helped make Vigan a thriving center. The most vital of these rivers is said to be the Mestizo River which was used by the small vessels to transport goods and people.

There is a faulting trend in the Vigan plain that ends in Santa Catalina.

=== Soil type ===
The land area of Vigan is generally flat. Slopes of 20 are found at Barangay V, Tamag, and Paoa. There are no forest reserves in the city in terms of potential and raw materials. Bamboo is the only forest product in Vigan.

There are five soil types in the city. First, the Bantay Loam, located at the southern portion of Raois, has a land area of 36.67 hectares, and is good as pastureland. The second, Umingan sandy, with a land area of 1191.57 hectares, is good for upland rice and vegetables. The third, San Manuel clay loam, which is best for bananas, cotton and vegetables, has an area of 1244.57 hectares. The fourth, Bantog clay—considered as the most significant type for soil, and the best clay material for making pots, jars and all earthenware, has a land area of 31.65 hectares. The fifth, beach sand, with a land area of 7.28 hectares, is generally found on the shores of all the beaches of Vigan, and is best for coconut plantation.

=== Barangays ===
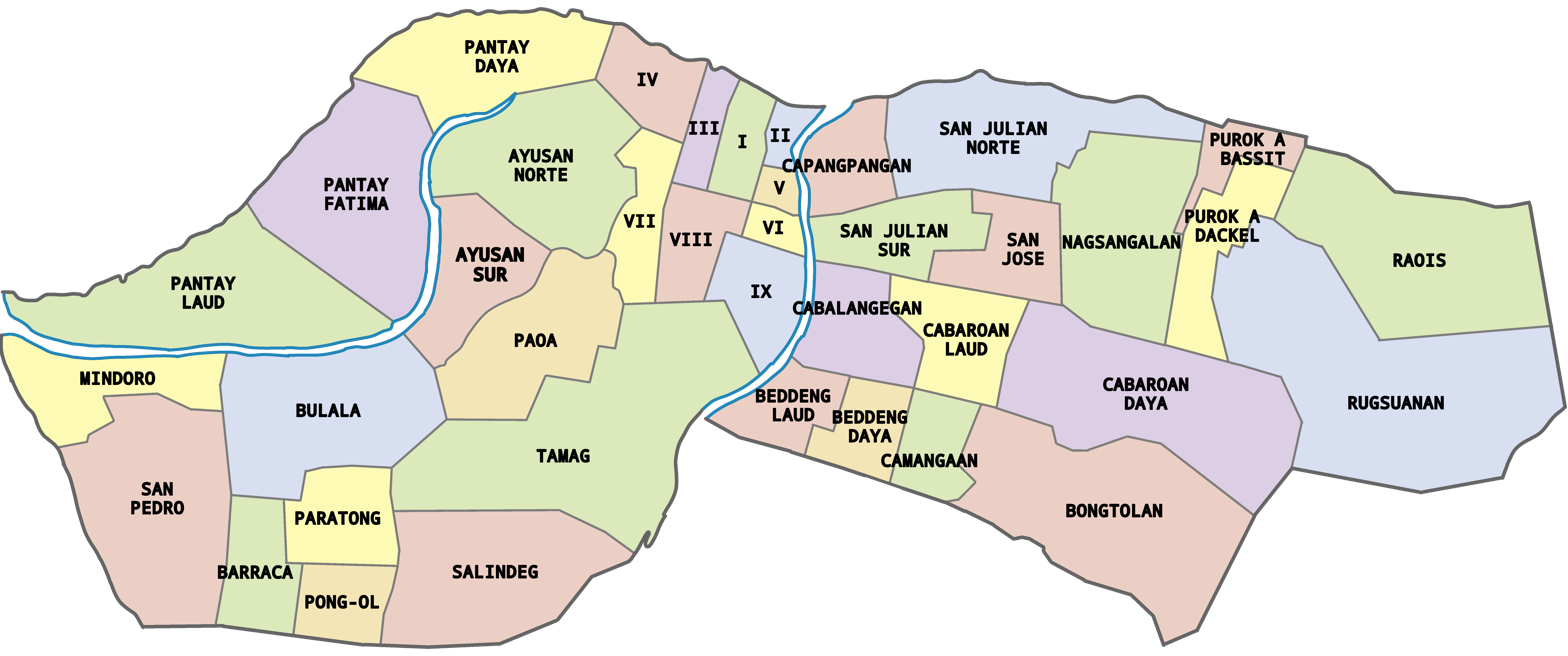
Political Subdivisions of the City of Vigan

Vigan is politically subdivided into 39 barangays. Each barangay consists of puroks and some have sitios.

| PSGC | Barangay | Population | | | ±% p.a. | |
| | | 2024 | | 2010 | | |
|---|---|---|---|---|---|---|
| 12934001 | Ayusan Norte | 6.4% | 3,513 | 2,966 | ▴ | 1.18% |
| 12934002 | Ayusan Sur | 2.1% | 1,158 | 930 | ▴ | 1.53% |
| 12934003 | Barangay I (Poblacion) | 0.6% | 335 | 570 | ▾ | −3.61% |
| 12934004 | Barangay II - Amianance (Poblacion) | 0.9% | 488 | 616 | ▾ | −1.60% |
| 12934005 | Barangay III (Poblacion) | 1.9% | 1,040 | 1,427 | ▾ | −2.17% |
| 12934006 | Barangay IV - Solid West (Poblacion) | 3.9% | 2,121 | 2,239 | ▾ | −0.37% |
| 12934007 | Barangay V - Pagpartian (Poblacion) | 1.2% | 657 | 787 | ▾ | −1.24% |
| 12934008 | Barangay VI - Pagpandayan (Poblacion) | 2.5% | 1,363 | 1,294 | ▴ | 0.36% |
| 12934038 | Barangay VII - Pagburnayan (Poblacion) | 2.6% | 1,415 | 1,409 | ▴ | 0.03% |
| 12934039 | Barangay VIII - Cabasaan/Santa Elena (Poblacion) | 2.2% | 1,197 | 1,557 | ▾ | −1.80% |
| 12934040 | Barangay IX - Cuta (Poblacion) | 4.7% | 2,567 | 2,502 | ▴ | 0.18% |
| 12934009 | Barraca | 0.6% | 348 | 289 | ▴ | 1.29% |
| 12934011 | Beddeng Daya | 1.1% | 617 | 566 | ▴ | 0.60% |
| 12934010 | Beddeng Laud | 1.7% | 903 | 934 | ▾ | −0.23% |
| 12934012 | Bongtolan | 1.4% | 772 | 676 | ▴ | 0.92% |
| 12934013 | Bulala | 4.0% | 2,156 | 2,000 | ▴ | 0.52% |
| 12934014 | Cabalangegan | 1.6% | 851 | 586 | ▴ | 2.62% |
| 12934015 | Cabaroan Daya | 2.1% | 1,129 | 958 | ▴ | 1.14% |
| 12934016 | Cabaroan Laud | 0.9% | 504 | 475 | ▴ | 0.41% |
| 12934017 | Camangaan | 1.7% | 909 | 862 | ▴ | 0.37% |
| 12934018 | Capangpangan | 3.1% | 1,675 | 1,637 | ▴ | 0.16% |
| 12934020 | Mindoro | 2.9% | 1,570 | 1,571 | ▾ | 0.00% |
| 12934021 | Nagsangalan | 3.5% | 1,886 | 1,661 | ▴ | 0.88% |
| 12934022 | Pantay Daya | 4.6% | 2,511 | 2,323 | ▴ | 0.54% |
| 12934023 | Pantay Fatima | 6.1% | 3,314 | 2,513 | ▴ | 1.93% |
| 12934024 | Pantay Laud | 1.5% | 813 | 717 | ▴ | 0.87% |
| 12934025 | Paoa | 1.8% | 993 | 823 | ▴ | 1.31% |
| 12934026 | Paratong | 2.5% | 1,371 | 1,267 | ▴ | 0.55% |
| 12934027 | Pong-ol | 1.2% | 640 | 494 | ▴ | 1.81% |
| 12934028 | Purok-a-bassit | 1.0% | 561 | 559 | ▴ | 0.02% |
| 12934029 | Purok-a-dackel | 1.7% | 946 | 850 | ▴ | 0.74% |
| 12934030 | Raois | 3.0% | 1,634 | 1,459 | ▴ | 0.79% |
| 12934031 | Rugsuanan | 1.3% | 686 | 709 | ▾ | −0.23% |
| 12934032 | Salindeg | 2.4% | 1,311 | 1,273 | ▴ | 0.20% |
| 12934033 | San Jose | 1.7% | 912 | 790 | ▴ | 1.00% |
| 12934034 | San Julian Norte | 5.3% | 2,897 | 2,305 | ▴ | 1.60% |
| 12934035 | San Julian Sur | 2.5% | 1,338 | 1,080 | ▴ | 1.49% |
| 12934036 | San Pedro | 3.3% | 1,781 | 1,227 | ▴ | 2.61% |
| 12934037 | Tamag | 6.6% | 3,616 | 2,846 | ▴ | 1.67% |
| | Total | | 54,498 | 49,747 | ▴ | 0.63% |

=== Geologic base and mineral resources ===
The sedimentary and metamorphic rocks that are present in the city are alluvium, fluviatile, lacustrine, paludal and beach deposits such as coral, stools, and beach rock. These are predominantly found along the coastal areas of Vigan. An important non-metallic mineral resource found in Vigan is the kind of clay that is used in making earthen jars locally called burnay. Earthenware of different uses and sizes are made of this kind of clay. Known as Bantog clay, the mineral is the basic material in making bricks. These bricks are the original materials in building the Hispanic houses of Vigan.

=== Physiography ===
Vigan is situated in a Quaternary Age sedimentary plain called the Vigan-Bantay Plain which is part of the Ilocos coastal plain. The Vigan-Bantay Plain is bounded on the east by a moderately rugged Miocene sediments consisting of interbedded sandstones and shale to very rugged Meta-volcanics and Meta sediment topography; on the south is the Municipality of Santa where the north–south trending fault terminates; to the west is the South China Sea; while the northern boundary opens to the northern extension of the Ilocos coastal plain.

The central part of the plain is characterized by a dissected ridge of Plio-Pleistocene age that trends in a northeast–southwest direction. The ridge divides the Vigan-Bantay Plain into northern and southern plains.

The northern part of the plain is drained by minor rivers namely: Bantaoay, Santo Tomas, and Nauman rivers, while the Abra River is the main drainage network of the southern portion of the plain. The Abra River meanders into the hinterland but exhibits a braided pattern across the plain.

The drainage network of the eastern margin of Vigan-Bantay plain consist of deeply cut valleys whose pattern is strongly controlled by main faulting trends, particularly those in the northerly and easterly directions.

Vigan is being drained by the Vigan River and Bantay River, respectively, on the north and on the south by Mestizo River whose water discharge comes from the Bantaoay head waters.

The relief of the Vigan-Bantay plain is actively level to undulating with a slope ranging from 0% to 8%. Vigan in particular is generally in level with several hills in Barangays Tamag, Bulala, and Salindeg, sometimes reaching about 50 meters in elevation and has a slope ranging from 3% to 8%.

The eastern margin of the plain characterized by a steep to very steep slope, about 40% to 60%, the relief often reaches an elevation of more than 600 meters especially the northerly and easterly portion.

The dominant topographic feature in the eastern margin of the town is the Vigan Gap Hill where the continuously shifting Vigan River cuts its way. The Gap Hill is located approximately 10 kilometers east of Vigan.

=== Weather and climate ===
Climate data for Vigan (1991–2020, extremes 1903–2023)
| Month | Jan | Feb | Mar | Apr | May | Jun | Jul | Aug | Sep | Oct | Nov | Dec | Year |
|---|---|---|---|---|---|---|---|---|---|---|---|---|---|
| Record high °C (°F) | 35.6 (96.1) | 35.7 (96.3) | 36.9 (98.4) | 38.8 (101.8) | 38.2 (100.8) | 38.2 (100.8) | 35.4 (95.7) | 36.9 (98.4) | 35.1 (95.2) | 37.5 (99.5) | 36.7 (98.1) | 35.5 (95.9) | 38.8 (101.8) |
| Mean daily maximum °C (°F) | 30.2 (86.4) | 30.7 (87.3) | 31.8 (89.2) | 33.0 (91.4) | 33.0 (91.4) | 32.2 (90.0) | 31.3 (88.3) | 30.6 (87.1) | 31.0 (87.8) | 31.4 (88.5) | 31.5 (88.7) | 30.9 (87.6) | 31.5 (88.7) |
| Daily mean °C (°F) | 25.7 (78.3) | 26.2 (79.2) | 27.4 (81.3) | 28.7 (83.7) | 29.0 (84.2) | 28.4 (83.1) | 27.7 (81.9) | 27.3 (81.1) | 27.4 (81.3) | 27.4 (81.3) | 27.3 (81.1) | 26.6 (79.9) | 27.4 (81.3) |
| Mean daily minimum °C (°F) | 21.2 (70.2) | 21.6 (70.9) | 23.0 (73.4) | 24.3 (75.7) | 24.9 (76.8) | 24.6 (76.3) | 24.1 (75.4) | 24.0 (75.2) | 23.8 (74.8) | 23.4 (74.1) | 23.2 (73.8) | 22.3 (72.1) | 23.4 (74.1) |
| Record low °C (°F) | 13.5 (56.3) | 14.0 (57.2) | 16.0 (60.8) | 19.3 (66.7) | 19.6 (67.3) | 16.8 (62.2) | 17.8 (64.0) | 17.0 (62.6) | 19.0 (66.2) | 17.2 (63.0) | 15.4 (59.7) | 14.5 (58.1) | 13.5 (56.3) |
| Average rainfall mm (inches) | 5.8 (0.23) | 2.5 (0.10) | 5.4 (0.21) | 17.2 (0.68) | 173.0 (6.81) | 281.8 (11.09) | 529.8 (20.86) | 613.8 (24.17) | 356.2 (14.02) | 134.7 (5.30) | 45.7 (1.80) | 6.2 (0.24) | 2,172.1 (85.52) |
| Average rainy days (≥ 1 mm) | 2 | 2 | 2 | 2 | 9 | 14 | 19 | 19 | 15 | 7 | 4 | 2 | 97 |
| Average relative humidity (%) | 74 | 74 | 74 | 75 | 78 | 82 | 85 | 87 | 86 | 81 | 78 | 75 | 79 |
Source: PAGASA

The city of Vigan falls under tropical savanna, which is characterised by two pronounced seasons; the dry season from November to April and the wet season from May to October. The average annual rainfall is 2,506 millimetres (98.66 in) and the highest recorded rainfall is 6,933 millimetres (272.95 in).

Throughout the year, the average temperature is 26 °C. Likewise, the average daily minimum temperature is 21.1 °C, with the warmest temperature being 30.9 °C. The average annual relative humidity is 81%. An average of 7-10 typhoons hit Vigan annually.

== Demographics ==
Population census of Vigan

| Year | Pop. | ±% p.a. |
|---|---|---|
| 1903 | 14,945 | — |
| 1918 | 17,765 | +1.16% |
| 1939 | 20,939 | +0.79% |
| 1948 | 21,067 | +0.07% |
| 1960 | 25,990 | +1.77% |
| 1970 | 30,252 | +1.53% |

| Year | Pop. | ±% p.a. |
|---|---|---|
| 1975 | 31,971 | +1.11% |
| 1980 | 33,483 | +0.93% |
| 1990 | 38,574 | +1.43% |
| 1995 | 42,067 | +1.64% |
| 2000 | 45,143 | +1.52% |
| 2007 | 47,246 | +0.63% |

| Year | Pop. | ±% p.a. |
|---|---|---|
| 2010 | 49,747 | +1.89% |
| 2015 | 53,879 | +1.53% |
| 2020 | 53,935 | +0.02% |
| 2024 | 54,498 | +0.25% |

Source: Philippine Statistics Authority

=== Population composition ===
Vigan had a population of 53,935 in the 2020 Census of Population and Housing, increasing only slightly from 53,879 in 2015. The city recorded an annual population growth rate of 0.02% between 2015 and 2020. In the 2024 census, Vigan had a population of 54,498 people. The population density was 2,200 inhabitants per square kilometre (5,700/sq mi).

=== Language ===
Ilocano is the predominant language spoken in Vigan and is the most widely spoken language in the city. Filipino and English are also used, particularly in education, government, commerce, and tourism. Other Philippine languages and dialects are also spoken by some residents.

Vigan Cathedral at dawn

=== Religion ===
Vigan has a predominantly Christian population, with Roman Catholicism constituting the largest religious affiliation in the city. Other Christian denominations and religious groups are also represented in Vigan.

== Economy ==
Poverty incidence of Vigan (%)

Source: Philippine Statistics Authority

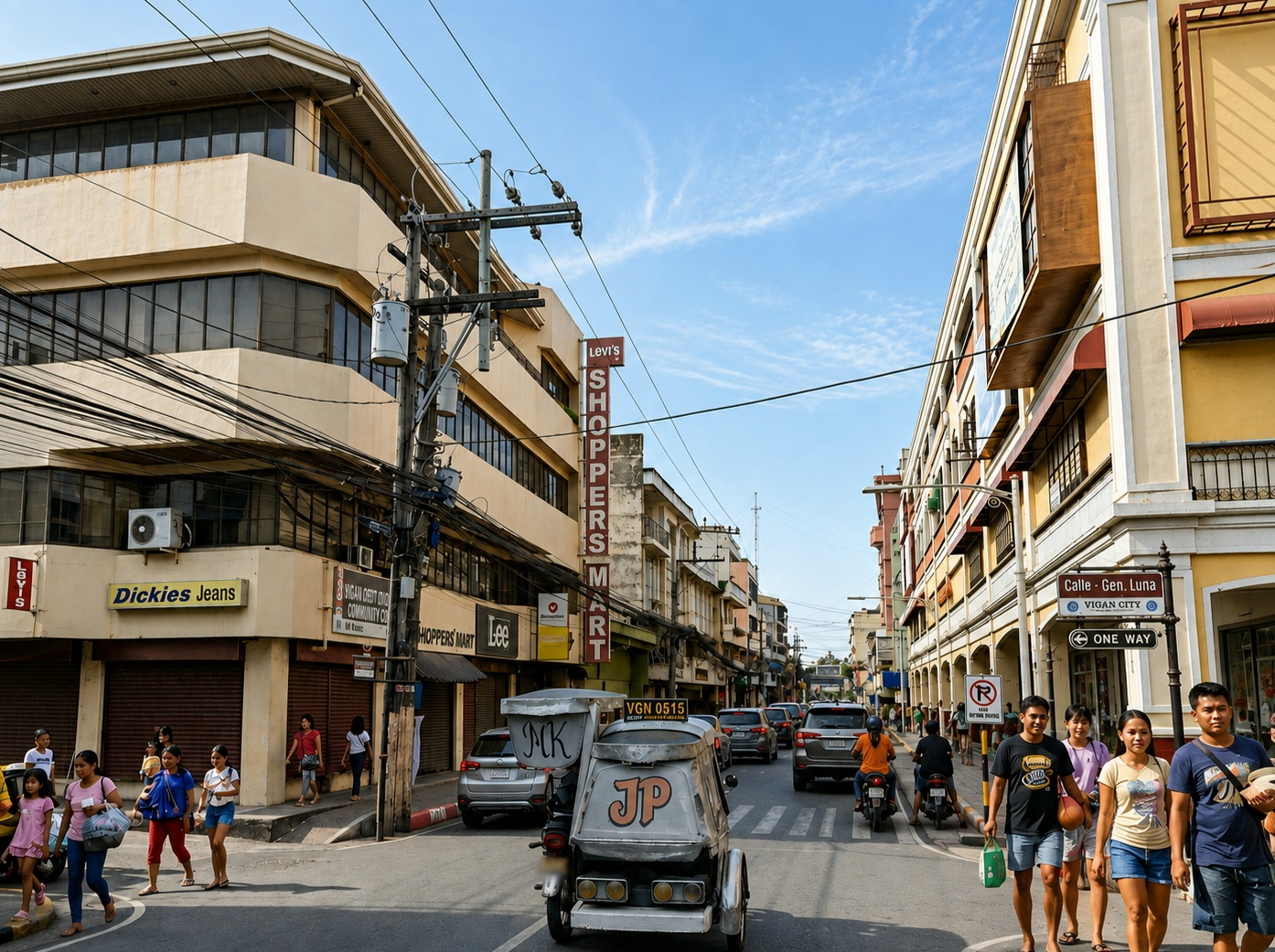
Corner of Quezon Avenue and General Luna Street, an area of major commercial activity in Vigan City.

Vigan has a diversified economy shaped by its historical role as a trading center and its present-day importance as a heritage, commercial, and service center in Ilocos Sur. Its economy includes commerce and trade, services, tourism-related activities, traditional industries, and agriculture. The city's economic development has increasingly been linked with the conservation and adaptive use of its historic urban environment.

=== Commerce and trade ===
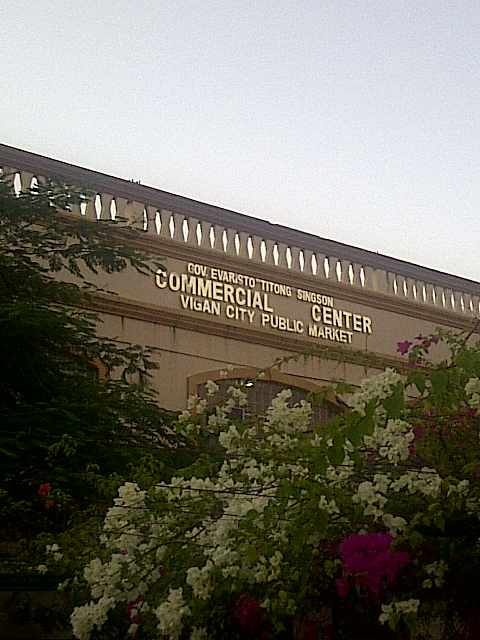
Vigan Public Market

Vigan has historically served as an important commercial and trading center in northern Luzon. During the Spanish colonial period, Chinese and local merchants conducted trade from shops, offices, and storerooms located within the city's traditional two-storey commercial houses. Vigan's historic position as a trading town contributed to the development of its distinctive architecture and urban landscape.

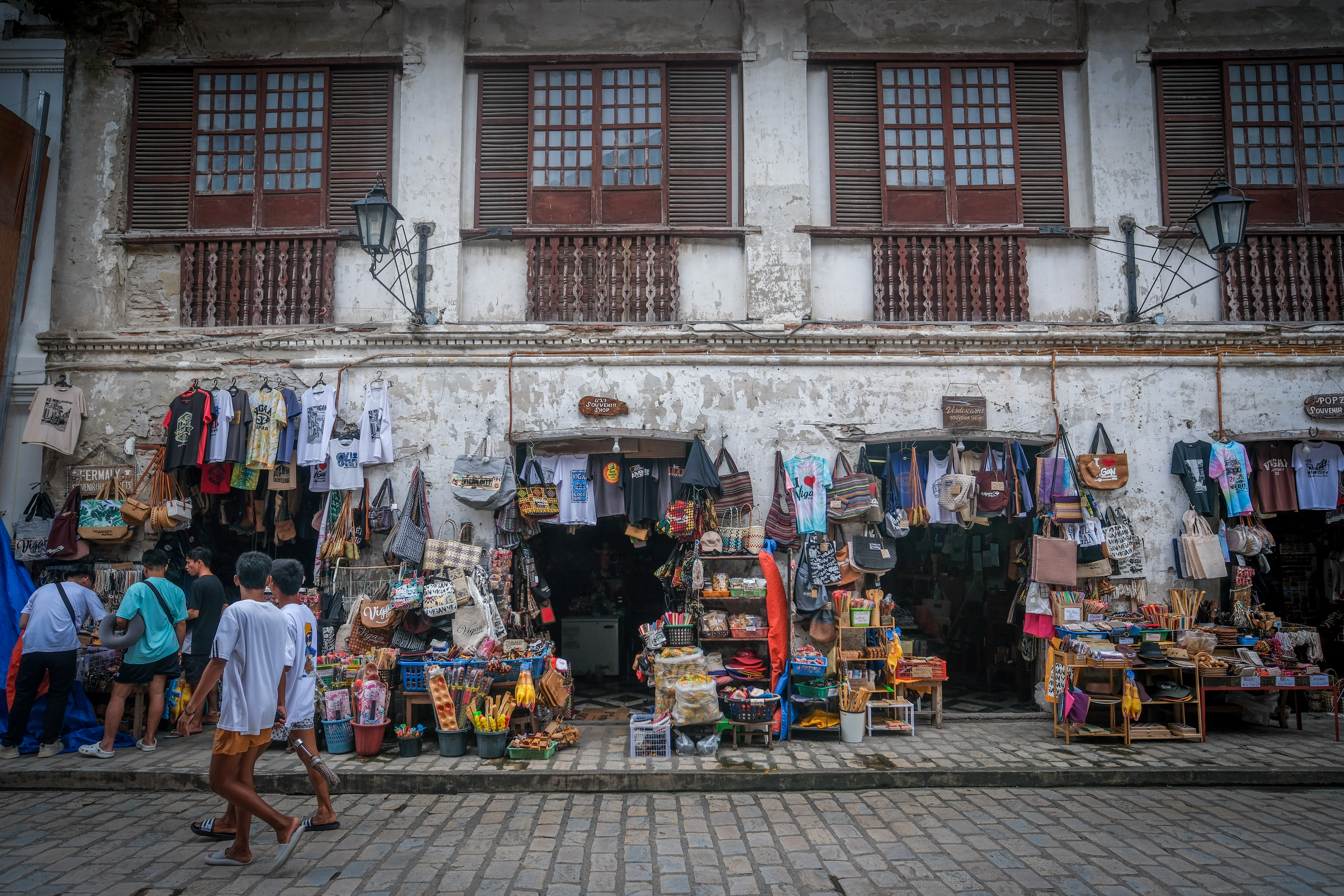
Shops selling local products in Vigan

Commerce remains an important part of the city's economy, with retail trade, markets, financial services, and other businesses serving both the local population and surrounding communities. The Department of Trade and Industry's Cities and Municipalities Competitiveness Index identifies economic dynamism, local economy size and growth, active establishments, employment generation, productivity, and the cost of doing business among the indicators used to assess Vigan's local economy.

=== Services ===
The service sector forms an important part of Vigan's contemporary economy. Commercial services, accommodation, food establishments, transportation, financial services, education, health care, and other professional and personal services support the city's population as well as visitors from other parts of the country and abroad.

The growth of service-oriented activities has accompanied Vigan's transition from its historical role as a trading town toward a more diversified urban economy. The city's heritage conservation program has also encouraged the adaptive reuse of historic buildings for contemporary residential, commercial, cultural, and tourism-related purposes.

=== Traditional industries ===
Traditional industries remain part of Vigan's local economy and cultural identity. Pottery, weaving, and other craft activities provide livelihoods for local artisans while maintaining skills associated with Ilocano heritage. UNESCO has identified the empowerment of local artisans and the development of traditional industries as important elements of Vigan's heritage-based development strategy.

The city's traditional crafts include burnay pottery and abel weaving. These industries have increasingly been connected with cultural tourism and the promotion of locally made products, although their economic role extends beyond tourism through their contribution to local livelihoods and creative industries.

=== Agriculture ===
Agriculture continues to form part of Vigan's economy, particularly in areas outside the densely developed historic and commercial districts. Agricultural activities provide livelihoods for rural households and contribute to the city's supply of food and agricultural products.

The agricultural sector exists alongside the city's increasingly service-oriented and commercial economy, reflecting the contrast between Vigan's urban center and its more rural peripheral areas.

=== Tourism-related economy ===
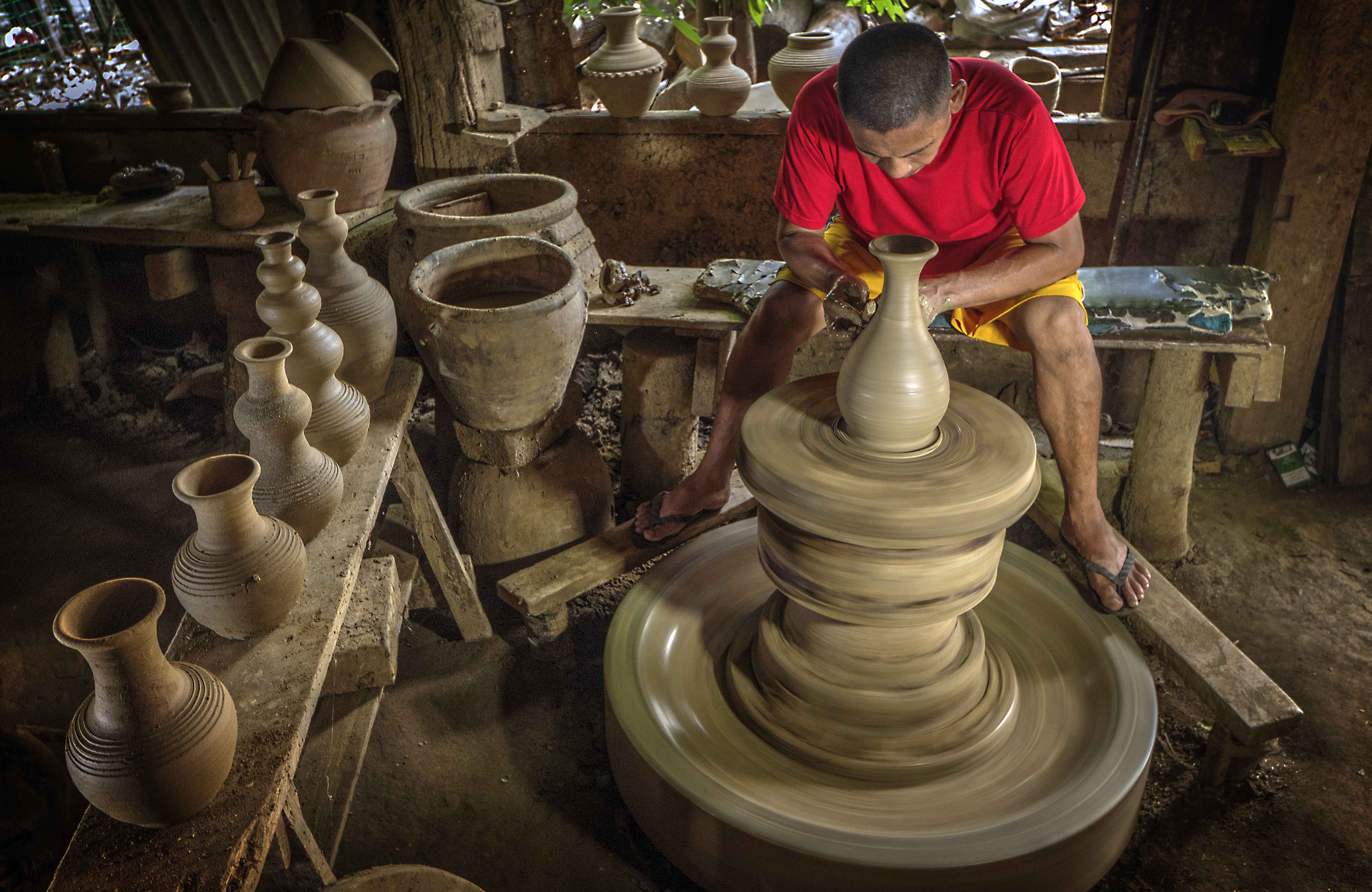
Traditional burnay pottery-making in Pagburnayan, Vigan City

Tourism has become an important component of Vigan's modern economy following the recognition of its historic center as a UNESCO World Heritage Site in 1999. Heritage conservation has been used not only to protect historic buildings and streets but also as a means of supporting livelihoods and local economic development.

Tourism-related economic activity includes accommodation, restaurants, transportation, retail, cultural enterprises, handicrafts, and other services. The growth of heritage tourism has also created opportunities for local businesses and artisans, although UNESCO has noted that increasing tourism and investment can create challenges for small local businesses and the continued use of historic properties.

=== Poverty and economic development ===
Vigan experienced significant economic difficulties during the decades before its inscription as a World Heritage Site. UNESCO reported that, by the mid-1990s, the city faced declining traditional industries, the departure of businesses, deterioration of the historic district, and limited public financial resources. Heritage conservation and tourism development subsequently became part of a broader strategy for economic and social development.

The economic transformation associated with heritage conservation has included improvements in public facilities, support for traditional skills, and increased opportunities for tourism and local businesses. UNESCO recognized Vigan's heritage-management approach as a model of best practice in 2012.

== Government ==
=== Local government ===
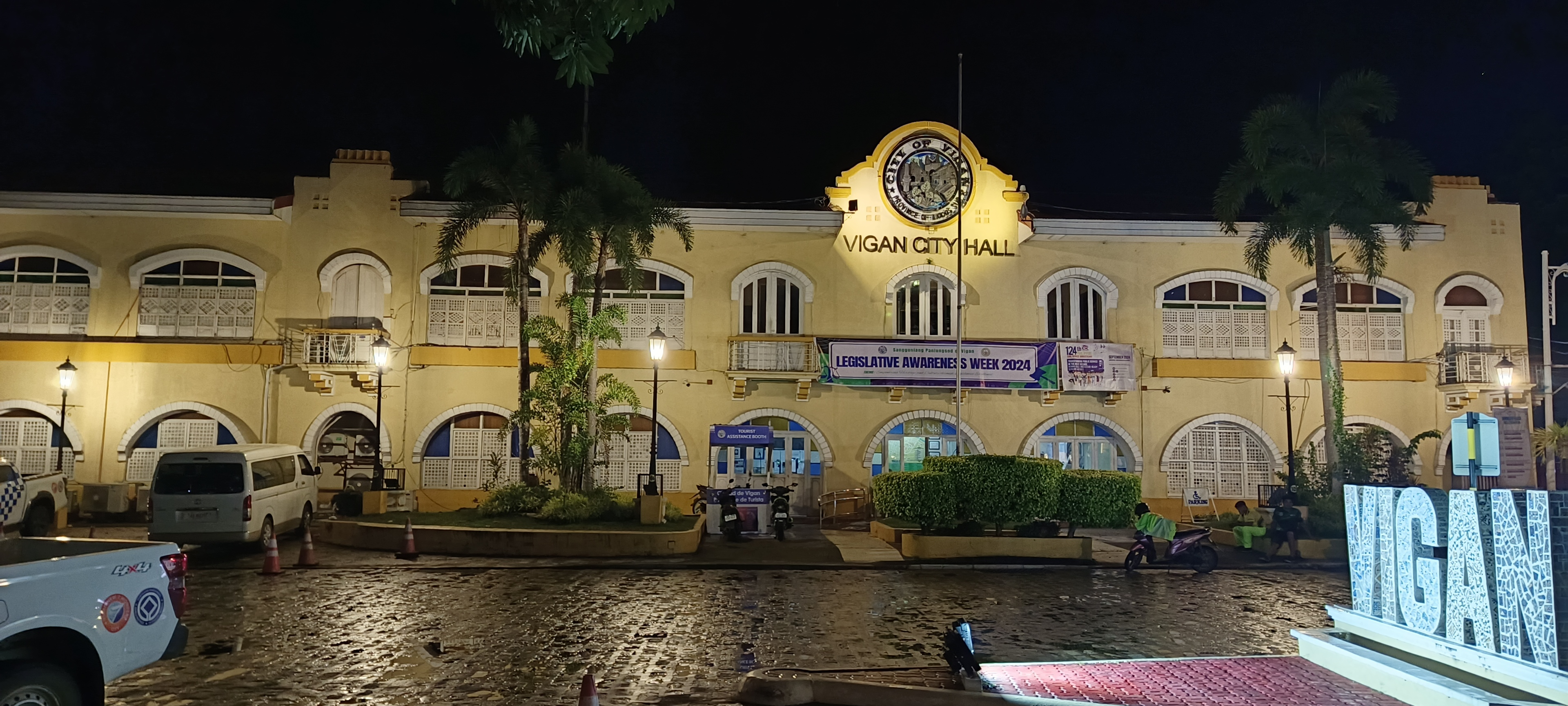
Vigan City Hall

Vigan is part of the first congressional district of the province of Ilocos Sur. It is governed by a mayor, designated as its local chief executive, and by a city council as its legislative body in accordance with the Local Government Code. The mayor, vice mayor, and the councilors are elected directly by the people through an election which is being held every three years.

Ilocos Sur Provincial Capitol Building

=== Elected officials ===
| Position | Name |
|---|---|
| District Representative (1st Legislative District the Province of Ilocos Sur) | Ronald Singson |
| Chief Executive of the City of Vigan | Mayor Randolf V. Singson |
| Presiding Officer of the City Council of Vigan | Atty. Glendale Benzon |
| Councilors of the City of Vigan | Kisses Agdamag-Lim |
| Councilors of the City of Vigan | Joy Bennette Orio |
| Councilors of the City of Vigan | Evaristo "Bobit" Singson III |
| Councilors of the City of Vigan | Larry Raboy |
| Councilors of the City of Vigan | Jay F. Andia |
| Councilors of the City of Vigan | Karen Baquiran |
| Councilors of the City of Vigan | Nestor Pajaro |
| Councilors of the City of Vigan | Ramil Arce |
| Councilors of the City of Vigan | Ada Joana Fe Artajos |
| Councilors of the City of Vigan | Edmund Ayco |

== Architecture ==
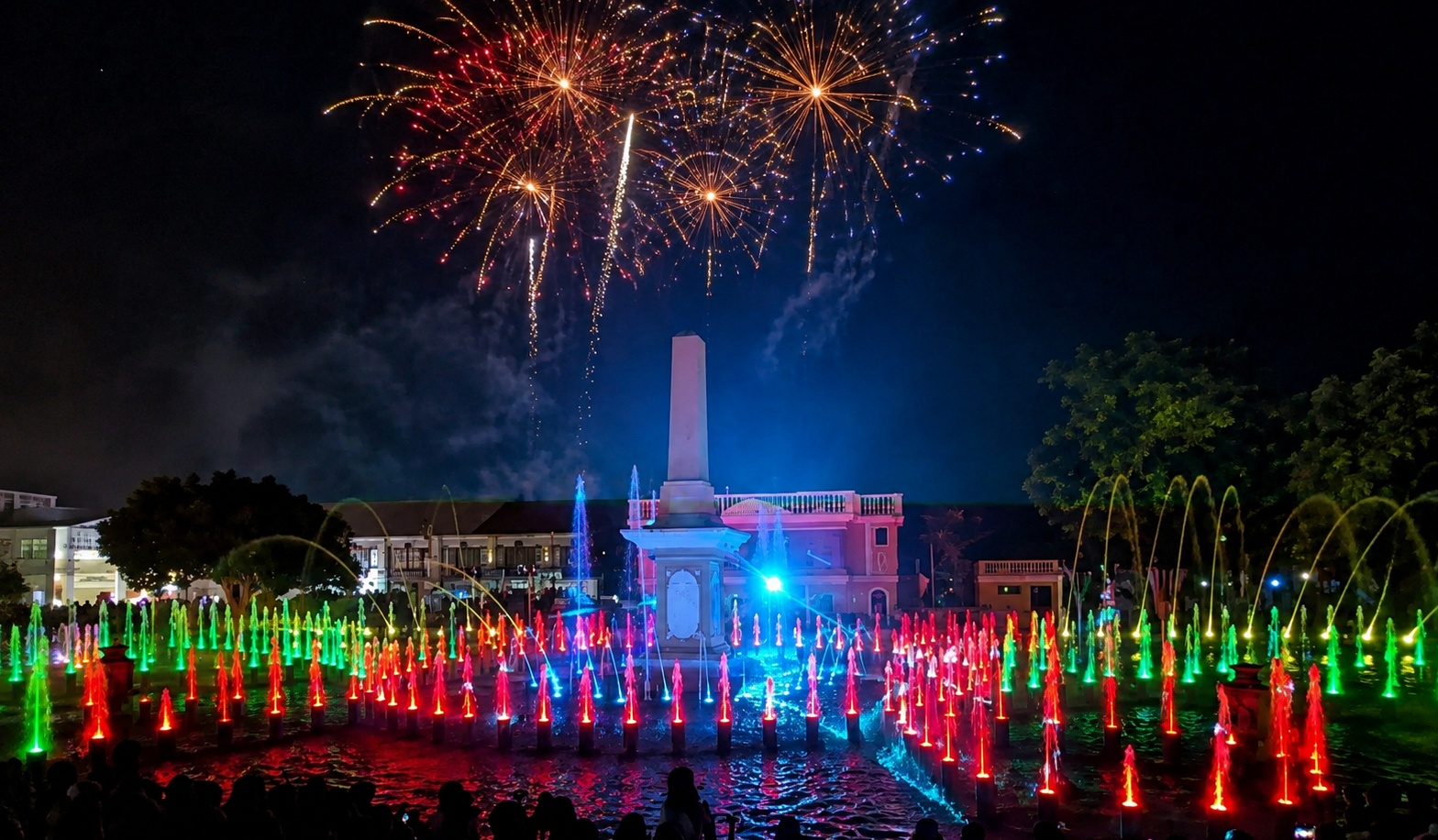
Dancing fountain display at Plaza Salcedo, illuminated with colorful lights during a nighttime presentation.

When Juan de Salcedo founded Vigan in 1572, he decided to pattern its urban plan with that of Intramuros, the walled city in Manila.

The urban planners of the Spanish government also followed a basic pattern that can be observed in most old towns in the country, whose establishment dates back to the Spanish colonial period. This pattern is detailed in the Leyes de Indias, the Law of the Indies, and was put into force in the 18th century. Under the Laws of the Indies streets were to follow a grid pattern, with a plaza or central park at the center.

In Vigan, the central park is the Plaza Salcedo. Next to it are the administrative buildings—the Casa Real or provincial administrative office, and the municipio (municipal hall). A stone's throw away are the religious buildings—the seminary of the archdiocese, the Arzobispado (Archbishop's Palace), and the St. Paul's Cathedral. Beside these religious structures is the church-run school, the Saint Paul College, known in its early days as the Colegio de Niñas. After the full transfer of the said school to the neighboring towns of Bantay and San Vicente, the building was handed over to the Archdiocese of Nueva Segovia and is currently being occupied by a retail store chain, with only a commemorative plaque at the building's entrance and the old "ROSARY COLLEGE" concrete sign at its rear reminding visitors of its past (the school's old logo, once found at the building's facade, has been removed sometime later).

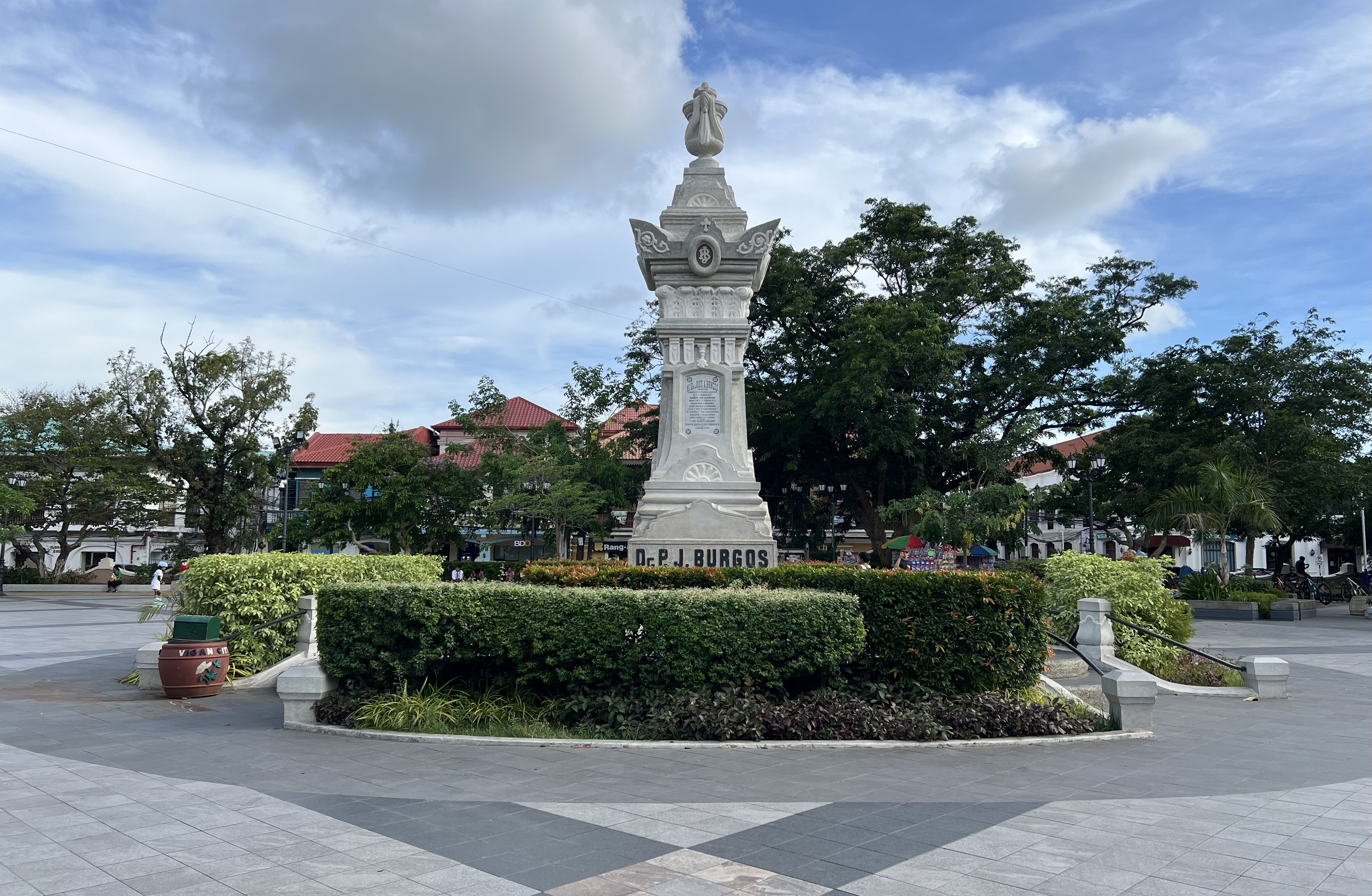
Plaza José Burgos

A unique thing is the existence of another plaza, the Plaza Burgos, which is immediately beside the St. Paul's Cathedral. After the first tier emanating from Plaza Salcedo are the houses of prominent residents that now make up the preserved heritage houses of Vigan. This urban plan remained relatively intact despite wars and natural calamities that have been endured by Vigan since its foundation.

The major changes to the original urban landscape were caused by fires. The Casa Real was replaced with a provincial capitol building during the American period when the original structure burned down. The archdiocese seminary was also destroyed by fire in 1968, and it lay in ruins until the late 1990s, when part of a shopping mall was built on the site.

The residential areas were likewise not spared. Some of the houses on Crisologo Street were casualties of fire during the Japanese period; several houses on Quezon Avenue were destroyed by fire in 1952; while in 1971, some houses near Plaza Burgos burned down as well. The houses along Crisologo Street that were burned were later reconstructed faithfully, following the architecture of the former structures.

Presently, there are other major areas of activities other than the two plazas, though these are still where most recreation and shopping are done. One may also go to the southern part of the city to reach the commercial area and public market. The current public market is a new one, as the old one (formerly the Imelda Socio-Commercial Complex), on the same site, was (also) destroyed by fire. A new mall (opened in December 2017) was constructed on the site of the city's first Public Market, found in the center of the business district, after being the site of some business establishments and a tricycle-for-hire terminal.

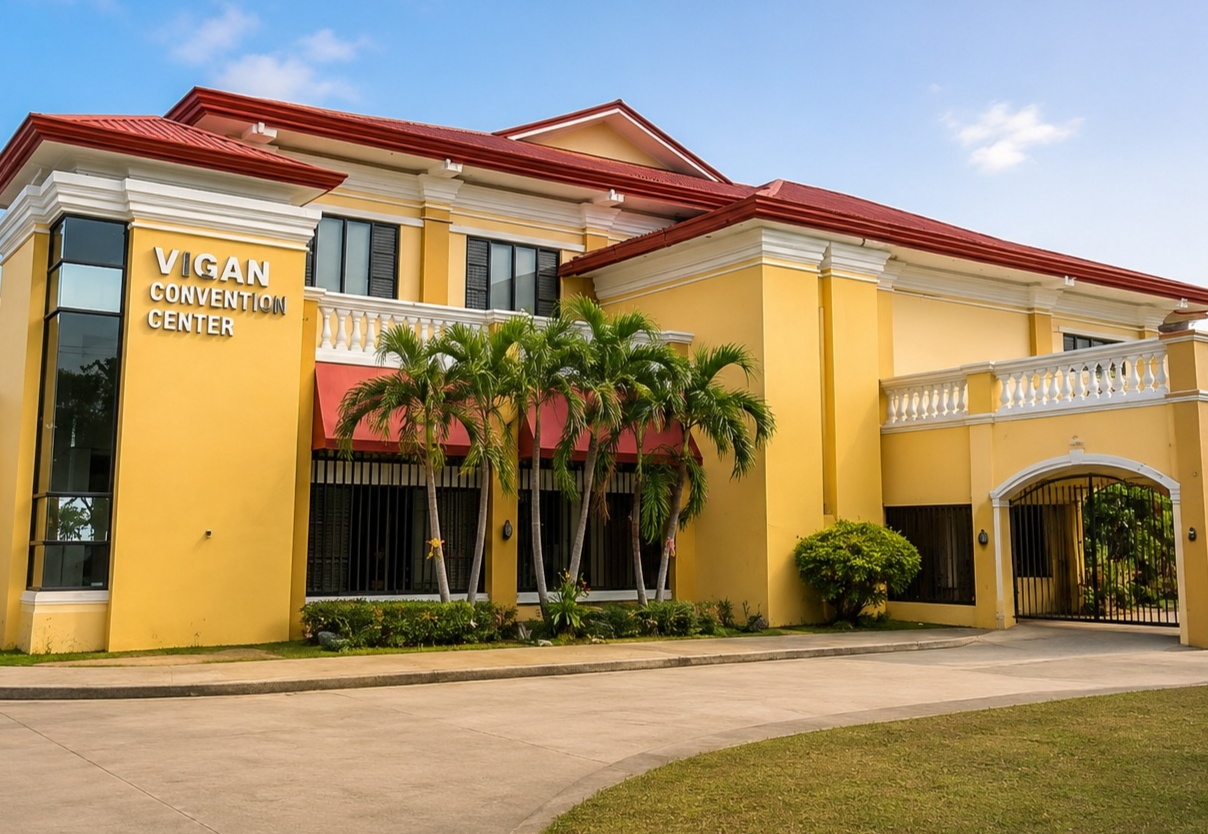
Vigan Convention Center

The Vigan Convention Center, completed and inaugurated in 2012, is another example of contemporary architecture that draws inspiration from the city's traditional architectural heritage. The building was designed based on the existing Vigan antique houses, using a modern interpretation of the Neo-Vigan Bahay na Bato concept. Despite its contemporary function as a large convention and events facility, its architectural design incorporates elements associated with Vigan's traditional built environment. The center has a land area of approximately 7,915 square metres and a building area of about 3,103 square metres. Its grand hall can accommodate up to 2,912 people in a theater-style seating arrangement and can be divided into five smaller function halls. The interior is decorated with artworks and mural paintings depicting significant historical events and products of Vigan. The building demonstrates how Vigan's modern public architecture can incorporate elements of the city's historic architectural identity while serving contemporary functions. This approach complements Vigan's broader effort to preserve its historic character while allowing modern facilities to coexist with its heritage environment.

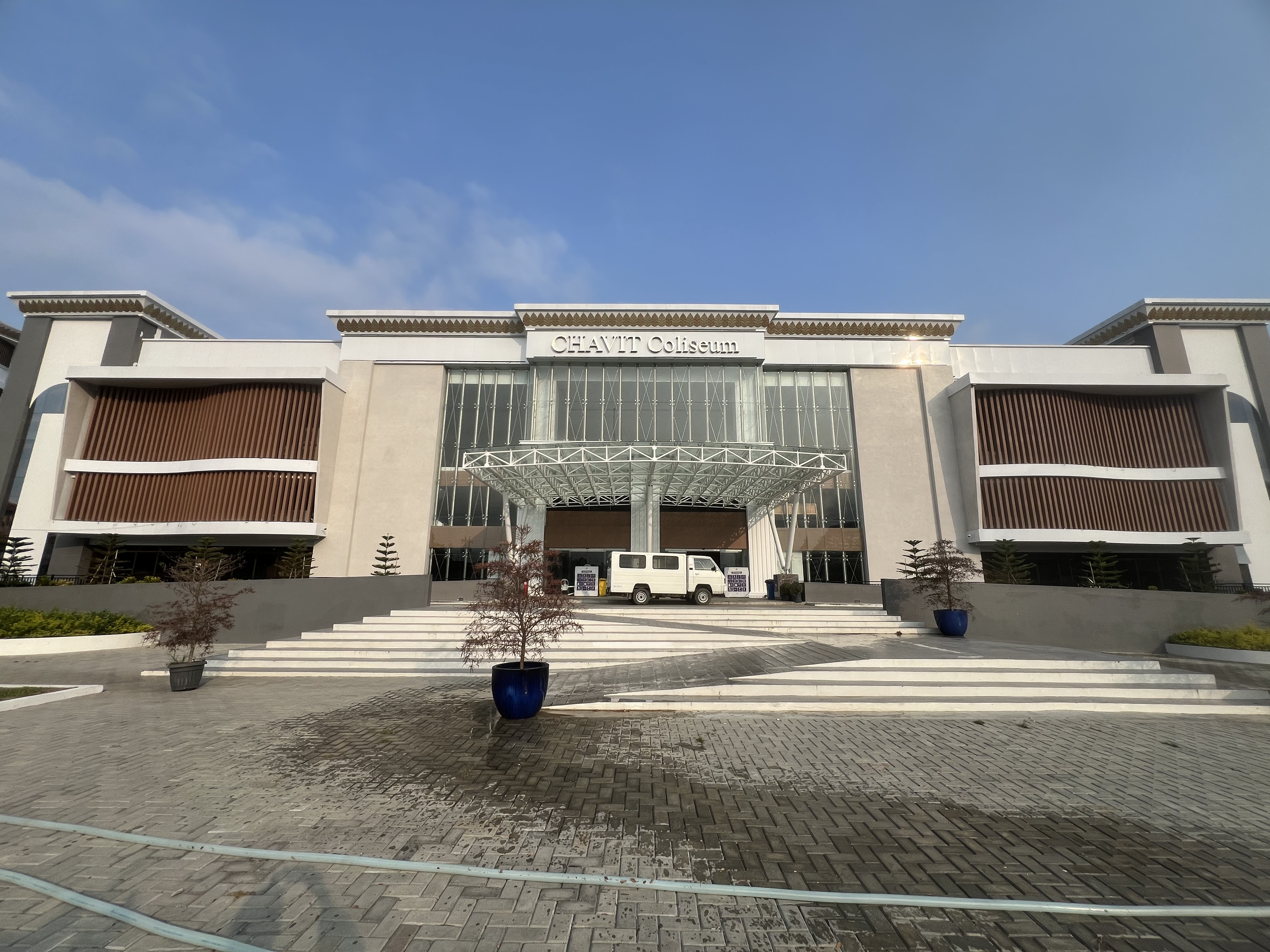
Chavit Coliseum

The Chavit Coliseum, a modern indoor arena in Barangay Tamag, represents a more recent addition to Vigan's built environment. Opened in June 2025, the facility has a seating capacity of about 9,000 and is designed to accommodate sporting events, concerts, conferences, and other large gatherings. Unlike the historic structures of Vigan's heritage core, the Coliseum uses a contemporary architectural approach suited to a large-span sports and events facility. Its exterior incorporates modern monumental forms and architectural finishes while serving as a major civic and entertainment venue for the city. The building therefore forms part of the newer urban landscape of Vigan rather than the city's Spanish-colonial architectural heritage.

Vigan's architecture as a whole reflects a distinctive fusion of Asian and European influences. UNESCO describes the city's historic architecture as a combination of influences from the Philippines and China with those of Europe and Mexico, particularly evident in its grid-patterned urban plan and its traditional bahay na bato buildings.

== Tourism ==
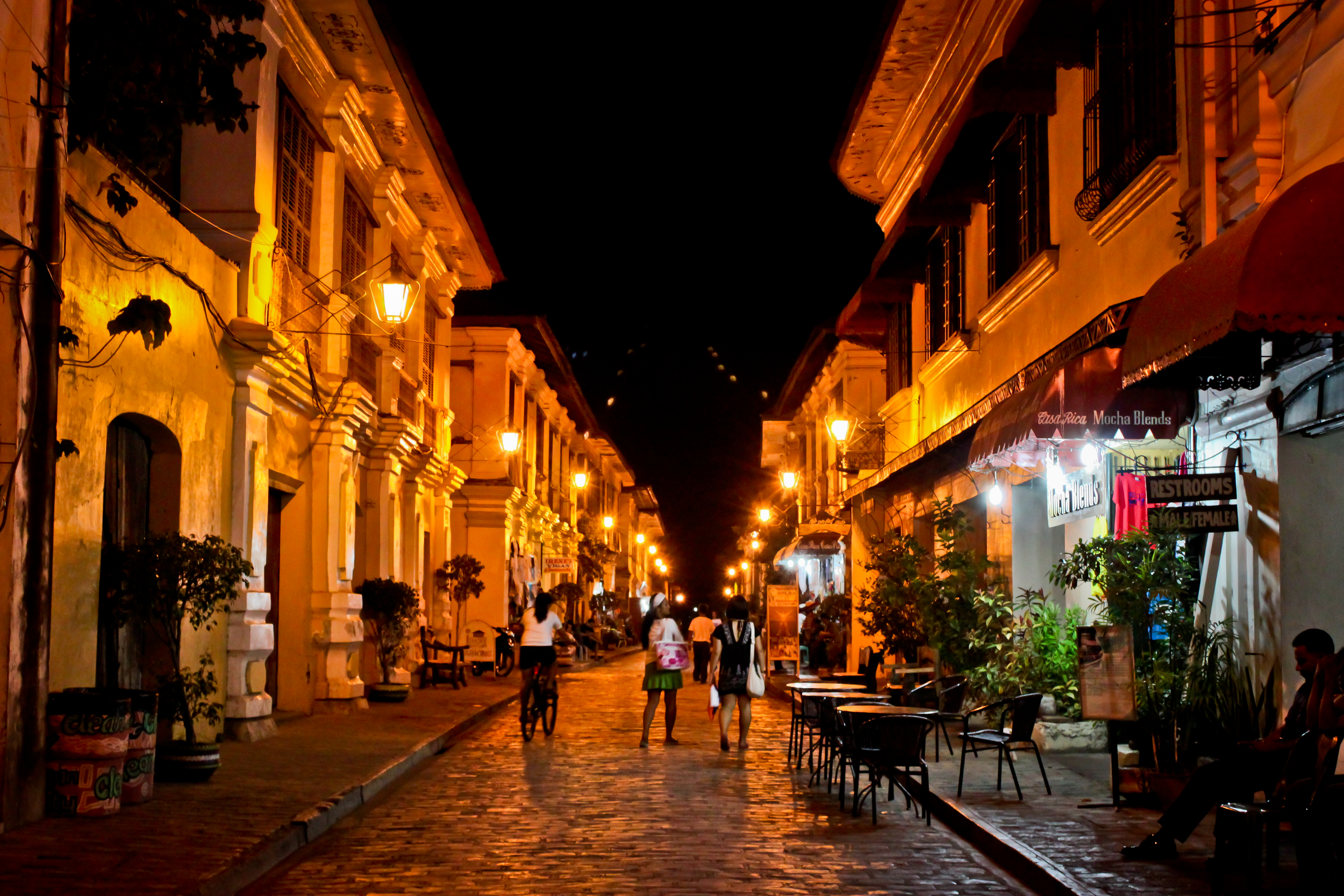
Calle Crisologo at night

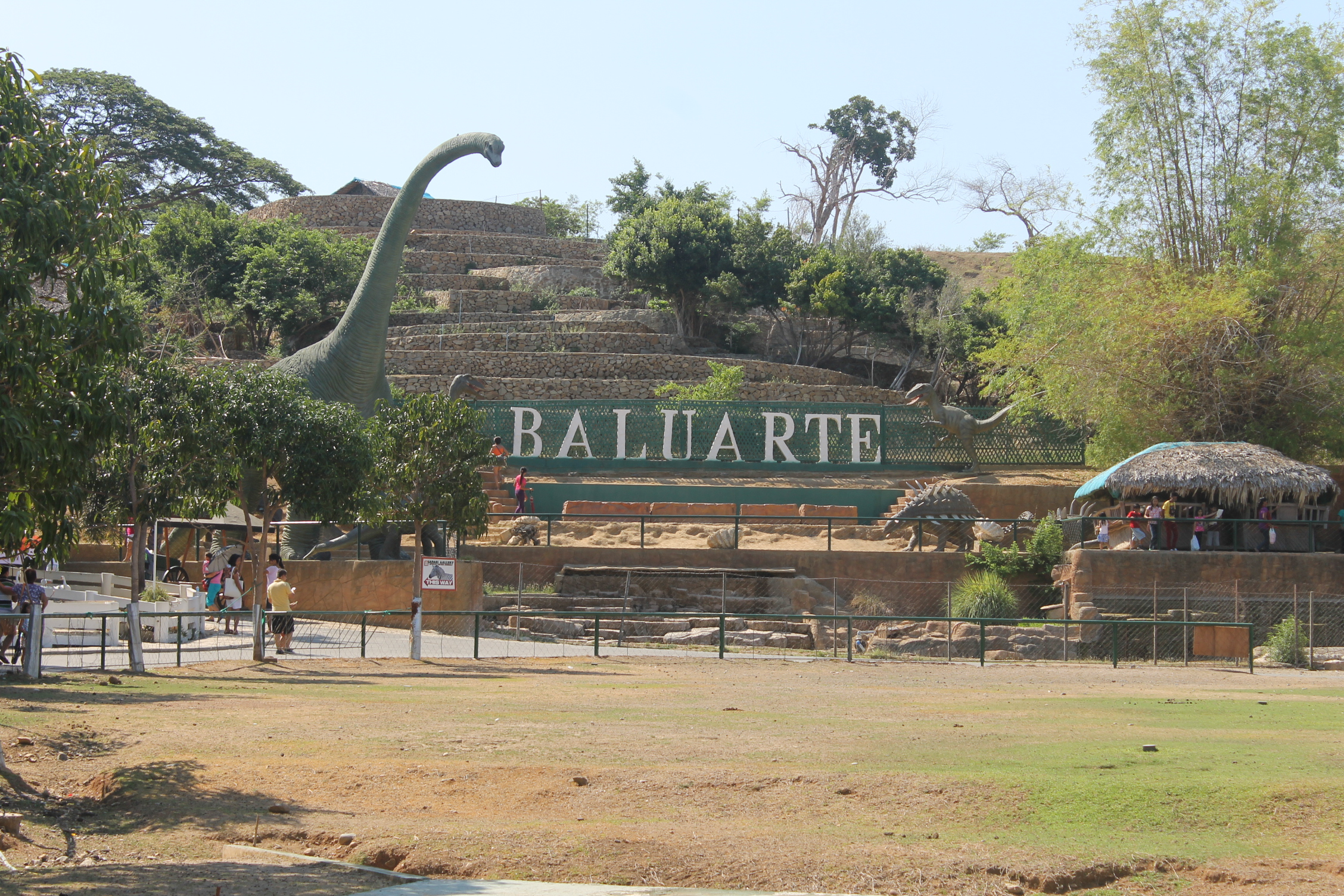
Baluarte Zoo

Vigan is one of the Philippines' principal heritage tourism destinations and is particularly known for its preserved Spanish colonial-era urban landscape. The Historic City of Vigan was inscribed on the UNESCO World Heritage List in 1999 as an exceptionally well-preserved example of a planned Spanish colonial town in Asia. Its architecture and townscape reflect the blending of Filipino, Ilocano, Chinese, European, and Mexican influences. The historic property contains 233 historic buildings arranged along a grid of 25 streets, with Plaza Salcedo and Plaza Burgos forming the principal public spaces of the historic core.

Popular tourist destinations include Calle Crisologo in the Mestizo District, the Syquia Mansion Museum, Plaza Salcedo and its dancing fountain, Padre Burgos House, Baluarte Zoo, and the National Museum of the Philippines–Ilocos Regional Museum Complex. Nearby attractions include the Bantay Church and Bell Tower. Hotel Luna, a historic hotel and art venue, houses a collection of artworks, including La Mandolinera (The Mandolin Player) by Juan Luna. Other popular attractions include the Hidden Garden in Barangay Bulala, known for its eco-tourism garden resort and local cuisine, as well as the Mira Hills – ONE Ilocos Sur Waterpark in Barangay Pagburnayan, a recreational resort complex featuring a wave pool, water slides, and leisure amenities.

=== Heritage tourism ===
Calle Crisologo is the best-known tourist area in Vigan and is characterized by its sett pavement and rows of preserved ancestral houses. Many of the buildings combine brick and stone lower levels with wooden upper floors, capiz-shell windows, and steeply pitched roofs. The street contains shops, restaurants, souvenir stores, and other establishments operating within historic structures. Traditional kalesas, or horse-drawn carriages, are also used in the historic district and form an important part of the city's tourism experience.

Other heritage attractions include the Plaza Salcedo and Plaza Burgos areas, ancestral houses in the Mestizo District, and several museums housed in historic buildings. The city's heritage tourism program emphasizes the preservation of historic structures while allowing them to accommodate contemporary residential, commercial, cultural, and tourism-related uses.

=== Museums and cultural attractions ===
The Ilocos Regional Museum Complex of the National Museum of the Philippines includes the Old Carcel and Padre Burgos House in Vigan. The Old Carcel began as a small town prison in 1657 and later served as the provincial jail of Ilocos Sur. It now houses exhibitions including the series of paintings about the Basi Revolt by Esteban Villanueva, which depicts the 1807 Ilocos revolt, as well as exhibitions on the history and culture of the region and memorabilia associated with former Philippine President Elpidio Quirino.

Padre Burgos House

The Padre Burgos House, an ancestral house associated with Filipino priest and reformist José Burgos, contains period furnishings and the Abel Iloko Exhibition, which presents the traditional textile-weaving heritage of the Ilocos region. The museum complex forms part of Vigan's broader cultural and heritage tourism program.

Crisologo Museum

Other museums and heritage attractions include the Syquia Mansion Museum, which preserves the ancestral home and collections of the Syquia family and is associated with former Philippine President Elpidio Quirino, as well as the Crisologo Museum and other ancestral houses that have been opened to visitors.

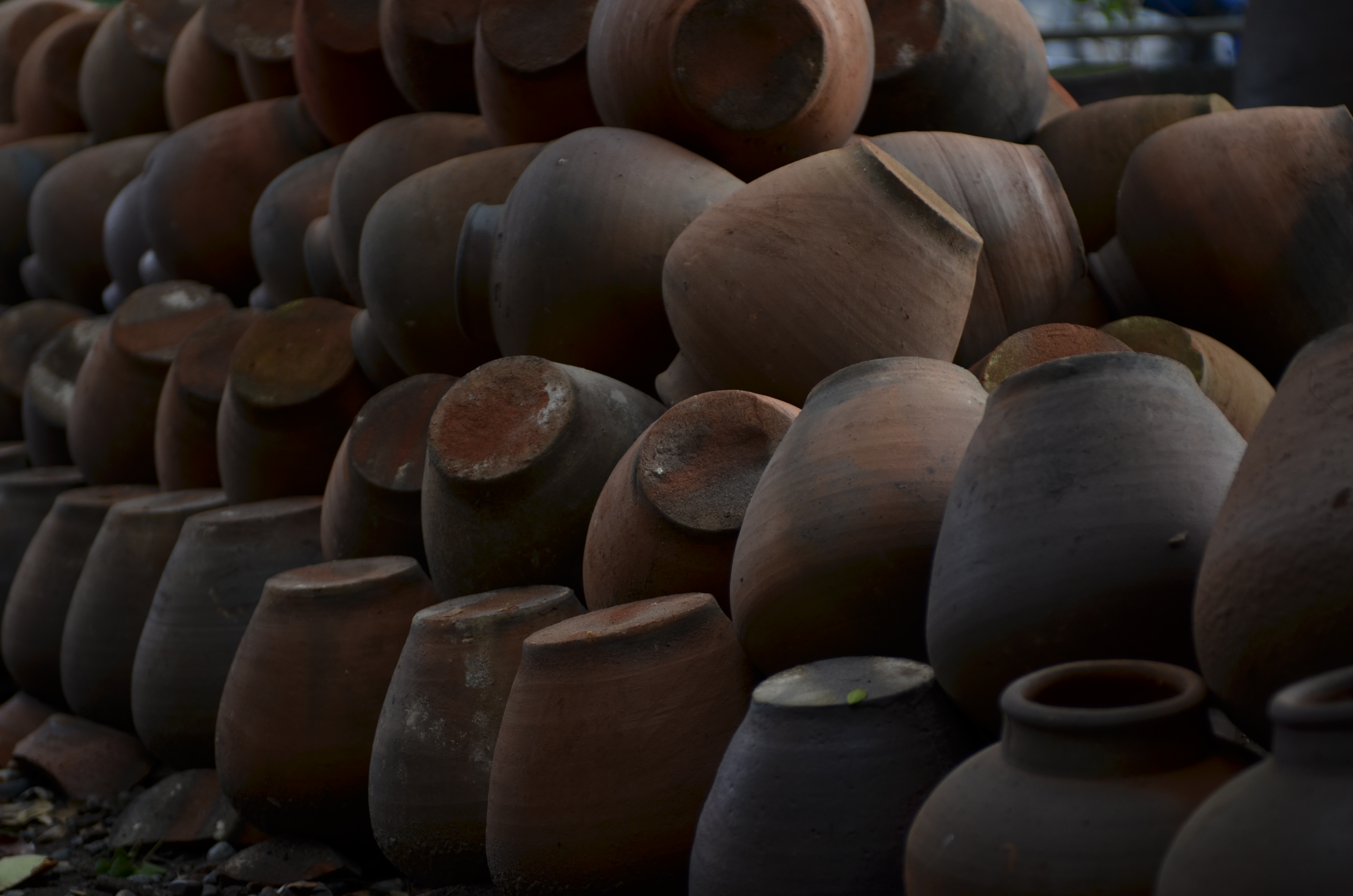
Vigan burnay jars

=== Traditional crafts ===
Traditional crafts are an important component of Vigan's cultural tourism. The city is known for burnay, a traditional form of pottery made from local clay. Visitors can visit pottery workshops in the Pagburnayan area and observe traditional jar-making techniques. Some workshops also provide opportunities for visitors to experience pottery-making themselves.

Vigan is also associated with Abel Iloko, the traditional handwoven textile of the Ilocos region. Weaving demonstrations and textile products allow visitors to learn about traditional weaving techniques and the continuing role of handwoven textiles in Ilocano culture. The preservation and transmission of these traditional skills form part of Vigan's wider heritage-conservation program.

=== Culinary tourism ===
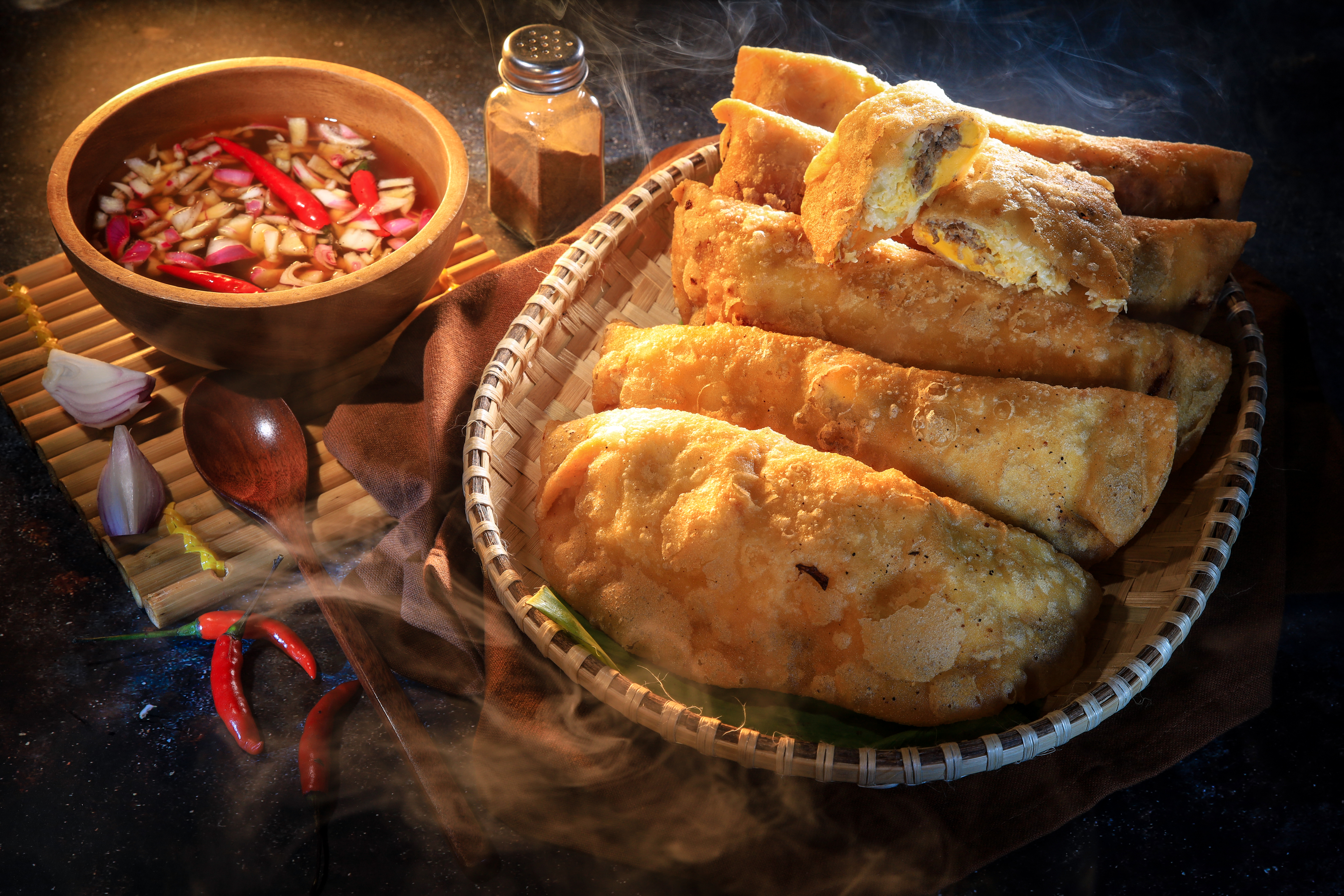
Vigan empanada

Vigan is also known for its Ilocano cuisine and food products. Among the city's best-known specialties are Vigan longganisa, Vigan empanada, and bagnet, together with other traditional Ilocano dishes. Vigan longganisa is particularly associated with the city's identity and is recognized as one of its principal local products.

Food-related activities and festivals have become part of the city's tourism program. The annual Longganisa Festival includes food-related events and competitions that promote local cuisine and the city's traditional sausage-making industry.

=== Festivals and cultural events ===
Vigan hosts a number of cultural, religious, and civic festivals throughout the year. These events contribute to the city's cultural tourism and attract visitors from other parts of the Philippines and abroad.

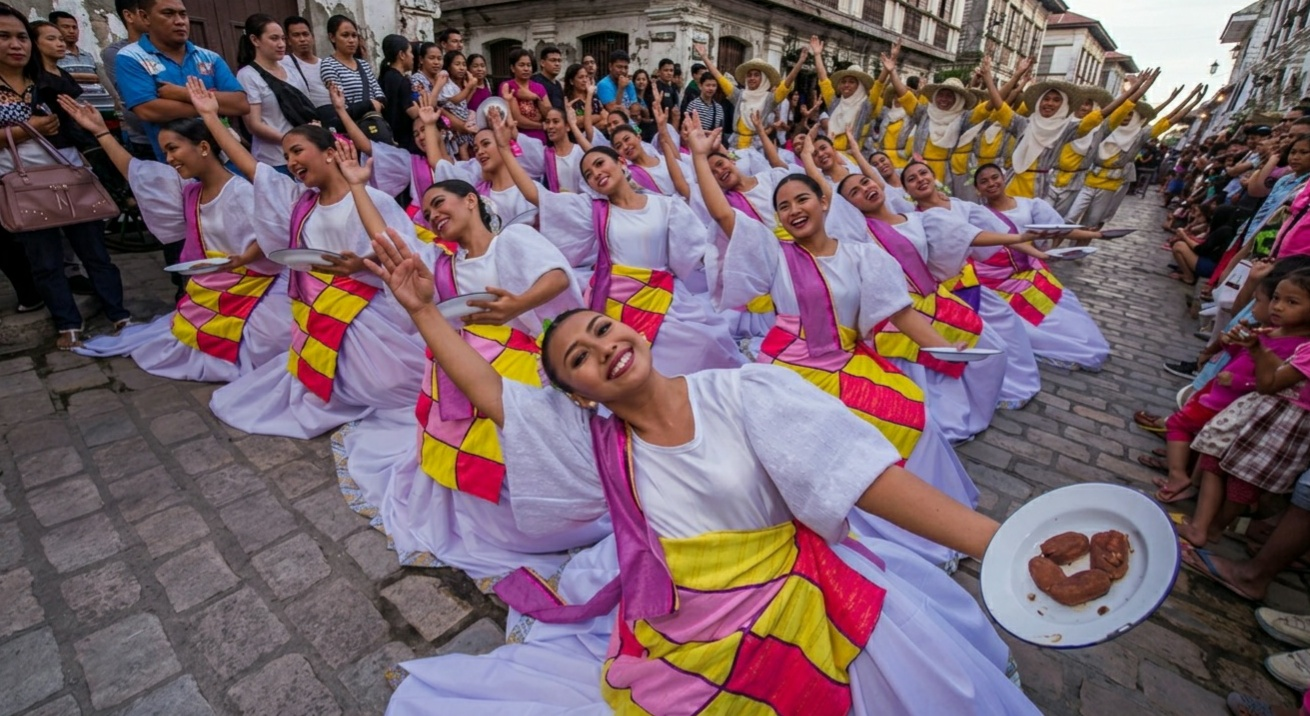
Performers in traditional-inspired costumes presenting a street dance during the Vigan Longganisa Festival.

The Vigan City Fiesta and Longganisa Festival is held annually in January in connection with the Feast of the Conversion of Saint Paul and the anniversary of Vigan's cityhood. Activities include parades, cultural performances, food-related events, competitions, and the promotion of Vigan longganisa as one of the city's best-known local products. The Longganisa Festival has become a major component of the city's annual fiesta celebrations.

In 2024, Mayor Jose "Bonito" Singson Jr. led the Grand Parade of the Vigan City Fiesta and Vigan Longganisa Festival. The January 18–27 celebration featured the Banaoang Marathon, LGBTQIA+ Day, a Vigan Conservation Complex symposium, Community Alay Gupit, a talent and fashion show, the Vigan Food Festival, the Search for Miss Vigan, Dog and Cat Fun Day, the Longganisa Street Dance Showdown, the Pinaka-Livestock contest, Education Day, and Social Services Night. On January 22, 2024, the city also launched the cookbook "101 Ways to Cook Longganisa" as part of the festival.

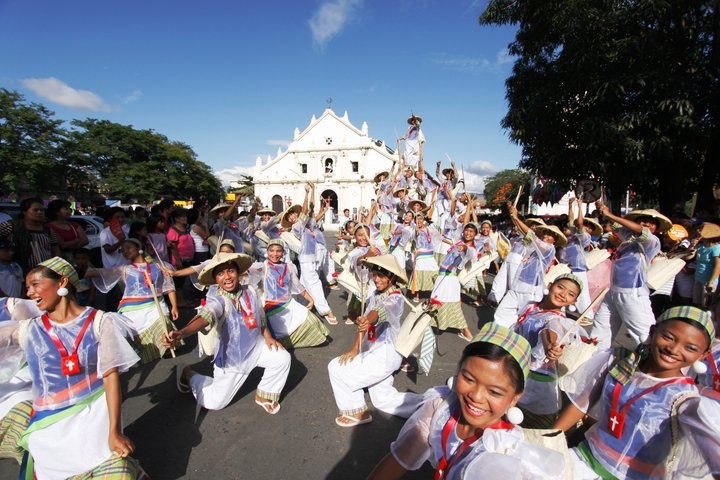
A street dance performance during the Viva Vigan Binatbatan Festival of the Arts in Vigan City.

The Viva Vigan Binatbatan Festival of the Arts is another major cultural celebration. It features cultural performances, parades, arts and crafts activities, traditional practices, and events promoting the cultural heritage and creative industries of Vigan. The annual kalesa competition is also associated with the festival and has been held since 2003, highlighting the continuing cultural importance of the traditional horse-drawn carriage.

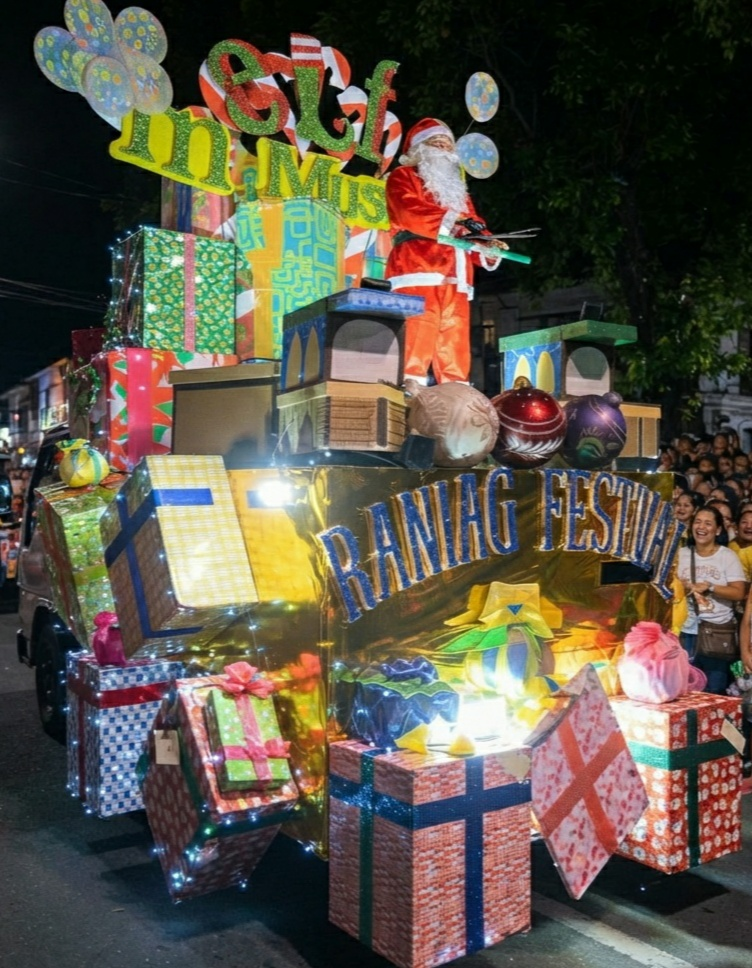
A vibrant float parading down the historic streets during the Vigan Raniag Twilight Festival, a major tourism highlight in the city.

The Raniag: Twilight Festival is an annual celebration held during the last week of October through November 2 in connection with All Saints' Day and All Souls' Day. The word raniag means "bright light" in Ilocano and refers to the lighting of candles for departed loved ones. The festival began in 2010 as a cultural expression of remembrance for the dead. Its activities have included illuminated displays, cultural performances, street dancing, and other events that combine traditional observances with contemporary forms of artistic expression. The festival has attracted large crowds of local residents and tourists.

Holy Week (Semana Santa) is also an important period for religious and cultural tourism in Vigan. The city's historic churches, particularly the Metropolitan Cathedral of the Conversion of Saint Paul, become centers of religious observance during Lent. Activities associated with Holy Week include religious processions, church visits, prayer, and other Catholic devotional practices. Vigan's historic religious architecture and long-established Catholic traditions contribute to its appeal as a destination for religious and heritage tourism during the Lenten season. The city's tourism authorities have identified the Lenten celebration as one of Vigan's significant tourism activities, while regional authorities regularly prepare for increased visitor and pilgrim traffic during Holy Week.

Other celebrations include the World Heritage Cities Solidarity Cultural Festival, which features cultural performances and competitions involving local communities and schools, as well as Christmas celebrations and other civic and religious activities.

=== Kalesa tradition ===
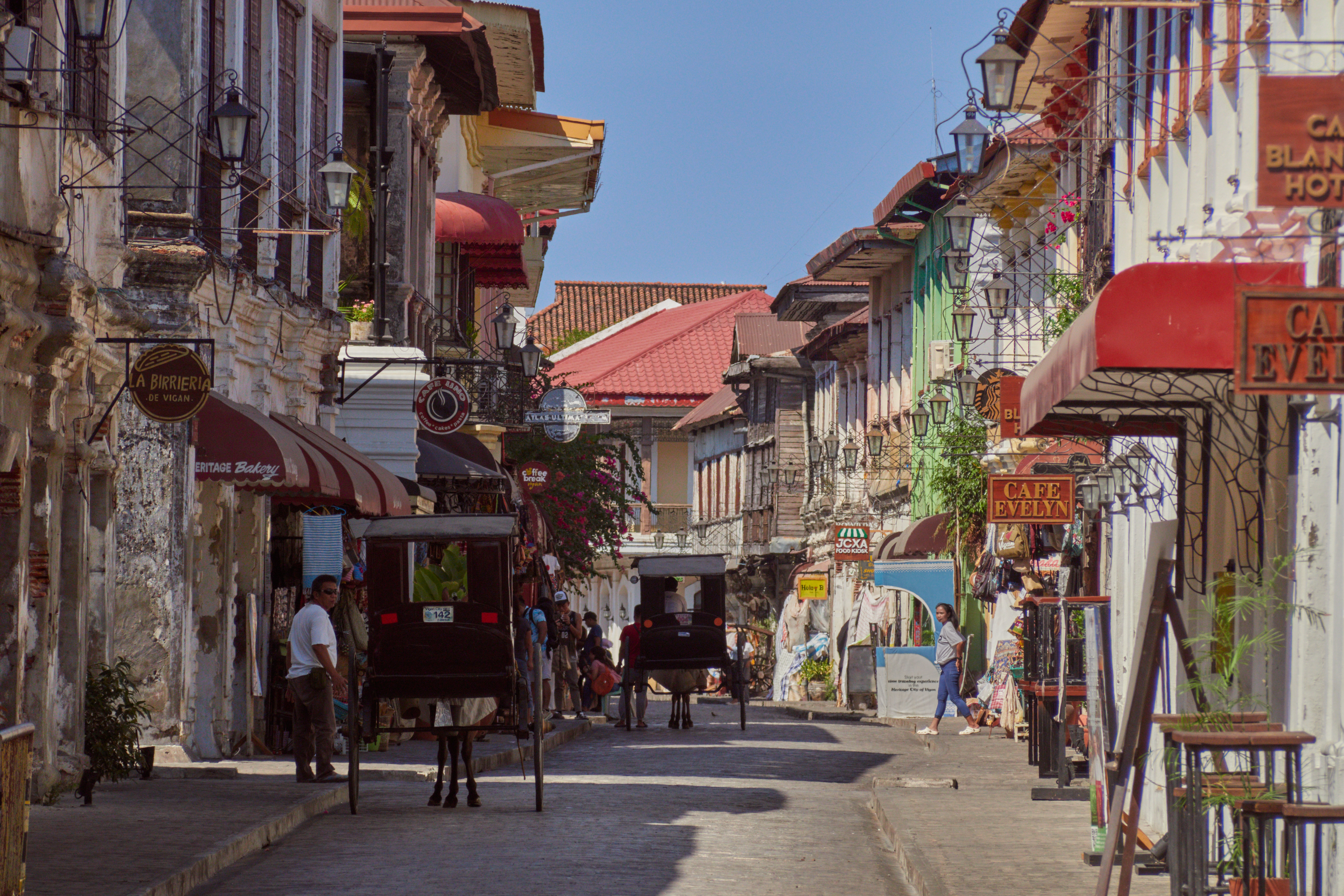
Kalesa (horse-drawn carriages) on Calle Crisologo

The kalesa, a traditional horse-drawn carriage, remains an important part of Vigan's cultural landscape. Kalesas are used for both tourism and local transportation, particularly around the historic district. Kalesa competitions and parades are also held during major city celebrations, helping preserve traditional horsemanship and carriage-making skills while providing a distinctive tourism experience.

=== Heritage conservation and tourism ===
Tourism in Vigan is closely linked to the conservation of its historic environment. Following its inscription on the UNESCO World Heritage List, the city developed a long-term conservation and management program intended to protect the historic urban fabric while supporting the livelihoods of local residents. Vigan's conservation program has included the participation of local communities, heritage-house owners, artisans, educational institutions, and government agencies. Traditional skills such as pottery-making and weaving have been promoted as part of the city's cultural heritage and tourism programs. UNESCO recognized Vigan in 2012 as a model of best practice in World Heritage site management.

The city's approach seeks to balance heritage conservation with economic development by allowing historic buildings and traditional cultural practices to remain part of contemporary urban life. As a result, tourism has become an important component of Vigan's economy while contributing to the preservation of its architectural and cultural heritage.

== Transportation ==
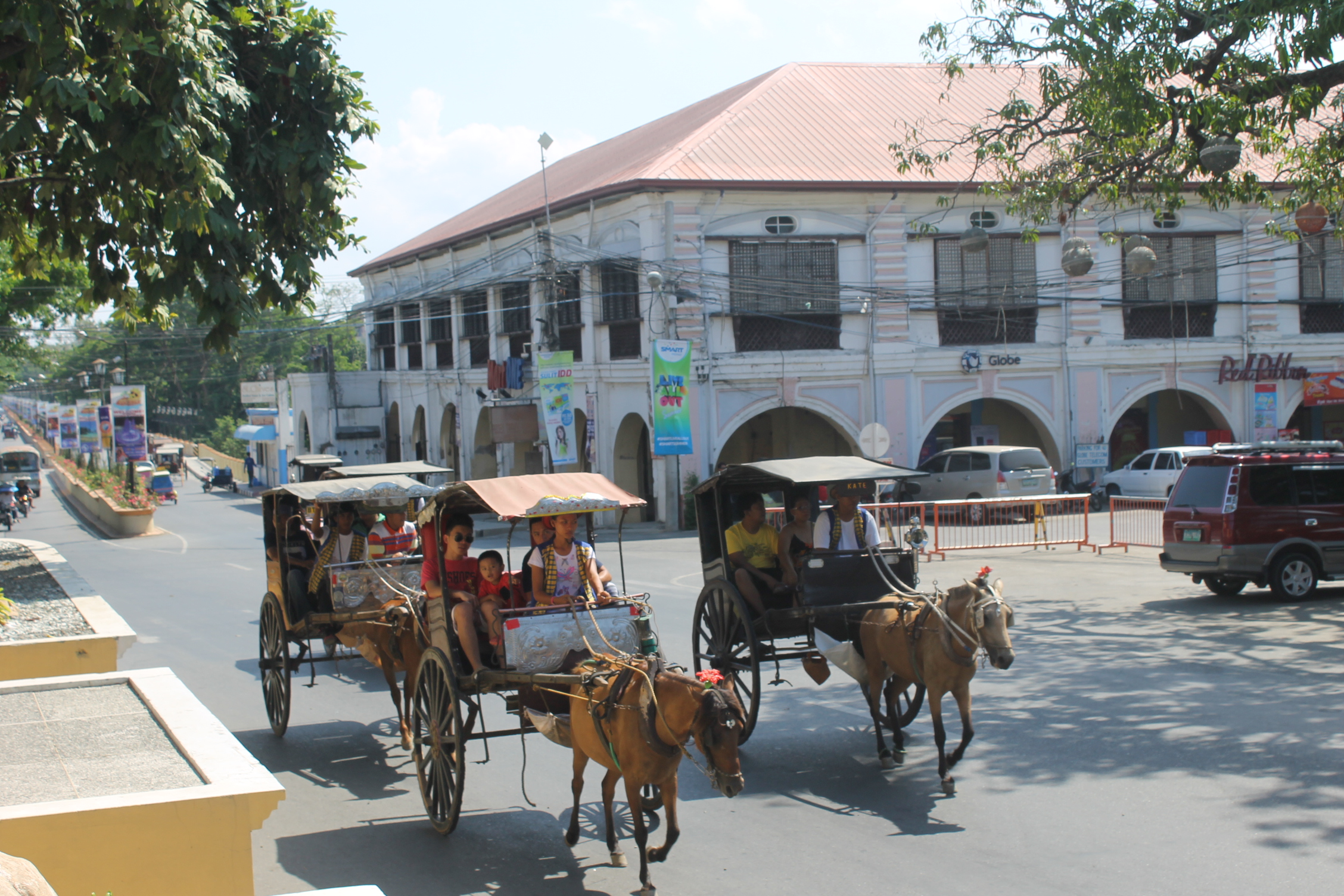
Kalesa, one of the modes of transportation in Vigan

=== Metro transport ===
Modes of transport within the city are purely land-based. Vehicles for public use include jeepneys, tricycles, vans-for-hire (or PUVs/public utility vehicles) and kalesas (horse-drawn vehicles). Buses, mini-buses and jeepneys provide transportation to and from Vigan. The metro Vigan transport system is mostly served by tricycles, which are color- and number-coded to identify their municipality of origin.

=== Land transportation ===
Vigan City is well-served by a network of roads and a major highway that connects to Manila North Road, the highway leading to Manila and the rest of the country. Major bus companies such as Dominion Bus Lines, Viron Transit, Partas, and Aniceto/St. Joseph operate terminals in Vigan. GMW Florida Transport operates a terminal in Bantay, just outside Vigan. Bus companies such as Maria de Leon and Fariñas pass by Vigan on their way to Laoag. They operate direct and/or indirect bus services from Vigan City to points in Luzon, mostly to Manila, Baguio, and Laoag and vice versa. There are also independent bus operators, who recently banded together to form different transport cooperatives, plying the Laoag-Vigan-Carmen and Vigan-Abra routes, and have a joint terminal found at the New Vigan Public Market Annex. A taxi service started operating in 2019, just before the COVID-19 pandemic struck.

=== Air transportation ===
A secondary airport called Vigan Airport (also known as Mindoro Airport) is located at Barangay Mindoro. It has one asphalted runway, 900 meters long and 30 meters wide. The airport was once a dormant asset of the city for it does not generate revenue, with only chartered and private planes using it; it is currently being upgraded and is on its way toward commercialization.

== Healthcare ==
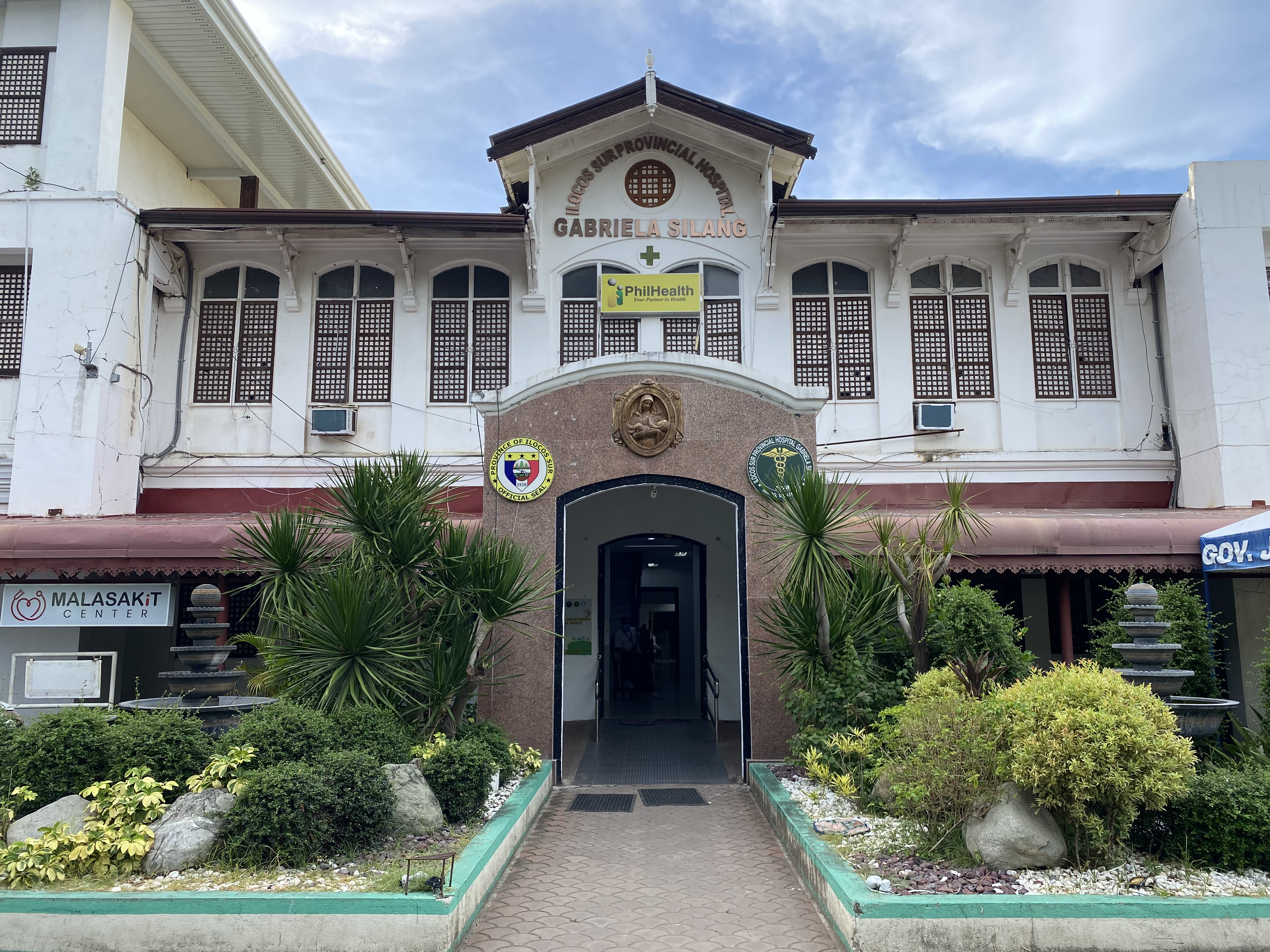
Ilocos Sur Provincial Hospital Gabriela Silang at Barangay Tamag

The city of Vigan is served by a network of public and private healthcare institutions that provide primary to secondary medical services. The primary government-managed hospital in the city is the Ilocos Sur Provincial Hospital Gabriela Silang (ISPH-GS), located in Barangay Tamag. It is an accredited Level 2 General Hospital under the Department of Health (DOH) and serves as the apex referral hospital for the entire province. The provincial hospital offers specialized diagnostic and treatment amenities, including an Oncology Unit, a Mammography Screening Unit, a Clinical Bacteriology Laboratory, and a dedicated Heart Station, as part of its ongoing expansion toward tertiary-level capabilities.

To strengthen decentralized primary health care under the Universal Health Care (UHC) Act, the city government, in cooperation with the Department of Health–Ilocos Region, formally inaugurated the upgraded Vigan City Primary Care Facility on July 18, 2026. Operating under the local Health Facilities Enhancement Program (HFEP), this complex provides comprehensive frontline outpatient care, routine check-ups, diagnostic laboratory exams, maternal and child healthcare, and early disease screening. The Vigan City Health Office is also fully accredited as a PhilHealth Konsulta Package Provider, enabling residents to access free or subsidized essential medicines and medical consultations.

Also located in Barangay Tamag is the University of Northern Philippines Hospital (UNP Hospital), a government-operated medical institution under the city's state university. The UNP Hospital is officially accredited by PhilHealth as a Primary Care Facility, functioning as an essential hub for community health consultations, basic medical care, and as a training laboratory for the university's College of Health Sciences and College of Medicine.

Complementing the state-run medical centers are several private hospitals and specialist clinics distributed across the city and its immediate borders. A major private medical facility serving the population is the Metro Vigan Hospital; although geographically situated along Rizal Avenue in the adjacent municipality of Bantay, it is located immediately adjacent to the Vigan-Bantay boundary and operates as one of the primary healthcare hubs for the entire Metro Vigan area. Other notable private medical facilities within the city limits include Saint James Hospital in Barangay Pantay Daya, Rabara Clinic & Hospital along Rizal Avenue, and the Ilocos Sur Cooperative Medical Mission Group and Hospital (ISCMMGH) in Barangay Tamag.

== Education ==
The Vigan City Schools Division Office oversees the operations of all Schools District Offices within the city. The Division Office is managed by the Department of Education (DepEd). There are two schools district offices (SDOs), namely: Vigan City District I Schools District Office, and Vigan City District II Schools District Office. They govern the operations of all private and public elementary and high schools throughout the city. Technical and vocational schools are governed by TESDA. Tertiary levels are governed by CHED.

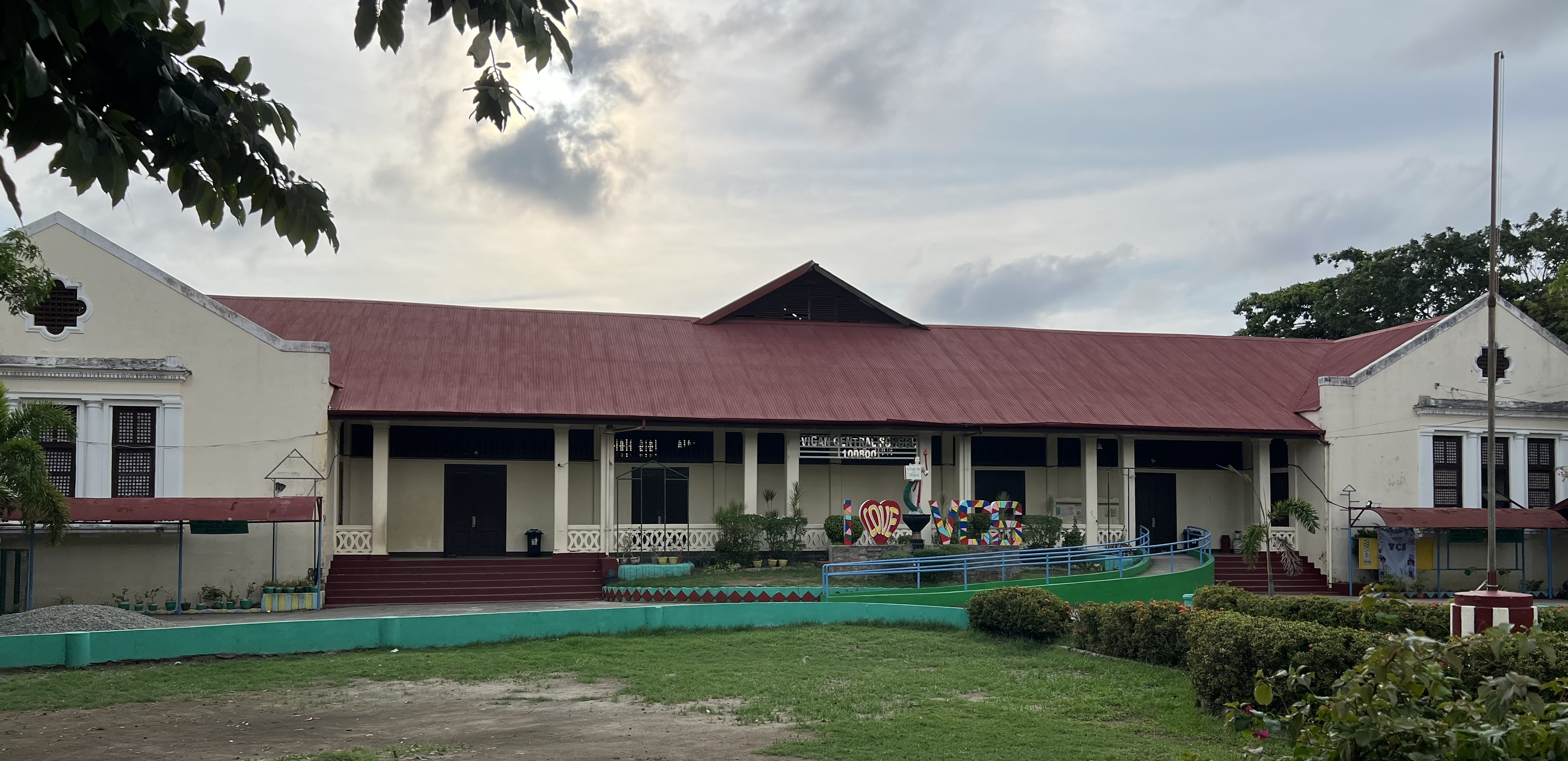
Vigan Central School

Burgos Memorial School East

=== Primary and elementary schools ===
- Adventist School La Ciudad Fernandina
- Ayusan-Paoa Elementary School
- Bulala-Paratong Elementary School
- Burgos Memorial School East
- Burgos Memorial School West
- Cabaroan-Cabalangegan Elementary School
- Calvary Baptist Academy (Elementary)
- Camangaan Elementary School
- Capangpangan Elementary School
- Dudley-S Lara Educational Center for Children
- Gov. Evaristo Singson II Memorial Elementary School
- Jose Singson Elementary School
- Mindoro Elementary School
- Mother Edeltraud Danner School
- Nagsangalan Elementary School
- Pantay Elementary School
- Raois Elementary School
- Rugsuanan-Puroc Elementary School
- Salindeg Elementary School (Salindeg-Pong-ol, Barraca Elementary School)
- San Julian Elementary School
- St. Thomas Aquinas Learning Center
- Tamag Elementary School
- UCCP Christian Learning and Development Center
- Vigan Central School
- Vigan Nan Chong School

=== Secondary schools ===
- Calvary Baptist Academy
- Divine Word College of Vigan - High School Department
- Ilocos Sur National High School (ISNHS) — the major national high school in the province.
- Immaculate Conception Minor Seminary
- Lyceum de Ylocos (Senior High School)
- Marian Institute of Vigan
- University of Northern Philippines - Laboratory High School
- Vigan East National High School
- Vigan West National High School

=== Technical and vocational school ===
- Lyceum de Ylocos — is a new school offering Technical-Vocational courses and is a registered Senior High School offering various Tracks that include ABM, GAS, HUMSS and TLE-Technical-Vocational Courses. Situated at the heart of the Heritage City, 3F Vigan Landmark Building, Barangay VIII. The school adopted a classical name to emphasize the grandeur of its location, the Heritage City of Vigan, the only awardee of the title New World Wonder City in the Philippines. It fosters the promotion of tourism and hospitality; promotes preservation of the cultural heritage and innovates towards service delivery and business processing. Lyceum de Ylocos is committed to be of service to students through the provisions of an environment where there would be opportunities to relate theories and knowledge to practical training.

=== Higher educational institutions ===
- Data Center College of the Philippines of Vigan City, Inc. — Data Center College of the Philippines (DCCPI) first came to Ilocos Sur through a partnership with the University of Northern Philippines for its computerization efforts in the late 80s. It later evolved independently as a college offering computer- and non-computer-related courses. Formerly operating where Lyceum de Ylocos is operating today, they are currently located in a building just outside UNP's Vigan Campus.
- Divine Word College of Vigan (formerly known as the Colegio de la Inmaculada Concepción) — the oldest privately funded school in Ilocos Sur, founded by priests belonging to the Society of the Divine Word (SVD) in 1822.
- Ilocos Sur Community College — a public community college established by the provincial government of Ilocos Sur. It offers affordable tertiary education, mainly focusing on practical and career-oriented programs such as business, education, and technical courses. Its goal is to make college accessible to local residents, especially those with limited financial resources.

Immaculate Conception School of Theology

- Immaculate Conception School of Theology (ICST) — a regional seminary located in Barangay Pantay Daya, serving as the major seminary for the ecclesiastical territories of Northern Luzon. Tracing its roots back to the historic seminary founded in 1822, it operates as a higher education institution offering CHED-recognized graduate programs, including a Master of Arts in Theology and a Master in Pastoral Ministry.
- Macro Colleges — the first computer college in the province, having evolved from being the first shop in Ilocos Sur to offer computer-based services. The school is now K-to-12 College, located at Quezon Avenue. Currently operated by the Nueva Segovia Consortium of Cooperatives.
- STI College (Vigan Campus) — a private higher education institution under the nationwide STI network, offering programs in information technology, computer science, business, hospitality, and multimedia arts. It is recognized for its industry-based curriculum that prepares students for modern, technology-driven careers. The campus is located along Burgos Street, Barangay Pantay Daya, adjacent to St. James Hospital and directly opposite the Immaculate Conception School of Theology.

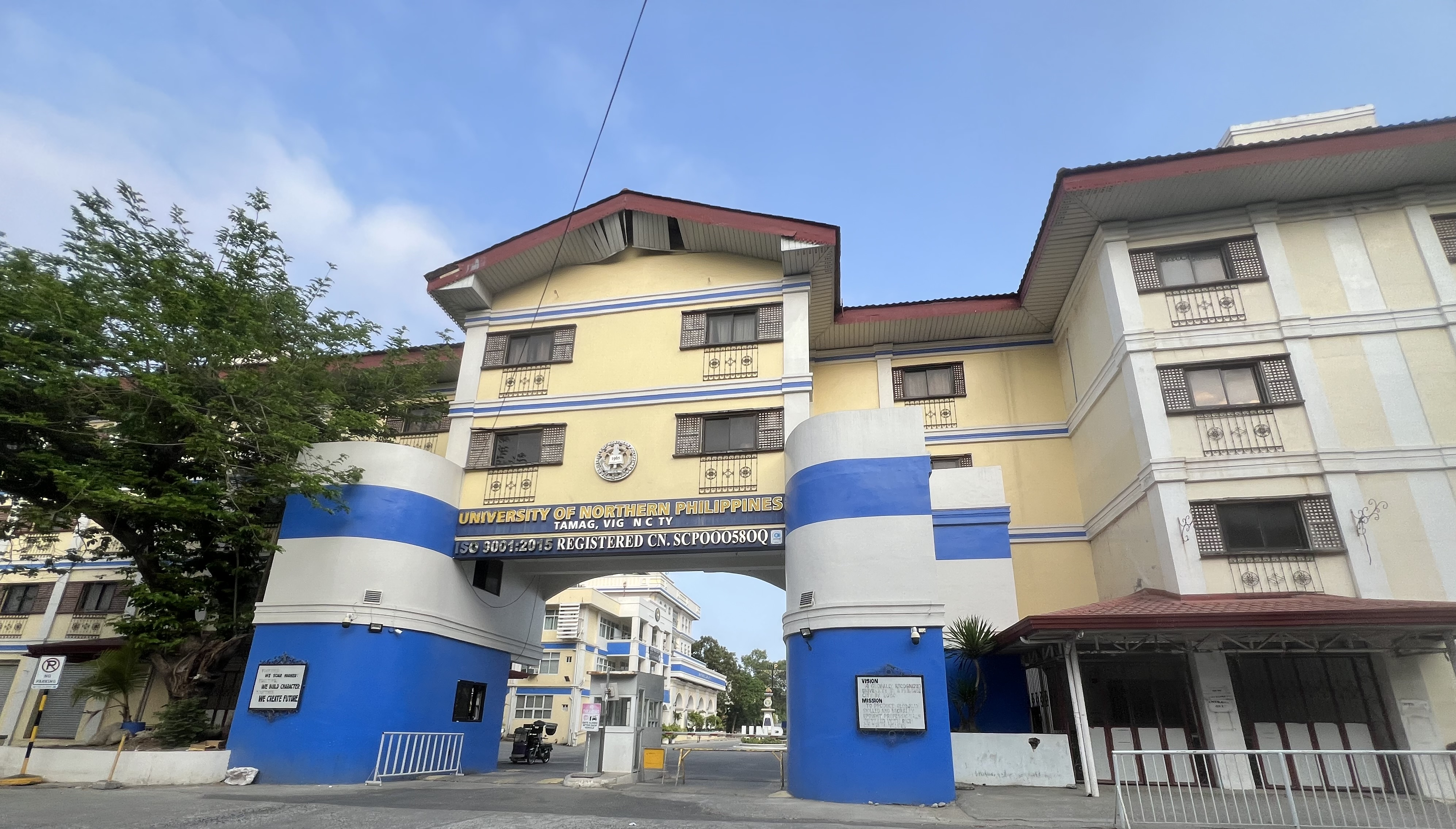
University of Northern Philippines

- University of Northern Philippines Main Campus — in Barangay Tamag. It is the oldest state university in Northern Luzon, founded by virtue of Republic Act 4449, authored by Congressman Floro Crisologo.

== Media ==
=== TV stations ===
- PTV Vigan Channel 4
- ALLTV2 Vigan Channel 11
- GNN Vigan Channel 30
- TV5 Vigan Channel 32
- UNTV Vigan Channel 36
- Sonshine TV Vigan Channel 38
- GTV Vigan Channel 40
- One Sports Vigan Channel 46
- GMA Vigan Channel 48

=== Cable & satellite ===
- Eaglevision Cable
- Vigan Satellite Cable TV
- Cignal TV
- Sky Direct

=== Radio ===
AM stations:

- DZVV Bombo Radyo 603 (Bombo Radyo Philippines)
- DWAE Radyo Pilipinas 747 (Philippine Broadcasting Service)
- DWRS Commando Radio 927 (Solidnorth Broadcasting)
- DZNS 963 Radyo Totoo (Catholic Media Network)

FM stations:

- 88.5 AWR Ilocos Sur (Adventist Media)
- 91.7 Brigada News FM (Brigada Mass Media Corporation)
- 94.1 Magik FM (Century Broadcasting Network)
- 98.9 XFM Vigan (Southern Broadcasting Network/Y2H Broadcasting Network, Inc.)
- 99.7 Core FM (Iddes Broadcast Group)
- 100.5 Campus Radio (University of Northern Philippines)
- 105.3 iFM Vigan (Radio Mindanao Network)

== Sister cities ==
| Local | International |
|---|---|
| (Philippines) Angeles City, Pampanga; (Philippines) Cotabato City, Maguindanao Del Norte; (Philippines) Laoag, Ilocos Norte; (Philippines) Makati, Metro Manila; (Philippines) Naga, Camarines Sur; (Philippines) Taguig, Metro Manila | Agadir, Morocco; Funchal, Portugal; Honolulu, United States; Malacca City, Malaysia; Mar Del Plata, Argentina |

== Notable individuals ==
- Pedro Bucaneg (1592-1630), Ilocano writer and traditionally recognized as the Father of Ilocano literature.
- José Burgos (1837-1872), Gomburza martyr, priest and reform advocate.
- Marcelino Crisólogo (1844-1927), politician, poet, writer and playwright. Calle Crisologo or Mena Crisologo Street was named after him.
- Leona Florentino (1849-1884), a Filipina foundational poet, dramatist, satirist, and playwright who is also known as the Mother of Philippine Women's Literature and honored in France, Spain, and the United States.
- Isabelo de los Reyes (1864-1938), patriot, politician, writer, journalist, and labor activist.
- Aquilino Calvo (1871-1932), senator and former governors of Pangasinan and Mountain Province; born in Vigan.
- Joaquín Xaudaró (1872–1933), Spanish cartoonist, illustrator, and filmmaker who was born in Vigan.
- Alfredo Verzosa (1877–1954), Roman Catholic bishop, the first Ilocano bishop and the first Filipino bishop from Northern Luzon; co-founder of the Missionary Catechists of the Sacred Heart (MCSH) and a Servant of God.
- Vicente Singson Encarnacion (1875-1961), lawyer, politician, and businessman.
- Elpidio Quirino (1890-1956), senator, vice president, and 6th President of the Philippines.
- Leon C. Pichay (1902-1970), writer and cultural figure.
- Jose L. de Ocampo (1906-1995), Filipino architect and artist.
- Floro Crisologo (1908-1970), lawyer, congressman and World War II veteran.
- Peter Aduja (1920-2007), Filipino-American politician, judge, teacher, and World War II veteran; he became the first Filipino-American elected to public office in the United States.
- Rafael S. Donato (1937–2006), Lasallian Brother and academic who served as president of De La Salle University and other Lasallian institutions.
- Romeo Munoz Cachola (born 1938), Filipino-American politician who served in the Hawaii House of Representatives and on the Honolulu City Council.
- Chavit Singson (born 1941), politician and businessman.
- Romeo P. Ariniego (1943–2023), physician, cardiologist, and medical educator who grew up in Vigan City.
- Vincent Crisologo (born 1947), politician and former Quezon City representative; born in Vigan.
- Rogelio Singson (born 1948), industrial engineer, businessman, and public servant; former Secretary of Public Works and Highways (2010–2016) under President Benigno Aquino III.
- Freddie Aguilar (1953-2025), Filipino singer-songwriter; his mother, Salud Pascual, was a native of Vigan.
- Deogracias Victor B. Savellano (1959-2025), former governor, former Vice Governor, former House of Representatives Undersecretary for Livestock at the Department of Agriculture and former mayor of Cabugao
- Rita Avila (born 1964), actress and writer; her maternal ancestry includes a family from Vigan.
- Christopher Cabaldon (born 1965), Filipino-American politician and educator; California state senator and former mayor of West Sacramento; traces his Filipino roots to Vigan.
