= List of historical markers of the Philippines in the Ilocos Region =

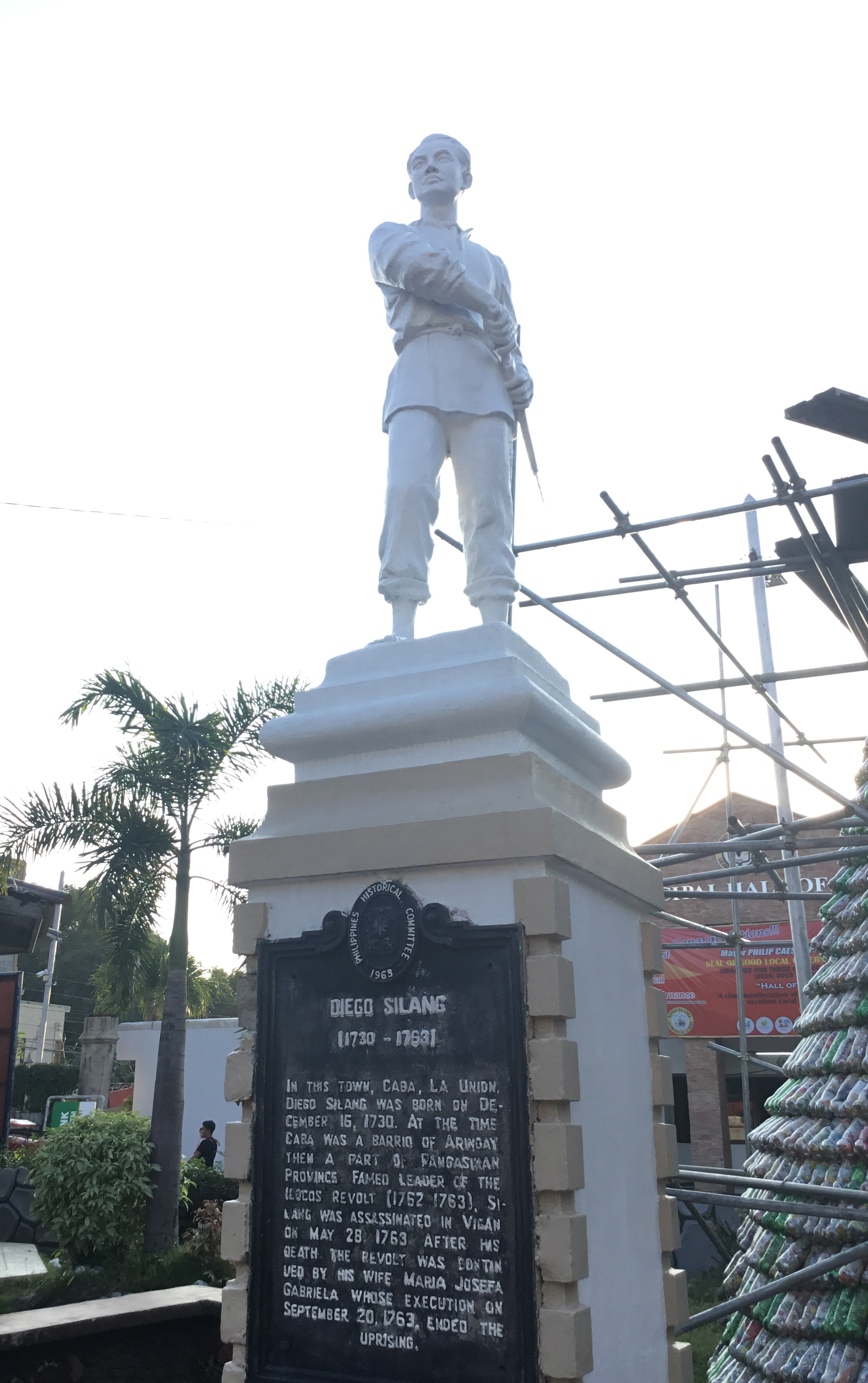
Diego Silang monument and historical marker, Caba, La Union

This list of historical markers installed by the National Historical Commission of the Philippines (NHCP) in Ilocos Region is an annotated list of people, places, or events in the region that have been commemorated by cast-iron plaques issued by the said commission. The plaques themselves are permanent signs installed in publicly visible locations on buildings, monuments, or in special locations.

While many Cultural Properties have historical markers installed, not all places marked with historical markers are designated into one of the particular categories of Cultural Properties.

Delayed negotiations with the family that owns Casa Hacienda prompted the local government of Bautista to install the marker where Filipinas/Lupang Hinirang was composed to the town's plaza instead.

The historical marker commemorating the centennial birth anniversary of the late dictator and president Ferdinand Marcos in Batac, Ilocos Norte, unveiled on September 11, 2017, became controversial, as the NHCP earlier opposed the late strongman's burial at the Libingan ng mga Bayani. Baybayin, an Ateneo de Manila student organization, issued an alternative marker online containing atrocities under the Marcos regime, as well as his burial. The said online marker became a statement against historical distortion.

This article lists 128 markers from the Ilocos Region, including 20 that are part of the Philippine Nationhood Trail markers series.

== Ilocos Norte ==
This table lists 40 markers from the Province of Ilocos Norte.

Marker title	Description	Location	Language	Date issued	Image
Abolition of Tobacco Monopoly	Established in March 1782. Brought both prosperity and abuse, abolished in 1882.	Laoag Plaza, Laoag City	English	1958	
Anastacia Giron Tupas	Distinguished Filipina nurse. Considered the "Philippine dean of nursing."	Regional Health Center, Tupaz St., Laoag City	Filipino	December 18, 1985	
Antonio Luna; 1866–1899	Delegate of the Malolos Convention and Commander-in-Chief during the Filipino-American War.	Juan Luna Shrine, Badoc	Filipino	October 29, 2016	
Artemio Ricarte (1866–1945)	Known as Vibora. Filipino general who was deported to Guam by the Americans.	Batac	Filipino	March 22, 1993	
Artemio Ricarte Vibora	Dedication to the centenary of his appointment as first Chief of Staff of the Armed Forces of the Philippines.	Batac	English	March 24, 1997	
Bahay ni Luna (Note: House of Luna)	Declared as a national historical landmark by the NHCP.	Luna Shrine, Badoc	Filipino	September 11, 1977	
Bahay Pamahalaan ng San Nicolas (Note: Government House of San Nicolas)	Municipal hall that became a Japanese garrison during WWII. Renovated from 2004 to 2009.	San Nicolas Municipal Hall, San Nicolas	Filipino	December 30, 2009	
Bayan ng Solsona (Note: Town of Solsona)		Solsona		January 29, 2010	
Birthplace of Gregorio Aglipay	Site where Gregorio Aglipay, the founder of the Philippine Independent Church, was born.	Batac	English	1949	
Birthplace of Juan Luna y Novicio	The birthplace of painter and patriot Juan Luna who was born here on October 24, 1857.	Badoc	Filipino, English	1957, 1977	
Birthplace of Valentin Diaz	Birthplace of a La Liga Filipina member and the treasurer of the Katipunan.	Paoay	English	1951	
Catholic Church of Sarrat	Formerly named Church of San Miguel in commemoration of the arrival at Sarrat of the first missionaries on the feast of San Miguel on 29 September 1727.	Sarrat Church, Sarrat	English	1959	
Church of Laoag	Founded in 1580 by Augustinian friars, with the first chapel built out of wood and thatch.	Laoag Church, Laoag City	English	1950	
Church of Paoay	Founded in 1593 by Augustinian missionaries. Belltower served as lookout by the Katipuneros during the Philippine Revolution and the guerillas during the WWII.	Paoay Church, Paoay	English	May 2, 1980	
Church of San Nicolas	Founded in 1584 by Augustinian missionaries. Occupied by the Philippine Independent Church from 1900 to 1901.	San Nicolas Church, San Nicolas	English	1952	
Claro Caluya	Ilocano poet and dramatist. Founded civic and cultural organizations.	Piddig	English	May 6, 1975	
Don Mariano Marcos y Rubio (1897–1945)	Became the representative for the Second District of Ilocos Norte	Don Mariano Marcos State University, Batac	Filipino	October 24, 1983	
Enriqueta de Peralta	Ilocanda poet and local leader. One of the leaders of the women suffrage in the Philippines.	Dingras	Filipino	January 14, 1989	
Ferdinand Marcos; 1917–1989	President of the Philippines from 1965 to 1986. Subjected the country under Martial Law from 1972 to 1981.	Batac Plaza, Batac	Filipino	September 10, 2017	
General Artemio Ricarte (Vibora)	Filipino general during the Philippine Revolution and the Philippine–American War.	Batac	English	1966	
Gregoria M. Rivera de Quirino Memorial Hospital		Dingras		March 19, 1987	
Guho ng Simbahang Katoliko ng Dingras (Note: Ruins of the Catholic Church of Dingras)	One of the biggest church ruins in the Philippines, resulted from the earthquake and fires of 1913.	Dingras	Filipino	March 19, 1987	
Josefa Llanes Escoda	Founder of the Philippine Girl Scouts movement.	Dingras			
Heneral Fidel V. Segundo (Note: General Fidel V. Segundo)	A Filipino general who was one of those tortured by the Japanese.	Laoag City	Filipino	December 1969	
Juan Luna	Esteemed painter, born on October 24, 1857.	Juan Luna Shrine, Badoc	Filipino	October 24, 2017	
Juan Luna y Novicio	Foremost Filipino painter and a contemporary of José Rizal. Won gold medal for his Spoliarium.	Badoc	English	1957	
Kapitolyo ng Lalawigan ng Ilocos Norte (Note: Capitol of the Province of Ilocos Norte)	Built from 1917 to 1925 under the designs of Ralph Harrington Doane. Governor Roque Ablan deserted the building when the Japanese arrived.	Ilocos Norte Capitol, Laoag City	Filipino	March 1, 2018	
Kul-labeng Historical Site; Pinili, Ilocos Norte	Site where Gregorio Aglipay and his colleagues made the decision to separate from the authority of Spanish friars of the Roman Catholic Church in the Philippines on May 8, 1902.	Pinili	English	November 7, 1998	
Pag-aalsang Basi (Note: Basi Revolt)	Spanish monopoly towards basi led to societal damage that triggered a local revolt in Ilocos.	Piddig	Filipino	September 16, 2026	
Ang Parola ng Cape Bojeador (Note: The Cape Bojeador Lighthouse)	Design by the engineer Magin Pers y Pers, 1987. Designated as a national cultural treasure.	Cape Bojeador Lighthouse, Burgos	Filipino	September 19, 2007	
Ang Pinagdaungan ng USS Stingray (Note: The landing site of USS Stingray)	Where the USS Stingray landed on a mission to find Gov. Roque Ablan to strengthen the fight against the Japanese during WWII.	Caunayan Landing Site Memorial, Sito Bimmanaaw, Caunayan Bay, Pagudpud	Filipino	1994; April 24, 2018 (replacement)	
Roque Ablan	Newspaperman, lawyer, labor leader. Governor of Ilocos Norte during the outbreak of WWII.	Laoag City	English	1951	
Roque B. Ablan	World War II hero, established the Ablan-Madamba guerilla group.	Laoag City	Filipino	August 9, 2006	
Santiago A. Fonacier y Suguitan	One of the founders of iglesia Filipina Independiente. Translated Noli me Tángere and El filibusterismo into Iloko.	Laoag City	Filipino	May 21, 1985	
Servando Castro	One of those who signed the Doctrina y Reglas Constitucionales. Representative of Ilocos Norte to the 1934 Constitutional Convention.	Sabas St. cor. Asuncion St., Batac	Filipino	December 6, 1983	
Ang Simbahan ng Badoc (Note: The Church of Badoc)	Founded in 1591 by Augustinian friars. Became a parish by 1714.	Badoc Church, Badoc	Filipino	May 2, 1980	
Simbahan ng Piddig (Note: Church of Piddig)	Became a temporary fort of the Filipino troops during the Philippine-American War.	Church of Piddig façade, Piddig	Filipino	July 25, 2019	
Tahanan ng Angkang Puruganan (Note: House of Puruganan Clan)	Meeting place of Gregorio Puruganan and Gregorio Aglipay, where they were also captured by the Americans.	Dingras	Filipino	March 19, 1987	
Teofilo Yldefonso (1903–1942)	Swimmer and soldier, known as the “Ilocano Shark”	Piddig	Filipino	September 21, 2009	
Tomas S. Fonacier	First dean of U.P. Iloilo. Became chairman of Institute of Asian Studies.	Laoag City	Filipino	July 5, 1982	

== Ilocos Sur ==
This table lists 40 markers from the province of Ilocos Sur.

Marker title	Description	Location	Language	Date issued	Image
The Base Hospital, USAFIP, NL	Where the base hospital was transferred, the biggest hospital installation in the Philippines during WWII.	Tagudin	English	1958	
The Battle and Liberation of Cervantes	Mountain rangers were guerrilla hotspots during WWII. Was an important communication routes of the Japanese forces.	Del Pilar	English	1959	
The Battle and Liberation of Suyo	Battle began on the morning of February 1, 1945. Became important to the Japanese as Suyo was the main copper mine of Lepanto.	Suyo	English	1959	
The Battle of Bessang Pass	Commemorating the battle that hastened the surrender of the Japanese imperial forces under General Tomotuki Yamashita.	Cervantes	English	1954	
Birthplace of Father Burgos	Commemorating the birthplace of one of the martyr priests of GomBurZa.	Burgos Ancestral House, Vigan City	English	1939	
The Bitalag Road Junction	Served as an important Japanese outpost. Became an initial action for the Battle of Bessang Pass.	Bitalag, Tagudin	English	1959	
Candon; Landas ng Pagkabansang Pilipino, 1899 (Note: Candon: Philippine Nationhood Trail, 1899)	Where Aguinaldo passed from November 21-22, 1899.	Candon Town Plaza	Filipino	November 22, 2024	
Cathedral of Vigan	Built in 1641, became the seat of the Diocese of Nueva Segovia.	Vigan Cathedral, Vigan City	English	1949	
Church of Narvacan	Constructed by the Augustinians in 1587. Early church destroyed by fire in 1611.	Narvacan	English	1950	
Clemente Udarbe y Ulibas	Patriot and Katipunero. Headed the Katipunan branch from 1895 to 1898.	Magsingal	Filipino	December 10, 2004	
Elpidio R. Quirino	Native of Vigan who became President of the Philippines from 1948 to 1956.	Plaza Salcedo, Vigan City	English	November 16, 2010	
Gregoria M. Rivera de Quirino Memorial Hospital	Established 1950–1951. Dedicated to the mother of President Elpidio Quirino.	Vigan City	English	1949	
Gregoria M. Rivera Memorial Library	First constructed as municipal jail in 1657. Birthplace of President Quirino.	Vigan Provincial Jail (now National Museum Vigan branch), Vigan City	English	1949	
Gregorio del Pilar (1875–1899)	Revolutionary general born in Bulacan. Fought against the Americans at the Battle of Tirad Pass where he was killed.	Candon Bypass Road, Candon	Filipino	March 25, 2026	
Isabelo F. de los Reyes (1864–1938)			English	1939	
Isabelo F. de los Reyes (1864–1938)	Established the Union Obrera Democratica de Filipinas, the first labor movement in the Philippines.	Florentino Ancestral House (Cafe Leona), Calle Crisologo, Vigan City	Filipino	May 1, 2003	
Isabelo Abaya; 1866–1900	Revolutionary hero of Candon for both the Philippine Revolution and the Philippine-American War.	Isabelo Abaya Monument, Candon Plaza, Candon	Filipino	March 29, 2016	
Battle of Tirad Pass	Where Gregorio H. del pilar tried to halt American advance to capture Aguinaldo.	Tirad Pass, Cervantes	Filipino, English	1952	
Leona Florentino	Foremost Ilocano poet, subtle satirist, and playwright. Mother of Isabelo de los Reyes.	Florentino Ancestral House (Cafe Leona), 1 Calle Crisologo, Vigan City	Filipino	April 19, 1959	
Leon C. Pichay	Writer and poet from Vigan and associate writer of the Ilocano Times.	Burgos St., Vigan City	Filipino	July 5, 1983	
Mansion Syquia	Syquia heritage house, constructed in 1830. Declared as a heritage house.	Syquia Ancestral House, Vigan City	English, Spanish	1950 (English marker), 1951 (Spanish marker)	
Maria Josefa Gabriela Silang (1723–1763)	First woman in the Philippines to lead a revolt. Assumed leadership of Diego Silang's revolt after his assassination.	Santa	English	1963	
Maria Josefa Gabriela Silang (1723–1763)	First woman in the Philippines to lead a revolt. Assumed leadership of Diego Silang's revolt after his assassination.	Ilocos Sur Capitol, Vigan	English	1963	
Memorare	Where Gen. Gregorio del Pilar was shot and killed by the Americans.	Cervantes	Filipino	December 2, 1999	
Memorare	Commemorating the Battle of Tirad Pass.	Del Pilar	Filipino	2000	
Mena Crisologo	One of those that signed the Malolos Constitution, became the first governor of Ilocos Sur in 1901.	Burgos St., Vigan City	Filipino	July 5, 1983	
Pasong Diego–Gabriela Silang (Note: Diego–Gabriela Silang Pass)	Used by the revolts of Andres Malong and Diego and Gabriela Silang. Built by the Franciscans in 1600. Formerly known as Pideg.	Santa	Filipino	1976	
Pedro Bukaneg		Bantay			
Pedro Bukaneg	Father of Ilocano literature and translator of Latin and Spanish works into Ilocano.	Burgos St., Vigan City	Filipino	July 5, 1983	
San Esteban Landing	Landing of the USS Gar on November 23, 1944, within Santiago Cove.	San Esteban	English	1982; washed away by a typhoon in 2001, replaced after	
Salcedo; Landas ng Pagkabansang Pilipino, 1899 (Note: Salcedo: Philippine Nationhood Trail, 1899)	Where Aguinaldo passed on November 22, 1899.	Salcedo Plaza, Salcedo	Filipino	March 17, 2025	
Sevilla; Landas ng Pagkabansang Pilipino, 1899 (Note: Sevilla: Philippine Nationhood Trail, 1899)	Where Aguinaldo passed on November 21, 1899.	Sevilla, Santa Cruz	Filipino	November 26, 2024	
Santa Cruz; Landas ng Pagkabansang Pilipino, 1899 (Note: Santa Cruz: Philippine Nationhood Trail, 1899)	Where Aguinaldo passed on November 21, 1899.	People's Park, Santa Cruz	Filipino	November 26, 2024	
Santa Lucia; Landas ng Pagkabansang Pilipino, 1899 (Note: Santa Lucia: Landas ng Pagkabansang Pilipino, 1899)	Where Aguinaldo passed on November 21, 1899.	Santa Lucia	Filipino	December 9, 2025	
Simbahan ng Candon (Note: Church of Candon)	Established by Augustinians in 1591. Structure first built in 1695.	Candon Plaza, Candon	Filipino	March 29, 2016	
Simbahan ng Sta. Maria (Note: Church of Sta. Maria)	Originally built by Augustinians as the Chapel of Narvacan. Became a parish in 1769.	Sta. Maria	Filipino	September 26, 1982	
Simbahan ng Sta. Maria (Note: Church of Sta. Maria)	Church declared by the NHCP as a National Historical Landmark.	Sta. Maria	Filipino	1970s	
Sigaw ng Candon (Note: Cry of Candon)	Katipunan victory over the Spaniards in Candon under the leadership of Isabelo Abaya.	Candon Plaza, Candon	Filipino	March 29, 2016	
Site of the Diocese of Nueva Segovia	Founded in Lal-lo, Cagayan on August 14, 1595, moved to Vigan in 1758.	Archbishop Palace of Nueva Segovia (Arzobispado), Vigan City	English	1949	
Syquia Mansion	Declared as a heritage house by the NHCP.	Syquia Ancestral House, Vigan City	English	February 2, 2002	

== La Union ==
This table lists 22 markers from the Province of La Union.

Marker title	Description	Location	Language	Date issued	Image
Aringay; Landas ng Pagkabansang Pilipino, 1899 (Note: Aringay: Philippine Nationhood Trail, 1899)	Aguinaldo encouraged Ilocanos to continue fighting.	Don Agaton Yaranon Memorial Park, Aringay	Filipino	November 25, 2024	
Bacsil Ridge	Taken over by liberation forces on March 21, 1945. San Fernando City was liberated three days later.	Ortega Highway, San Fernando City	English	1958	
Bacnotan; Landas ng Pagkabansang Pilipino, 1899 (Note: Bacnotan: Philippine Nationhood Trail, 1899)	Aguinaldo and his troops stayed here.	Bacnotan Town Plaza	Filipino	October 15, 2025	
Balaoan; Landas ng Pagkabansang Pilipino, 1899 (Note: Balaoan: Philippine Nationhood Trail, 1899)	Aguinaldo and his troops stayed here.	Balaoan	Filipino	January 31, 2025	
Bangar; Landas ng Pagkabansang Pilipino, 1899 (Note: Bacnotan: Philippine Nationhood Trail, 1899)	Aguinaldo and his troops stayed here.	Bacnotan Town Plaza	Filipino	October 15, 2025	
Bauang Baluarte (Note: Bauang Watchtower)	Erected in 1836 to guard against piracy.	Bauang	English		
Bauang; Landas ng Pagkabansang Pilipino, 1899 (Note: Bauang: Philippine Nationhood Trail, 1899)	Where Aguinaldo passed on November 17, 1899.	Bauang	Filipino	March 19, 2025	
Basilica of Our Lady of Charity	Parish church of La Union's oldest town. Founded in 1578 by Franciscans Frs. Juan Bautista Lucarelli and Sebastian de Baeza.	Agoo Basilica, Agoo	English	1982	
The Battle of San Fernando	Crucial battle of allied forces against the Japanese. Battle began on January 4, 1945.	San Fernando Plaza, San Fernando City	English	1959	
Caba	Established on June 24, 1598, under Augustinians. Town where Diego Silang was born.	Caba Town Plaza, Caba	Filipino	June 24, 1979	
Caba; Landas ng Pagkabansang Pilipino, 1899 (Note: Caba Philippine Nationhood Trail, 1899)	Aguinaldo passed by here, November 17, 1899.	Caba Public Plaza	Filipino	November 25, 2024	
Camilo Osías	Writer, editor, and statistician. President of National University from 1921 to 1934.	Balaoan	Filipino	March 17, 1898	
Camp Spencer	Named on honor of Private Grafton Spencer, AUS. Darigayos Cove was a scene of American submarine landings during WWII.	Darigayos, Luna	English	1958	
Church of San Fernando, La Union	Chapel made of stone and thatch erected 1764. Moved to present site by 1773.	San Fernando City	English	1949	
Diego Silang (1730–1763)	Born in this town on December 16, 1730, started a revolt against the Spaniards.	Diego Silang Monument, Caba Town Plaza, Caba	English	1963	
Elpidio Quirino (1890–1958)	Former president of the Philippines. First worked as a teacher in the barrio of Capari-an.	MacArthur Highway, Caba	Filipino	November 16, 1983	
Manuel E. Arguilla; 1911–1944	Multi-awarded writer and poet during the Commonwealth era. Born on June 17, 1911.	Arguilla Ancestral House, Nabrebcan, Bauang	Filipino	August 25, 1983	
Ang Parola ng Poro Point (Note: The Poro Point Lighthouse)	First built in 1885.	San Fernando City	Filipino	January 28, 2008	
Pitugan	Where Manuel Roxas while escaping from the Japanese contacted the American Liberation Forces.	Pitugan, Tubao	Filipino	1958	
Rosario; Landas ng Pagkabansang Pilipino, 1899 (Note: Rosario Philippine Nationhood Trail, 1899)	Aguinaldo and his troops passed by here. General Manuel Tinio reported the incoming American troops.	Rosario	Filipino	January 31, 2025	
San Fernando; Landas ng Pagkabansang Pilipino, 1899 (Note: San Fernando: Philippine Nationhood Trail, 1899)	Aguinaldo passed by here, November 19, 1899.	San Fernando City Plaza	Filipino	December 2, 2024	
Tubao; Landas ng Pagkabansang Pilipino, 1899 (Note: Tubao: Philippine Nationhood Trail, 1899)	Where Aguinaldo passed on November 16-17, 1899.	Tubao Municipal Plaza, Tubao	Filipino	March 18, 2025	

== Pangasinan ==
This table lists 26 markers from the province of Pangasinan.

Marker title	Description	Location	Language	Date issued	Image
Alava; Landas ng Pagkabansang Pilipino, 1899 (Note: Alava: Philippine Nationhood Trail, 1899)	Aguinaldo and his troops passed by here.	Sison	Filipino	January 30, 2025	
Bani	Formerly founded as a visita of Bolinao on March 6, 1979. The town had 13 martyrs during the Spanish regime.	Bani	Filipino	March 17, 1979	
Bayambang; Landas ng Pagkabansang Pilipino, 1899 (Note: Bayambang: Philippine Nationhood Trail, 1899)	Where Aguinaldo decided to fight the Americans using guerilla tactics.	Bayambang Municipal Hall	Filipino	November 13, 2024	
Calasiao; Landas ng Pagkabansang Pilipino, 1899 (Note: Calasiao: Philippine Nationhood Trail, 1899)	Aguinaldo stayed at the Church of Calasiao on November 14, 1899.	Calasiao Municipal Hall	Filipino	November 14, 2024	
Casa Real ng Lingayen (Note: Casa Real of Lingayen)	Served as the capitol of Pangasinan until 1918.	Lingayen	Filipino	June 21, 2021	
Church of Dagupan	Established by the Augustinian friars. Damaged because of the revolt by Andres Malong.	At the façade of the old St. John Cathedral, Dagupan	English	1939	
Church of Nuestra Señora de Manaoag	Admiministered by the Dominicans since 1605. Our Lady of Manaoag crowned on Aorul 21, 1926.	Manaoag Church façade, Manaoag	English	1937	
Colegio de San Alberto Magno	Site of the school constructed by the Dominicans in 1892. Closed because of the damages from the earthquake of 1935.	Dagupan (currently in NHCP storage)	English	1939	
Daniel Maramba	Became part of the Katipunan, governor of Pangasinan, and senator.	Sta. Barbara	Filipino	July 24, 1970	
Eugenio Perez y Padlan (1896–1957)	Known lawyer and statesman. Co-founder of the Liberal Party. Became the first speaker of the First Congress of the Philippines.	Obong-Patacbo Barangay Road, Barrio Basista, San Carlos City	Filipino	November 13, 1996	
Geronima T. Pecson (1896–1989)	Educator and social worker, first female senator.	Libsong Elementary School, Lingayen	Filipino	1997	
Juan Cabreros Laya	Writer and educator. Served as branch director of the schools in Bataan.	Juan C. Laya High School, San Manuel	Filipino	July 12, 1982	
Lingayen Beach	Where General Lloyd Wheaton landed his troops on November 7, 1899, to cut off the retreat of General Emilio Aguinaldo.	Lingayen Beach, Pangasinan Provincial Capitol Grounds, Lingayen	English	1948	
Luklukan ng Pamahalaang Panghimagsikan ng Pilipinas; Bayambang Pangasinan (Note: Seat of the Revolutionary Government of the Philippines: Bayambang, Pangasinan)	Became center of the government by Aguinaldo on November 12, 1899	Bayambang Municipal Hall, Bayambang (current location unknown)	Filipino	November 12, 1999	
Lunsod ng San Carlos (Note: City of San Carlos)	First town in Pangasinan; named after King Charles of Spain.	Parish Church, St. Dominic Plaza, San Carlos City	Filipino	September 25, 1988	
Luzon Landing	Site where General McArthur returned to the Philippines to liberate the commonwealth from the Japanese.	Blue Beach Site, Ceralde St., Bonuan Gueset, Dagupan	English	1949, 1961	
Manaoag; Landas ng Pagkabansang Pilipino, 1899 (Note: Manaoag: Philippine Nationhood Trail, 1899)	Aguinaldo stayed in the forests of Manaoag, November 14, 1899	Manaoag Municipal Hall, Manaoag	Tagalog	November 13, 2024	
Paaralang Sentral ng Lingayen I (Note: Lingayen Central School I)	Was spared from the bombings of the forces of Gen. Douglas MacArthur. Where Fidel Ramos spent his elementary schooling.	Lingayen	Filipino	August 22, 1992	
Ang Paglunsad (1945) (Note: The Landing (1945))	Where Carlos P. Romulo landed in Lingayen in a mission, under McArthur, to liberate the Philippines.	Lingayen Beach, Pangasinan Provincial Capitol Grounds, Lingayen	Filipino		
Pook Kung Saan Sinulat ang "Filipinas", Liriko ng Pambansang Awit; Bautista, Pangasinan (Note: Site where "Filipinas", the lyrics of the National Anthem, were written)	Where the lyrics of the national anthem were written.	Town Plaza, Bautista	Filipino	December 11, 2017	
Pozzorubio; Landas ng Pagkabansang Pilipino, 1899 (Note: Pozzorubio: Philippine Nationhood Trail, 1899)	Aguinaldo temporary rested in the town church.	Pozzorubio Town Plaza	Filipino	November 26, 2024	
Ramos House; Lingayen, Pangasinan	Site of ancestral house of the Ramoses, including Fidel Ramos and Leticia Ramos Shahani.	Presidential Hotel, Lingayen	Filipino, English	August 22, 1993	
Ramos House; Lingayen, Pangasinan	Site of ancestral house of the Ramoses. House destroyed during WWII, reconstructed in 1995.	Ramos Ancestral House, Lingayen	English	1995	
San Manuel; Landas ng Pagkabansang Pilipino, 1899 (Note: San Manuel: Philippine Nationhood Trail, 1899)	Aguinaldo and his troops passed by here.	Doña Carmen's Park	Filipino	November 14, 2024	
Santa Barbara: Landas ng Pagkabansang Pilipino, 1899 (Note: Santa Barbara: Philippine Nationhood Trail, 1899)	Where Aguinaldo merged his troops with the ones under Lt. Joven and Gen. del Pilar.	Santa Barbara Town Plaza, Santa Barbara	Filipino	October 30, 2024	
Simbahan ng San Carlos (Note: Church of San Carlos)	The construction of a brick church was initiated in 1770. At one point, became the largest church in the Philippines.	Sto. Domingo Church, San Carlos City	Filipino	August 8, 1989	

== See also ==
- List of Cultural Properties of the Philippines in the Ilocos Region

== Bibliography ==
- National Historical Institute (1993). Historical Markers: Regions I-IV and CAR. National Historical Institute.
- National Historical Institute (2008). Historical Markers (1992 - 2006). National Historical Institute.
