= List of Cultural Properties of the Philippines in the Ilocos Region =

This list contains an overview of the government recognized Cultural Properties of the Philippines in the Ilocos Region. The list is based on the official lists provided by the National Commission on Culture and the Arts, National Historical Commission of the Philippines and the National Museum of the Philippines.

Cultural Property wmph identifier (Note: wmph is an internal identifier used by Wikimedia Philippines to identify the monument. This is not an official identifier, and only shown temporarily in the templates until the government creates an updated complete list.)	Site name	Description	Province	City or municipality	Address	Coordinates	Image
PH-01-0001	Bacarra Church	St. Andrew Church	Ilocos Norte	Bacarra	M. Castro Street	18°15′02″N 120°36′42″E	Upload file
PH-01-0002	Badoc Church	St. John the Baptist Church	Ilocos Norte	Badoc	Soriano Street	17°55′41″N 120°28′30″E	Upload file
PH-01-0003	Juan Luna Shrine	Also known as Bahay ni Luna, the Juan Luna Shrine is a reconstruction of the patriot and painter's two-story home.	Ilocos Norte	Badoc	Rizal Street	17°55′38″N 120°28′37″E	Upload file
PH-01-0004	Gregorio Aglipay National Shrine		Ilocos Norte	Batac			Upload Photo
PH-01-0005	Artemio Ricarte Shrine		Ilocos Norte	Batac			Upload file
PH-01-0006	Cape Bojeador Lighthouse	Designed by Engineer Magin Pers y Pers. Constructed and finished by Servicio de Faro under Engr. Guillermo Brockman in 1890.	Ilocos Norte	Burgos	Cape Bojeador Lighthouse Road	18°30′44″N 120°35′53″E	Upload file
PH-01-0007	Gregoria M. Rivera de Quirino Memorial Hospital		Ilocos Norte	Dingras			Upload Photo
PH-01-0008	Puruganan House		Ilocos Norte	Dingras			Upload file
PH-01-0009	Dingras Church Ruins		Ilocos Norte	Dingras			Upload Photo
PH-01-0010	Laoag Church	St. William Cathedral. Chapel of wood and thatch built on this site when the Augustinian friars founded the parish, 1580. Replaced by this church of Italian Renaissance; foundation laid, 1612. Looted by Chieftain Almazan who took possession of Virgin Mary's crown and proclaimed himself king, 1661. Damaged by fire, 1843; repaired by Obras Publicas under Engineer Antonio dela Camara and Fray Santiago Muñiz, 1873–1880. Occupied by Revolutionists, 1898; by American forces 1899. Ownership contested by Aglipayans, 1901. Scene of Diocesan Marian Congress, 1932 and 1949.	Ilocos Norte	Laoag	Juan Luna Street	18°11′38″N 120°35′37″E	Upload file
PH-01-0011	Laoag City Hall		Ilocos Norte	Laoag	Tupas St., Brgy. 14, Poblacion,	18°11′42″N 120°35′31″E	Upload file
PH-01-0012	Anastacia Giron Tupas Marker		Ilocos Norte	Laoag	PhilHealth Office, Tupas St., Brgy. 14, Poblacion	18°11′41″N 120°35′29″E	Upload file
PH-01-0013	Rizal Monument	Built in 1922 in front of the Ilocos Norte Capitol	Ilocos Norte	Laoag	Ilocos Norte Provincial Capitol Grounds, Brgy. 13, Poblacion	18°11′46″N 120°35′35″E	Upload file
PH-01-0014	Abolition of Tobacco Monopoly Monument	Built in 1881 as a way of thanking King Alfonso XII of Spain by the people of Laoag for abolishing the tobacco monopoly.	Ilocos Norte	Laoag	Aurora Park, Brgy. 14, Poblacion	18°11′42″N 120°35′33″E	Upload file
PH-01-0015	Marcos Hall of Justice		Ilocos Norte	Laoag	F.R. Castro, Street, Pan-Philippine Highway, Brgy. 11, Poblacion	18°11′44″N 120°35′32″E	Upload file
PH-01-0016	Laoag City Fountain		Ilocos Norte	Laoag	Aurora Park, Brgy. 14, Poblacion	18°11′44″N 120°35′34″E	Upload file
PH-01-0017	To Thee I Give Monument		Ilocos Norte	Laoag	Aurora Park, Brgy. 14, Poblacion	18°11′45″N 120°35′34″E	Upload file
PH-01-0018	Ilocos Norte Capitol	Seat of the Provincial Government of Ilocos Norte built in Neo-classical style from 1918 to 1924.	Ilocos Norte	Laoag	Ilocos Norte Provincial Capitol Grounds, Brgy. 14, Poblacion	18°11′47″N 120°35′35″E	Upload file
PH-01-0019	Museo Ilocos Norte (also Museo Gameng)	A museum that showcases the cultural heritage of Ilocos Norte.	Ilocos Norte	Laoag	V. Llanes corner Gen. Antonio Luna St	18°11′49″N 120°35′33″E	Upload file
PH-01-0020	Ligot House		Ilocos Norte	Laoag	#11 Gen. A. Luna corner Segundo Ave	18°11′47″N 120°35′39″E	Upload Photo
PH-01-0021	DWC High School Laoag		Ilocos Norte	Laoag	Gen. A Luna Street,	18°11′49″N 120°35′35″E	Upload file
PH-01-0022	Peralta Building	Built in 1957, Currently used as Laoag Rural Bank	Ilocos Norte	Laoag	Gen. A Luna Street,	18°11′49″N 120°35′36″E	Upload file
PH-01-0023	I. Dithas House		Ilocos Norte	Laoag	Lagasca corner Gen. A Luna Street,	18°11′48″N 120°35′37″E	Upload file
PH-01-0024	Balay Niblas		Ilocos Norte	Laoag	Paco Roman corner Gen. A Luna Street,	18°11′48″N 120°35′38″E	Upload file
PH-01-0025	Ermita Hill	Site of the first mass in Ilocos	Ilocos Norte	Laoag	Ilocos Norte Water District Site, Brgy 23, San Andres, Laoag City	18°11′27″N 120°36′01″E	Upload file
PH-01-0026	Governor Roque Ablan Sr. Shrine		Ilocos Norte	Laoag	Bonifacio Street	18°11′32″N 120°35′56″E	More images
PH-01-0027	San Nicolas de Tolentino Chapel	Chapel of San Nicolas de Tolentino inside Laoag Catholic Cemetery.	Ilocos Norte	Laoag	Gomburza Street, Laoag City Cemetery	18°12′15″N 120°35′06″E	Upload file
PH-01-0028	Laoag Catholic Cemetery Cross		Ilocos Norte	Laoag	Brgy. 1	18°12′12″N 120°35′04″E	Upload file
PH-01-0029	Gabaldon Building		Ilocos Norte	Laoag	Laoag Central Elementary School, Brgy. 16	18°11′42″N 120°35′38″E	Upload file
PH-01-0030	Laoag Sinking Bell Tower		Ilocos Norte	Laoag	Paco Roman corner A. Bonifacio Street, Brgy. 14	18°11′42″N 120°35′36″E	Upload file
PH-01-0031	Paoay Church	Located in the town of Paoay, Ilocos Norte in the Philippines, the church is one of the four churches in the Philippines designated as a UNESCO World Heritage Site in 1994. Finished in 1710, it was inaugurated only on February 28, 1896. It was destroyed by an earthquake while being constructed in 1706 and in 1927.	Ilocos Norte	Paoay	MacArthur Street	18°03′42″N 120°31′18″E	More images
PH-01-0032	San Nicolas Church		Ilocos Norte	San Nicolas	Doña Josefa Llanes Escoda National Highway	18°10′26″N 120°35′43″E	Upload file
PH-01-0033	San Nicolas Municipal Hall		Ilocos Norte	San Nicolas	National Highway cor. Madamba Road	18°10′22″N 120°35′37″E	Upload Photo
PH-01-0034	Sarrat Church		Ilocos Norte	Sarrat		18°09′21″N 120°38′42″E	More images
PH-01-0035	Solsona Heritage Town		Ilocos Norte	Solsona		18°05′34″N 120°46′20″E	More images
PH-01-0036	Gregoria M. Rivera de Quirino Memorial Hospital		Ilocos Sur	Vigan			Upload Photo
PH-01-0037	Battle of Bessang Pass Site		Ilocos Sur	Cervantes			Upload file
PH-01-0038	Tirad Pass Shrine		Ilocos Sur	Gregorio del Pilar			Upload Photo
PH-01-0039	Narvacan Church		Ilocos Sur	Narvacan	San Jose Street	17°25′07″N 120°28′36″E	Upload file
PH-01-0040	Magsingal Church	St. Williams Church	Ilocos Sur	Magsingal	National Highway	17°41′05″N 120°25′32″E	Upload file
PH-01-0041	Pasong Diego-Gabriela Silang		Ilocos Sur	Santa			Upload file
PH-01-0042	Santa Maria Church	Nuestra Señora de la Asuncion Church UNESCO World Heritage Site	Ilocos Sur	Santa Maria		17°21′59″N 120°28′59″E	Upload file
PH-01-0043	Gregoria M. Rivera Memorial Library		Ilocos Sur	Vigan			Upload Photo
PH-01-0044	Syquia Mansion		Ilocos Sur	Vigan	Quirino Boulevard cor. Calle Salcedo	17°34′15″N 120°23′23″E	Upload file
PH-01-0045	Vigan Cathedral		Ilocos Sur	Vigan	Burgos Street	17°34′29″N 120°23′20″E	More images
PH-01-0046	Luna Church	Our Lady of Namacpacan Church	La Union	Luna	Namacpacan Road	16°51′12″N 120°22′35″E	Upload file
PH-01-0047	San Fernando Church		La Union	San Fernando	F. Ortega Highway cor. Gomez Street	16°36′56″N 120°19′04″E	Upload file
PH-01-0048	Poro Point Lighthouse		La Union	San Fernando	Wallace Air Station	16°36′54″N 120°16′51″E	Upload file
PH-01-0049	Calasiao Church		Pangasinan	Calasiao	Mamaradlo Street	16°00′36″N 120°21′26″E	Upload file
PH-01-0050	Dagupan Cathedral		Pangasinan	Dagupan	Burgos cor. Jovellanos Streets	16°02′32″N 120°20′04″E	More images
PH-01-0051	Ramos House		Pangasinan	Lingayen			Upload file
PH-01-0052	Manaoag Church		Pangasinan	Manaoag	N. Garcia Street, Manaoag Town Plaza	16°02′38″N 120°29′19″E	Upload file
PH-01-0053	San Carlos Church		Pangasinan	San Carlos	Malong Street, San Carlos City Plaza	15°55′35″N 120°20′50″E	Upload file
PH-01-0054	Old Casa Real and Provincial Capitol		Pangasinan	Lingayen	Pangasinan Capitol Compound	16°02′00″N 120°13′53″E	More images
PH-01-0055	Lingayen I Central School		Pangasinan	Lingayen	Alvear East Street	16°01′48″N 120°13′30″E	Upload Photo

== See also ==
- List of historical markers of the Philippines in the Ilocos Region
