= Syquia Mansion =

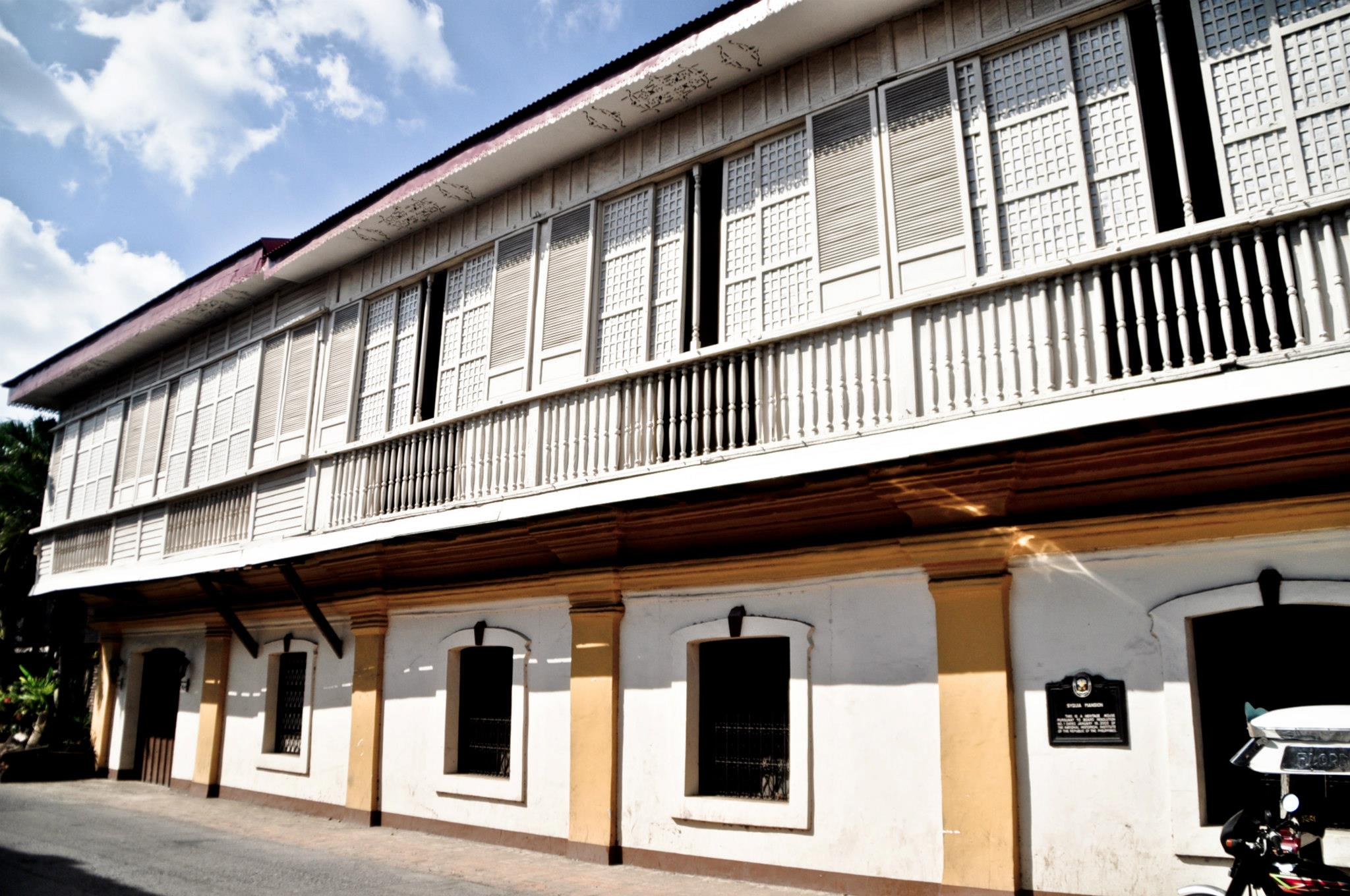
- Facade of Syquia Mansion

- Location in the Luzon Location in the Philippines
- Location: Vigan, Ilocos Sur, Philippines
- Coordinates: 17°34′16″N 120°23′24″E
- Type: Heritage museum
- Building details

General information
- Type: House
- Architectural style: Bahay na Bato
- Construction started: 1830

The Syquia Mansion is a stone house or bahay na bato in Vigan, Ilocos Sur, Philippines. The mansion is one of the oldest bahay na bato houses in Vigan. It now serves as a museum, displaying artifacts, including furniture and paintings, and exhibits about Philippine President Elpidio Quirino.

== History ==
The mansion was built in 1830 by Justo Angco and was given as a dowry on his daughter's marriage to Gregorio Syquia in 1875.

Later on, the ownership of the mansion was passed to Alicia Syquia, the wife of Philippine President Quirino. The couple stayed in the mansion in 1921 when Quirino was still a congressman. The mansion was used as Quirino's retreat house when he became president.

The house was damaged in the 2022 Luzon earthquake, which destroyed some of its walls and windows.

== Architecture ==
Syquia Mansion follows the traditional stone house or bahay na bato structure, common during the time of Spanish colonization in the Philippines. It used stone, brick, and mortar for the ground floor and wood for the upper floor.

== Recognition ==
Syquia Mansion received historical markers from the Philippines Historical Committee in 1951 and the National Historical Institute in 2002.

== Gallery ==
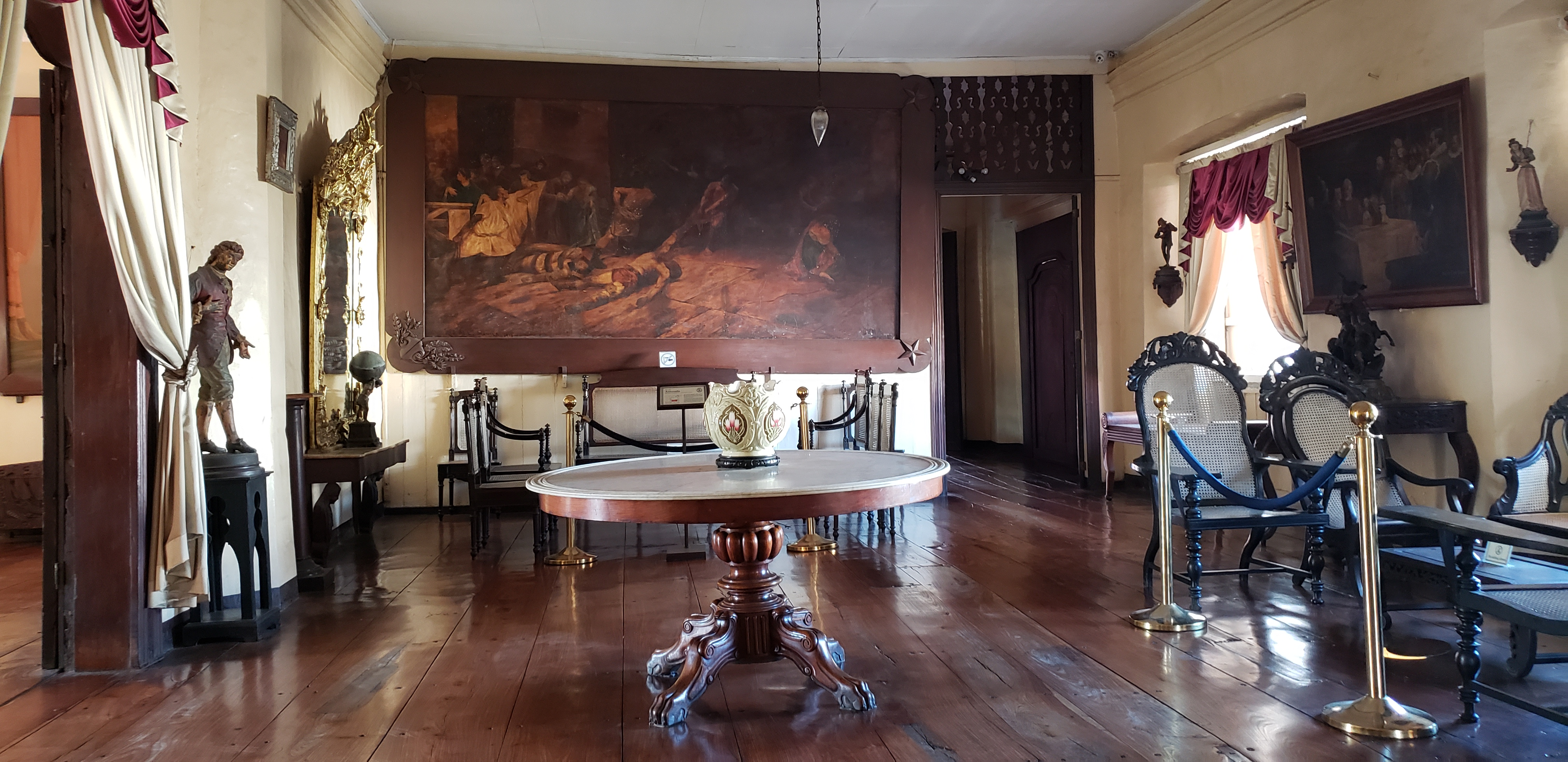
Living room

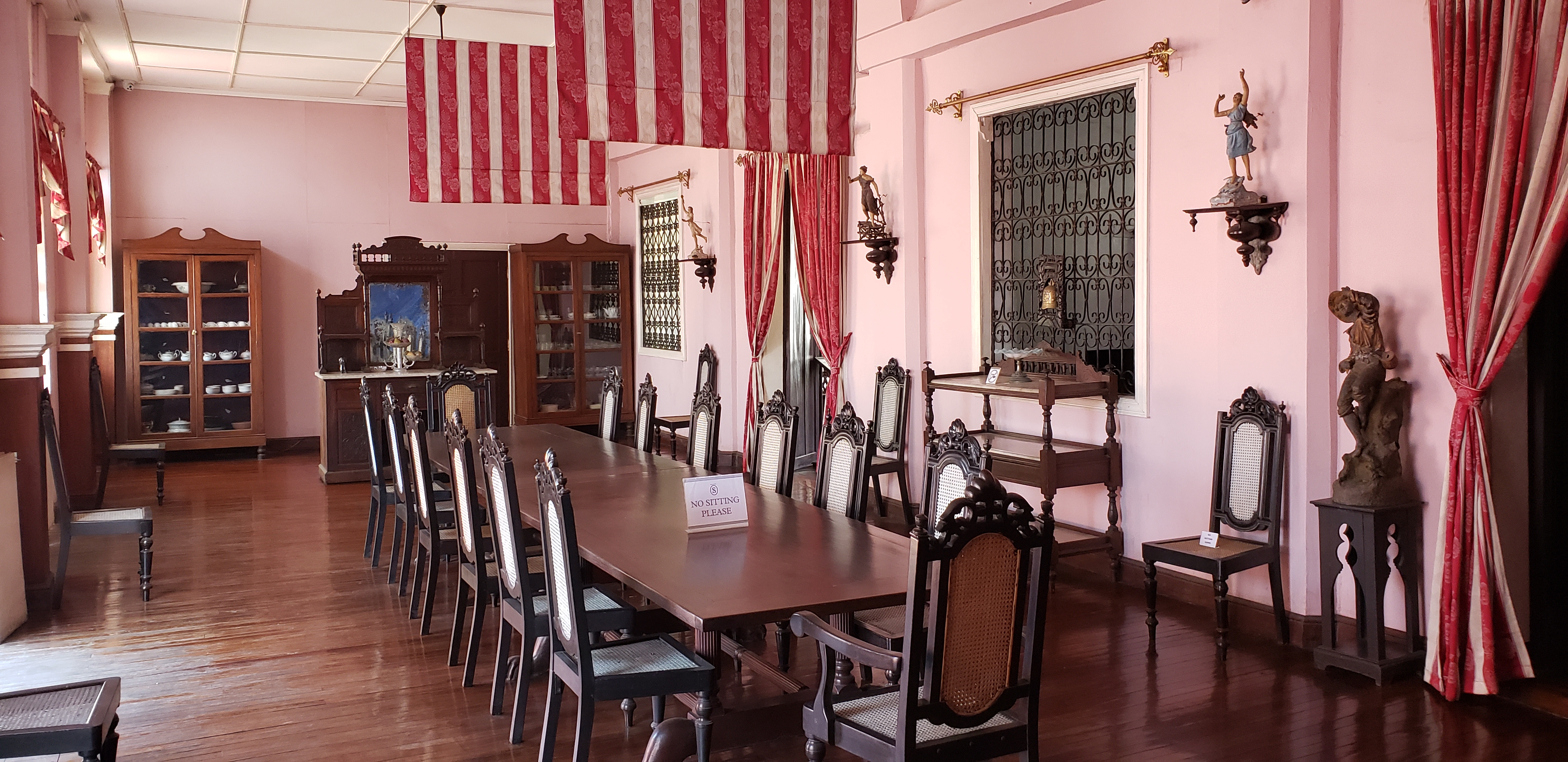
Dining room

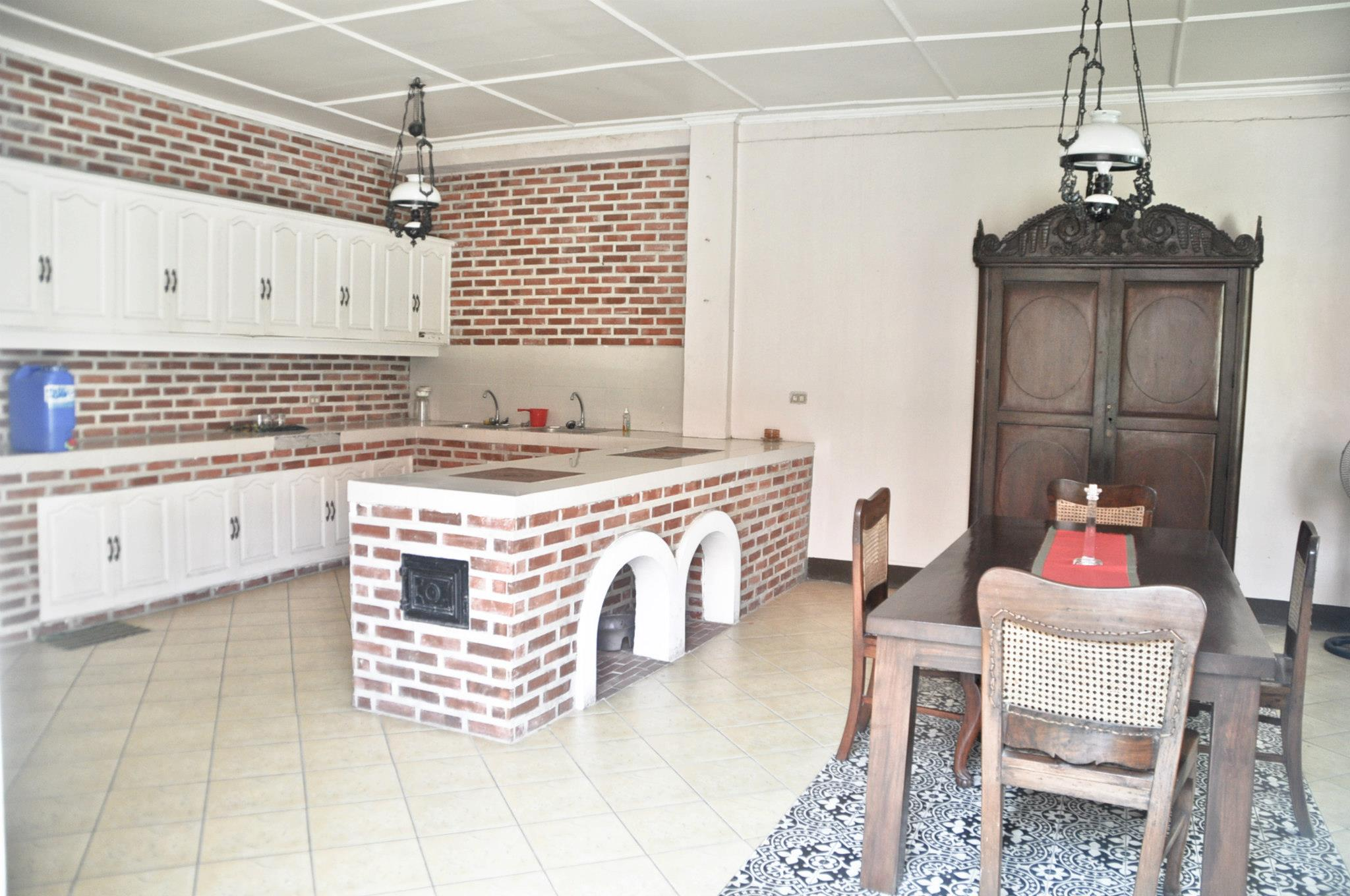
Kitchen

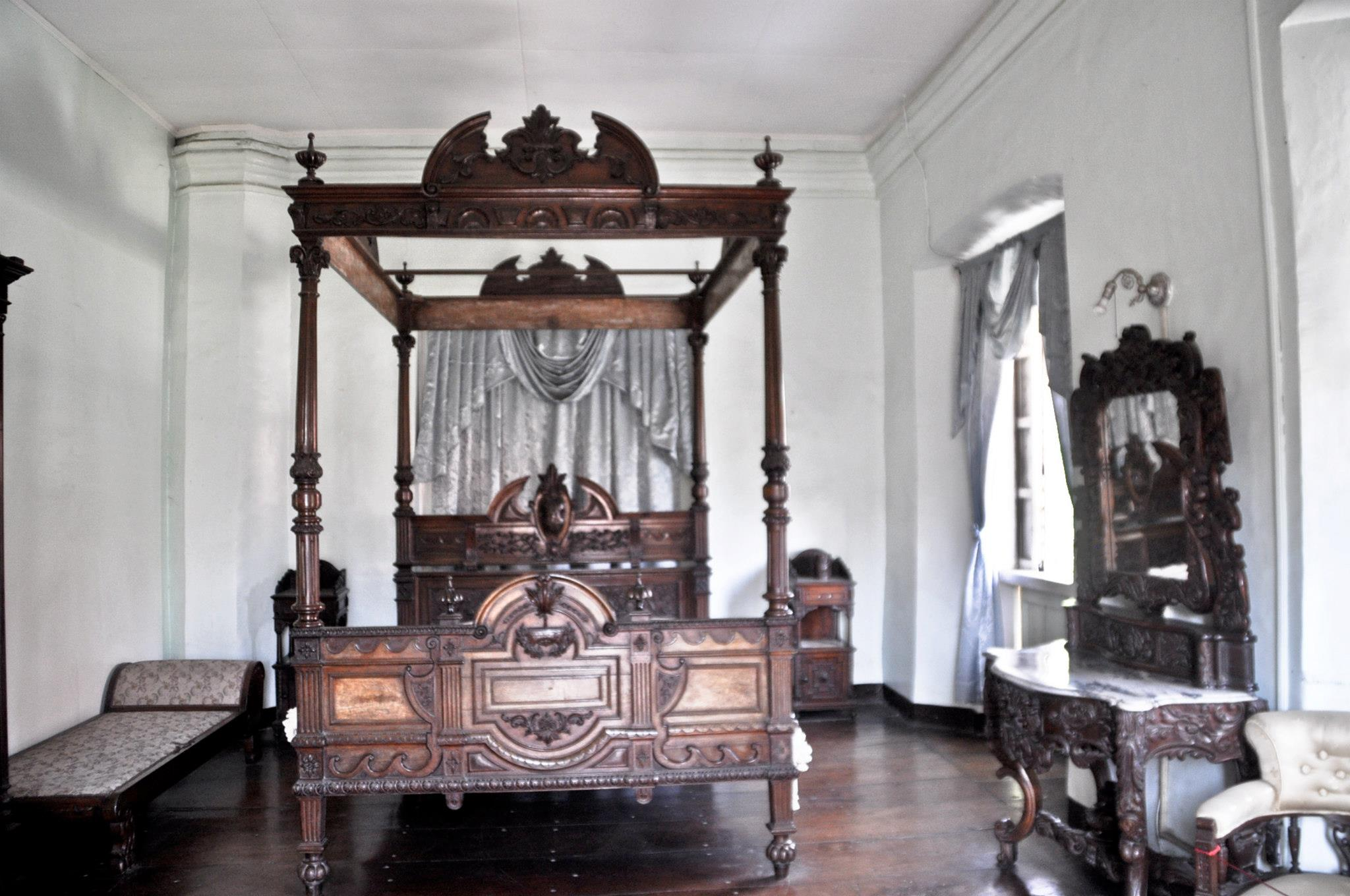
Bedroom

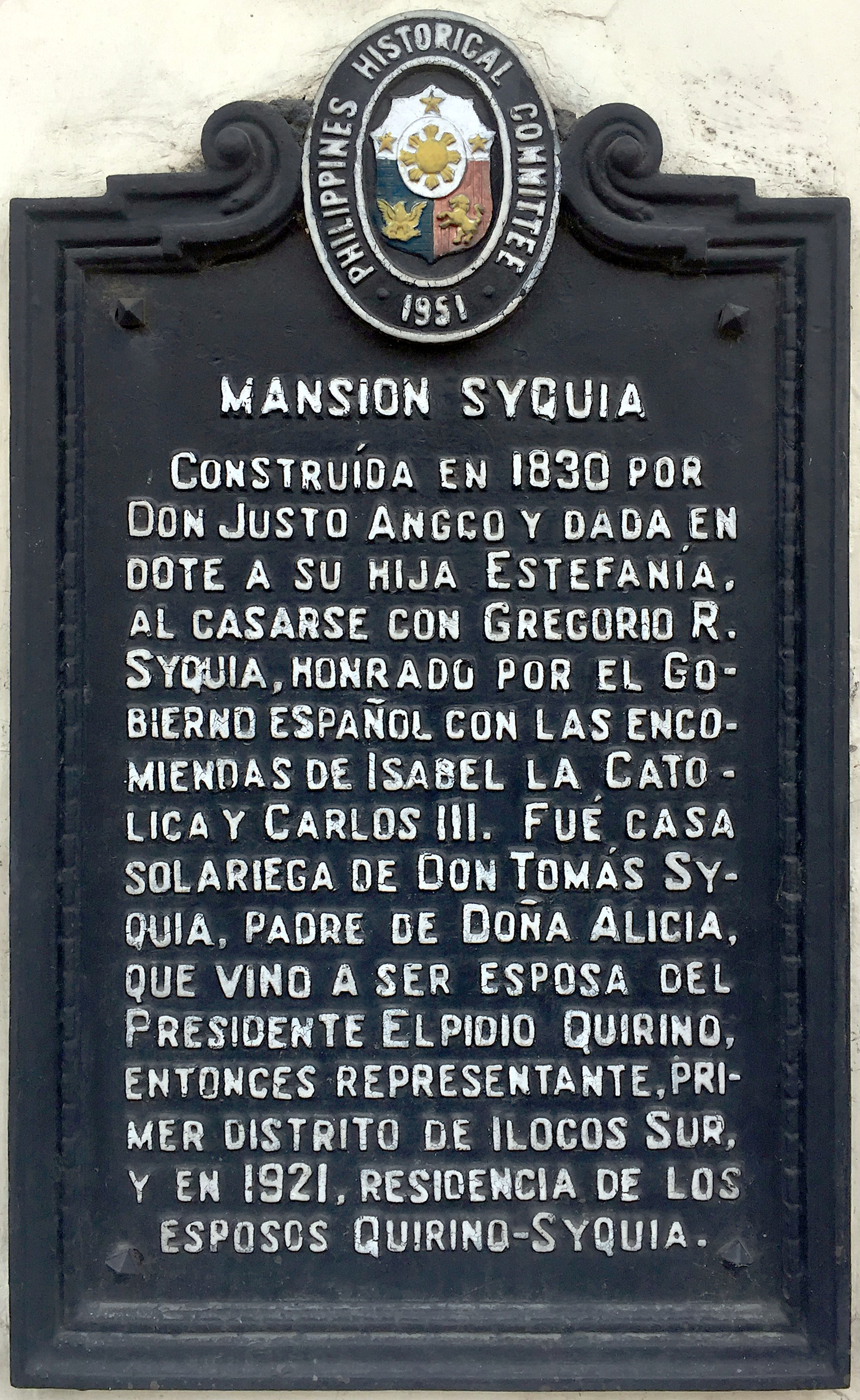
PHC historical marker

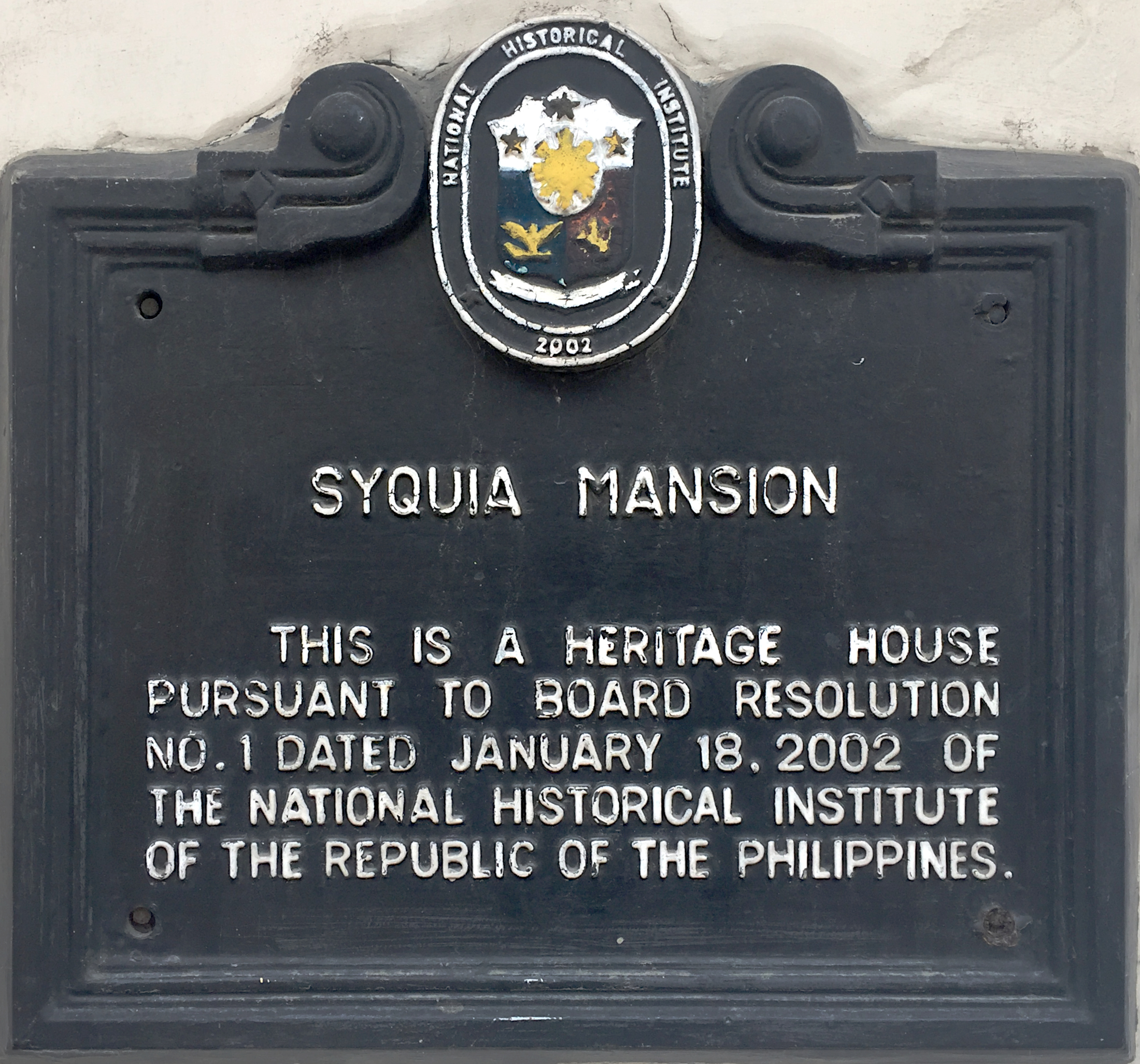
NHI historical marker
