= Santuario de San Juan Evangelista =

Roman Catholic church in Pangasinan, Philippines

- Shrine of Saint John the Evangelist
- Old Dagupan Church
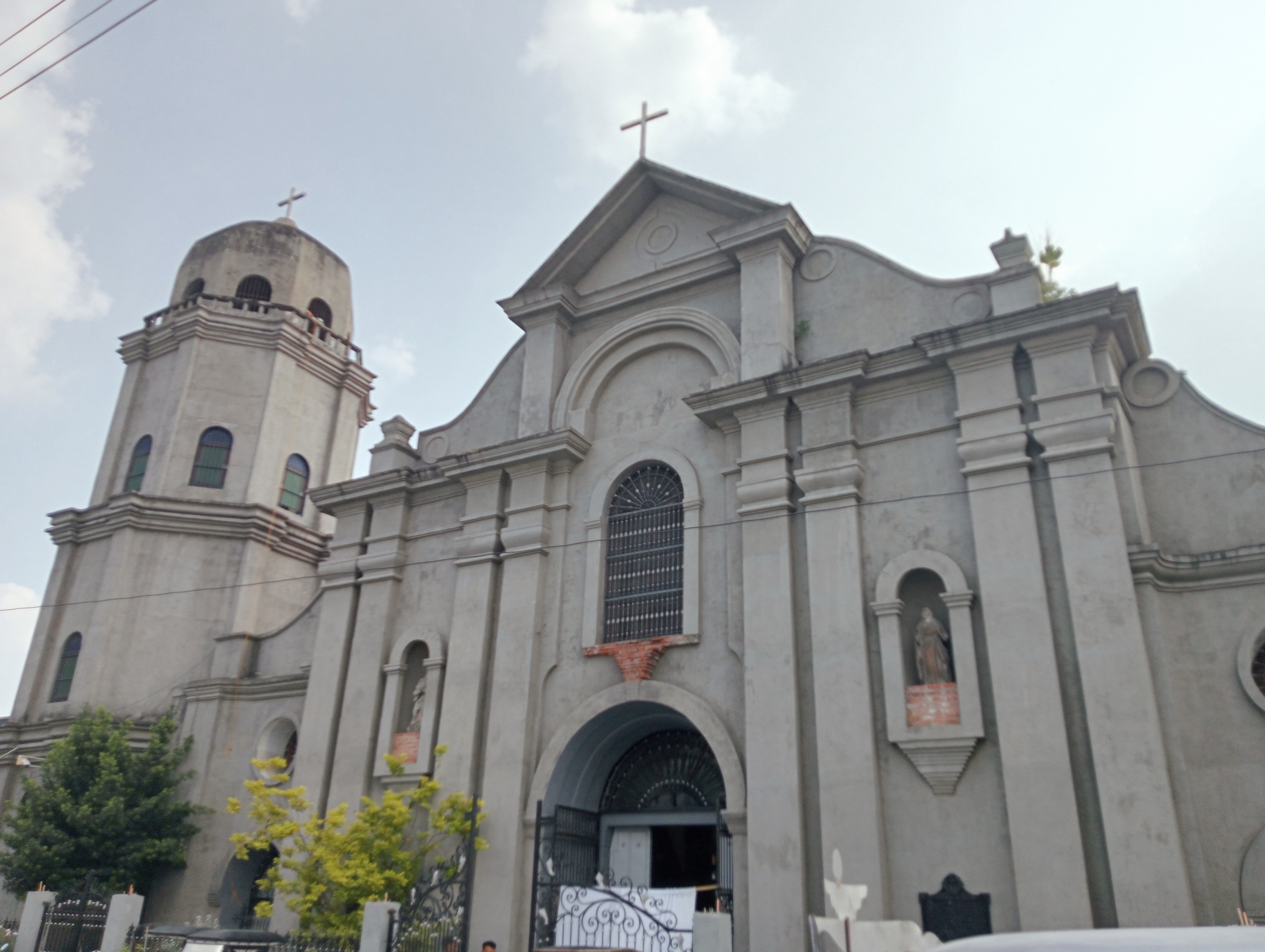
- Church facade in 2024

- Location in Luzon Location in the Philippines
- 16°02′33″N 120°20′06″E
- Location: Zamora and Jovellanos Streets, Dagupan, Pangasinan
- Country: Philippines
- Denomination: Roman Catholic

History
- Status: Archdiocesan Shrine
- Dedication: Saint John the Evangelist

Architecture
- Functional status: Active
- Architectural type: Church building
- Style: Neoclassical architecture
- Years built: 1816 (dst. 1660)
- Completed: c. 1590–1610

Administration
- Archdiocese: Lingayen-Dagupan

Clergy
- Archbishop: Socrates B. Villegas

The Santuario de San Juan Evangelista, also n as the Shrine of St. John the Evangelist or Dagupan Church, is a Roman Catholic church located along Jovellanos Street and Zamora Street, Dagupan, Pangasinan in the Philippines. It belongs to the Archdiocese of Lingayen-Dagupan.

== History ==
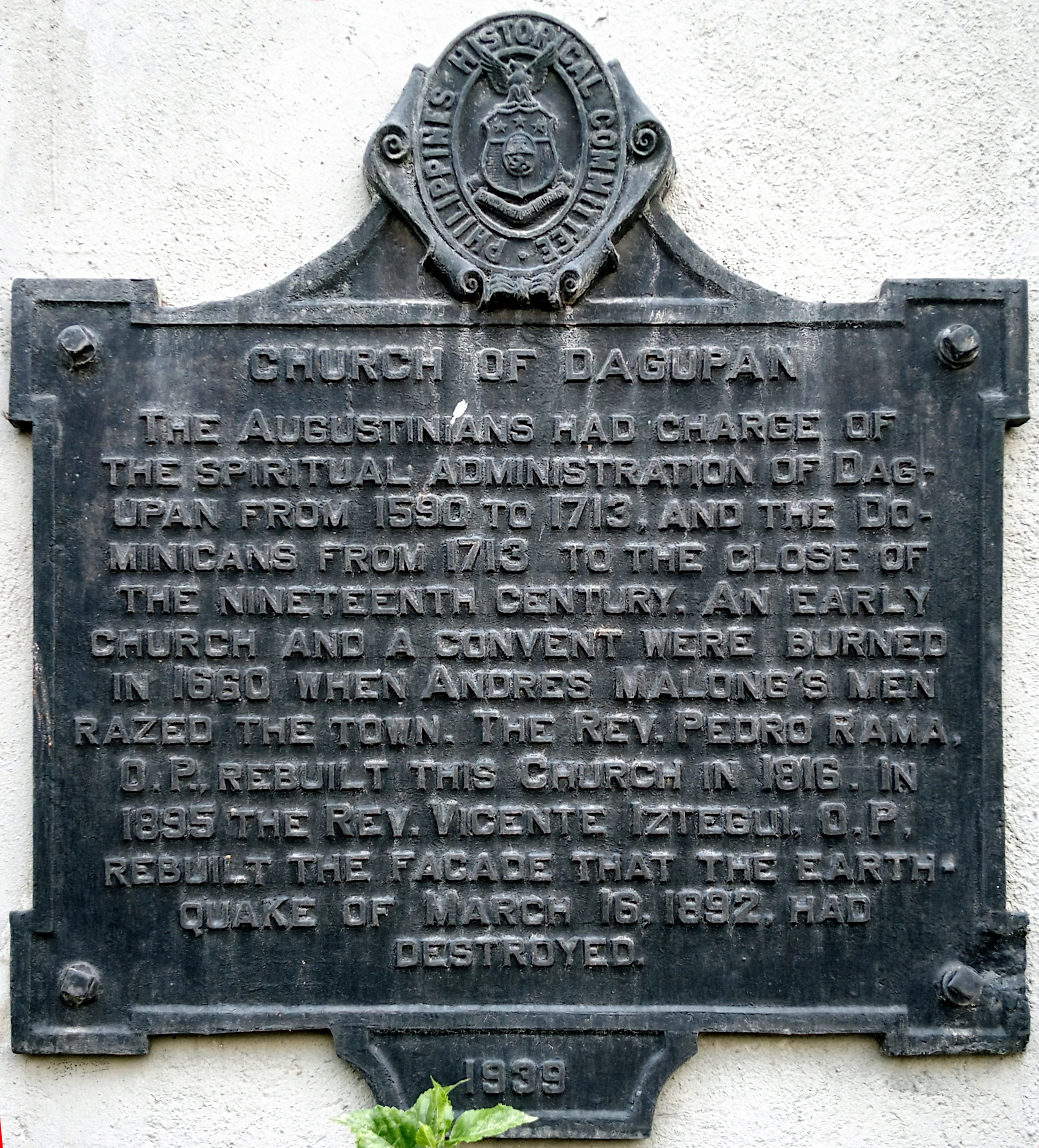
Church PHC historical marker installed in 1939

The shrine traces its origins back to the late 1590s and early 1610s as the parish church of Dagupan, when the Augustinians assumed spiritual administration of the then-town, with Rev. Fr. Kuis Huete serving as the first parish priest.

In 1660, the church was burned by the men of Andres Malong, a local chieftain of Binalatongan (now San Carlos) and leader of the Malong Revolt against the Spaniards. In 1713, the Dominicans took over until the late 19th century. The church was rebuilt in 1816 by Rev. Fr. Pedro de Rama. The church was later destroyed by the earthquake on March 16, 1892, and subsequent disasters up to the 1910s, requiring numerous rebuilds. The convent became the sanctuary to the Spanish rulers in Pangasinan during the 1898 Philippine Revolution against the Spanish colonial rule.

== Gallery ==
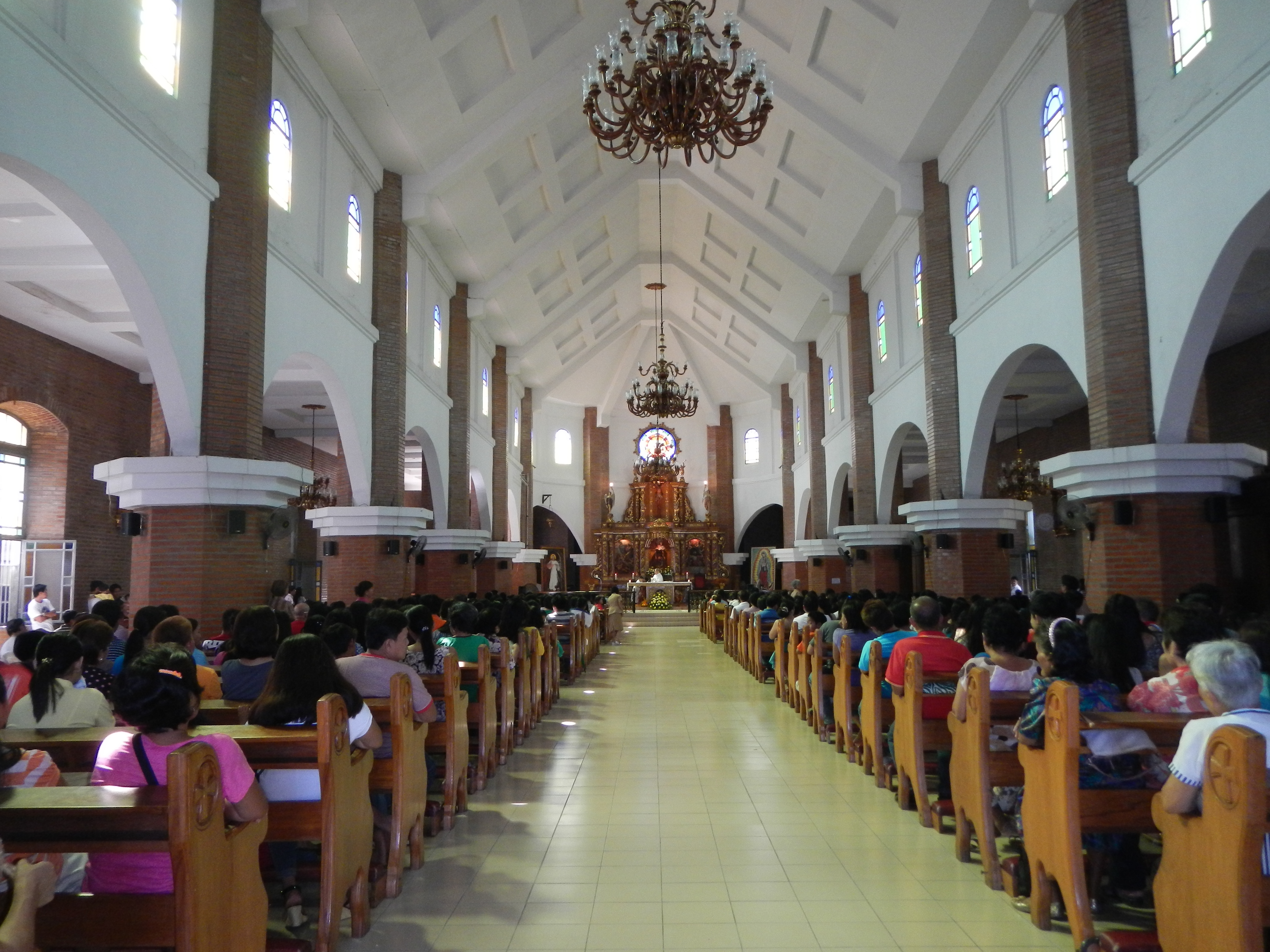
Church interior in 2012

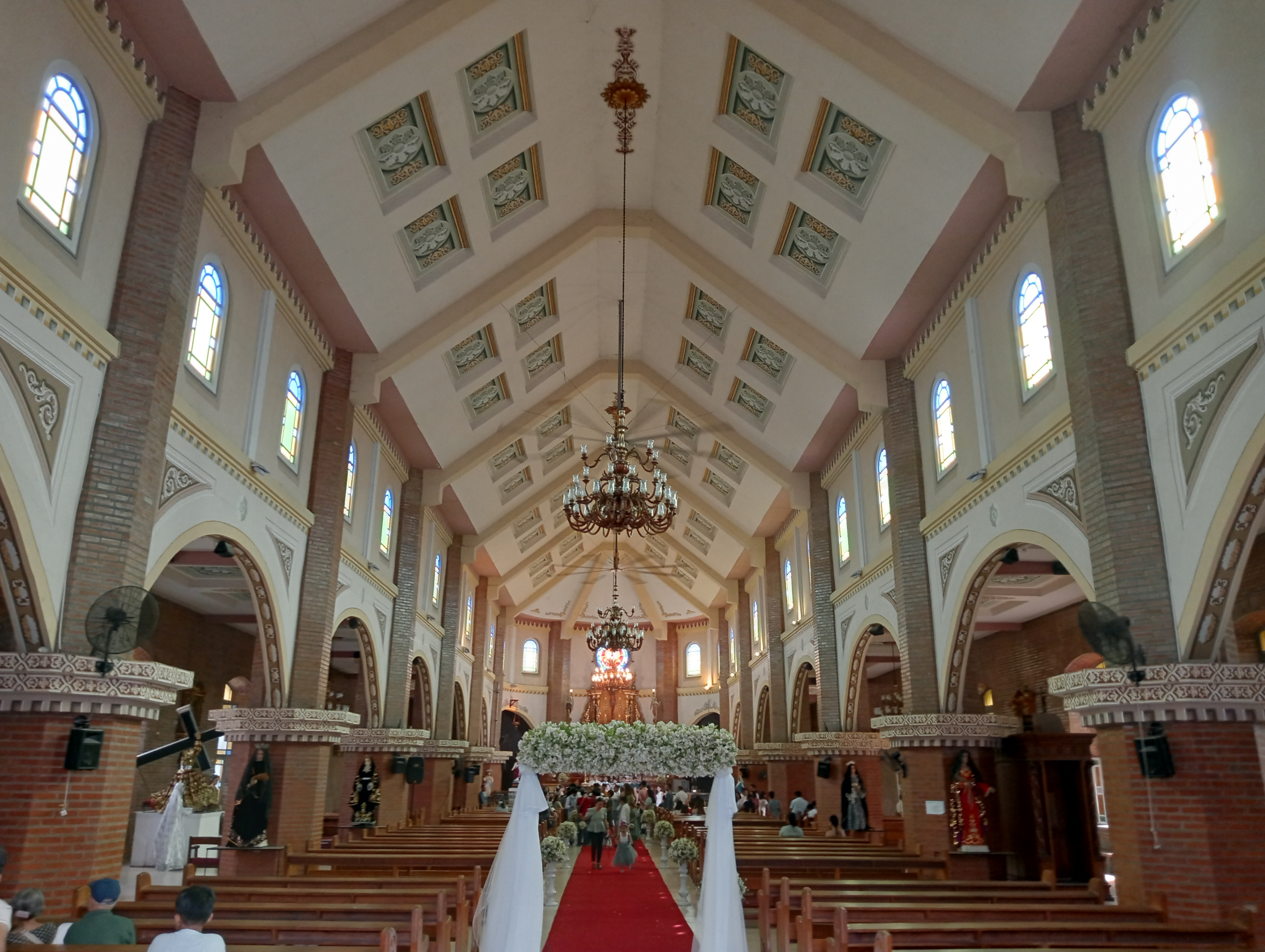
Refurbished interior in 2024
