= San Nicolas Church (Ilocos Norte) =

Roman Catholic church in Ilocos Norte, Philippines

- Diocesan Shrine and Parish of San Nicolás de Tolentino
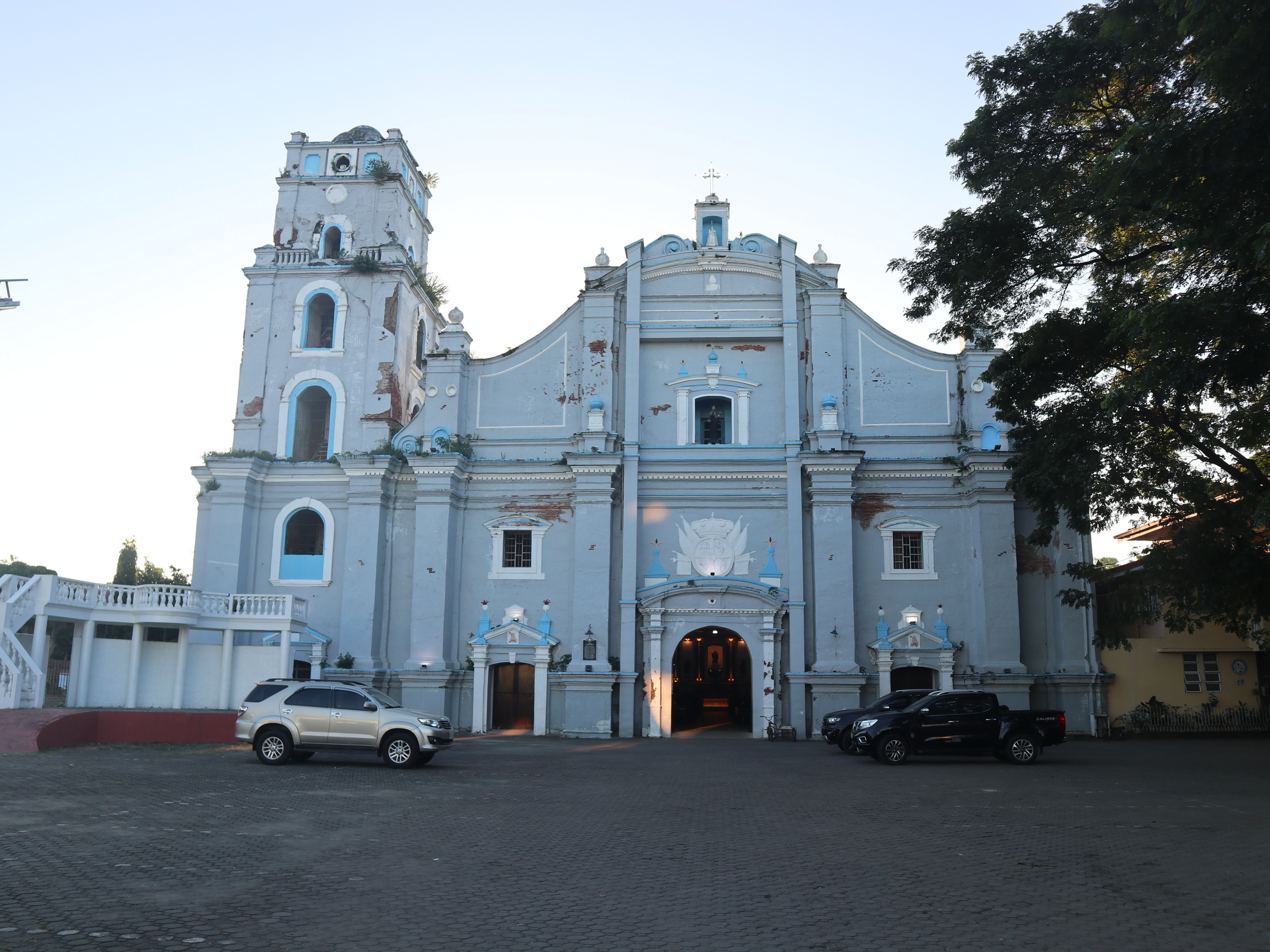
- Church facade in 2022

- Location in Luzon Location in the Philippines
- 18°10′26″N 120°35′42″E
- Location: San Nicolas, Ilocos Norte
- Country: Philippines
- Denomination: Roman Catholic

History
- Former name: Saint Nicolas de Tolentino Parish Church
- Status: Parish church
- Founded: 1584
- Founder: Father Antonio Villanueva
- Dedication: Nicholas of Tolentino

Architecture
- Functional status: Active
- Architectural type: Church building
- Style: Baroque

Administration
- Province: Nueva Segovia
- Metropolis: Nueva Segovia
- Archdiocese: Nueva Segovia
- Diocese: Laoag

Clergy
- Archbishop: David William Antonio
- Bishop: Renato Mayugba

The Diocesan Shrine and Parish of San Nicolás de Tolentino, formerly known as San Nicolas de Tolentino Parish Church, is a Roman Catholic parish church located in the municipality of San Nicolas, Ilocos Norte, Philippines. It is under the jurisdiction of the Diocese of Laoag. Exhibiting a baroque façade, the church bears the Spanish coat of arms. A three-storey belltower on its right was built by Father Vitoriano Garcia.

== History ==
San Nicolas Church was first constructed in 1584, the same year the town was founded by the Augustinian friars. The town then was named Visita de Caluntian because of the abundant lanuti tree in the area.

On July 21, 2020, Bishop Renato Mayugba approved the petition to elevate the church as a diocesan shrine; the church was declared as such in September 10, 2020.

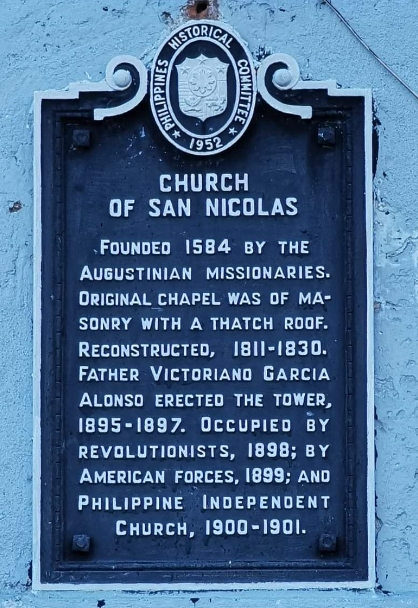
Church PHC historical marker installed in 1952

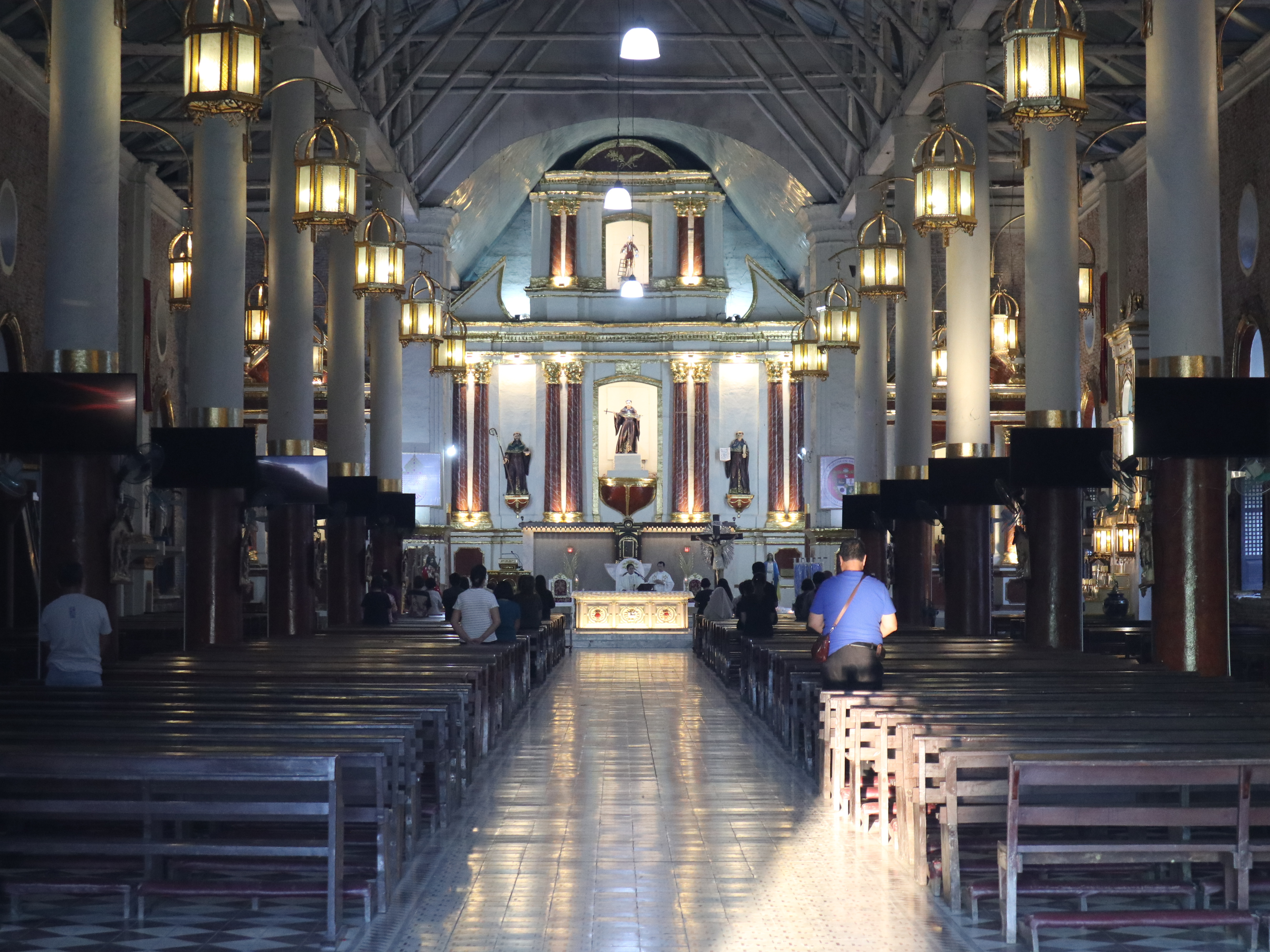
Church interior in 2022
