= San Nicolas, Ilocos Norte =

Municipality in Ilocos Norte, Philippines

San Nicolas
- Municipality
- Municipality of San Nicolas
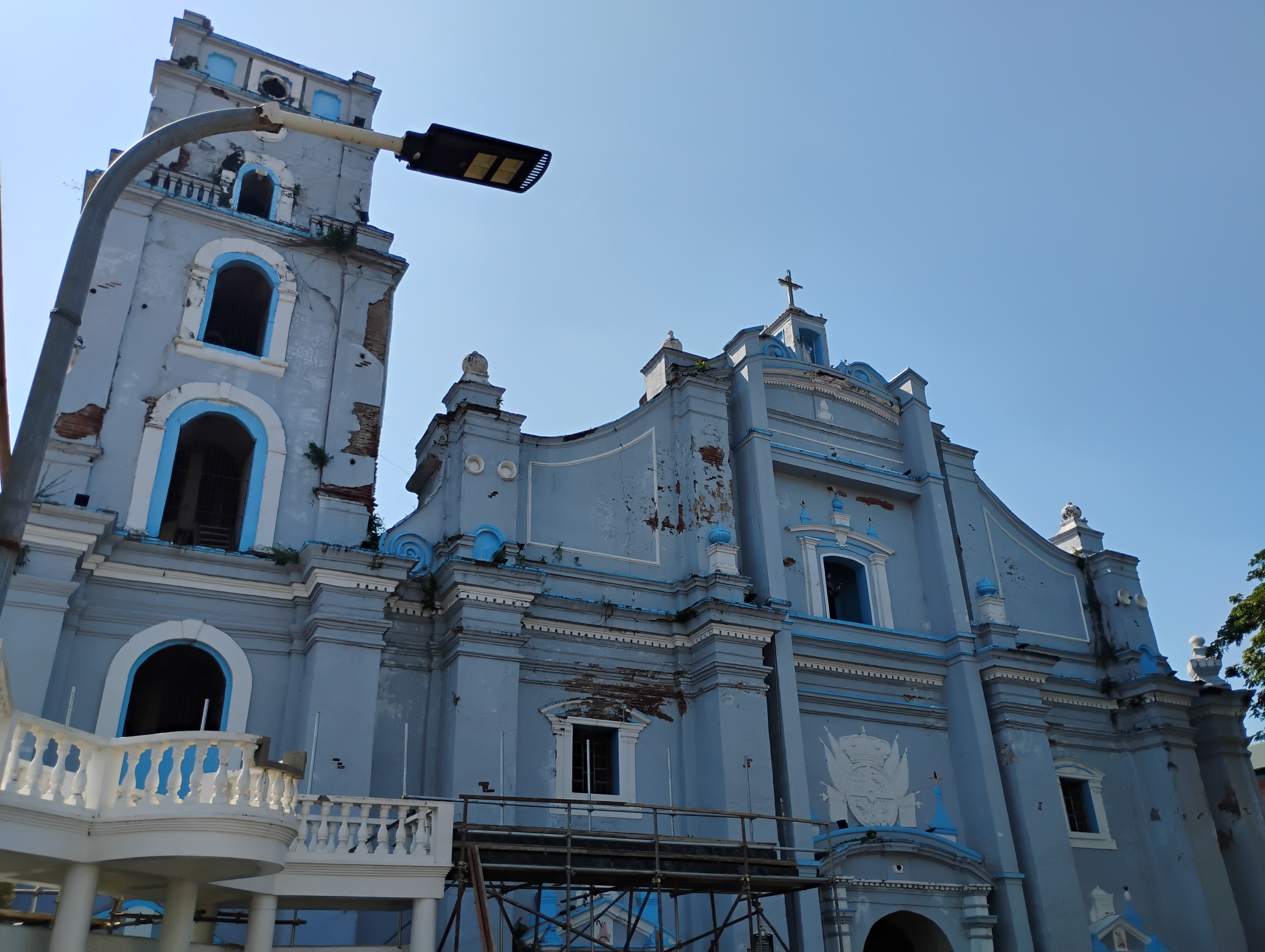
- San Nicolas Church

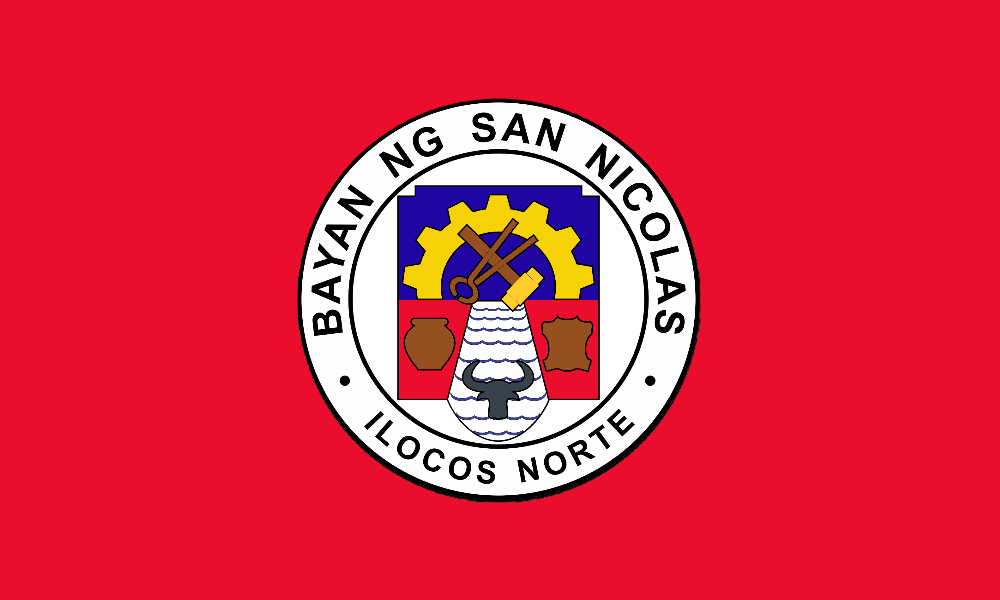
- Flag Seal

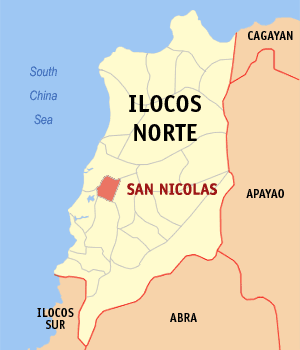
- Map of Ilocos Norte with San Nicolas highlighted
- Interactive map of San Nicolas
- Location within the Philippines
- Coordinates: 18°10′23″N 120°35′38″E
- Country: Philippines
- Region: Ilocos Region
- Province: Ilocos Norte
- District: 2nd district
- Establishment as a Visita: 1584
- Establishment as a Pueblo: 1617
- Fusion to Laoag: October 15, 1903
- Reconstitution as a Town (Separation from Laoag): January 1, 1909
- Named for: St. Nicholas of Tolentino
- Seat: San Nicolas Municipal Hall
- Barangays: 24 (see Barangays)

Government
  - Mayor: Ed Mar Vincent L. Bonoan
  - Vice Mayor: Napoleon L. Hernando
  - Municipal Council: Members: Efren C. Butay; Moera Joy N. Galing-Luna; Erico R. Ruiz, Jr.; Cesar R. Agustin; Luciano R. Caraang; Juanito P. Ulep, Jr.; Chona P. Hernandez; Norberto S. Dadiz, Jr.; Pete B. Duldulao (LnB); Aaron Dean R. Valenzuela (PPSK)
  - Electorate: 26,471 voters (2025)

Area
  - Total: 40.18 km^{2} (15.51 sq mi)
- Elevation: 22 m (72 ft)
- Highest elevation: 137 m (449 ft)
- Lowest elevation: 1 m (3.3 ft)

Population (2024 census)
  - Total: 39,116
  - Density: 973.5/km^{2} (2,521/sq mi)
  - Households: 9,404
- Demonym: San Nicolenio/San Nicolenia

Economy
  - Income Class: 1st municipal income class
  - Poverty incidence: 3.05% (2023)
  - Revenue: ₱ 360.2 million (2024)
  - Assets: ₱ 1,295 million (2024)
  - Expenditure: ₱ 340.5 million (2024)
  - Liabilities: ₱ 28.38 million (2024)

Service provider
  - Electricity: Ilocos Norte Electric Cooperative (INEC)
- Time zone: UTC+8 (PST)
- ZIP code: 2901
- PSGC: 0102820000
- IDD : area code: +63 (0)77
- Native languages: Ilocano; Tagalog
- Website: www.sannicolasilocosnorte.gov.ph

San Nicolas (Ilocano: Ili ti San Nicolas; Filipino: Bayan ng San Nicolas), officially the Municipality of San Nicolas, is a 1st class municipality in the province of Ilocos Norte, Philippines. According to the 2024 census, it has a population of 39,116 people.

== Etymology ==
San Nicolas is the only town in Ilocos Norte that is named after a saint - St. Nicholas of Tolentino. Since 1733, it is believed that he has protected the people against floods, earthquakes, fires, typhoons, and other calamities.

== History ==
Like any other town in the then singular province of Ilocos, San Nicolas was established by Augustinian missionaries. Vigan, the first Spanish mission center in this region, was founded in 1572. In the year 1575, when the Spaniards first explored the Laoag (Padsan) River, they met hostile resistance from the natives of San Nicolas and Laoag. In another expedition dispatched from Vigan in 1584 San Nicolas was established and Laoag followed a year later.

San Nicolas Catholic Church built in 1701 is one of the oldest buildings in this province. Its original structure is one of the must see places of the town. The Church and the attached Santa Rosa Academy Building, the well preserved Municipal Hall and the old Town Plaza sprawled between them constitute the heart of the town center. These buildings and structures are originally built and continue to be festooned with earthen bricks, which is among the products of the surviving locals.

== Geography ==
San Nicolas is situated 3.06 kilometres (1.90 mi) from the provincial capital Laoag, and 479.98 kilometres (298.25 mi) from the country's capital city of Manila.

=== Barangays ===
San Nicolas is politically subdivided into 24 barangays. Each barangay consists of puroks and some have sitios.

Barangays 1 to 15 are within the poblacion area. In parentheses are respective local names.

- Barangay 1, San Francisco
- Barangay 2, San Baltazar
- Barangay 3, San Ildefonso
- Barangay 4, San Bartolome
- Barangay 5, San Silvestre
- Barangay 6, San Juan Bautista
- Barangay 7, San Miguel
- Barangay 8, San Rufino
- Barangay 9, San Lucas
- Barangay 10, San Paulo
- Barangay 11, San Fernando
- Barangay 12, San Cayetano
- Barangay 13, San Eugenio
- Barangay 14, San Gregorio
- Barangay 15, San Jose
- Barangay 16, San Marcos (Payas)
- Barangay 17, Sta. Asuncion (Samac)
- Barangay 18, San Pedro (Bingao)
- Barangay 19, San Lorenzo
- Barangay 20, San Pablo
- Barangay 21, San Agustin (Bugnay)
- Barangay 22, San Guillermo (Catuguing)
- Barangay 23, Sta. Cecilia (Barabar)
- Barangay 24, Sta. Monica (Nagrebcan)

=== Climate ===
Climate data for San Nicolas
Month	Jan	Feb	Mar	Apr	May	Jun	Jul	Aug	Sep	Oct	Nov	Dec	Year
Mean daily maximum °C (°F)	30.0 (86.0)	30.8 (87.4)	32.0 (89.6)	33.4 (92.1)	33.8 (92.8)	32.5 (90.5)	31.8 (89.2)	31.0 (87.8)	31.3 (88.3)	31.9 (89.4)	31.2 (88.2)	30.5 (86.9)	31.7 (89.0)
Daily mean °C (°F)	24.4 (75.9)	25.0 (77.0)	26.5 (79.7)	28.2 (82.8)	29.1 (84.4)	28.4 (83.1)	27.8 (82.0)	27.4 (81.3)	27.5 (81.5)	27.4 (81.3)	26.5 (79.7)	25.4 (77.7)	27.0 (80.5)
Mean daily minimum °C (°F)	18.8 (65.8)	19.2 (66.6)	20.9 (69.6)	23.1 (73.6)	24.4 (75.9)	24.3 (75.7)	24.0 (75.2)	23.9 (75.0)	23.6 (74.5)	22.9 (73.2)	21.9 (71.4)	20.2 (68.4)	22.3 (72.1)
Average rainfall mm (inches)	11.8 (0.46)	1.1 (0.04)	2.5 (0.10)	19.8 (0.78)	125.1 (4.93)	376.8 (14.83)	386.4 (15.21)	547.3 (21.55)	324.1 (12.76)	86.1 (3.39)	45.1 (1.78)	10.2 (0.40)	1,936.3 (76.23)
Average rainy days	1	1	1	2	8	15	17	20	15	8	5	2	95
Source: PAG-ASA

San Nicolas has a tropical savanna climate with warm to hot temperatures year round. Temperatures dips sightly during the winter months between December and February.

== Demographics ==
Population census of San Nicolas

Year	Pop.	±% p.a.
1903	10,880	—
1918	12,244	+0.79%
1939	13,958	+0.63%
1948	15,567	+1.22%
1960	17,721	+1.09%
1970	20,182	+1.31%
1975	22,175	+1.91%
1980	23,384	+1.07%

Year	Pop.	±% p.a.
1990	27,632	+1.68%
1995	29,083	+0.96%
2000	31,688	+1.86%
2007	33,642	+0.83%
2010	34,237	+0.64%
2015	36,736	+1.35%
2020	38,895	+1.21%
2024	39,116	+0.14%

Source: Philippine Statistics Authority

In the 2024 census, the population of San Nicolas was 39,116 people, with a density of 970 inhabitants per square kilometre or 2,500 inhabitants per square mile.

=== Religion ===
Christianity is the predominant religion in the Philippines and is likewise the same in San Nicolas. Among the Christian denominations, the Catholic and Philippine Independent Churches make up the majority. Other Christian denominations represented in the town include Baptists, Pentecostals, Mormons, Charismatics and Jehovah's Witnesses, Church of God World Missions Phil. Inc. Below are the religious buildings situated in San Nicolas:

- Calvary Baptist Church (Barangay 14)
- Everlasting Baptist Church (Barangay 15)
- Solid Rock Baptist Church (Barangay 20)
- Free Gospel Church (Barangay 2)
- Victory Church (Barangay 3)
- Kingdom Hall of Jehovah's Witnesses (Barangay 2)
- Diocesan Shrine and Parish of San Nicolas de Tolentino (Barangay 3)
- Iglesia Filipina Independiente (Barangay 3)
- Church of Jesus Latter-Day Saints (Barangay 2)
- Church of Jesus Latter-Day Saints (Barangay 21)
- Iglesia ni Cristo (Barangay 1)
- Jesus is Lord (Barangay 3)
- Church of God World Missions of the Philippine Inc. (Barangay16 & 17)
- Seventh-day Adventist Church (Barangay 19 San Lorenzo - Tamurong)

== Economy ==
Poverty incidence of San Nicolas (%)

Source: Philippine Statistics Authority

Pottery-making is the main trademark of San Nicolas. It was introduced by the Spaniards mainly in Barangay 8, and they called it Alfareria, meaning "Art of Pottery". Other traditional crafts include the making of Tagapulot, Lapida, Chicharon and Longganisa. The town also has large ricefields.

San Nicolas also has a number of car stores and shops. Robinsons Ilocos, the largest mall in the province is located in the town center.

== Government ==
=== Local government ===
San Nicolas, belonging to the second congressional district of the province of Ilocos Norte, is governed by a mayor designated as its local chief executive and by a municipal council as its legislative body in accordance with the Local Government Code. The mayor, vice mayor, and the councilors are elected directly by the people through an election which is being held every three years.

=== Elected officials ===
Local Government Officials (2025–2028)
Position	Name
Mayor	Ed Mar Vincent L. Bonoan
Vice-Mayor	Napoleon L. Hernando
Sangguniang Bayan Members	Efren C. Butay
Sangguniang Bayan Members	Moera Joy N. Galing-Luna
Sangguniang Bayan Members	Eric R. Ruiz, Jr.
Sangguniang Bayan Members	Cesar R. Agustin
Sangguniang Bayan Members	Luciano R. Caraang
Sangguniang Bayan Members	Juanito P. Ulep, Jr.
Sangguniang Bayan Members	Chona P. Hernandez
Sangguniang Bayan Members	Norberto S. Dadiz, Jr.
Sangguniang Bayan Members	Pete B. Duldulao (Liga ng mga Barangay President)
Sangguniang Bayan Members	Aaron Dean R. Valenzuela (Pambayang Pederasyon ng mga Sangguniang Kabataan President)

=== Municipal seal ===
- Shield, derived from the Provincial Seal of Ilocos Norte
- Gear, symbolizes the systematic livelihood of the people of San Nicolas, Ilocos Norte
- Tong and Hammer, represents the blacksmithing and labor
- Jar, signifies the pottery industry which dates back to the Spanish time
- Hide, denotes tannoing and leather craft
- Water, represents the irrigation system that produces two croppings a year
- Carabao Head, the common work-animal; friend of the farmer; symbolizes agriculture

== Tourism ==
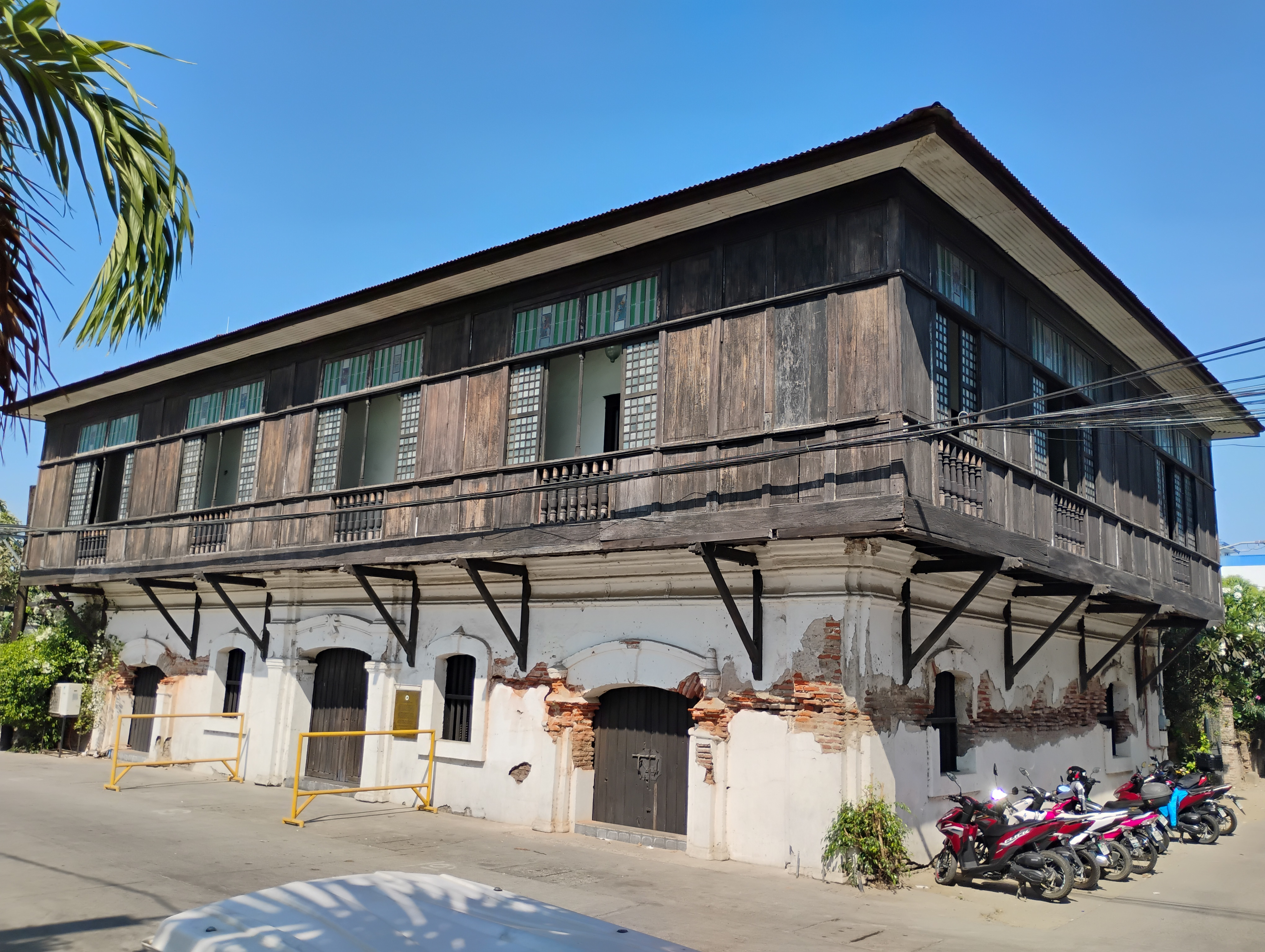
Balay San Nicolas

San Nicolas is a place of historic buildings. Examples are San Nicolas de Tolentino Parish Church and San Nicolas Municipal Hall.

- Damili Festival- A festival annually celebrated at the last week of December to showcase the pottery tradition of San Nicolenos. And the highlights of the festival is the Damili Street Dance and Showdown Competition usually held every December 28.
- Valdez Center-The biggest project of Venvi Group of Companies. Robinsons Mall, 365 Plaza, Freddo, Balai Condominium, and McDonald's San Nicolas, Venvi IT Park (Accenture, a BPO Company), VYV San Nicolas (EGS, a BPO Company) are situated here. More infrastructure is seen to rise in this place. This area is the business district of San Nicolas and is also an emerging business center in Ilocos Norte.
- Robinsons Ilocos - the first full-service and currently the largest mall in the province. It was opened on December 3, 2009. It contributes to the town's revenues and to the province as well. The mall has undergone expansion to cater the growing market of the province.
- Northwestern University Ecotourism Park and Botanical Gardens-A member of the Botanic Garden Conservation International (BGCI), which caters to the conservation of important indigenous plant species of the province which are now on the verge of extinction.
- Diocesan Shrine and Parish of San Nicolás de Tolentino
- San Nicolas Town Plaza
- Museo San Nicolenio (Buabo-Buabo)
- Valdes Residencia
- Balay San Nicolas - formerly known as the Valdez-Lardizabal House. It was used in World War II as a Headquarters of the Japanese Army and also used in the American Regime.
- San Nicolas Municipal Hall

== Healthcare ==
- The Black Nazarene Hospital, Inc - located in Barangay 2
- Municipal Health Center - located in Barangay 3
- Gertes Hospital - located in Barangay 15
- Mamaclay Clinic - located in Barangay 7

== Sports ==
Basketball is widely played in the town. Every year, there is a competition in basketball sponsored by the local government. As the countries' National Game, Sepak Takraw is also played. Volleyball, baseball, softball and badminton are also played mainly in schools.

== Events ==
Damili Festival

- San Nicolas, the home of the famous "damili," a product of a rare soil given by God.This is a lively song 'Agdamdamili' at the same time a graceful occupational dance that was adopted into the town fiesta which falls in December. This is the highlight of the festivities for which the 24 barangays of the town prepared a month before. The colorful costumes, the gracefulness of the dancers, and the different intricacies of making damili give life to the contest.
- In the municipality of San Nicolas, there is a contest where students are encouraged to join in that could measure their knowledge of the pertinent facts of the said municipality. According to the author of the book "History of San Nicolas", Fiscal Manuel Flores Aurelio, a noted historian, digested and elucidated all the pertinent facts about San Nicolas from where it started as a pueblo, now a second-class municipality.

== Education ==
The San Nicolas Schools District Office governs all public and private elementary and high schools within the municipality.

=== Primary and elementary schools ===
- Asuncion Elementary School
- Barabar Elementary School
- Bingao Elementary School
- Bugnay Elementary School
- Catuguing Elementary School
- Cayetano Bumanglag Elementary School
- Delasan Learning Center
- Early Childhood Learning Center of St. Therese
- Eladio V. Barangan Memorial Elementary School
- Filipinas East Elementary School
- Filipinas West Elementary School
- Pasion Barangan Memorial Elementary School
- San Nicolas Elementary School
- Sta. Rosa Academy

=== Secondary schools ===
- Bingao National High School
- San Nicolas National High School
- Sta. Rosa Academy

== Sister cities ==
- Agoo, La Union
- Licab, Nueva Ecija
