= Minor Basilica of Saint Dominic (San Carlos) =

Roman Catholic church in Pangasinan, Philippines

San Carlos Basilica
- Minor Basilica of Saint Dominic
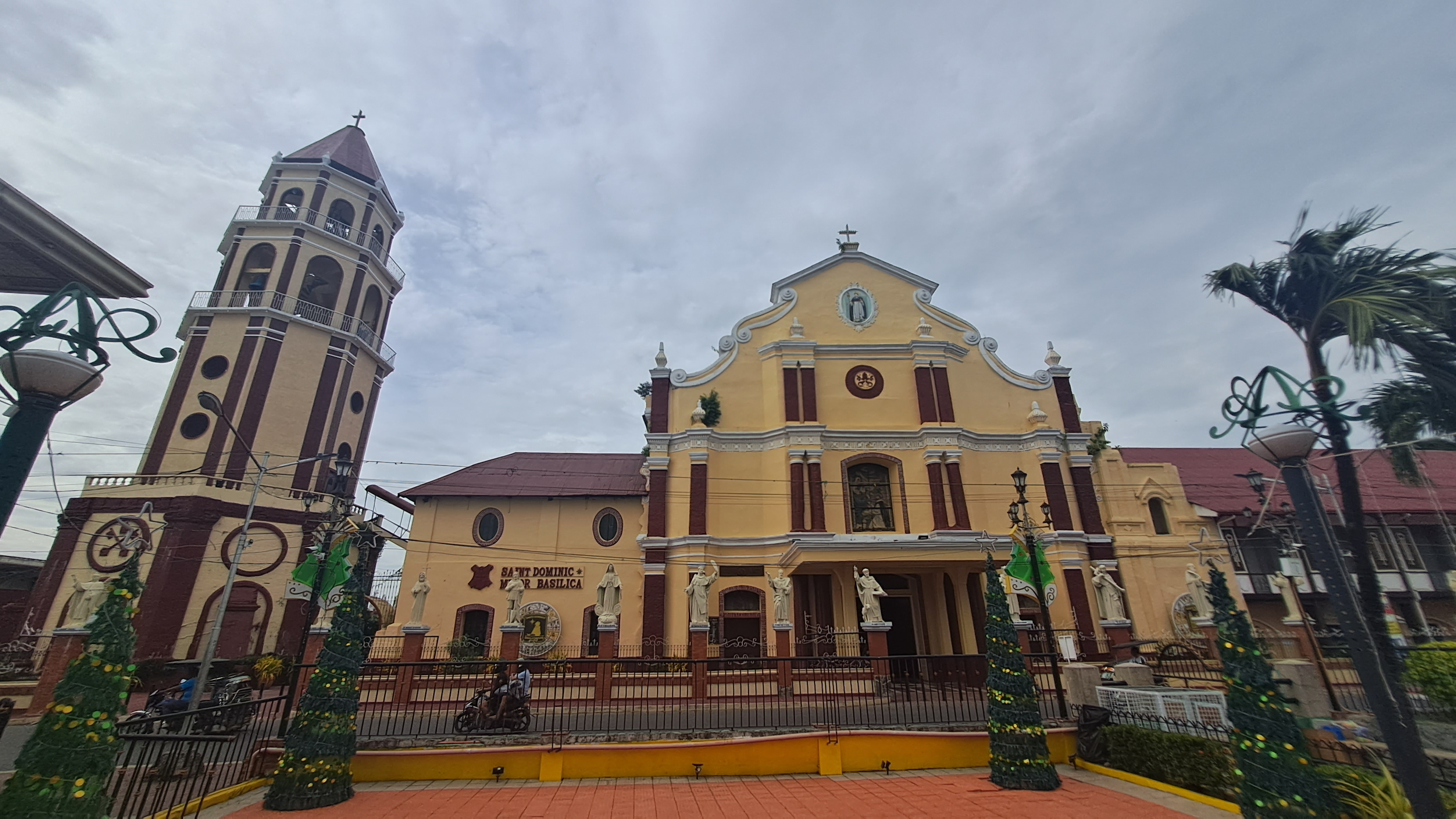
- Basilica facade in November 2023

- Location in Luzon Location in the Philippines
- 15°55′35″N 120°20′50″E
- Location: San Carlos, Pangasinan
- Country: Philippines
- Denomination: Roman Catholic

History
- Former name: Saint Dominic Parish Church
- Status: Minor basilica
- Founded: 1587
- Dedication: Saint Dominic

Architecture
- Functional status: Active
- Architectural type: Church building
- Style: Baroque
- Completed: 1890

Specifications
- Length: 89 yd (81 m)
- Width: 22 yd (20 m)
- Materials: Bricks and Wood

Administration
- Archdiocese: Lingayen-Dagupan

Clergy
- Rector: Fr. Mario Dominic C. Sanchez
- Priest: Fr. Primo V. Aquino

The Minor Basilica of Saint Dominic, formerly known as Saint Dominic Parish Church, is a Roman Catholic minor basilica located in San Carlos, Pangasinan in the Philippines. It is under the jurisdiction of the Archdiocese of Lingayen-Dagupan. The church, made out of bricks or ladrillo, used to be the largest Catholic church in the Philippines during the late 18th century, The church was finished in 1773, under the administration of Father Cristobal Ausina. However, it was destroyed by three earthquakes in 1789, 1796, and 1799.

== History ==
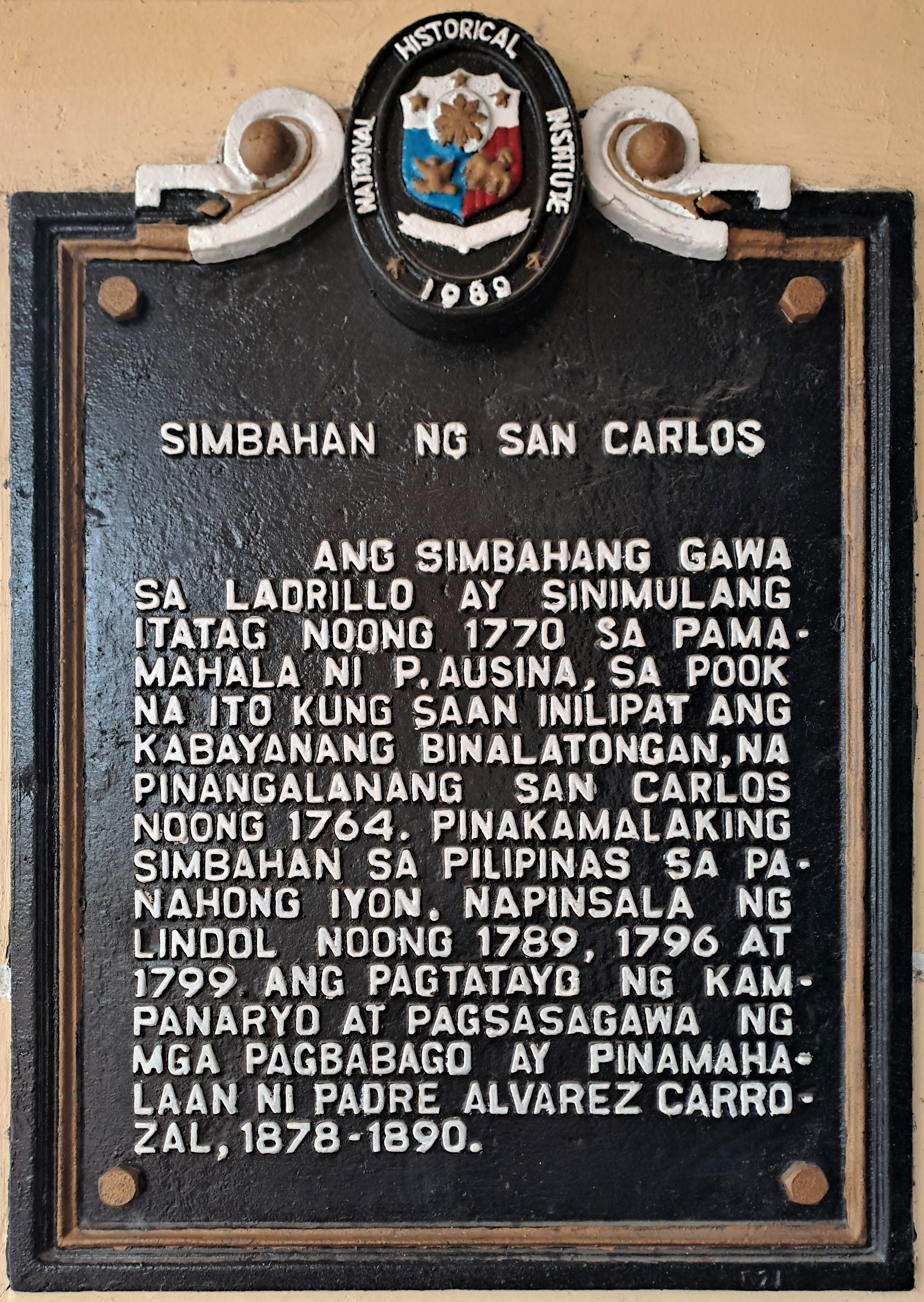
Church NHI historical marker installed in 1989

The history of the Saint Dominic church is intertwined with the history of San Carlos. Each time the site of the town center was changed in the past, the first step was always the construction of the church.

The beautiful edifice, said to the be the largest church north of Manila in the 18th century, is the house of God which our forefathers built. This first one was a humble chapel probably of bamboo and nipa, constructed in 1587, four hundred and thirty-six years ago today. According to the Dominican historian, Fr. Mora, it was built on the western side of the Agno River, near the mountains of Zambales. It was, however, subjected to the floods and the good Fathers decided to transfer the site of the church to a higher ground across the river, where the mongo bean was grown in abundance. Hence, the town came to be called “Binalatongan”. That site was known as Baleyadaan (old town) in the nineteenth century. The site of the church was, of course, the center of the poblacion. The first capacious church of Binalatongan was built of wood. It was furnished with a huge bell, whose sonorous tones could be heard for miles around, summoning the faithful to mass in the morning and reminding them to recite the Angelus in the evening. The casting of this bell was the accomplishment of Fr. Francisco de la Maza, the Vicar of Binalatongan from 1686 to 1690.

The first church of wood burned down in 1718 on the fourth of August at eleven in the morning. We might surmise that since the fourth of August was the traditional feast of St. Dominic, they probably had too many candles lighted and after the last high mass was said on the feast of St. Dominic, some lighted candles might have been left burning and caused an accidental fire.

A third church, larger and bigger, was constructed in the year 1721. This time was made of wood with walls of brick. The church was again burned in the year 1763, but the fire was no longer an accident. It was the result of Palaris revolt of the period. After the revolt was quelled in March 1764, the site of the poblacion was changed to the present site and the name of the town was also changed to San Carlos by order of Charles III, King of Spain. According to the church books in San Carlos, no baptisms were recorded between December 24, 1763, and June 2, 1764. It may therefore be surmised that the transfer to the present site and the reconstitution of the town was accomplished between the end of March and the early part of June 1764. What was left of the brick wall of the old church in Baleyadaan was transferred to the present site, hence, that site came to be known as Abagbagan. It was during the transfer of what was left of the church’s furnishings that the huge bell, the pride of Binalatongan was lost. Probably, because of the weight of the bell, the barge carrying it sank into the San Juan River.

The Vicar of San Carlos at that time was Fr. Andres Melendrez, also the Vicar Provincial of the province. The fact that the Vicar of San Carlos was also the Vicar Provincial gives us a clue as to the importance of the town in the Spanish period. In fact, Binalatongan from the beginning of Spanish rule was the headquarters of the Dominican Order in Pangasinan and it was always staffed by at least four friar missionaries. It had a very large jurisdiction as four towns were later born of San Carlos: Aguilar in 1805, Mangatarem in 1835, Urbiztondo in 1852, and Basista, only recently in the modern period (1961).

The construction of the present church was commenced in 1770 by Fr. Melendrez. This time it was bricks and stone masonry, it was finished in 1773 under Fr. Ausina. It was the largest church in the Philippines at that time. The Gobernadorcillos or Capitanes of the town from 1770 to 1773 when it was under construction were Juan de Vera, Gaspar de los Reyes, Juan Austria, and Marcos Cayabyab. They were the town officials responsible in carrying out the project, procuring the needed materials and assigning the polistas or carlianes who would labor on the construction.

Because of the union of the church and state during that period, all these projects were undertaken by the town municipal officials, under the direction, of course, of the church officials.

The church suffered from the earthquakes of 1789, 1796, and 1799. In 1802, the façade and the walls were strengthened and reinforced when Simon Tamondong was the Captain. This edifice had suffered from some fires, one of which is repaired and improved.

The length of the church interior up to the chancel is 89 meters, the width almost 20 meters, while the height is 16.5 meters. It is so high that, you will note, the church has upper and lower windows. At that time it was built, it was unequalled in height and breadth in the whole country. The church and convent area had a perimeter of some three hectares. But this church property had been because Don Francisco Muñoz, town president in 1912 to 1915, was able to persuade Rev. Fr. Isidro Montoya, parish priest, to donate to the town the one which now constitutes the town plaza.

Under Fr. Alvarez Carrozal, Vicar from 1878 to 1890, many improvements were made. The capitanes who carried out these improvements were Luis Datuin, Lorenzo Claudio, Jose Manzon, Leonardo Banaag, Vicente Manzon and Domingo Magali. The pavement was renovated and painted. It was also during this period that the foundations of the tower were laid, raising the level at its floors nine meters and the church yard was enclosed by iron railing. Fr. Carrozal was also responsible for securing bells, which compared to those Church in Manila were just magnificent.

The church ornaments are equally precious. Among others, there is a gold chalice and vestments of the highest quality.

The Dominican missionaries of the town officials under whom the church was built and improved, all the labor and materials were furnished by our ancestors under compulsory labor and tribute systems of that regime. We would therefore take pride in the achievements of our ancestors.

San Carlos produced ordained priests, such as the following:

1. Rev. Fr. Jorge S. Bacani III
2. Rev. Fr. Agripino Bañez +
3. Rev. Fr. Mark M. Bautista
4. Rev. Fr. Calugay *
5. Rev. Fr. Gualberto Castro, OSB +
6. Rev. Fr. Samuel H. Canilang, CHM
7. Rev. Fr. Jimmy Catungal
8. Rev. Fr. Ponciano Doria
9. Rev. Fr. Carlos Frias * +
10. Rev. Fr. Santiago Frias * +
11. Rev. Fr. Domingo G. Frias, OFM * +
12. Rev. Fr Primo Garcia +
13. Rev. Fr. Ramon Gomez
14. Rev. Fr. Arnaldo de Guzman ~
15. Rev. Fr. Renato de Guzman
16. Rev. Fr. Alejandro Ignacio +
17. Rev. Fr. Armand Magleo ~
18. Rev. Fr. Jesus Ch. Mendoza, OFM +
19. Rev. Fr. Nico Angelo M. Mendoza
20. Rev. Fr. Benigno G. Muñoz +
21. Rev. Fr. Mauro Muñoz ~
22. Rev. Fr. Arcardio B Muñoz ~
23. Rev. Fr. Douglas C. Nicolas +
24. Rev. Fr. Agerico (Jerry) M. Orbos, SVD
25. Archbishop Marlo M. Peralta, DD
26. Rev. Fr. Francisco Posadas +
27. Rev. Fr. Diosdado P. Posadas
28. Rev. Fr. Francisco Lucas C. Posadas
29. Rev. Fr. Angel Resultay +
30. Rev. Fr. Reynaldo V. Romero
31. Rev. Fr. Roy Joel Rosal
32. Rev. Fr. Orlando C. Sabangan *
33. Rev. Fr. Mario Dominic C. Sanchez
34. Rev. Fr. Manuel L. Sayson
35. Rev. Fr. Melquiades Serraon
36. Rev. Fr. Sidney Soriano ~

* From Basista, barangay of San Carlos until 1965

+ Deceased

~ Left the Priesthood

San Carlos City has a population of about 188,571 (based on 2015 Census) living in 86 barangays. Aside from the main parish which has been founded in 1587 by the Dominican Missionaries, there are five other Parishes in the city, and one Chaplaincy.

Holy Family Parish in Tandoc was founded in 2007; St. Joseph, Husband of Mary Parish in Malacañang, in 2012. St. John Paul II Parish in Aponit and Most Holy Trinity Parish in Manzon became a Parish in 2020, and the St Pedro Calungsod in Turac in 2021. St. Francisco Gil de Federich is a Chaplaincy, and is on its way to becoming a parish.

On August 8, 1989, Doña Conseelo S. Perez and Governor Rafael M. Colet, together with Archbishop Federico G. Limon and Mayor Douglas D. Soriano, unveiled the marker of the church.

In July 2022, Pope Francis designated the church a minor basilica, along with the Archdiocesan Shrine of Saint Anne in Taguig, Metro Manila. The church was solemnly designated the title on January 14, 2023, in a Mass presided by the apostolic nuncio to the Philippines, Archbishop Charles John Brown, concelebrated by Lingayen-Dagupan Archbishop Socrates Villegas, auxiliary bishop Fidelis Layog, and Fr. Gerard Francisco Timoner, the Master of the Order of Preachers.

== Architectural features ==
The church resembles a Baroque architectural style. The third and fourth levels form a large pediment with the raking cornice consisting of huge scrolls. The topmost level was painted with the picture of Saint Dominic. The middle segment gives contrast within the levels through the designs along its wall planes. The main bell of the Minor Basilica of Saint Dominic weighs more that 3,990 kilograms (4 tons) and measures 1.5m high, and produces sound with B2 key. It is dated 1815. An expert on church bells says that it might be the biggest bell and best sounding bell in Northern Luzon.

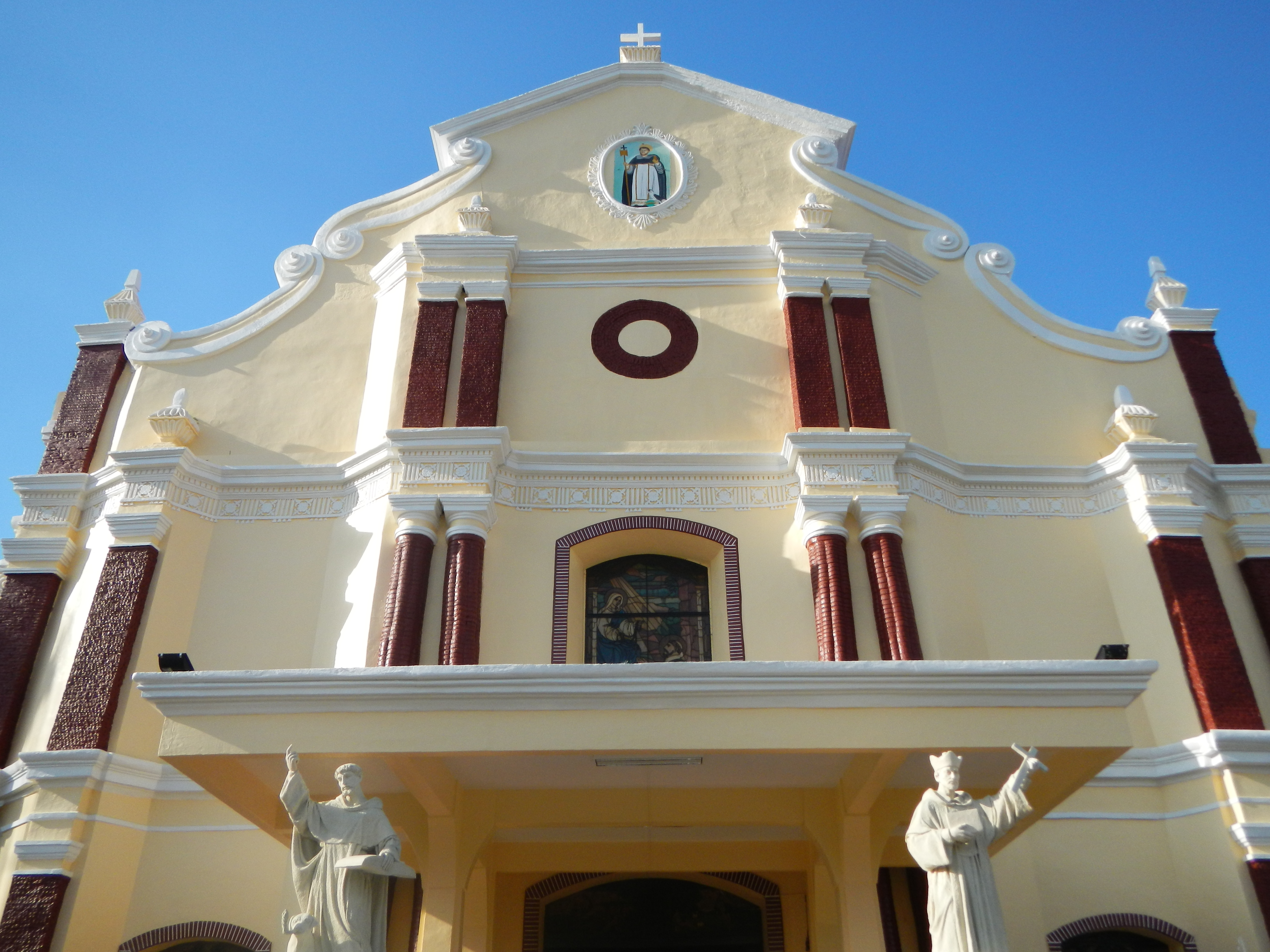
Main façade

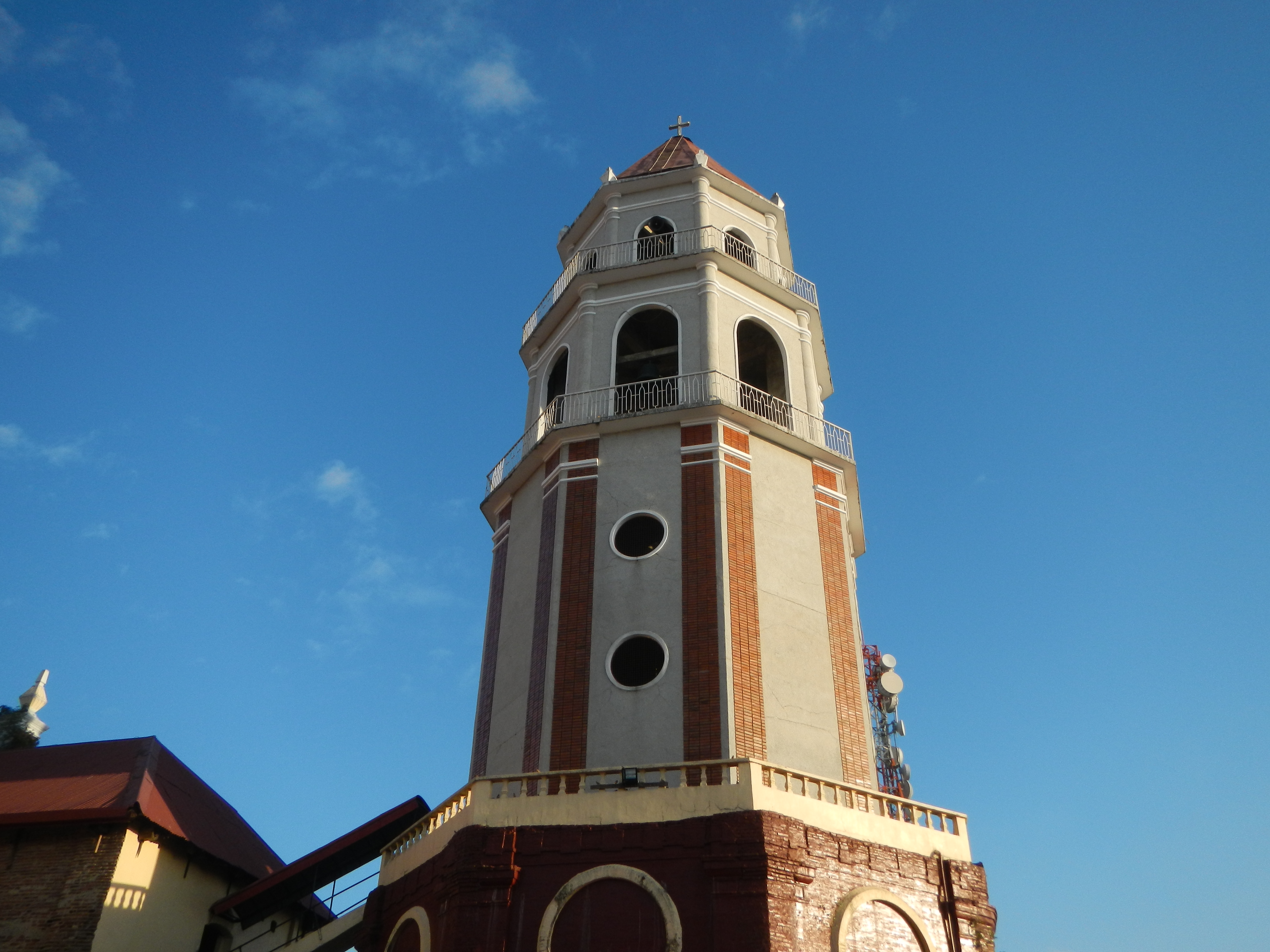
Bell tower

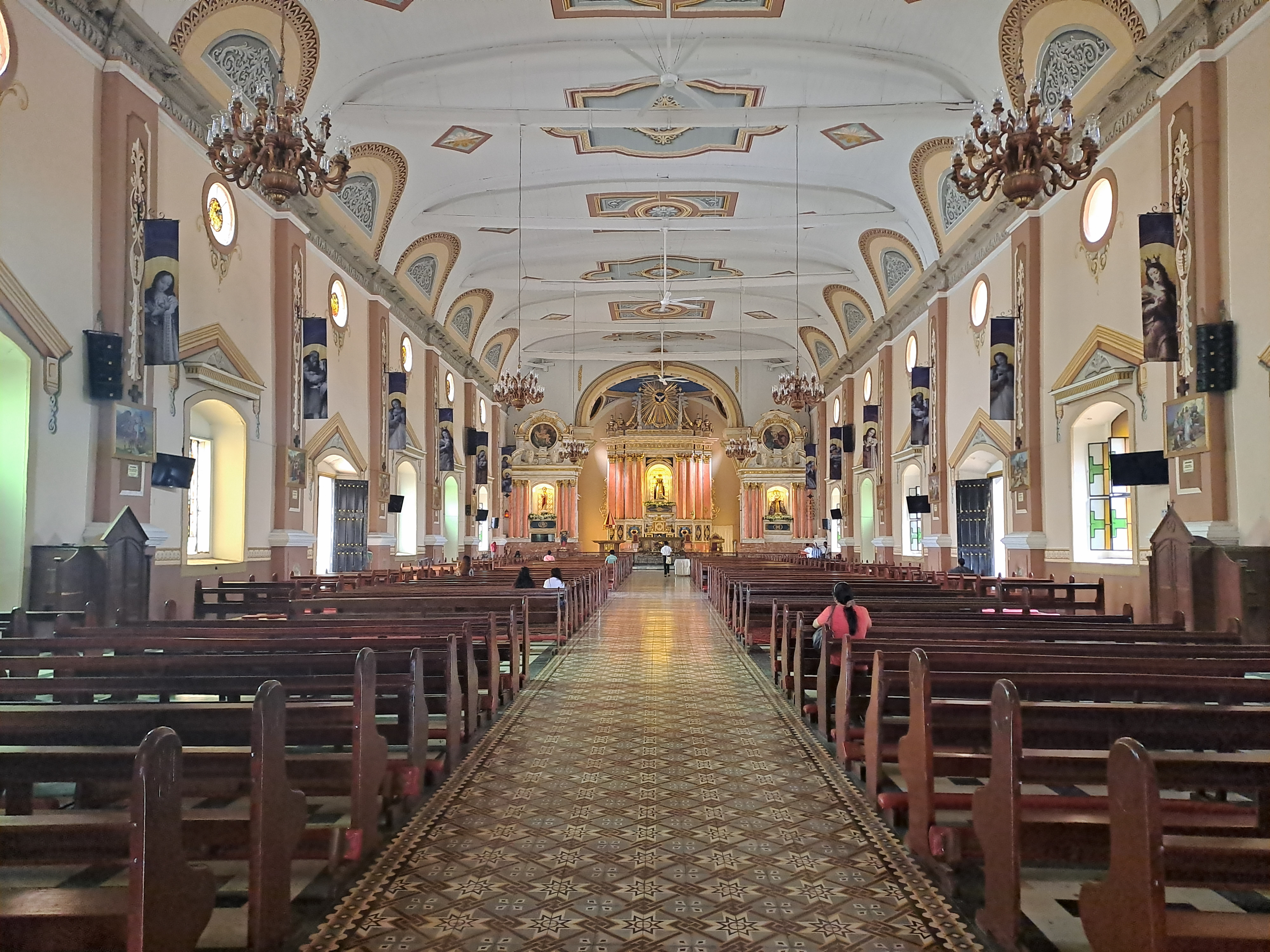
Church interior in 2023

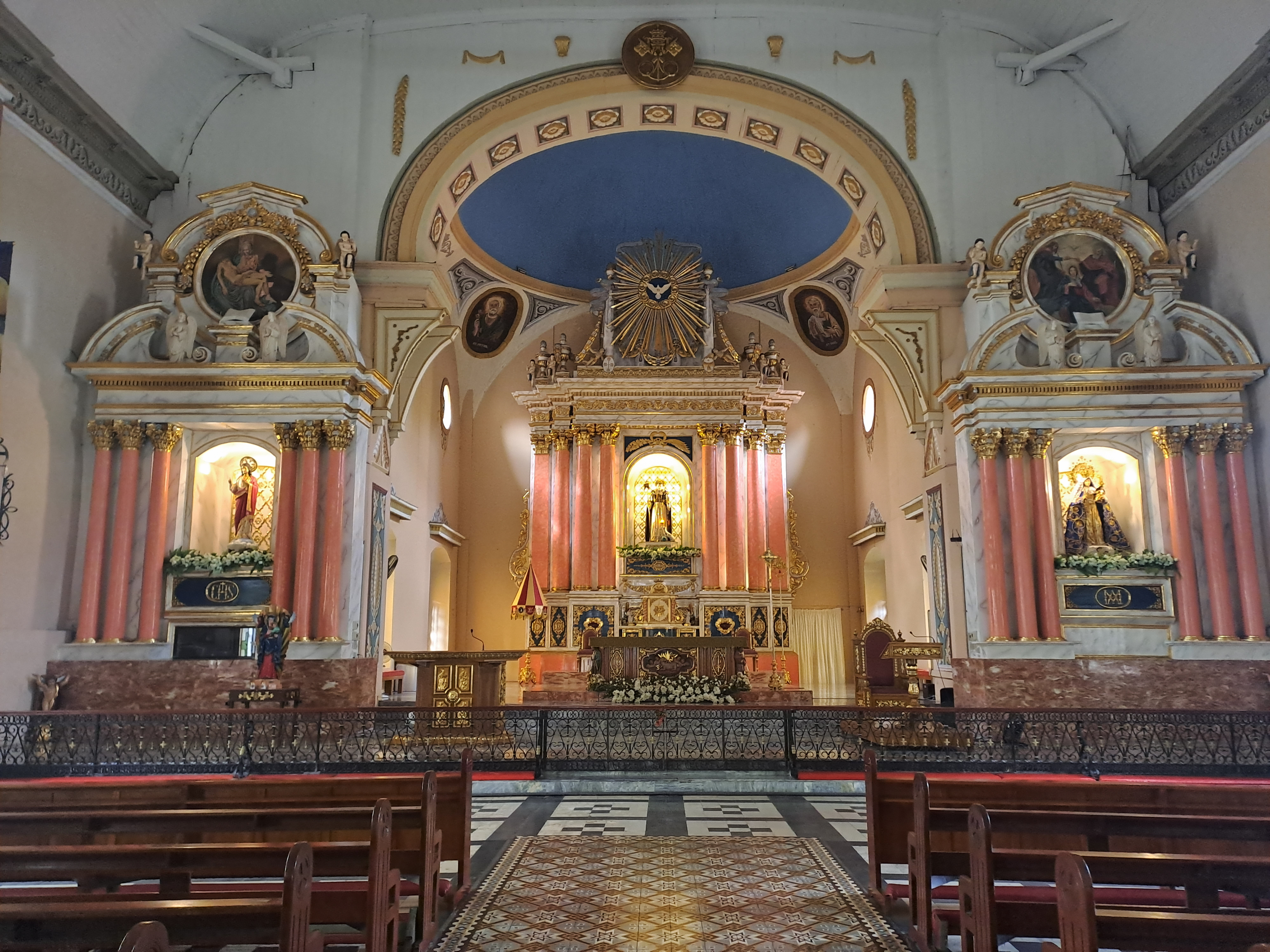
Church sanctuary
