= Santa Monica Parish Church (Sarrat) =

Roman Catholic church in Ilocos Norte, Philippines

Sarrat Church
- Santa Monica Parish Church
- Iglesia de Santa Mónica (Spanish)
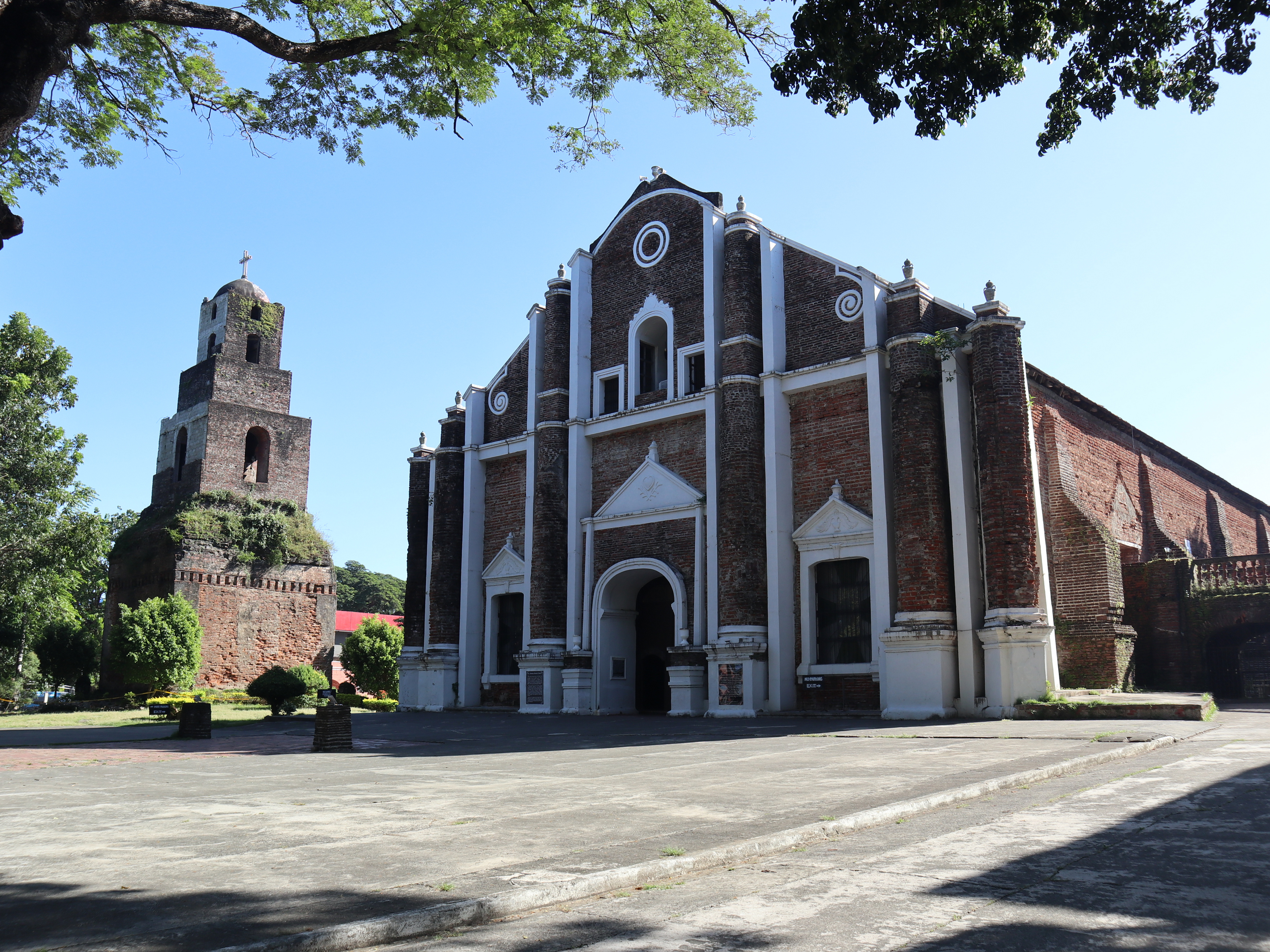
- The church and its bell tower in 2022

- Location in Luzon Location in the Philippines
- 18°09′21″N 120°38′41″E
- Location: Sarrat, Ilocos Norte
- Country: Philippines
- Denomination: Roman Catholic

History
- Status: Parish church
- Dedication: Saint Monica

Architecture
- Functional status: Active
- Heritage designation: Important Cultural Property
- Designated: 2009
- Architectural type: Church building
- Style: Earthquake Baroque and Neoclassical
- Groundbreaking: 1779

Specifications
- Length: 140 metres (460 ft)
- Width: 21 metres (69 ft)
- Height: 10.5 metres (34 ft)
- Materials: Bricks

Administration
- Province: Nueva Segovia
- Metropolis: Nueva Segovia
- Archdiocese: Nueva Segovia
- Diocese: Laoag

Clergy
- Archbishop: David William Antonio
- Bishop: Renato Mayugba

Santa Monica Parish Church, commonly known as Sarrat Church, is a Roman Catholic parish church in Barangay San Leandro, Poblacion, Sarrat, Ilocos Norte, Philippines. It was built in 1779 and was originally known as San Miguel Church. The Santa Monica Church complex includes the convent connected to the church by an elevated three-level brick stairway.

The parish church of Santa Monica is renowned as the largest church in Ilocos Norte, most especially the length of the nave. In June 1983, the church was the setting for the grand wedding of Gregorio Araneta and Irene Marcos, the daughter of President Ferdinand Marcos. It was declared as an Important Cultural Property by the National Museum of the Philippines on September 27, 2009.

== History ==
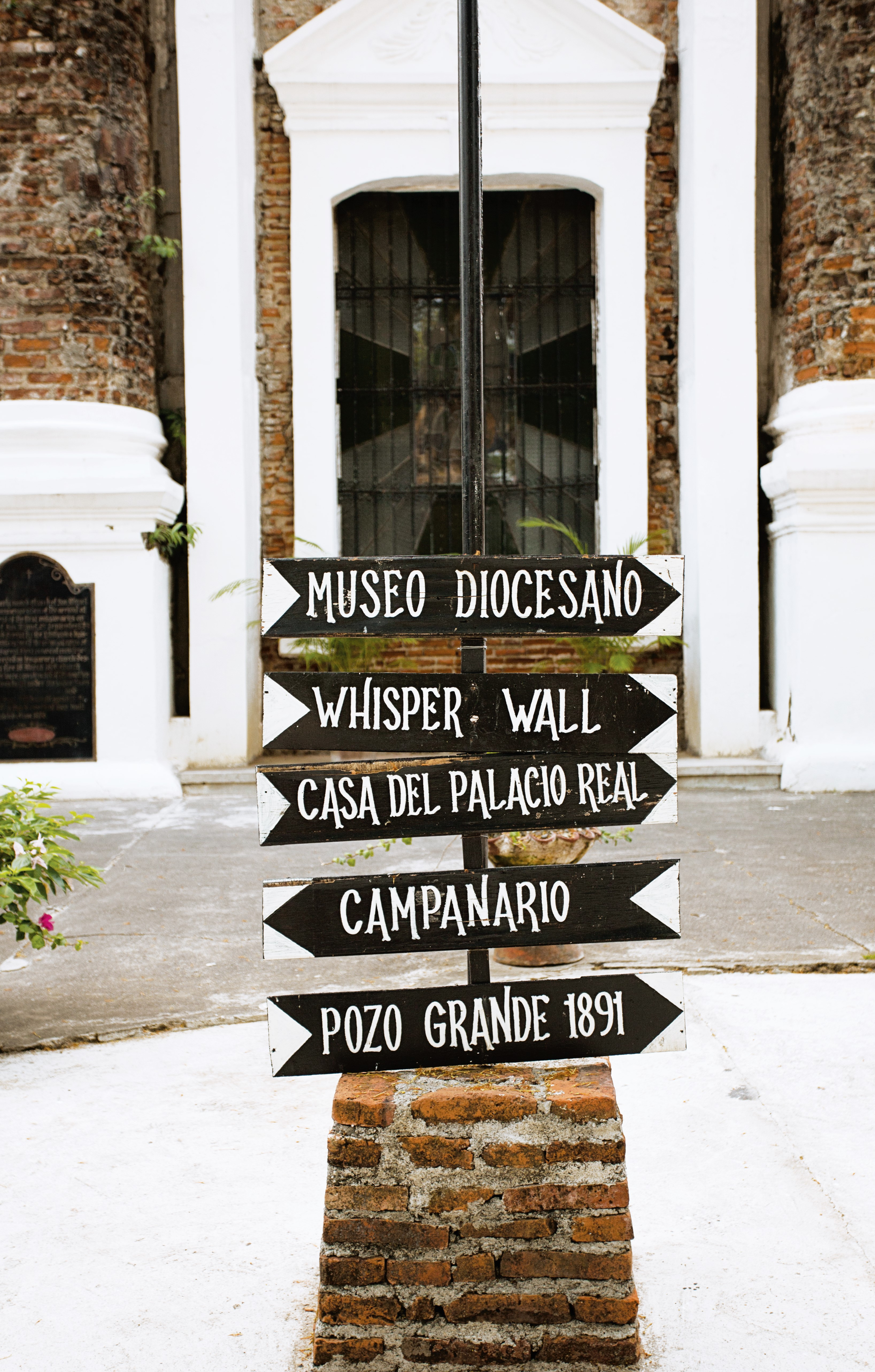
Museo Diocesano at Sarrat Church

Sarrat used to be a visita of Laoag. It was originally named as San Miguel to mark the arrival of the first Augustinian missionaries in Sarrat during the feast of Saint Michael the Archangel on September 29, 1724. The parish of Santa Monica de Sarrat was erected in 1724. It was only in 1769 when the convent was built to serve as a temporary chapel. The church, belfry, convent, and the curillo or bridge staircase connecting the church and convent was simultaneously constructed and finished in 1779.

On March 3, 1816, the church was destroyed with just a few jewels saved by the Father Juan Casas. Father Vicente Barreiro, who was the prior in 1818, worked for five years and finished the reconstruction of the convent in 1817. Father Isidro Champaner rebuilt the church in 1848. The church buildings burned again in 1882 and were repaired by Father Leandro Collado during his long assignment from 1875 to 1895.

During the 1950s, Father Clemente Tabije supervised the reinforcement of the roof by putting massive posts inside. First Lady Imelda Marcos spearheaded restoration work for the church in June 1977. A few months after the wedding of Irene Marcos and Gregorio Araneta, on August 17, 1983, a devastating earthquake hit the province of Ilocos Norte which recorded a magnitude of 5.3 (MI) on the Richter scale and an intensity 7 on the Rossi-Forel scale. The tremor caused major structural damage to the church's facade, as well as the toppling down of the bell tower. The church underwent restoration and repair after the earthquake.

The church was again damaged by a magnitude 5.6 earthquake on December 30, 2024.

== Architecture ==
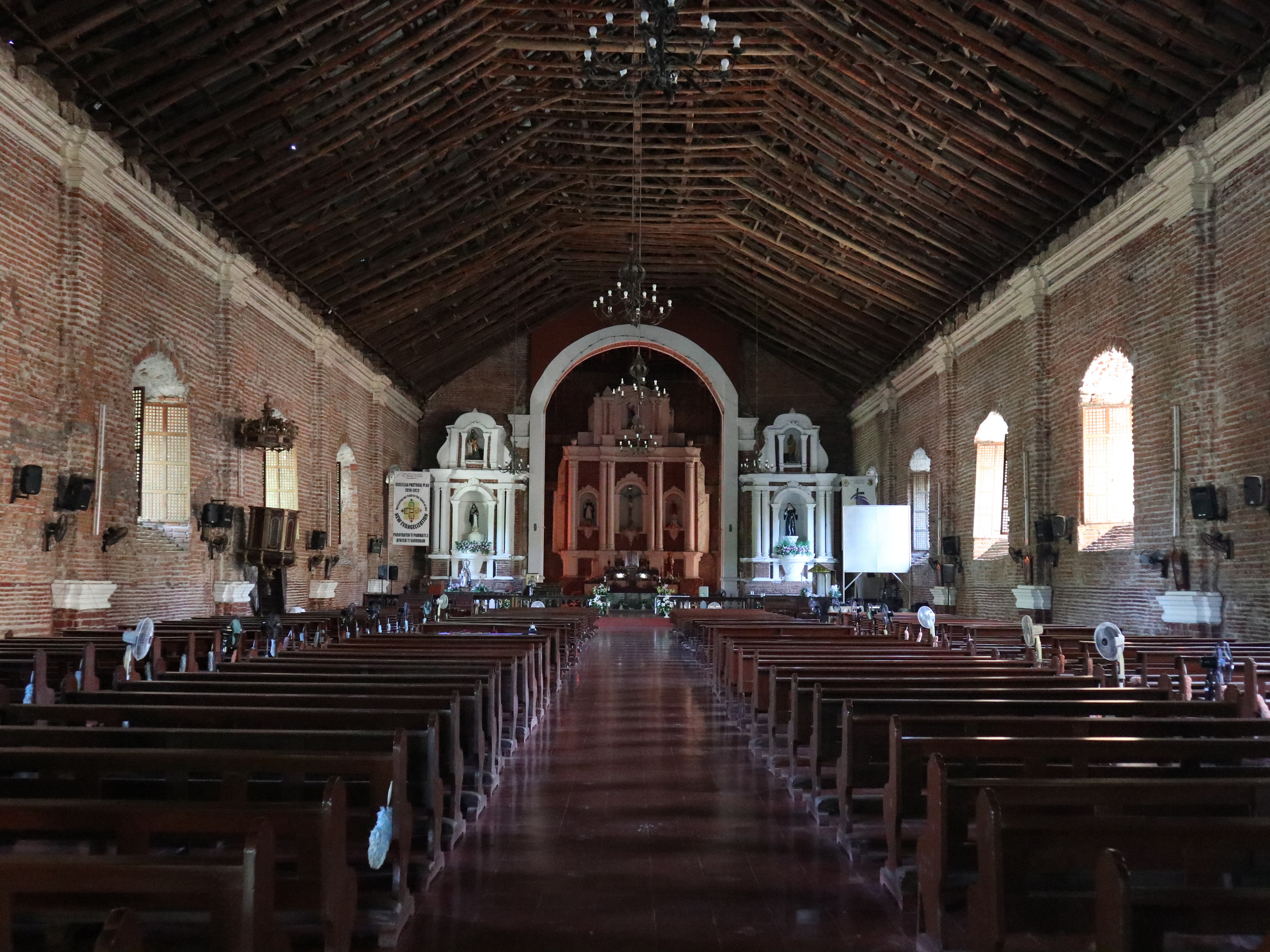
Church interior in 2022

Sarrat Church is the biggest in Ilocos Norte and possibly in the Ilocos region. The church is made from red bricks built in Earthquake Baroque and Neoclassical architecture. The church tower has a big clock that strikes every half-hour. Around the church are brick fourteen Stations of the Cross. The convent, also known as Casa del Palacio Real, was rebuilt after two fires in March 1816 and October 1892. It served as the Presidencia Municipal or present-day town hall. It also housed Colegio de Santa Monica, an affiliate of Lyceo de Manila. The ground floor of the convent was converted as the parish museum and photo gallery in 1994.

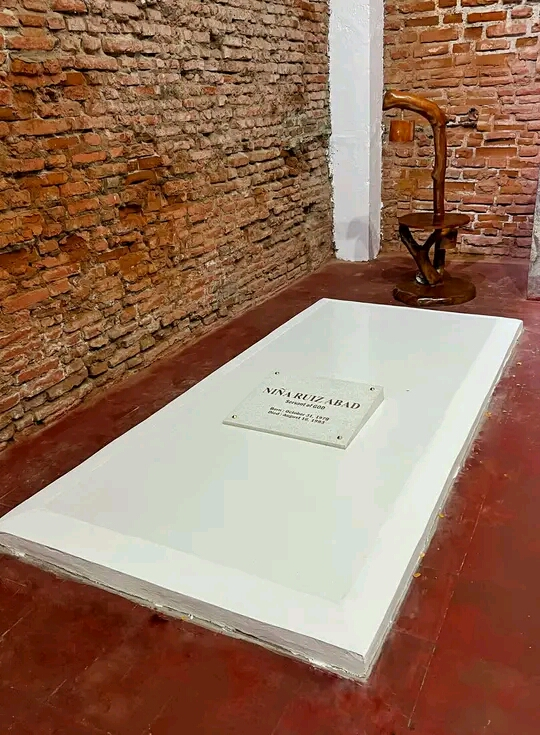
Tomb of Niña Ruiz Abad

== Other burials ==
- Niña Ruiz Abad- (October 31, 1979 – August 16, 1993) a young Filipino girl, who is venerated as a Servant of God in the Roman Catholic Church.

== In popular culture ==
The church was the venue of the grand wedding of Irene Marcos, daughter of President Ferdinand Marcos, and Gregorio Araneta in June 1983. A longer and wider choir loft was added for the wedding. The church garden was renovated to serve as the venue for the reception.

The church appears in the 2015 period biopic Heneral Luna as the stand-in for the parish church of Arayat, Pampanga.

== Bibliography ==
- Dela Torre, Visitacion (2006). The Ilocos Heritage. Makati City: Tower Book House. ISBN 978-971-91030-9-7.
- Galende, Pedro, O.S.A. (1987). Angels in Stone (1st ed.). G.A. Formoso Publishing. pp. 345–347.
