= SNHS =

SNHS may refer to:

- Science National Honor Society, an American high school honor society

== Schools ==
- St Ninian's High School (disambiguation)
- Salendine Nook High School, Huddersfield, West Yorkshire, England
- Sarrat National High School, Sarrat, Ilocos Norte, Philippines
- Southern Nash High School, Bailey, North Carolina, United States
