= Niña Ruiz Abad =

Filipina Servant of God

Servant of God Niña Ruiz Abad
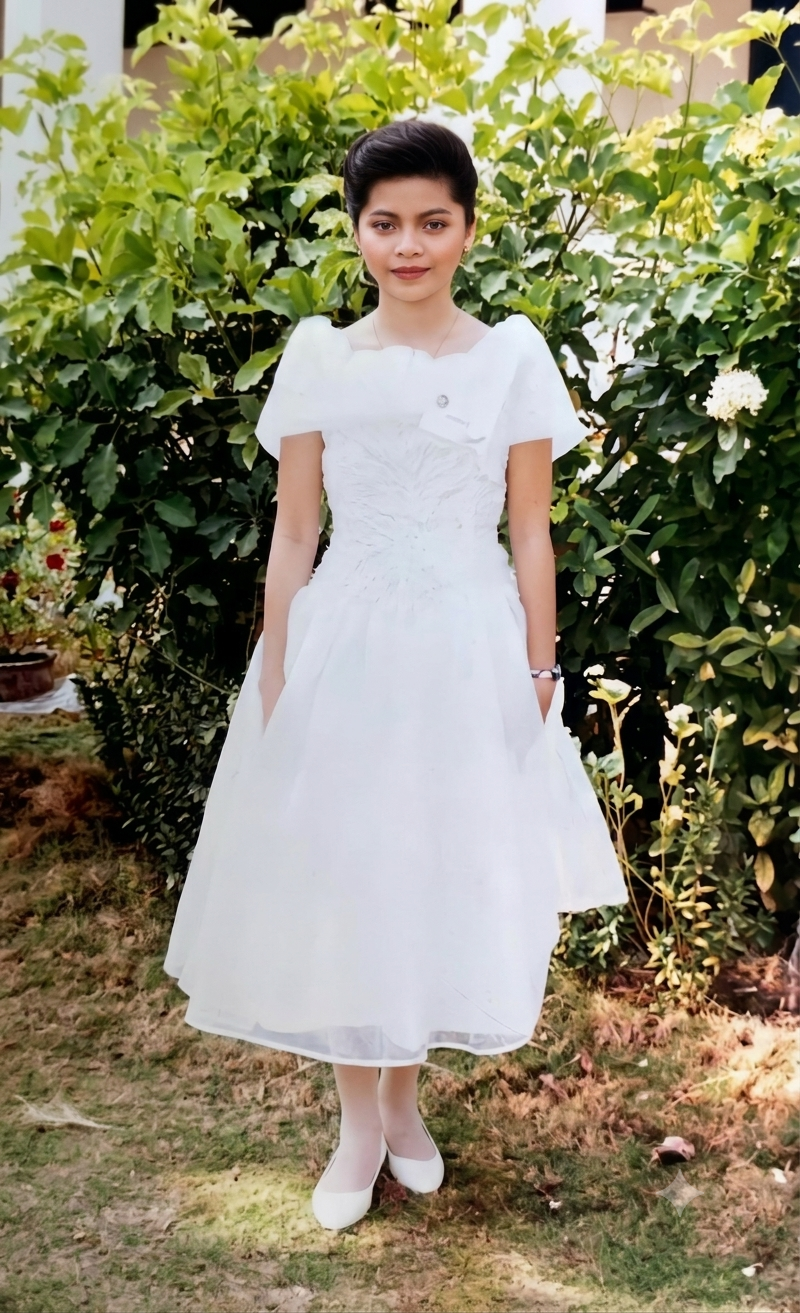
- Photograph of Niña Ruiz Abad
- Born: October 31, 1979; Quezon City, Philippines
- Died: August 16, 1993 (aged 13); Quezon City, Philippines
- Cause of death: Heart attack
- Resting place: Sarrat Public Cemetery, Sarrat, Ilocos Norte (1993–2024); Church of Santa Monica, Sarrat, Ilocos Norte (2024–present)

Niña Ruiz Abad (October 31, 1979 – August 16, 1993) was a Filipino Catholic girl widely known as "the girl who always wore a rosary". A beatification process for her was opened, and Ruiz Abad is therefore called a Servant of God.

== Biography ==
Abad was born October 31, 1979, at Capitol Medical Center in Quezon City to a lawyer couple from Sarrat, but her father died when she was three years old. She was baptized at Santo Domingo Church on March 15, 1980. She had one sister.

She attended nursery at the University of the Philippines Child Study Center in Diliman, Quezon City, and kindergarten to grade two at the Holy Angels Montessori School in the same city. In April 1988, her family transferred to Sarrat, Ilocos Norte, where her mother, Corazon Ruiz Abad, a lawyer, became the chief hearing officer of the Commission on the Settlement of Land Problems of the Department of Justice. She completed her elementary education at Mariano Marcos State University Laboratory Elementary School as a top student. She later spent her high school at the Mariano Marcos State University Laboratory High School and, one year later, at the School of the Holy Spirit in Quezon City.

=== Spiritual life ===
Abad was described as having "a strong devotion to the Eucharist and devoted her life to distributing rosaries, Bibles, prayer books, holy images, and other religious items". Because of her strong Catholic faith, which she earned from her pious mother, she became an inspiration to numerous people in Ilocos Norte and Quezon City. Bishop Mayugba emphasized Abad's popularity for her faith, saying

"If one asks, 'Do you know Niña Ruiz Abad?' The answer would be, 'That's the girl who always wore a rosary. The girl who loved to pray. The girl who loves God so much'."

In 1989, Abad was diagnosed with hypertrophic cardiomyopathy. On August 16, 1993, she had a heart attack while at school. She was rushed immediately to the hospital where she eventually died. Her remains were buried in Sarrat Public Cemetery. On April 6, 2024, her remains were exhumed and transferred to the baptistery at Santa Monica Church in Sarrat. Her tomb was opened to the public on April 17, 2024.

== Beatification process ==
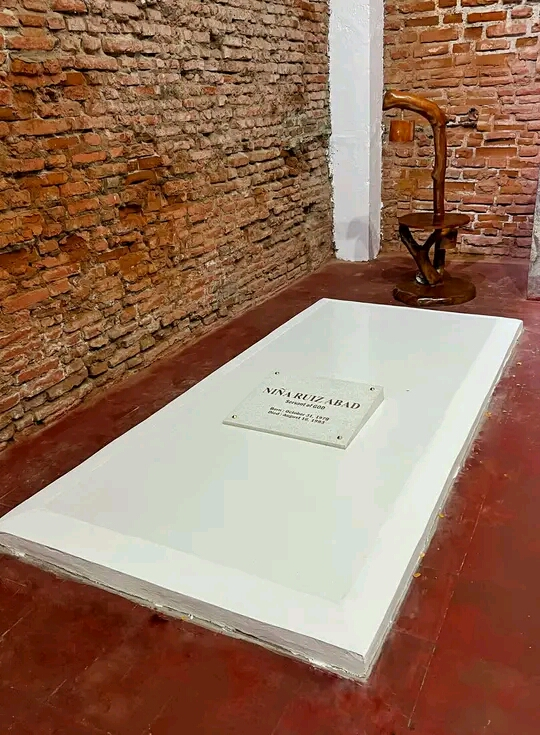
Tomb of the Servant of God Niña Ruiz Abad in the baptistery at Santa Monica Church, Sarrat, Ilocos Norte, Philippines.

Three decades after her death and with the approval of Catholic Bishops' Conference of the Philippines (CBCP), Bishop Renato Mayugba of Laoag initiated the opening of the beatification process for Abad noting that she could serve as a "good model of piety and fortitude" for modern Filipino youth. Mayugba obtained the approval of Bishop Roberto Gaa for the transfer of the competent forum to the Laoag diocese, which was also approved by the Congregation for the Causes of Saints.

On March 10, 2024, the Dicastery for the Causes of Saints permitted the opening of Abad's cause. The grant of the nihil obstat is among stages in the preliminary phase of a cause, the Catholic Bishops Conference of the Philippines explained.

On April 7, 2024, Mayugba with the postulator, Dennis Duene Ruíz, OAD, led the opening session of the diocesan tribunal's official and public inquiry, at Laoag Cathedral on the beatification process. Niña’s mother, sister, cousin broadcast journalist Jay Ruiz, relatives and God First Association members witnessed the "video reenactment of Abad’s life and the unveiling of her official portrait", the CBCP said. Mayugba designated Noel Ian Rabago as episcopal delegate, Englebert B. Elarmo as promoter of justice, and Rey Magus Respicio as notary.
