= El-Kentour =

El-Kentour (الكنتور) is a town and mountain in Algeria. It is located in the Constantine Mountains. El-Kentour is also the site of the El-Ouahch to El-Kentour tunnel, which is part of the National Road 3.

== Location ==
El-Kentour is situated 3 km south of Aïn Bouziane and 4½ km north of Zighoud Youcef. The topography is mountainous, with the Oued Ensa flowing to the east. The boundary between Skikda and Constantine Province runs through the village.

== History ==
In Roman and Vandal times the town was known as Centuriones.

=== Bishopric ===
The town was the seat of an ancient Bishopric and was from the 4th to the 6th century a stronghold of Donatism. The Bishopric remains today a titular see of the Catholic Church, and the current bishop is Vasyl Tuchapets. Known bishops include:

Titular bishops

- Vasyl Volodymyr Tuchapets since 2012, Ukrainian Catholic Archiepiscopal Exarch of Kharkiv
- Renato Mayugba (2005–2012), auxiliary bishop of Lingayen–Dagupan, Philippines
- Kiro Stojanov (1999–2005), auxiliary bishop of Skopje
- Alberto Trevisan (1964–1998), auxiliary bishop of the Military Ordinariate of Brazil (1964–1967), auxiliary bishop of São Sebastião do Rio de Janeiro (1967–1973)

Residing bishops

- Firmianus Catholic bishop fl.484.
- Ianuarius Donatist bishop fl411.
- Nabor of Centurio, attendee of Council of Cirta fl303-305.
