= Jacinto Jose =

Filippino Roman-Catholic bishop (born 1950)

Most Reverend Jacinto Jose D.D.
- Bishop Emeritus of Urdaneta
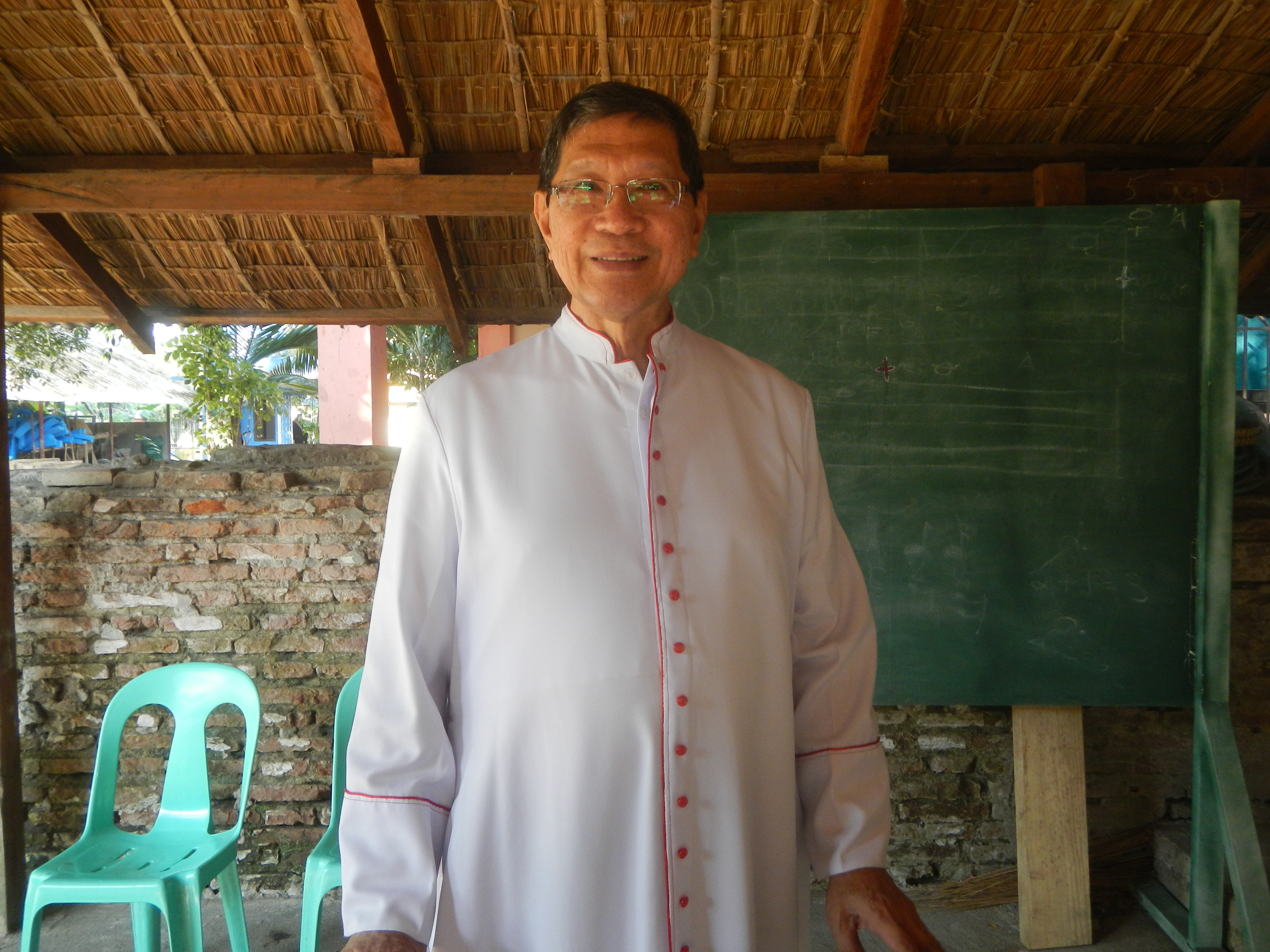
- Province: Lingayen-Dagupan
- See: Urdaneta
- Appointed: September 21, 2005
- Installed: November 26, 2005
- Term ended: May 3, 2026
- Predecessor: Jesús Castro Galang
- Successor: Nick Argel Vaquilar

Orders
- Ordination: June 29, 1975
- Consecration: November 26, 2005 by Antonio Franco

Personal details
- Born: Jacinto Agcaoili Jose; October 29, 1950 (age 75) Laoag City, Philippines
- Denomination: Roman Catholic
- Residence: Urdaneta City, Pangasinan
- Education: University of Santo Tomas, Northern Christian College, Angelicum
- Motto: "Servus Tuus in Aeternum"
- Coat of arms

Styles of Jacinto Jose
- Reference style: His Excellency; The Most Reverend
- Spoken style: Your Excellency
- Religious style: Bishop

Jacinto Agcaoili Jose (born October 29, 1950) is a Filipino bishop of the Roman Catholic Church who has been serving as the Bishop of the Diocese of Urdaneta since 2005. Before his episcopal appointment, he was the Diocesan Administrator of the Laoag.

== Early life and education ==
Jacinto Jose was born on October 29, 1950, in Laoag City, Ilocos Norte. He completed his primary education at Apaya Elementary School in Mangato, Laoag City in 1961. He finished his secondary education at St. Mary's Seminary in Laoag in 1967 before continuing his Philosophy studies at the Immaculate Conception Major Seminary in Vigan and finishing it in 1970. He later pursued a Licentiate in Sacred Theology at the University of Santo Tomas in Manila. He took Masters of Arts in School Administration from Northern Christian College in Laoag City. He then pursued specialized studies in Canon Law at the Pontifical University of Saint Thomas Aquinas in Rome from 1983 to 1985.

== Priesthood ==
On June 29, 1975, he was ordained to the priesthood in Rome by Pope Paul VI as part of the celebrations for the Jubilee Year. Following his ordination, he served as Prefect of Discipline and later became Rector of the Minor Seminary of Laoag.

Upon returning to the Philippines from his further study in Rome, he was appointed as a professor at the Major Seminary of Nueva Segovia in Vigan. He later became its rector, holding the position from 1985 to 1990. Afterward, he served for a brief period as rector of the St. Mary's Seminary in Laoag. He was later assigned as a parish priest in different locations, including St. John Sahagun Parish in Burgos, Ilocos Norte, Santa Monica Parish in Sarrat, and St. William Cathedral in Laoag. His leadership extended beyond parish work when he was elected as the Diocesan Administrator of the Diocese of Laoag on June 7, 2005.

== Episcopal ministry ==
On September 21, 2005, Pope Benedict XVI appointed Jose as the Bishop of Urdaneta. He received episcopal consecration on November 26, 2005, with then Apostolic Nuncio to the Philippines, Archbishop Antonio Franco, serving as the principal consecrator.

Within the Catholic Bishops' Conference of the Philippines (CBCP), Bishop Jose served as vice chairman of the Commission on Communications and Mass Media from 2009 to 2013. He subsequently held the position of vice chairman of the Commission on Canon Law from 2013 to 2015, and was later appointed chairman of the same commission, a role he held from 2015 to 2021.

Pope Leo XIV accepted his resignation on May 3, 2026, and appointed Nick Vaquilar as his successor.

Catholic Church titles
Preceded by Jesús Castro Galang	Bishop of Urdaneta; November 26, 2005 – May 3, 2026	Succeeded by Nick Argel Vaquilar
