= Vasyl Tuchapets =

Ukrainian Greek Catholic archiepiscopal exarch

Vasyl Tuchapets, O.S.B.M.
- Archiepiscopal Exarch of Ukrainian Catholic Archiepiscopal Exarchate of Kharkiv
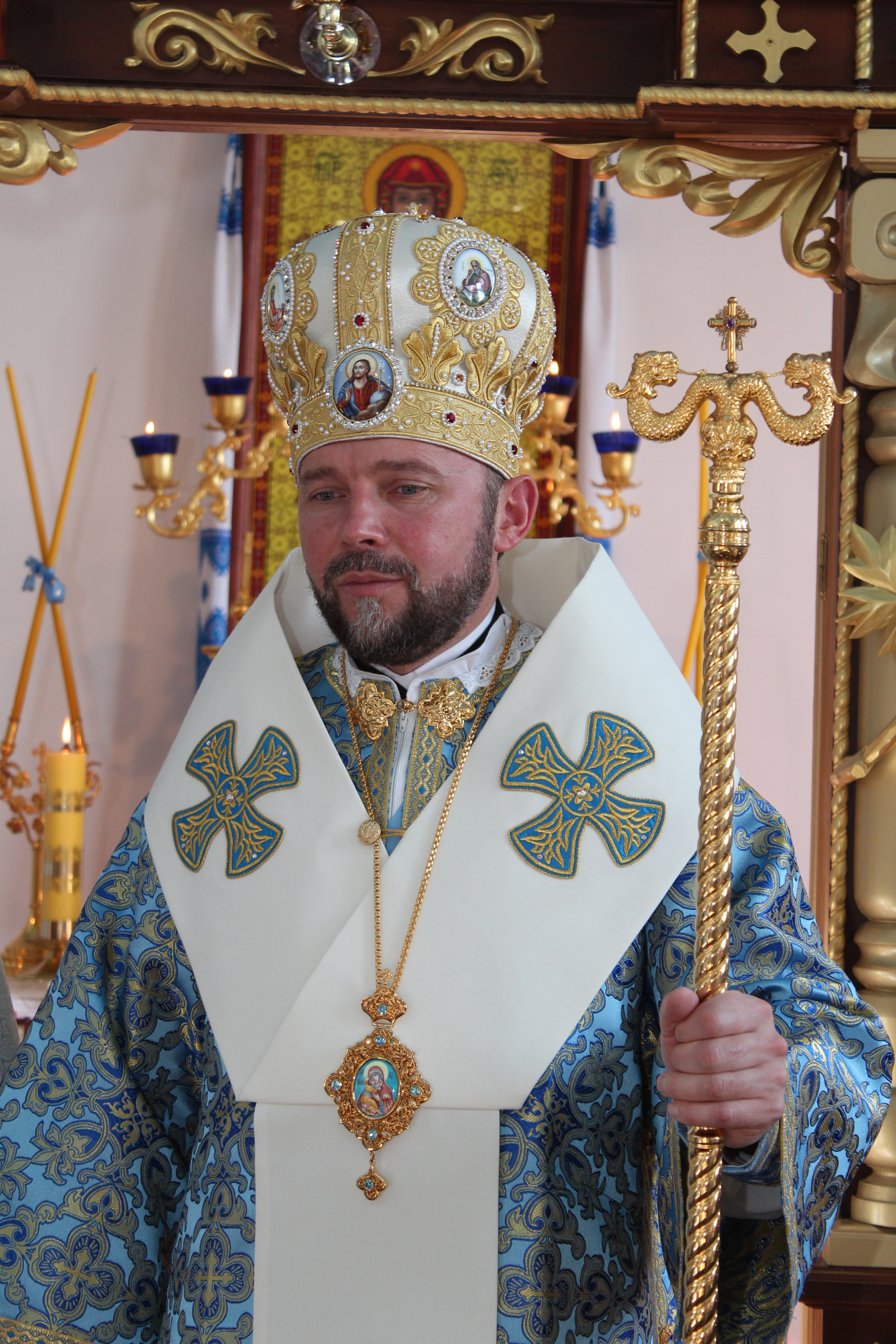
- Church: Ukrainian Greek Catholic Church
- Appointed: 2 April 2014
- Predecessor: New Creation
- Successor: Incumbent
- Other post: Titular Bishop of Centuriones (since 2014)

Orders
- Ordination: 12 July 1997 (Priest) by Sofron Dmyterko
- Consecration: 21 May 2014 (Bishop) by Sviatoslav Shevchuk

Personal details
- Born: Volodymyr Vasylyovych Tuchapets; 29 September 1967 (age 59) Yavoriv, Lviv Oblast, Ukrainian SSR

Vasyl Volodymyr Tuchapets OSBM (Ukrainian: Василь Володимир Тучапець; born 29 September 1967 in Yavoriv, Lviv Oblast, Ukrainian SSR) is a Ukrainian Greek Catholic hierarch as an Archiepiscopal Exarch of Ukrainian Catholic Archiepiscopal Exarchate of Kharkiv and Titular Bishop of Centuriones since 2 April 2014.

== Life ==
Vasyl Volodymyr Tuchapets was born in the family of Vasyl and Kateryna (née Datsko) Tuchapets in Yavoriv, where he grew up. After graduation of the school education, he graduated the technical college #14 in Ivano-Frankivsk (1982–1986) and made a compulsory service in the Soviet Army (1986–1988). He also studied an architecture in the Lviv Polytechnic (1988–1990). After graduation of the school education he joined a clandestine theological seminary.

During all this time he was a clandestine member of the Order of Saint Basil the Great from 10 November 1986, where he had a profession on 6 October 1991 and a solemn profession on 29 December 1996. Tuchapets was ordained as priest on 12 July 1997 after completing theological studies in Pontifical Theological Faculty in Warsaw (1991–1997). Then he continued his studies with a licentiate degree in patrology.

After returning from studies in Poland, he had a various pastoral assignments and served as professor, superior and rector at the Basilian Institutes in Ukraine. And during 2005-2014 he was a superior of the Basilian monastery in Kyiv.

On 2 April 2014 Tucapets was appointed, and on 21 May 2014 was consecrated to the Episcopate as the first Archiepiscopal Exarch of the new created Ukrainian Catholic Archiepiscopal Exarchate of Kharkiv and the Titular Bishop of Centuriones. The principal consecrator was Sviatoslav Shevchuk, the Head of the Ukrainian Greek Catholic Church.

Catholic Church titles
Preceded by Renato Pine Mayugba	Titular Bishop of Centuriones; 2014–present	Succeeded by Incumbent
New title	Archiepiscopal Exarch of Kharkiv; 2014–present	Succeeded by Incumbent
