= Nick Vaquilar =

Filippino Roman-Catholic priest (born 1970)

His Excellency, The Most Reverend Nick Vaquilar S.Th.D.
- Bishop of Urdaneta
- Province: Lingayen–Dagupan
- See: Urdaneta
- Appointed: May 3, 2026
- Installed: July 28, 2026
- Predecessor: Jacinto A. Jose

Orders
- Ordination: May 5, 1997 by Orlando B. Quevedo
- Consecration: July 21, 2026 by Orlando B. Quevedo

Personal details
- Born: Nick Argel Vaquilar; May 3, 1970 (age 56) Lapog, Ilocos Sur, Philippines
- Denomination: Catholic
- Education: San Pablo Major Seminary (BA); Immaculate Conception School of Theology (MA); Pontifical Gregorian University (Th.L.); Loyola School of Theology (S.Th.D.)
- Motto: Domine, Tuus Sum (Latin for 'Lord, I am Yours' – Psalm 119:94)
- Coat of arms: Nick Vaquilar's coat of arms

Ordination history
History
Priestly ordination
- Ordained by: Orlando B. Quevedo
Episcopal consecration
- Principal consecrator: Orlando B. Quevedo
- Co-consecrators: Marlo Mendoza Peralta; Jacinto Agcaoili Jose
- Styles
- Reference style: His Excellency; The Most Reverend
- Spoken style: Your Excellency
- Religious style: Bishop

Nick Argel Vaquilar (born May 3, 1970) is a Filipino Catholic prelate who is currently the Bishop of the Diocese of Urdaneta.

== Early life ==
Vaquilar was born on May 3, 1970. Vaquilar spent his formation years as a seminarian at the San Pablo Major Seminary in Baguio City, where he obtained his Bachelor of Arts degree in philosophy.

He then continued his theological studies at the Immaculate Conception School of Theology (ICST), where he attended from 1992 to 1996.

== Ministry ==
=== Priesthood ===
Vaquilar was ordained a priest on May 5, 1997, at a local chapel in Guimod, San Juan, Ilocos Sur, by then Archbishop of Nueva Segovia Cardinal Orlando B. Quevedo.

Vaquilar went to pursue a licentiate in biblical theology at the Pontifical Gregorian University in Rome, from 2001 to 2004. After his return from higher theological studies, Vaquilar resumed teaching at the same seminary he spent his theological studies at, and later then became as the seminary's procurator and overseer of seminarian formation and welfare.

He studied and finished his doctorate in sacred theology at the Loyola School of Theology of the Ateneo de Manila University in 2016, where he defended his dissertation entitled "Reading the Book of Ecclesiastes Ethically" in 2015, under the academic supervision of Dr. Helen Graham.

He has served as the rector of the Immaculate Conception School of Theology, until his appointment to the episcopate in May 2026.

=== Episcopate ===
Pope Leo XIV appointed Fr. Vaquilar as the fourth Bishop of Urdaneta on May 3, 2026, succeeding Bishop Jacinto Jose, whose resignation was accepted and approved on the same day.

== See also ==
- Roman Catholic Diocese of Urdaneta
- List of Catholic Bishops in the Philippines

Catholic Church titles
Preceded by Jacinto Agcaoili Jose	Bishop of Urdaneta; July 28, 2026 – present	Incumbent
