= Ernesto Salgado =

Philippine theologian (born 1936)

The Most Reverend Ernesto Antolin Salgado D.D.
- Metropolitan Archbishop Emeritus of Nueva Segovia
- Province: Nueva Segovia
- See: Nueva Segovia
- Appointed: February 12, 2005
- Installed: May 31, 2005
- Retired: April 2, 2014
- Predecessor: Edmundo M. Abaya
- Successor: Marlo Mendoza Peralta
- Other posts: Bishop of Laoag (2000–2005); Vicar Apostolic of Baguio (1992–2000); Vicar Apostolic of the Mountain Provinces (1987–1992)

Orders
- Ordination: December 23, 1961 by Manuel Porcia Yap
- Consecration: March 11, 1987 by Bruno Torpigliani

Personal details
- Born: Ernesto Antolin Salgado; November 22, 1936 (age 89) Santa Lucia, Ilocos Sur, Philippines
- Denomination: Roman Catholic
- Residence: Vigan, Ilocos Sur, Philippines
- Education: University of Santo Tomas; Pontifical Gregorian University
- Motto: "Pro Populo Consecratus" (Consecrated for the People)
- Coat of arms

Styles of Ernesto Salgado
- Reference style: His Excellency; The Most Reverend
- Spoken style: Your Excellency
- Religious style: Archbishop

Ernesto Antolin Salgado (born November 22, 1936) is a Filipino bishop of the Catholic Church who served as the archbishop of Nueva Segovia from 2005 to 2014. Prior to his appointment, he served as the bishop of Laoag and Vicar Apostolic of Baguio and its predecessor Vicariate Apostolic of Mountain Provinces (Montagnosa).

== Early life and education ==
Salgado was born in Santa Lucia, Ilocos Sur, on November 22, 1936. He completed his secondary education at the Immaculate Conception Minor Seminary and his Philosophy studies at Immaculate Conception School of Theology. He obtained a degree in theology in 1962 and a licentiate in Sacred Theology at the University of Santo Tomas. In 1978, he earned a Doctorate in Sacred Theology from the Pontifical Gregorian University in Rome.

== Priesthood ==
Salgado was ordained a priest on December 23, 1961. After ordination, he served as prefect of discipline and spiritual director at the Minor Seminary of Vigan from 1962 to 1970. In 1970, he was appointed rector of the same seminary, a position he held until 1973. Following this, he was assigned as parish priest of the Cathedral of Nueva Segovia from 1973 to 1974.

In 1978, after completing his doctoral studies in Rome, Salgado returned to the Philippines and served as vice rector, professor of moral theology, and later spiritual director of the Major Seminary of Vigan until 1987. His pastoral and academic contributions during this period helped shape many future clergy in the Archdiocese of Nueva Segovia.

== Episcopal ministry ==
On October 17, 1986, Pope John Paul II appointed Salgado as the titular bishop of Buruni and coadjutor vicar apostolic of the Mountain Provinces. He was consecrated bishop on January 15, 1987, by Archbishop Bruno Torpigliani. He succeeded as Vicar Apostolic of Mountain Provinces on December 18, 1987.

=== Bishop of Baguio and Laoag ===
On July 6, 1992, he became the first vicar apostolic of the newly renamed Apostolic Vicariate of Baguio, after the vicariate ceded territories to form the Apostolic Vicariate of Bontoc-Lagawe and the Apostolic Vicariate of Tabuk. On December 7, 2000, he was appointed as the bishop of Laoag.

=== Archbishop of Nueva Segovia ===
On February 12, 2005, Pope John Paul II appointed Salgado as the archbishop of Nueva Segovia. He was installed on May 31, 2005. He served until his retirement on April 2, 2014, and was succeeded by Archbishop Marlo Mendoza Peralta.

== Later life and advocacy ==
As archbishop emeritus, Salgado continued his advocacy for the sainthood cause of Bishop Alfredo Verzosa, the first Catholic bishop from Ilocos Sur.

Catholic Church titles
Preceded by Edmundo M. Abaya	Archbishop of Nueva Segovia; May 31, 2005 – April 2, 2014	Succeeded by Marlo Mendoza Peralta
Preceded by Edmundo M. Abaya	Bishop of Laoag; December 7, 2000 – May 31, 2005	Succeeded by Sergio Lasam Utleg
New title	Vicar Apostolic of Baguio; July 6, 1992 – December 7, 2000	Succeeded by Carlito Joaquin Cenzon
Preceded by Emiliano Kulhi Madangeng	Vicar Apostolic of Mountain Province (Montañosa); December 18, 1987 – July 6, 1992; Coadjutor: January 15 – December 18, 1987	Succeeded by Himself as Vicar Apostolic of Baguio
Preceded by Pius Anthony Benincasa	— TITULAR — Bishop of Buruni; January 15, 1987 – December 7, 2000	Succeeded by Ismael Rueda Sierra
