= Edmundo Abaya =

Filipino Catholic archbishop (1929–2018)

- Archbishop of Nueva Segovia
- Church: Catholic Church
- Archdiocese: Archdiocese of Nueva Segovia
- In office: 22 May 1999 – 12 February 2005
- Predecessor: Orlando Quevedo
- Successor: Ernesto Salgado
- Previous post: Bishop of Laoag (1978-1999)

Orders
- Ordination: 21 March 1953
- Consecration: 19 January 1979 by Bruno Torpigliani

Personal details
- Born: Edmundo Madarang Abaya; 19 January 1929 Candon, Ilocos Sur, Philippine Insular Government, United States
- Died: 20 September 2018 (aged 89) San Juan, National Capital Region, Philippines

Edmundo Madarang Abaya (19 January 1929 – 20 September 2018) was a Filipino Catholic archbishop. He served as a priest from 1953 until 1978, when he was the bishop of Laoag. He was appointed as the archbishop of Nueva Segovia in 1999. He eventually retired in 2005.

== Early life ==
Edmundo Abaya was born on January 19, 1929, in Candon, Ilocos Sur. He studied his tertiary studies at the University of Santo Tomas from 1947 to 1953.

== Career ==
He was ordained as priest on March 21, 1953. Pope John Paul II made him the bishop of the Roman Catholic Diocese of Laoag on December 11, 1978. He was the first Filipino bishop officially appointed by the pope. He served as the chairman for Catholic Bishops' Conference of the Philippines Commission on Ecumenical and Interreligious Affairs from 1988 to 1989. He served as a member of the CBCP Permanent Council from 1990 to 1991.

He was ordained and officially installed on January 19, 1979. He was appointed as the archbishop of the Roman Catholic Archdiocese of Nueva Segovia on May 22, 1999. He was officially installed on September 8 of the same year. His episcopal motto was "Cor Ardens Caritate" (transl. Heart aflamed for charity). He retired on May 31, 2005.

== Death ==
He died on September 20, 2018, at the Cardinal Santos Medical Center in San Juan, Metro Manila. He was 89 years old.

== See also ==
· · ·
