= Sarrat National High School =

Public high school in Ilocos Norte, Philippines

Location
- (Philippines) Sarrat, Ilocos Norte; Philippines; 18°09′36″N 120°38′59″E

Information
- Other name: SNHS
- Former names: Sarrat High School
- Established: 1947

Sarrat National High School (colloquially SNHS) is a public secondary school located at Brgy. San Francisco, Sarrat, Ilocos Norte. Established on 1947 and formerly known as Sarrat High School, it was officially renamed to Sarrat National High School under Presidential Decree 1050 in 1977).

SNHS sits just a stone-throw away from Sarrat North Central Elementary School.

== History ==
The school began meagerly with just a single building, in a privately owned house. Only the first two secondary levels were offered. Upon its foundation, it attracted a number of enrollees which prompted the municipal council to acquire the adjacent vacant lots for the school's classroom expansion. Inadequate funding were fulfilled by the gracious donations from some lot owners.

Students of Sarrat National High School participate and have received awards at international competitions such as the World Robot Games and the International Mathematical Olympiad.

== Campus ==
There are two campuses that serves the entire town: Main campus which covers the north part of the Padsan River and which includes the entire poblacion, while Sta. Rosa campus covers the south part of the town.

== Publications ==
"The Spearhead" is published and push into the school's circulation every quarterly. The editors and contributors compose of students from all levels. This paper features school events and progress, while giving new writers the opportunity to publish their work.
