= Ukrainian Catholic Archiepiscopal Exarchate of Kharkiv =

Ukrainian Catholic missionary jurisdiction in north eastern Ukraine

Archiepiscopal Exarchate of Kharkiv

Location
- Country: Ukraine
- Territory: Northern-Eastern Ukraine (Kharkiv, Poltava, and Sumy Oblasts)
- Headquarters: Kharkiv, Ukraine
- Population: ?

Information
- Sui iuris church: Ukrainian Greek Catholic
- Rite: Byzantine
- Established: April 2, 2014
- Cathedral: St. Nicholas Ukrainian Catholic Cathedral in Kharkiv

Current leadership
- Pope: Leo XIV
- Major Archbishop: Sviatoslav Shevchuk
- Archiepiscopal Exarch: Vasyl Tuchapets, O.S.B.M, Exarch of the Archiepiscopal Exarchate of Kharkiv

Map

The Archiepiscopal Exarchate of Kharkiv (Latin: Archiepiscopi Exarchatus Charcoviensis) was established on 2 April 2014 after division of the Ukrainian Catholic Archiepiscopal Exarchate of Donetsk – Kharkiv in two Exarchates . The current, and first, Archiepiscopal Exarch is Bishop Vasyl Tuchapets, O.S.B.M.

It is one of only five archiepiscopal exarchates worldwide - all of them being Ukrainian Rite.

In an interview with Aid to the Church in Need, Bishop Tuchapets described the social reality of his diocese in the following terms. “We started our work with our Greek Catholic Church faithful, made up mostly of former university students who remained in Kharkiv, and by former deportees to Siberia, but now most parishioners are locals who have found their faith through contact with our parishes. I think our task is to plough, to prepare the ground, after us come those who will sow, and the next generations will already reap."

== Status as Archiepiscopal Exarchate ==
As Major Archbishops have similar authority to that of Patriarchs, Archiepiscopal Exarchates similarly have roughly the same status in canon law as Patriarchal Exarchates.
