= Sarrat =

Municipality in Ilocos Norte, Philippines

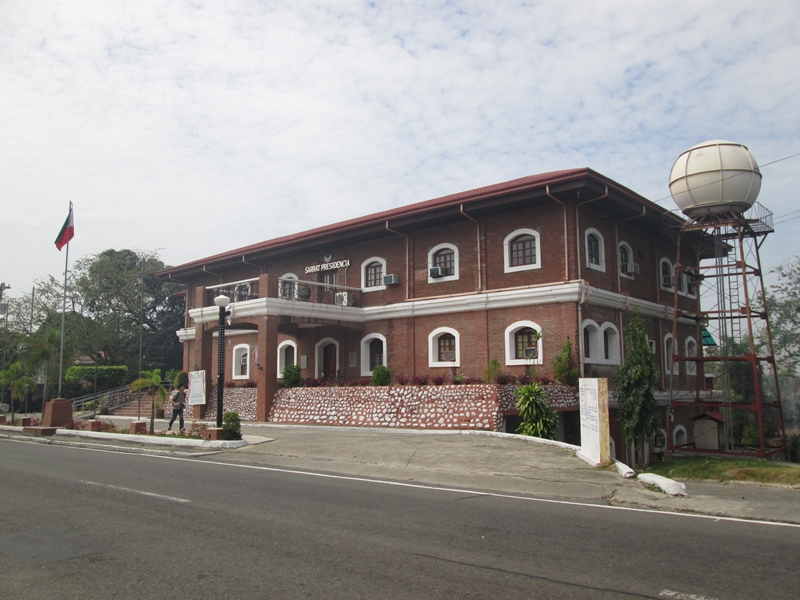
- New Sarrat Municipal Hall Sarrat Church Marcos Museum Sarrat

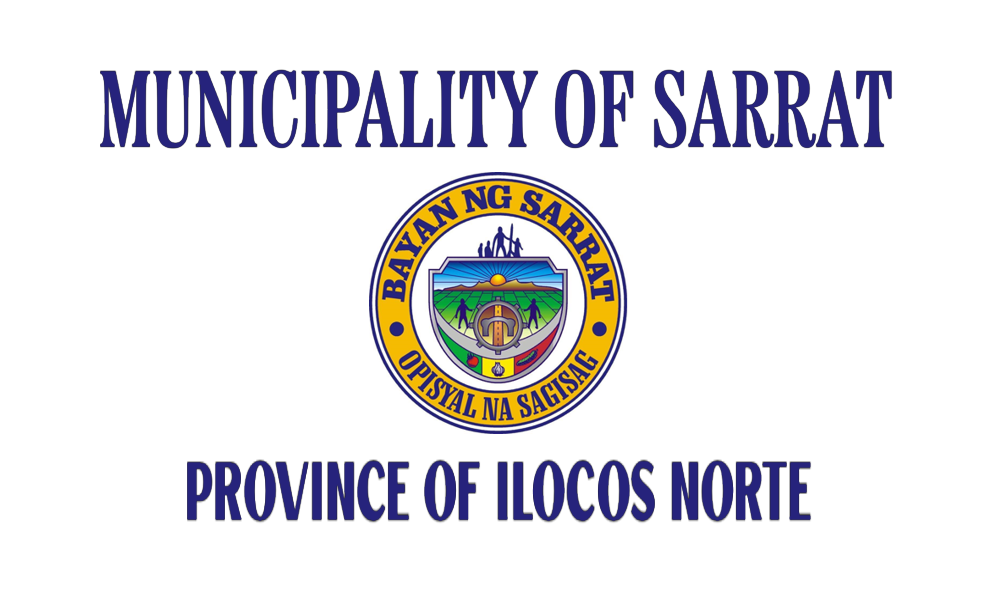
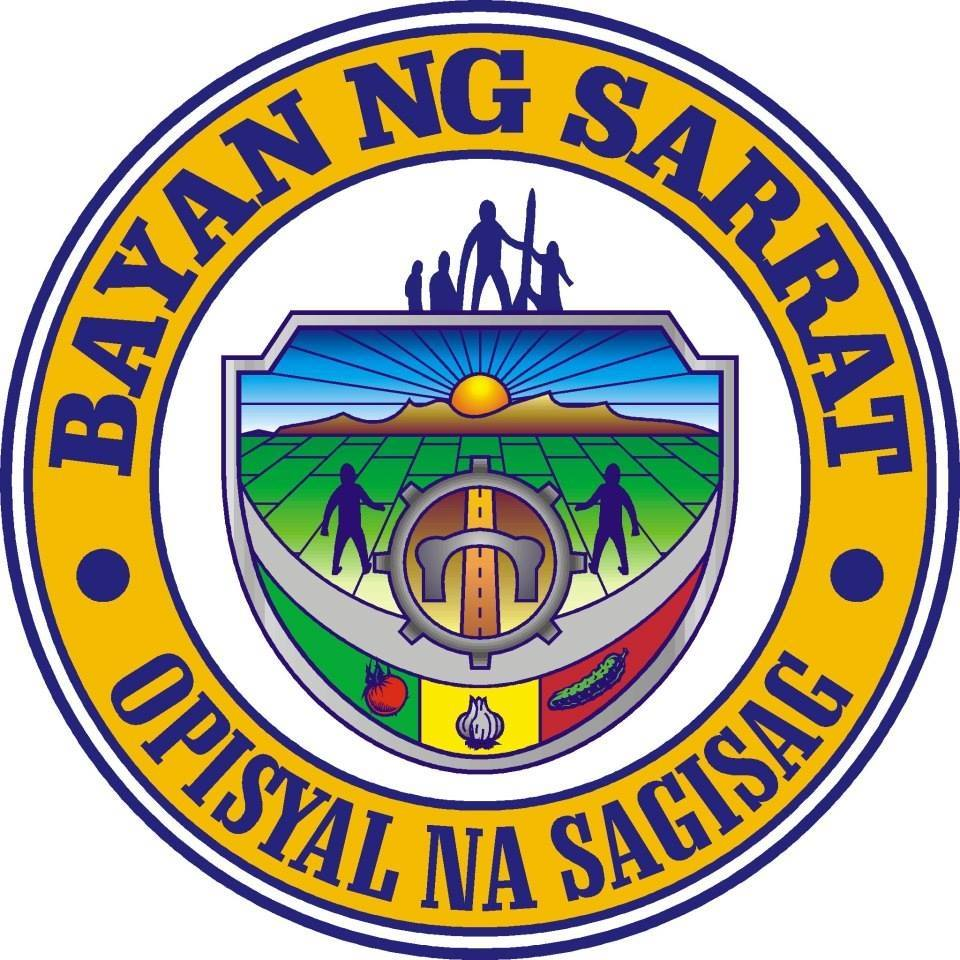
- Flag Seal

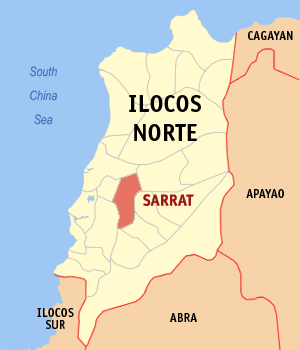
- Map of Ilocos Norte with Sarrat highlighted
- Interactive map of Sarrat
- Location within the Philippines
- Coordinates: 18°09′28″N 120°38′41″E
- Country: Philippines
- Region: Ilocos Region
- Province: Ilocos Norte
- District: 1st district
- Founded: 1586
- Barangays: 24 (see Barangays)

Government
  - Type: Sangguniang Bayan
  - Mayor: Ralph Conrad Francia Medrano
  - Vice Mayor: Virgilio L. Agoto
  - Representative: Sandro Marcos
  - Municipal Council: Members: Mary Anne A. Damaso; Arnel R. Pacog; Esteban O. Agoy; Paulino R. Baltazar; Marie-Fe G. Nacion; Jimmy B. Fajardo; Ferdinand B. Gaño; Apolonio G. Medrano
  - Electorate: 18,042 voters (2025)

Area
  - Total: 57.39 km^{2} (22.16 sq mi)
- Elevation: 49 m (161 ft)
- Highest elevation: 309 m (1,014 ft)
- Lowest elevation: 5 m (16 ft)

Population (2024 census)
  - Total: 26,294
  - Density: 458.2/km^{2} (1,187/sq mi)
  - Households: 6,442

Economy
  - Income class: 2nd municipal income class
  - Poverty incidence: 4.01% (2023)
  - Revenue: ₱ 220 million (2024)
  - Assets: ₱ 760.4 million (2024)
  - Expenditure: ₱ 152.7 million (2024)
  - Liabilities: ₱ 53.08 million (2024)

Service provider
  - Electricity: Ilocos Norte Electric Cooperative (INEC)
- Time zone: UTC+8 (PST)
- ZIP code: 2914
- PSGC: 0102821000
- IDD : area code: +63 (0)77
- Native languages: Ilocano; Tagalog

Sarrat, officially the Municipality of Sarrat (Ilocano: Ili ti Sarrat; Filipino: Bayan ng Sarrat), is a municipality in the province of Ilocos Norte, Philippines. According to the 2024 census, it has a population of 26,294 people.

The town is known as the birthplace of Ferdinand Marcos, the 10th President of the Philippines.

== Etymology ==
Cabayugan was how the people called Sarrat by its first settlers led by the village chief Minagel (Maingel) Bang'at and his wife Sarrah, before the arrival of the Spaniards in the latter part of the 16th century. Sarrat is a compound of the couple's names and is believed to have been coined by their son, Garo.

== History ==
Records show that Sarrat was initially established in 1724 in a location next to present-day San Nicolas at the southern bank of the Padsán River. The town was initially named San Miguel when the Augustinians erected a parish coinciding with the gaining of its township status on September 29 that year. In 1815, what became known as the Sarrat Rebellion broke out in the town, which was described as the bloodiest of the Ilocano uprisings in the early 19th century and resulted in the division of Ilocos into two provinces by the Spaniards to maintain their effective control over the region.

During the revolt, numerous wealthy residents were massacred and the town was burned to the ground. As a result, the town was moved to its present site on the north bank of the Padsan, while its old site, located three kilometers away subsequently became known as Nagrebcan, an Ilocano term for “vanquished” or “utterly destroyed”, which has since become part of Barangay Santa Monica in San Nicolas. The new site of Sarrat was given the name "San Miguel de Concuníg", a reference to its location at the foot of Mount Cunig.

During the American occupation, senators Santiago Fonacier and Isabelo delos Reyes created the bill that changed the town's name to Sarrat in 1916.

== Geography ==
The Municipality of Sarrat is situated geographically just southeast of Laoag, the capital of the province. Sarrat is bounded by the cities and municipalities of Batac to the south-west, San Nicolas to the west, Laoag to the north-west, Piddig to the north-east, Dingras to the east, the town of Marcos to the southeast, and a small portion of Banna to the south. The town is traversed and divided into two by the Padsan River, creating a north and south areas that are connected by the Sarrat Bridge.

Sarrat is situated 7.91 kilometres (4.92 mi) from the provincial capital Laoag, and 490.41 kilometres (304.73 mi) from the country's capital city of Manila.

=== Barangays ===
Sarrat is politically subdivided into 24 barangays. Each barangay consists of puroks and some have sitios.

- San Agustin (Poblacion)
- San Andres
- San Antonio
- San Bernabe
- San Cristobal
- San Felipe
- San Francisco (Poblacion)
- San Isidro
- San Joaquin (Poblacion)
- San Jose
- San Juan
- San Leandro (Poblacion)
- San Lorenzo
- San Manuel
- San Marcos
- San Miguel (formerly San Nicolas)
- San Pedro
- San Roque
- San Vicente (Poblacion)
- Santa Barbara (Poblacion)
- Santa Magdalena
- Santa Rosa
- Santo Santiago
- Santo Tomas

=== Climate ===
Climate data for Sarrat, Ilocos Norte
Month	Jan	Feb	Mar	Apr	May	Jun	Jul	Aug	Sep	Oct	Nov	Dec	Year
Mean daily maximum °C (°F)	27 (81)	28 (82)	30 (86)	32 (90)	31 (88)	31 (88)	30 (86)	30 (86)	30 (86)	29 (84)	28 (82)	27 (81)	29 (85)
Mean daily minimum °C (°F)	20 (68)	20 (68)	21 (70)	23 (73)	24 (75)	25 (77)	25 (77)	25 (77)	24 (75)	23 (73)	22 (72)	21 (70)	23 (73)
Average precipitation mm (inches)	38 (1.5)	37 (1.5)	37 (1.5)	49 (1.9)	181 (7.1)	214 (8.4)	264 (10.4)	251 (9.9)	243 (9.6)	229 (9.0)	129 (5.1)	96 (3.8)	1,768 (69.7)
Average rainy days	11.6	10.7	12.4	15.2	22.6	25.0	26.1	24.9	24.3	19.2	16.4	15.4	223.8
Source: Meteoblue

== Demographics ==
Population census of Sarrat

Year	Pop.	±% p.a.
1903	9,584	—
1918	12,885	+1.99%
1939	14,430	+0.54%
1948	14,345	−0.07%
1960	15,136	+0.45%
1970	16,847	+1.08%
1975	18,071	+1.42%
1980	18,798	+0.79%

Year	Pop.	±% p.a.
1990	21,272	+1.24%
1995	21,301	+0.03%
2000	22,886	+1.55%
2007	23,810	+0.55%
2010	24,770	+1.45%
2015	25,212	+0.34%
2020	25,186	−0.02%
2024	26,294	+1.04%

Source: Philippine Statistics Authority

In the 2024 census, the population of Sarrat was 26,294 people, with a density of 460 inhabitants per square kilometre or 1,200 inhabitants per square mile.

== Economy ==
Poverty incidence of Sarrat (%)

Source: Philippine Statistics Authority

Sarrat's crops include rice, corn, sugarcane, garlic, tobacco, peanuts, fruits and vegetables. Sarrat is also known for its cottage industry.

== Tourism ==
=== Santa Monica Parish Church ===
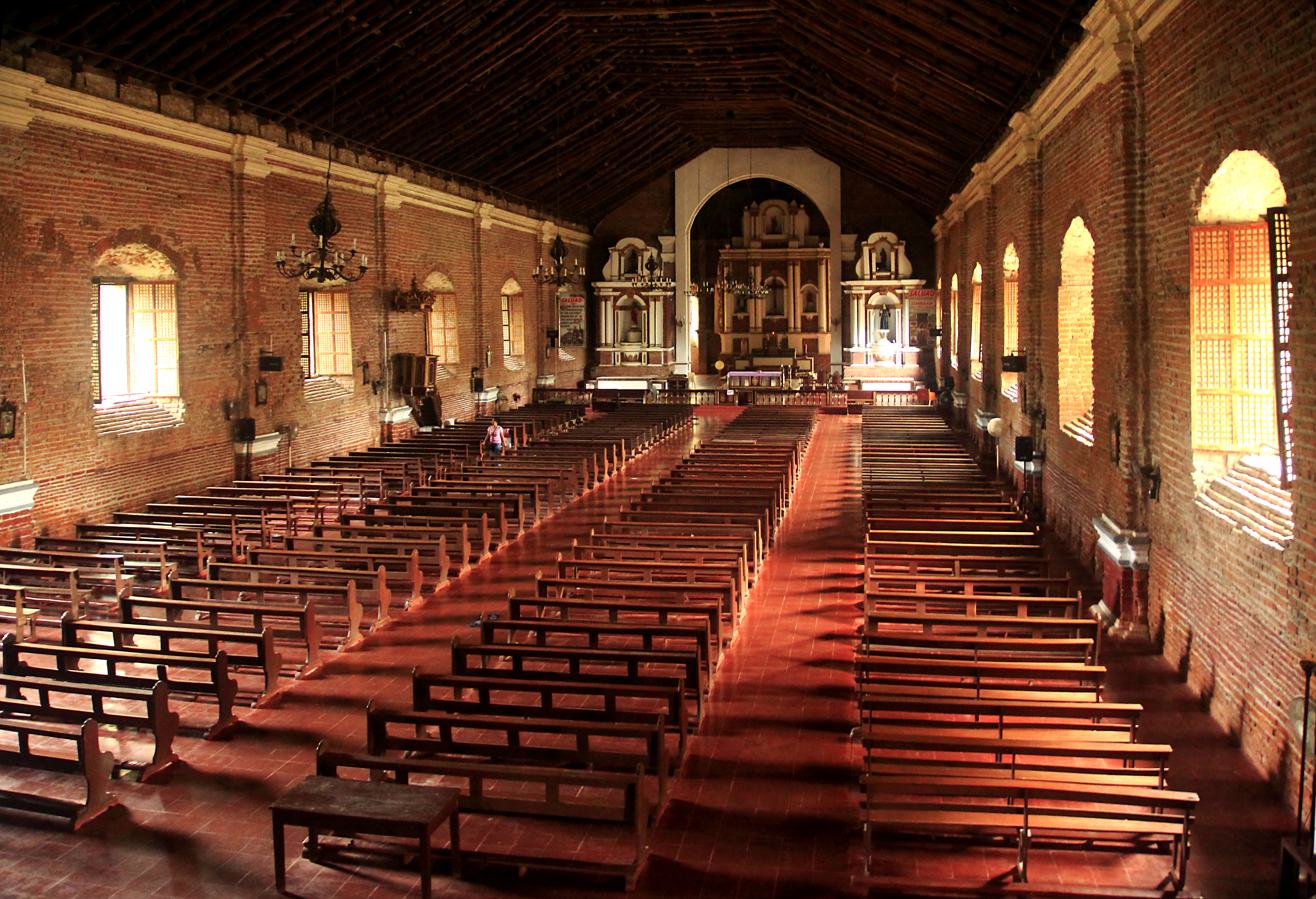
Sarrat Church interior

The Santa Monica Parish Church, commonly known as the Sarrat Church, is the largest church in Ilocos Norte and the most visited place by tourists in Sarrat. The church has one of the longest nave in the country and was declared an Important Cultural Property of the Philippines in September 2009.

The 105-meters long (the longest in the country) Church of St. Monica, first built in 1779 by the Augustinian friars, was the last Spanish church built in the Ilocos. It was destroyed on March 3, 1816, was rebuilt in 1848, burned again in 1882, repaired from 1875 to 1895 and finished between 1895 and 1898. Its bell tower was damaged during the March 19, 1932, earthquake. It has a unique, massive, 3-level and attractive brick staircase connecting the church with the convent. On one side of the church is the eight-foot high image of St. Monica. The church interior, along with the houses surrounding the plaza, were renovated in 1983 for Irene Marcos' (the youngest daughter of the President Ferdinand Marcos) wedding to Greggy Araneta. A few months later, on August 16, a magnitude 7.8 earthquake severely damaged the church's main altar and upper facade.

The impressive convent, known as the Casa del Palacio Real, was first built in 1779, completely burned on February 3, 1816, and was reconstructed in 1817 and 1886. It was, at times, used as a Presidencia Municipal during the American era. Within its environs, then were a jail where criminals and political prisoners were incarcerated and tortured, a sala court, a strangulation room and other secular sections. It also served, for a time, as the Colegio de Santa Monica (a branch of the Liceo de Manila). The convent was damaged during the 1932 earthquake and was repaired, in turns. In 1977, both church and convent were completely restored, with government assistance. The ground floor houses church memorabilia, church vestments and historical books and photographs.

The former 3-storey, square brick belfry of diminishing sizes, probably the largest in the province, has lost its top storeys. It once had a clock on the dome.

Sarrat Church is considered the largest church in the province, the church with the longest nave in the country, and is designated as an Important Cultural Property of the Philippines.

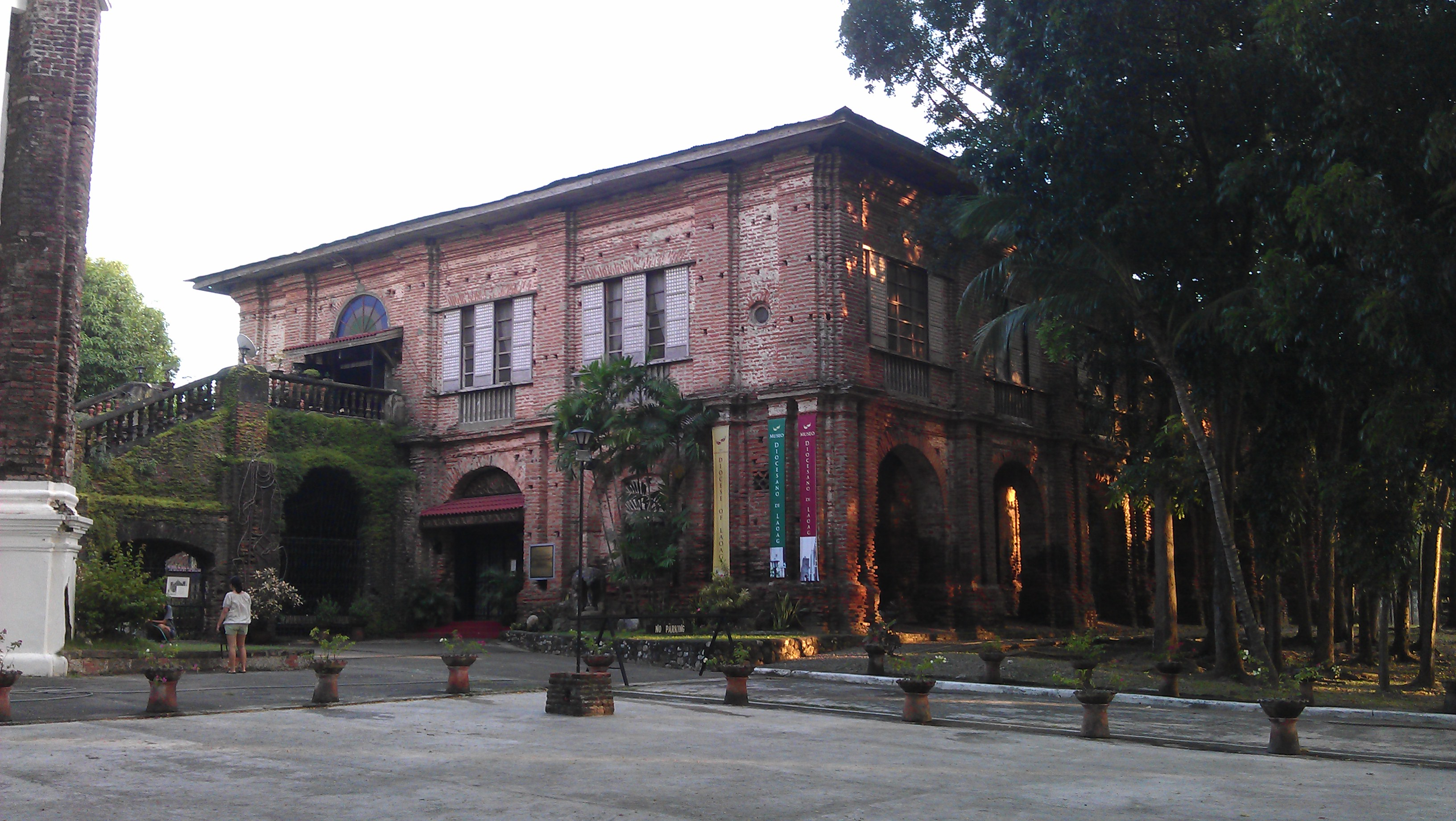
Santa Monica Parish Museum

=== Santa Monica Parish Museum ===
The Santa Monica Parish Museum is a repository of artifacts and memorabilia that dates back to the construction of the church edifice in 1779. It was established in 1993 on the initiative of its parish priest, Rev. Msgr. Jacinto A. Jose and Rev. Edmundo M. Abaya, D.D., Bishop of the Diocese of Laoag.

It was completed in 1997 with the help of the Kannawidan Foundation Inc.

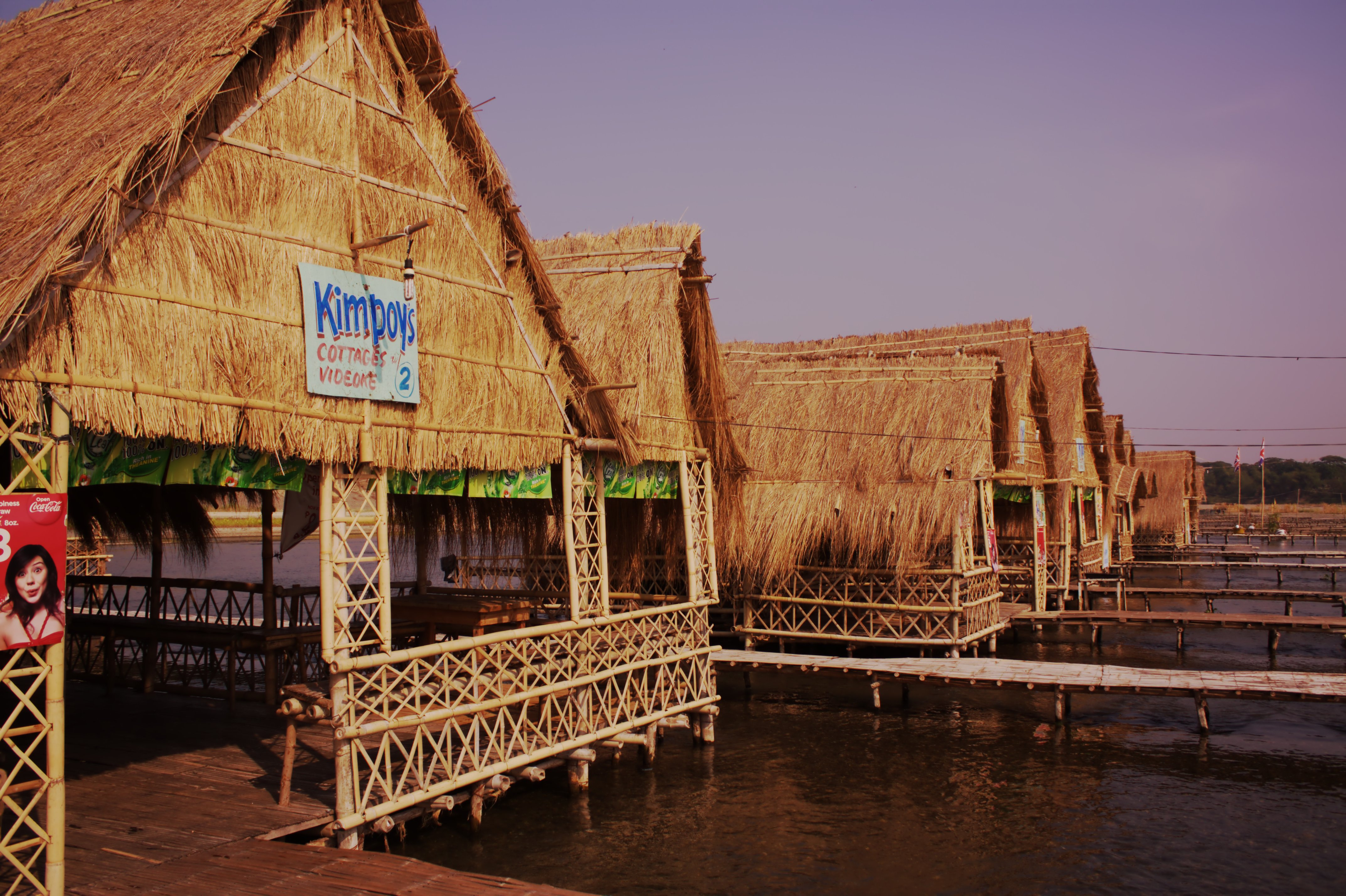
Barrio Uno River Resort

== Culture ==
Cultural Property wmph identifier (Note: wmph is an internal identifier used by Wikimedia Philippines to identify the monument. This is not an official identifier, and only shown temporarily in the templates until the government creates an updated complete list.)	Site name	Description	Province	City or municipality	Address	Coordinates	Image
	Sarrat Central Elementary School	Rebuilt in 1904	Ilocos Norte	Sarrat	Barangay 6, San Leandro	18°09′16″N 120°38′40″E	Upload file
	Bitanga's House		Ilocos Norte	Sarrat	Osmena corner Agor Street	18°09′17″N 120°38′45″E	Upload file
	Villa Ver		Ilocos Norte	Sarrat	Agor Street	18°09′18″N 120°38′45″E	Upload file
	Unknown House		Ilocos Norte	Sarrat	#41 Agor Street corner Quevedo	18°09′20″N 120°38′46″E	Upload Photo
	Unknown House		Ilocos Norte	Sarrat	Quirino corner Magsaysay Street	18°09′22″N 120°38′48″E	Upload file
	E. Carriaga Ver House		Ilocos Norte	Sarrat	#46 Magsaysay Street	18°09′19″N 120°38′48″E	Upload file
	Unknown House		Ilocos Norte	Sarrat	#199 Rizal Street corner Magsaysay, Brgy 5. San Vicente	18°09′19″N 120°38′46″E	Upload file
	Jose Ver-Balicanta House		Ilocos Norte	Sarrat	#149, Brgy 3 Santa Barbara	18°09′26″N 120°38′47″E	Upload file
	#124 Magsaysay St House		Ilocos Norte	Sarrat		18°09′24″N 120°38′50″E	Upload Photo
	Victoria Valmonte House		Ilocos Norte	Sarrat	#163 Barangay Santa Barbara	18°09′25″N 120°38′45″E	Upload file
	Scout Albano Monument and Park		Ilocos Norte	Sarrat	Albano Park	18°09′19″N 120°38′43″E	Upload file
	Laoag Diocesan Museum	Formerly known as Casa del Palacio Real, used as church convent	Ilocos Norte	Sarrat	Santa Monica Parish Complex	18°09′19″N 120°38′40″E	Upload file
	Sarrat Church	Parish Church of Santa Monica	Ilocos Norte	Sarrat	Santa Monica Parish Complex	18°09′21″N 120°38′41″E	Upload file
	Bell tower of Sarrat Church		Ilocos Norte	Sarrat	Santa Monica Parish Complex	18°09′23″N 120°38′40″E	Upload file
	Rit-ritemon Kaayong Uprising Monument	A monument in honor of Don Jamias Ver, leader of the people of Sarrat against the American invasion of the town. Named after the battle cry of the people of Sarrat, "Rit-ritemon Cayong" or "Rip it apart, brother."	Ilocos Norte	Sarrat	Sarrat Municipal Grounds	18°09′25″N 120°38′39″E	Upload file
	Vistuario de Sarrat	It was built from 1928 to 1931	Ilocos Norte	Sarrat	Sarrat Municipal Park	18°09′24″N 120°38′41″E	Upload file
	Rizal Monument	Donated by the youth of Iglesia Filipina Independiente	Ilocos Norte	Sarrat	Sarrat Municipal Park	18°09′24″N 120°38′43″E	Upload file
	Fabian Ver House		Ilocos Norte	Sarrat	Rizal Street, Barangay 2 San Agustin	18°09′25″N 120°38′41″E	Upload file
	Ver House		Ilocos Norte	Sarrat	#153 Rizal Street, Barangay 2 San Agustin	18°09′26″N 120°38′41″E	Upload file
	Dela Cuesta House		Ilocos Norte	Sarrat		18°09′26″N 120°38′40″E	Upload file
	Old Sarrat Town Hall		Ilocos Norte	Sarrat		18°09′24″N 120°38′39″E	Upload file
	Palafox House		Ilocos Norte	Sarrat	#157 Marcos Avenue, Barangay 2, San Agustin	18°09′27″N 120°38′40″E	Upload Photo
	Gabriel House		Ilocos Norte	Sarrat	Marcos Avenue, Barangay 2, San Agustin	18°09′27″N 120°38′38″E	Upload Photo
	New Sarrat Presidencia		Ilocos Norte	Sarrat	Marcos Avenue, Barangay 2, San Agustin	18°09′29″N 120°38′39″E	Upload file
	Edralin House	also known as Marcos Museum	Ilocos Norte	Sarrat	Marcos Avenue	18°09′34″N 120°38′40″E	Upload file
	Familia Ruiz Ancestral House	Ruins of the old brick house of Don Teodulo Ruiz and Doña Dolores Bello Ruiz of Sarrat, Ilocos Norte	Ilocos Norte	Sarrat	Ruiz Street Barangay 3	18°09′30″N 120°38′42″E	Upload file
	Bitanga's House		Ilocos Norte	Sarrat	Osmena corner Agor Street	18°09′17″N 120°38′45″E	Upload file

== Government ==
=== Local government ===
Former seal of Sarrat

Sarrat, belonging to the first congressional district of the province of Ilocos Norte, is governed by a mayor designated as its local chief executive and by a municipal council as its legislative body in accordance with the Local Government Code. The mayor, vice mayor, and the councilors are elected directly by the people through an election which is being held every three years.

=== Elected officials ===
Members of the Municipal Council (2025–2028)
Position	Name
Congressman	Ferdinand Alexander A. Marcos III
Mayor	Ralph Conrad F. Medrano
Vice-Mayor	Remigio B. Medrano
Councilors	Mary Anne A. Damaso
Councilors	Ignacio Ritche C. Balicanta IV
Councilors	Esteban O. Agoy
Councilors	Andres Rustico H. Agno
Councilors	John Wendell L. Medrano
Councilors	Paulino R. Baltazar
Councilors	Virgilio L. Agoto
Councilors	Jil M. Aguilar

== Transportation ==
Going around the poblacion is served by the tricycles (Filipino: traysikel), a local term for a motorized transport made by pairing a motorcycle with a locally fabricated sidecar. These are also used to transport commuters to other remote barangays but usually through a special fare, the amount of which depends on what is agreed upon before the trip.

A regular and daily trip to neighboring Laoag City is provided by jeepneys, the main form of transportation. All jeepneys that ply the route are members of the Laoag-Sarrat Jeepney Operators and Drivers Association (LSJODA). Travel time takes around 15 minutes each way on a usual day.

== Education ==
The Sarrat Schools District Office governs all public and private elementary and high schools within the municipality. It offers its constituency up to secondary education. Tertiary and higher educations are provided by the neighboring Laoag City.

=== Primary and elementary schools ===
- Binaratan Elementary School
- Cabuloan Elementary School
- Golgol Elementary School
- North Central Elementary School
- Pandan Elementary School
- Parang Elementary School
- Patad Elementary School
- Ruiz Elementary School
- Sagpatan Elementary School
- San Antonio Elementary School
- San Bernabe Elementary School
- Sarrat Central School
- Sarrat North Central School
- South Central Elementary School
- Sta Rosa Elementary School
- San Pedro Public School
- San Andres Public School

=== Secondary schools ===
- Sarrat National High School
- Santa Rosa National High School

== Notable personalities ==
- Ferdinand E. Marcos, the 10th President of the Republic of the Philippines.
- Fabian C. Ver, a former General and Chief of the Armed Forces of the Philippines.

== See also ==
- List of renamed cities and municipalities in the Philippines

== Bibliography ==
- Dela Torre, Visitacion (2006). The Ilocos Heritage. Makati City: Tower Book House. ISBN 978-971-91030-9-7.
