= St Ninian's High School =

Saint Ninian's High School or St Ninian's High School may refer to:

- St Ninian's High School, Douglas, Isle of Man
- St Ninian's High School, Giffnock, East Renfrewshire, Scotland
- St Ninian's High School, Kirkintilloch, East Dunbartonshire, Scotland
