= Laoag Cathedral =

Roman Catholic church in Ilocos Norte, Philippines

Saint William's Cathedral (Laoag)
- Cathedral Church of St. William
- Catedral de San Guillermo (Spanish)
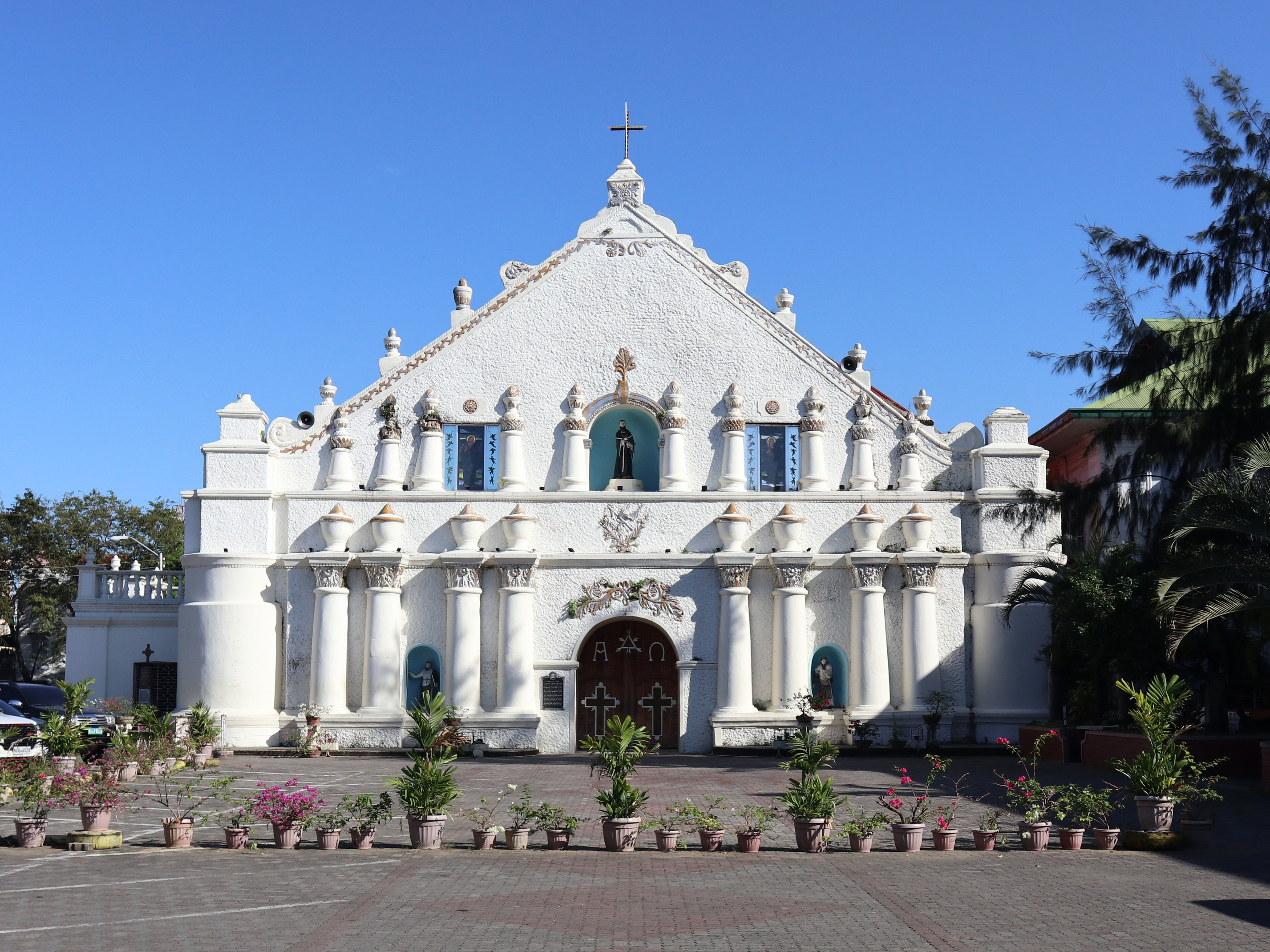
- Cathedral facade in 2022

- Location within Luzon Location within Philippines
- 18°11′38″N 120°35′37″E
- Location: Laoag, Ilocos Norte
- Country: Philippines
- Denomination: Roman Catholic

History
- Status: Cathedral
- Founded: 1580
- Dedication: Saint William of Maleval

Architecture
- Functional status: Active
- Architectural type: Church building
- Style: Italian Renaissance
- Completed: 1880 (current)

Administration
- Province: Nueva Segovia
- Diocese: Laoag

Clergy
- Bishop: Renato Mayugba

Saint William's Cathedral, commonly known as Laoag Cathedral, is a Roman Catholic church in Laoag City, Ilocos Norte, Philippines. It serves as the seat or central church of the Diocese of Laoag. The current church was built in 1612 by Augustinian friars to replace a wooden chapel.

== History ==
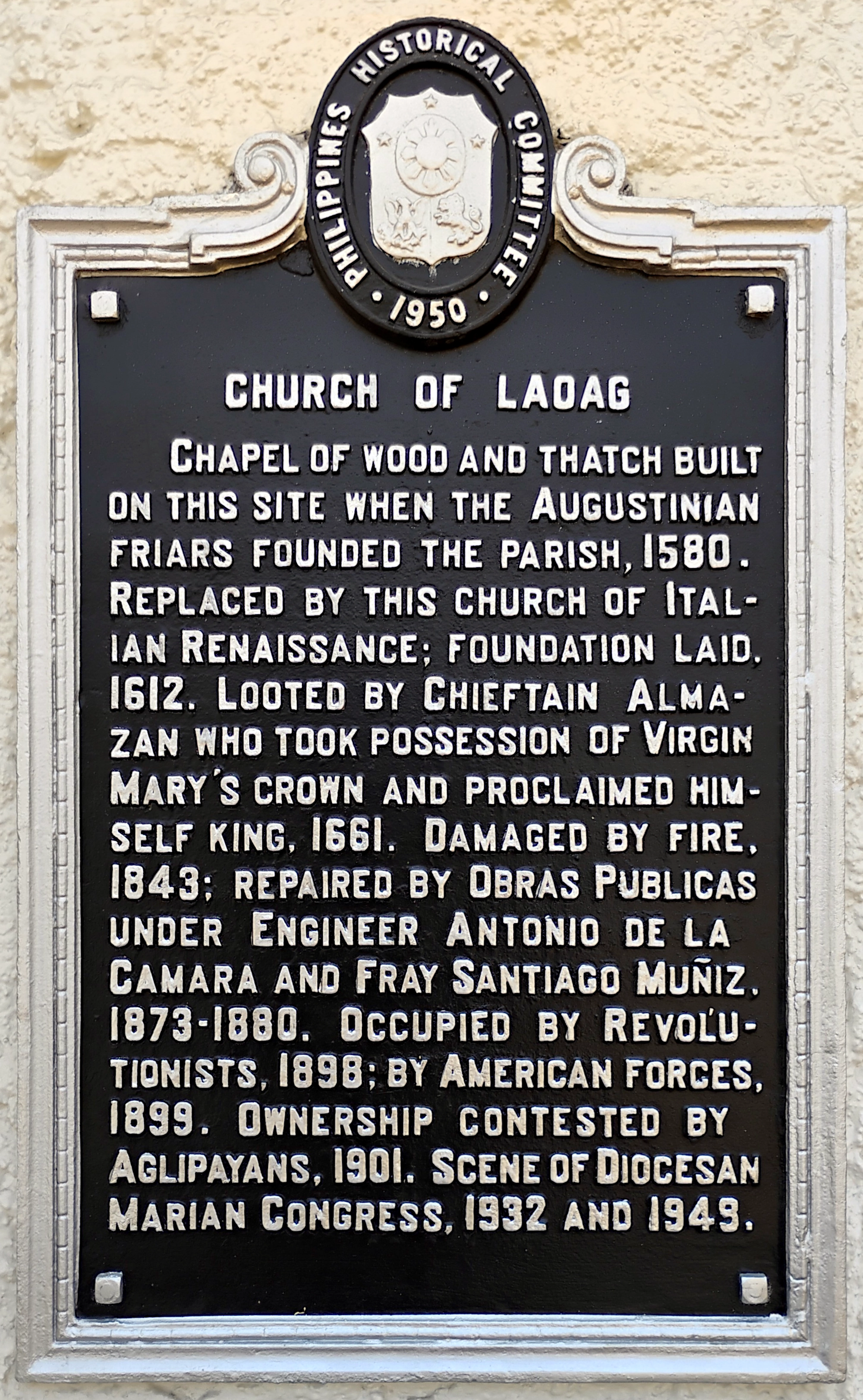
Church PHC historical marker installed in 1950

The first church of Laoag was made of wood and thatch when the Augustinians established the parish in 1580. The foundations of the current church were laid in 1612. It was damaged by fire in 1843 and was restored from 1873 to 1880 by the Obras Publicas under Engineer Antonio de la Camara and Father Santiago Muniz.

The church was occupied by Philippine revolutionaries in 1898, and later by the American forces in 1899. The ownership of the church was contested by the Aglipayans from the Roman Catholic Church from which the latter won ownership. The church facade was renovated by adding lime plaster in 1936.

It became a cathedral when the Diocese of Laoag was established in 1961. The church was again renovated from 1971 to 1972. It was slightly damaged in the 1983 Luzon earthquake.

== Features ==
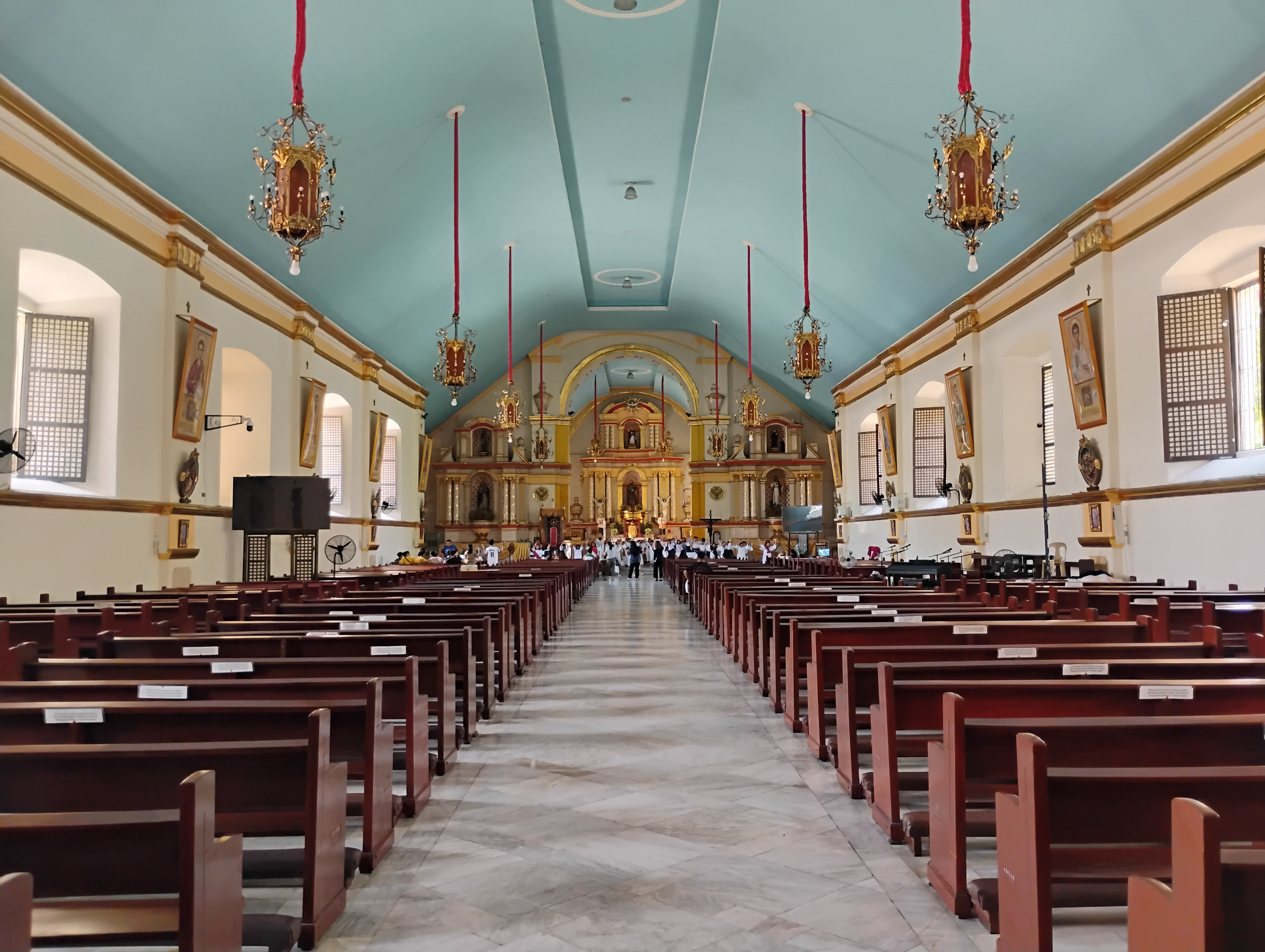
Church interior in 2025

The church is known for its Italian Renaissance design. It also has an unusual two-storey façade, supported by two pairs of columns on each side of the arched entrance. The top of the façade holds a recessed niche that showcases the image of the city's patron saint, San Guillermo el Ermitaño. It has windows made from capiz with wrought iron screens.

It has a main retablo and two smaller ones on its sides. The lower level of the huge retablo contains the image of Saint William, the parish's patron saint.

=== Sinking Bell Tower ===
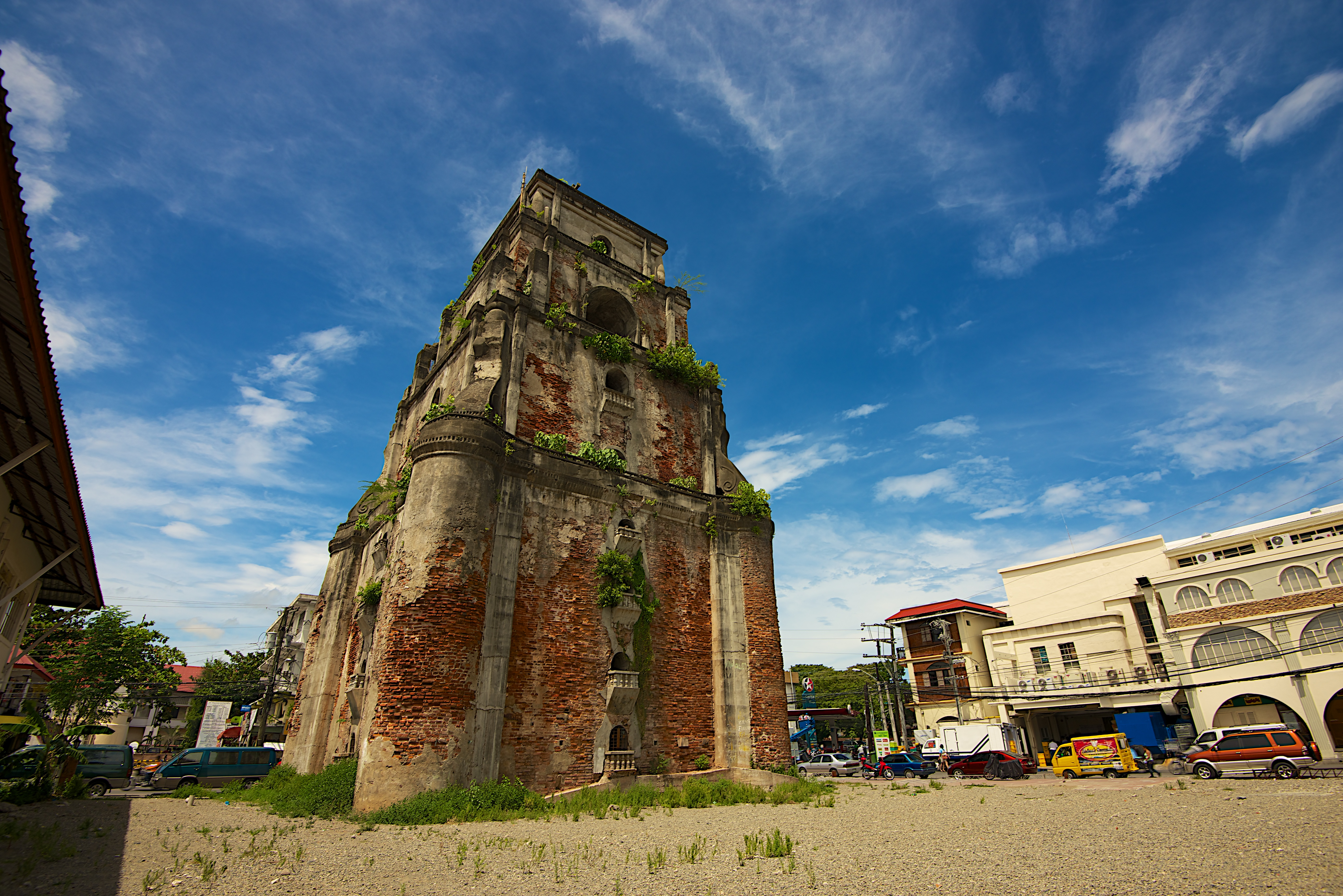
The Sinking Bell Tower

The church is also famous for its "Sinking Bell Tower", which sinks into the ground at a rate of an inch a year. It has survived several minor earthquakes since its construction, causing scholars to label it an Earthquake Baroque style structure. The tower, built presumably after the 1707 earthquake, has a foundation of 90 metres (300 ft). It is made of locally manufactured bricks joined by molasses and juice of sablot leaves mixed with lime and sand, and reinforced with four massive columns on each corner and a winding stairway leading to the belfry. It used to have a large clock on the tower's western face.

== Bibliography ==
- Dela Torre, Visitacion (2006). The Ilocos Heritage. Makati: Tower Book House. ISBN 978-971-91030-9-7.
- Historical Markers: Regions I-IV and CAR (in Filipino). Manila: National Historical Institute (Philippines). 1993. p. 88. ISBN 9715380611.
