= Renato Mayugba =

Filipino bishop (born 1955)

His Excellency, The Most Reverend Renato Pine Mayugba D.D.
- Bishop of Laoag
- Church: Roman Catholic Church
- Diocese: Laoag
- Appointed: October 12, 2012
- Installed: December 11, 2012
- Predecessor: Sergio Lasam Utleg
- Previous posts: Auxiliary Bishop of Lingayen-Dagupan (2005–2012); Titular Bishop of Centuriones (2005–2012)

Orders
- Ordination: April 25, 1981
- Consecration: December 27, 2005 by Antonio Franco

Personal details
- Born: December 4, 1955 (age 70) UST Hospital, Manila, Philippines
- Motto: Linum Fumigans Non Extinguet "A dimly burning wick [which] he will not quench" (Isaiah 42:3)
- Coat of arms

Styles of Renato Mayugba
- Reference style: His Excellency; The Most Reverend
- Spoken style: Your Excellency
- Religious style: Monsignor

Renato Pine Mayugba (born December 4, 1955) is a Filipino bishop of the Roman Catholic Church, currently serving as the bishop of Laoag. He previously served as Auxiliary Bishop of Lingayen-Dagupan and Titular Bishop of Centuriones from 2005 to 2012.

== Early life and education ==
Mayugba was born on December 4, 1955, at UST Hospital in Manila, Philippines. He completed his elementary education at St. Louis University in Baguio City. He later pursued his secondary education at Mary Help of Christians Minor Seminary in Binmaley, Pangasinan. For his undergraduate and theological studies, he attended Immaculate Conception Major Seminary in Vigan, Ilocos Sur. Afterward, he obtained a licentiate from the Pontifical University of Saint Thomas Aquinas in Rome, Italy.

== Priesthood ==
Mayugba was ordained a priest on April 25, 1981, for the Archdiocese of Lingayen-Dagupan. His early ministry included serving as Parochial Vicar at St. Peter and St. Paul Parish in Calasiao from 1981 to 1982. Following this, he was appointed rector of the Pre-College Seminary in Bonuan, Dagupan City, a position he held until 1985. From 1985 to 1988, he furthered his studies in Rome.

Upon his return, he took on the role of dean of studies at the Immaculate Conception School of Theology in Vigan from 1988 to 1990. He later served as the rector of the same institution from 1990 to 1993. After a brief study leave at UST Manila between 1993 and 1995, he was appointed as the SFY Director of the Immaculate Conception School of Theology from 1995 to 1996. He resumed his role as rector of the institution from 1996 to 1999.

Following a sabbatical leave in 1999–2000, he became the SFY Spiritual Director at Immaculate Conception School of Theology from 2000 to 2001. In 2001, he was appointed Parish Priest of Our Lady of Purification Parish in Binmaley, a post he held until 2003. He then became the rector of Mary Help of Christians College Seminary in Bonuan, a position he held until his episcopal appointment in 2005.

== Episcopal ministry ==
On October 18, 2005, Pope Benedict XVI appointed him as the Auxiliary Bishop of the Archdiocese of Lingayen-Dagupan and Titular Bishop of Centuriones. He was consecrated on December 27, 2005, by Archbishop Antonio Franco.

On October 12, 2012, he was appointed as the bishop of Laoag by Pope Benedict XVI.

During his tenure, Bishop Mayugba has been active in promoting the cause for sainthood of Niña Ruiz Abad, a young Filipina known for her devotion to the Eucharist. In October 2023, he issued an edict calling for testimonies about her life and virtues as part of the diocesan process for her possible beatification and canonization. By December 2023, the Vatican’s Dicastery for the Causes of Saints confirmed that there were no obstacles preventing the inquiry from proceeding, marking the first step toward her potential canonization.

Bishop Mayugba has also emphasized the importance of the Word of God in daily life. As the Chairperson of the Episcopal Commission on Biblical Apostolate of the CBCP, he has encouraged the faithful to integrate the Scriptures into their lives, especially in an era of widespread misinformation.

He has also been involved in various commissions of the Catholic Bishops' Conference of the Philippines (CBCP). Between 2007 and 2009, he was a member of the Commission on Biblical Apostolate. From 2007 to 2013, he participated in the Commission on Culture. From 2009 to 2015, he served as vice-chairman of the CBCP Commission on Biblical Apostolate. From 2013 to 2015, he has been a member of the Commission on Family and Life. From 2019 to 2021, he is a member of Commissions on Mutual Relations between Bishops and Religious and the Commission for the Biblical Apostolate. From 2021 to 2025 he serve as the chairman of the Commission on Biblical Apostolate.

== See also ==
- Roman Catholic Diocese of Laoag
- Catholic Church in the Philippines

Catholic Church titles
Preceded by Sergio Lasam Utleg	Bishop of Laoag; December 11, 2012 – present	Incumbent
Preceded by Kiro Stojanov	— TITULAR — Titular Bishop of Centuriones; December 27, 2005 – October 12, 2012	Succeeded by Vasyl Tuchapets
