= Diocese of Laoag =

Latin Catholic diocese in the Philippines

Diocese of Laoag Dioecesis Laoagensis Diocesis ti Laoag Diosesis ng Laoag Diócesis de Laoag

Catholic
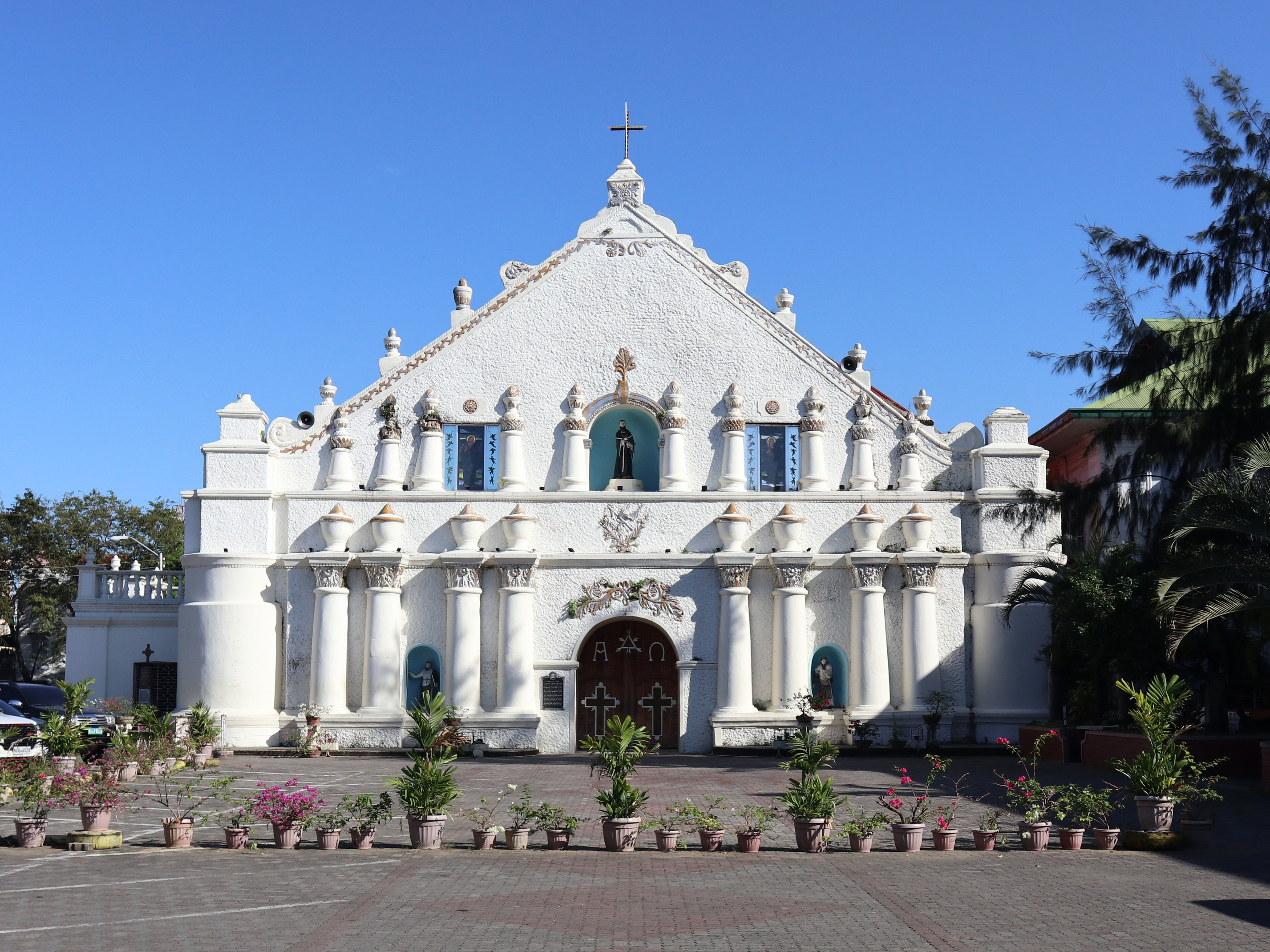
- Laoag Cathedral

- Coat of arms

Location
- Country: Philippines
- Territory: Ilocos Norte
- Ecclesiastical province: Nueva Segovia
- Coordinates: 18°11′37″N 120°35′38″E

Statistics
- Area: 3,386 km^{2} (1,307 sq mi)
- Population: Total; Catholics: (as of 2021); 618,253; 367,998 (59.5%)
- Parishes: 30

Information
- Denomination: Catholic Church
- Sui iuris church: Latin Church
- Rite: Roman Rite
- Established: June 5, 1961
- Cathedral: Cathedral of Saint William the Hermit
- Patron saint: William the Hermit
- Secular priests: 54

Current leadership
- Pope: Leo XIV
- Bishop: Renato Pine Mayugba
- Metropolitan Archbishop: David William Antonio

Map
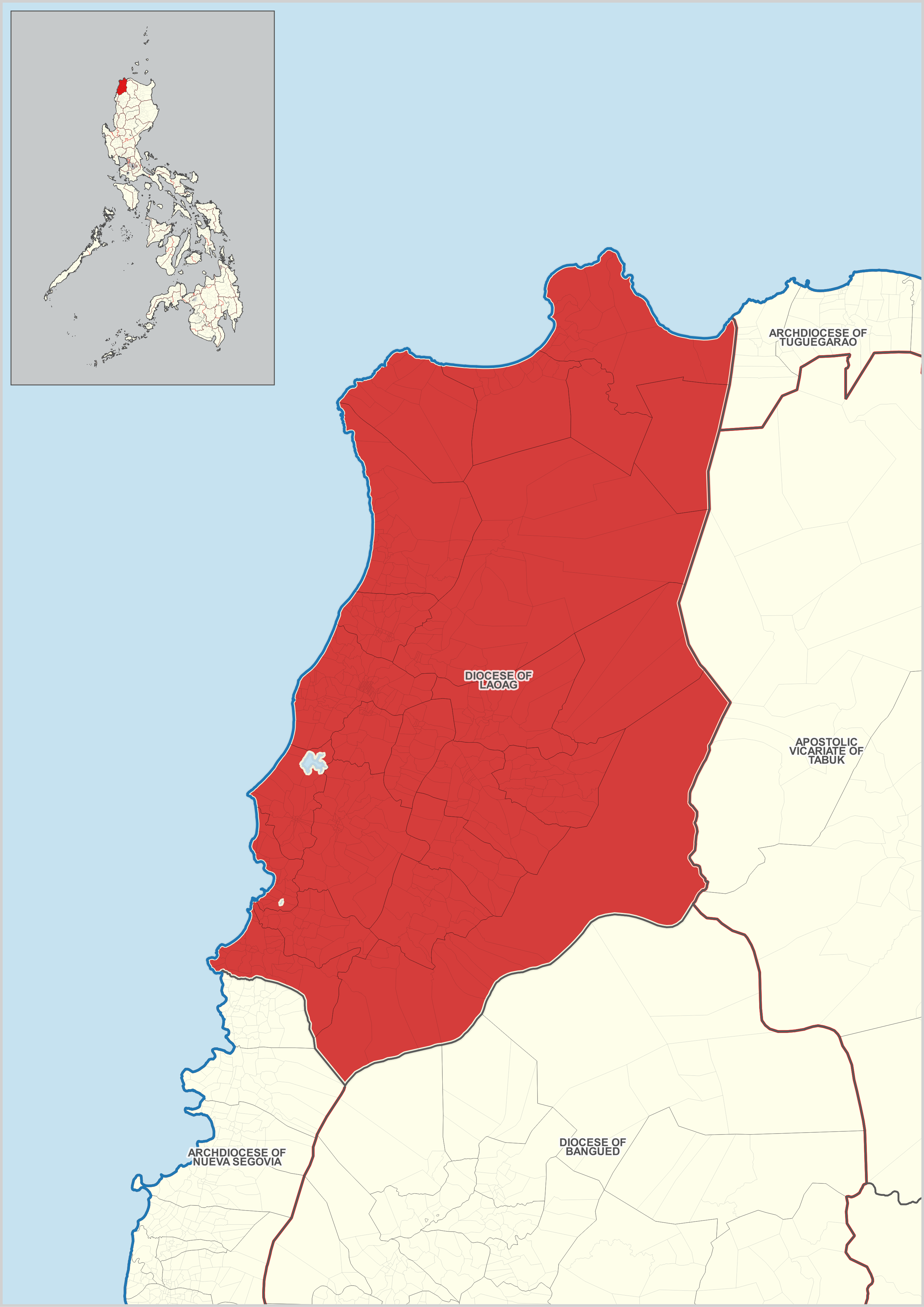
- Territorial jurisdiction of the Diocese of Laoag

The Diocese of Laoag (Latin: Dioecesis Laoagensis) is a Latin Church ecclesiastical jurisdiction or diocese of the Catholic Church in the Philippines.

The diocese was erected in 1961 from the Archdiocese of Nueva Segovia. It was sede vacante from June 15, 2011, to October 11, 2012. On October 12, 2012, Pope Benedict XVI appointed Most Rev. Renato P. Mayugba, then Auxiliary Bishop of the Roman Catholic Archdiocese of Lingayen-Dagupan, as the sixth bishop of the diocese.

== Ordinaries ==
No	Image	Name	In office	Coat of arms
1.		Antonio Lloren Mabutas	(June 5, 1961 – July 25, 1970, appointed Coadjutor Archbishop of Davao)	
2.		Rafael Montiano Lim	(February 12, 1971 – January 26, 1978, appointed Bishop of Boac)	
3.		Edmundo Madarang Abaya	(December 11, 1978 – May 12, 1999, appointed Archbishop of Nueva Segovia)	
4.		Ernesto Antolin Salgado	(December 7, 2000 – May 31, 2005, appointed Archbishop of Nueva Segovia)	
5.		Sergio Lasam Utleg	(November 13, 2006 – June 11, 2011, appointed Archbishop of Tuguegarao)	
6.		Renato Pine Mayugba	(October 12, 2012—Present)	

== Pre-Hispanic Ilocos ==
Long before the coming of the Spaniards, there already existed an extensive region (consisting of the present provinces of Ilocos Norte, Ilocos Sur, Abra and La Union) renowned for its gold mines. Merchants from Japan and China would often visit the area to barter beads, ceramics and silk with gold. The inhabitants of the region believed to be of Malay origin, called their place Samtoy from saomi ditoy, which literally meant "language spoken in this place".

Like other parts of the Philippines, Ilocos Norte before the advent of Spanish colonization was inhabited by different tribes. Settlements were located along the river systems. Most people preferred to settle down near their farming or hunting grounds. Trade between seashore communities and nearby China must have been present considering the proximity of the place with mainland Cathay. Religion was mainly animistic with the belief in Supreme Being like "Kabunian" and other minor spirits which were collectively known as "di-kataotao-an".

== Colonization of Ilocos Norte and Christianization ==
Christianity came to this part of the country in June 1572 during Northern Luzon "pacification" campaign led by the Spanish conquistador Juan de Salcedo and his Augustinian chaplain Alonzo de Alvarado. It is said that the cross was first planted on top of what is now known as Ermita Hill in Laoag. However, it was not until 1575 when Vigan was finally "pacified" by the Castilians that effective evangelization campaign reached this part of the newly established Province of Ilocos. During this last quarter of the 16th century, mission centers were established in Laoag, Bacarra, San Nicolas, Batac and Dingras. Towards the end of Spanish rule in the Philippines, there were 13 towns.

The evangelization of this northern part of Ilocos province was done by the Augustinian friars, where they did their apostolate until the end of Spanish rule in 1898.

Like the other parts of the country, which were pacified and claimed for the Castilian standard, the Ilocos was soon divided into encomiendas, which were awarded to deserving colonizers. The encomienda was more of a grant of jurisdiction than ownership. The encomendero was granted jurisdiction over a land of its people. He had the rights to exact tributes from the people and was privileged to get services from them. However, he had the duty to protect them and to give them religious instruction. But very soon the encomienda system lost its luster in favor of the more lucrative China trade with the galleon system plying from Manila to Acapulco and vice versa. Towards the end of the Spanish Regime, of the 460,000 hectares comprising the land area of Ilocos Norte, 33,500 were planted with tobacco, palay, sugar cane, indigo, corn and vegetables and worked by 35,000 farmers out of a population of 160,000.

Ilocos Norte was so remote from the central government in Manila during the Spanish Regime. It was rural and rustic. Owing to the abusive practices of the Spaniards, a number of Ilocanos revolted against their colonizers. A number of uprisings erupted. Noteworthy of these were the Dingras uprising (1589) and Pedro Almazan revolt (San Nicolas, 1660). One in Bacarra led by a certain Juan Magsanop was triggered by a series of revolts in the south in the 17th century. The Augustinian parish priest of the town Juan de Arias was killed by the rebels. In the first quarter of the 19th century three rebellions in a row erupted in a period of fifteen years, which prompted the colonial government to divide the Ilocos province in 1818. One of these revolts in Piddig town was caused by the government's attempt to put a monopoly on the production of basi, a locally produced wine fermented from sugarcane juice.

The Diocese of Laoag shares the early history of its mother see, the Archdiocese of Nueva Segovia. As mentioned above, Christianity came to this northernmost frontier of the far-flung Spanish colony in 1572 as a part of the “pacification campaign” by the Spaniards led by the youthful and swashbuckling conquistador Juan de Salcedo. The cross and the sword came thus planting the standards of Christianity and the monarchy of Spain on this part of the world. The northern part of the old Ilocos Province came to be known as Ilocos Norte since 1818. The division was exacerbated by three revolts (1807, 1811 and 1815).

== The Aglipayan schism ==
Three quarters of a century later a rebellion was experienced in the religious sphere. The Philippine Religious Revolution at the turn of the 20th century that gave rise to the Iglesia Filipina Independiente (IFI) made Ilocos Norte as its epicenter. Only one of the seventeen Filipino priests then assigned to the province remained steadfast to the Catholic faith. This was mainly because the former guerilla priest Gregorio Aglipay, now the religious leader of the new schismatic movement, was from Batac; and both his lieutenants, Simeon Mandac and Santiago Fonacier, were from Laoag. The “Independientes”, (to distinguish them from the “Romanos”) as they were subsequently called, brought with them about 95% of the total population of Ilocos Norte.

It was a slow and painful recovery for the "Romanos" in this part of the Philippines. The years following 1902, the foundation year of the IFI, were difficult. All church properties except for Laoag Cathedral were taken over by the schismatics. However, the Philippine Supreme Court's landmark decision in 1905 (Barlin vs. Ramirez) ordering the return of properties belonging to the Roman Catholic Church, which were taken over by the Independientes, saved the day for the Romanos. Priests were soon assigned to the parishes of Ilocos Norte, many to their hometowns to bring back to the fold their relatives and their tenants. It includes Luis Cortez of Badoc, Clemente Edralin of Sarrat (who was later murdered in his convent of mysterious causes), and Atanacio Albano of Bacarra.

== Diocese of Laoag and Antonio Mabutas, its first bishop ==
The Civil Province of Ilocos Norte became the Diocese of Laoag in 1961. The first bishop was the former chancellor of the mother see of Nueva Segovia, Antonio Ll. Mabutas of Agoo, La Union. The next decade saw the building up of the new diocese. Infrastructure had to be built and the people spiritually prepared and clergy had to be united.

The St. Mary's Seminary opened its doors to the first batch of seminarians in 1963, although the construction was still going on. The bishop's residence soon stood up along Gomez Street in the then outskirts of Laoag City. The Catholic Center Building near the cathedral replaced the old Knights of Columbus building. Catholic Schools were opened (St. Anne in Piddig, St. James in Pasuquin, St. Lawrence in Bangui and St. Jude in Pagudpud) to add to those already existing at the time of the separation.

Lay formation centered on the Cursillos de Cristianidad. This was a weekend lived-in retreat. Then came a new trend in catechesis, the Christian Community Program. This was a different approach from the Baltimore-type of traditional catechism. The Diocese of Laoag was one of the experimental centers for the whole Philippines.

A good number of priests from La Union (6) and Ilocos Sur (6) were “trapped” in the D

== The episcopacy of Rafael Lim ==
When the 1970s came, storm clouds were looming in the horizon for the Diocese of Laoag. In 1970, Bishop Mabutas was elected coadjutor Archbishop of Davao. Archbishop Juan Sison of Nueva Segovia was apostolic administrator during the months of vacancy. The following year Bishop Rafael Lim of Marinduque came to Laoag. This was a difficult decade everywhere: the first and second quarters saw the storm of activism, the “hippie” generation, Martial Law and dictatorship, the changes brought about by Vatican II were now being felt.

It was Bishop Lim who brought about the first reshuffle of priests' assignments in the diocese, thus moving the well-entrenched “immovables”. The general reshuffle in 1973 also tried to standardize the finances of the parishes with priests theoretically receiving equal remunerations. A system of parish financial reporting was established with transparency as the end in view. This did not progress in the ensuing years, and it was eventually dropped to give away to the quota system, that is, each parish was assessed and the amount to be submitted to the curia was fixed.

The Diocese experienced the exodus of priests in this decade. Many priests either left the diocese or left the active ministry. By 1978 five parishes were already without priests. In the middle of this year, Bishop Lim became the first bishop of the newly created Diocese of Boac in Marinduque, his home province. The Rev. Jose F. Agustin served as diocesan administrator.

== Edmundo Abaya: The shepherd for 20 years ==
By early 1979, the diocese had its third bishop in the person of Edmundo M. Abaya of Candon, Ilocos Sur. The next two decades saw the diocese on the rise. New Orders of Sisters came mainly to do pastoral work. At its highest number, there were 17 religious orders of sisters working in the diocese. The priestly identity crisis brought about by the shift of things by Vatican II was on the wane. More vocations, hence more ordinations, were coming up. The catechetical program of the diocese was beefed up with a more centralized management. However, the once thriving Catholic schools in the diocese were on the run because of many factors.

The strong earthquake of 1983 wrought havoc and destruction to the centuries-old churches of the diocese. Two years later all the destroyed churches and rectories were rebuilt or restored.

The diocese of Laoag celebrated the 25th anniversary of its foundation in 1986 with much fanfare. Archbishop Antonio Mabutas of Davao, the first ordinary, presided over the opening Eucharist. The San Lorenzo Medical and Dental Charity Clinic was also inaugurated to serve the indigents who need medical and dental treatment. About the same year, the Foyer de Charite in the compound of the St. Mary's Seminary was slowly rising to serve as a retreat house for the diocese.

In 1994, Bishop Abaya convoked the First Diocese of Laoag Pastoral Assembly. This was in response to the renewal of the Philippines called for by the Second Plenary Council of the Philippines in 1991. This was a week-long gathering of clergy, religious and lay faithful of the diocese to pray, to reflect on the pastoral situation and to offer solutions and remedies. It was geared towards creating a community of disciples in the Diocese of Laoag. The Vision-Mission Statement with the Acts and Decrees of the Pastoral Assembly reflects the pastoral situation of the diocese and the kind of response to be addressed to such.

Bishop Abaya's episcopal ministry in the Diocese of Laoag came to an end when he was installed as the Archbishop of Nueva Segovia on September 8, 1999. The diocese was again without a pastor. The months of interregnum were under the leadership of the Rev. Rodolfo R. Nicolas, who served as administrator for 16 months.

== Ernesto Salgado: "I have a dream" ==
On January 30, 2001, Bishop Ernesto A. Salgado] became the fourth Bishop of Laoag. A native of Sta. Lucia, Ilocos Sur, he was originally a priest of Nueva Segovia. When he took possession of the See of Laoag he was already a veteran in the mountain missions of the Cordilleras having served as Apostolic Vicar of the Mountain Provinces for 14 years.

Bishop Salgado steered the 40th anniversary celebration of the diocese of Laoag with "The Church as Mystery of Communion" as its theme. The celebration was held on July 28, 2001, a Saturday, to allow more faithful in the celebration. The biblical exegete Fr. Gerardo Tapiador was the main speaker.

There are three things the Bishop Salgado wanted to do in his Episcopal ministry in the diocese of Laoag. First is the security of priests to make them veritable servant-leaders of this particular church. Priestly solidarity and fraternity was the second, to create a community of servant-leaders reminiscent of the primitive Christian community in Jerusalem. And the third was the formation of Basic Ecclesial Communities (BEC) to create a community of disciples.

Indeed, this was a gargantuan task. But the life of the priests and the faithful is what makes the Church. Talis sacerdos, quails grex, so the old Latin Maxim goes. A dedicated and unified presbyterium would be the first witnessing of the priests towards BEC. Basic Ecclesial Communities could only endure for as long as they are served by dedicated and selfless priests.

Four new parishes were erected during Bishop Salgado's term: St. Francis of Assisi in Davila, which was carved out of St. James in Pasuquin; Our Lady of Fatima in Cadaratan from St. Andrew in Bacarra; Divine Mercy in Pila, comprising the 10 barrios in the northwestern portion of Laoag; and, St. John Bosco in Baresbes, covering three barrios at the eastern side of Dingras. St. Joseph the Worker in Carasi was being prepared but events did not permit its formal erection as parish during the tenure of Bishop Salgado.

After much rev up, Bishop Salgado was still taking off when he was named to his mother see, the Archdiocese of Nueva Segovia, which he took possession on May 31, 2005. The former Vicar General, the Rev. Jacinto A. Jose, was elected by the Board of Consultors as the diocesan administrator. He could not wait for the coming of the new Bishop of Laoag, though. He was ordained Bishop of Urdaneta on November 26, 2005. The Rev. Policarpo M. Albano continued to steer the diocese in the months of vacancy.

== Sergio Utleg: "Climb every mountain" ==
The diocese was sede vacante for 16 months. On November 13, 2006, the then ordinary of Ilagan (Isabela) Bishop Sergio Lasam Utleg was named to the See of Laoag. Bishop Utleg was formerly a priest of the Archdiocese of Tuguegarao, being a native of Solana, Cagayan. He was appointed coadjutor Bishop of Ilagan in 1996 and eventually took possession of the see a couple of years later. The appointment of Bishop Utleg to the See of Laoag is a homecoming of sort. His paternal grandfather was a native of Laoag who migrated to Cagayan. He was installed the fifth Bishop of Laoag on January 11, 2007.

To prepare for the forthcoming reshuffle of priest's assignment and to have a firsthand knowledge of the whole diocese, Bishop Utleg immediately embarked on a pastoral visit. This commenced in February and completed in September 2007. The bishop's advocacy for environmental protection was immediately made manifest. He is practically making waves with the mountain climbing that he organizes to conquer the highest peaks of Ilocos Norte: Mt. Siminublan in Nueva Era, Mt. Masadsadoc in Vintar, Pico de Loro in the boundary of Pagudpud and Adams. Cycling buffs flock to him in his trek of the highways and the byways of the province.

The general reshuffle of priests’ assignments went through in April 2008, thus continuing a tradition of periodic transfer since 1973. Diocesan commissions were reorganized and the parish councils are being given a new direction with a uniform constitution and by-laws to be adopted in the whole diocese. Streamlining of the financial management of the parishes is now being prepared to adopt a uniform system thus paving the way towards a standardized remuneration of the clergy.

The 50th anniversary of the foundation of the Diocese of Laoag was celebrated in the year 2011. Bishop Utleg has laid down the groundwork for the celebration. He tasked the presbyterium to craft a five-year diocesan pastoral plan. The 1994 First Diocese of Laoag Pastoral Assembly was revisited for a reorientation to the present pastoral needs of this particular church. On June 4–5, 2011, the diocese celebrated the highlights of the Golden Jubilee Year with the inauguration of the Museo Diocesano de Laoag located at Sta. Monica Parish in Sarrat. The Vatican granted plenary indulgences to the faithful who visit the churches of Dingras, Paoay, Bangui, Sarrat, the Shrine of Our Lady, Cause of our Joy in Badoc and the Laoag Cathedral.

Bishop Utleg also envisioned a college seminary of philosophy to be put up in the diocese.

About a week after the celebration, the Holy See appointed Bishop Utleg as Archbishop of Tuguegarao.

== Renato Mayugba: A seminary professor at the helm ==
On October 12, 2012, Pope Benedict XVI appointed Most Rev. Renato P. Mayugba, then Auxiliary Bishop of Roman Catholic Archdiocese of Lingayen-Dagupan, as the 6th Bishop of the diocese.

He continued the vision of the previous bishop and under his administration the seminary building of Mary Cause of Our Joy College Seminary was erected in Bacarra, Ilocos Norte.

Under his watch, the faithful witnessed the Pontifical Coronation of La Virgen Milagrosa de Badoc on May 31, 2018, by Cardinal Luís Antonio Tagle, then Archbishop of Manila. Few months later, on February 5, 2019, in a solemn rite, the shrine of the miraculous image in Badoc was elevated into a Minor Basilica, as mandated by the Holy See. On July 21, 2020, the bishop approved the declaration of the parish church of San Nicolás in San Nicolás town as a Diocesan Shrine. The title was conferred on September 10, 2020, the patronal feast of the town.

== See also ==
- Catholic Church in the Philippines
- List of Catholic dioceses in the Philippines
