= Candon =

Component city in Ilocos Sur, Philippines

- Component city
- City of Candon
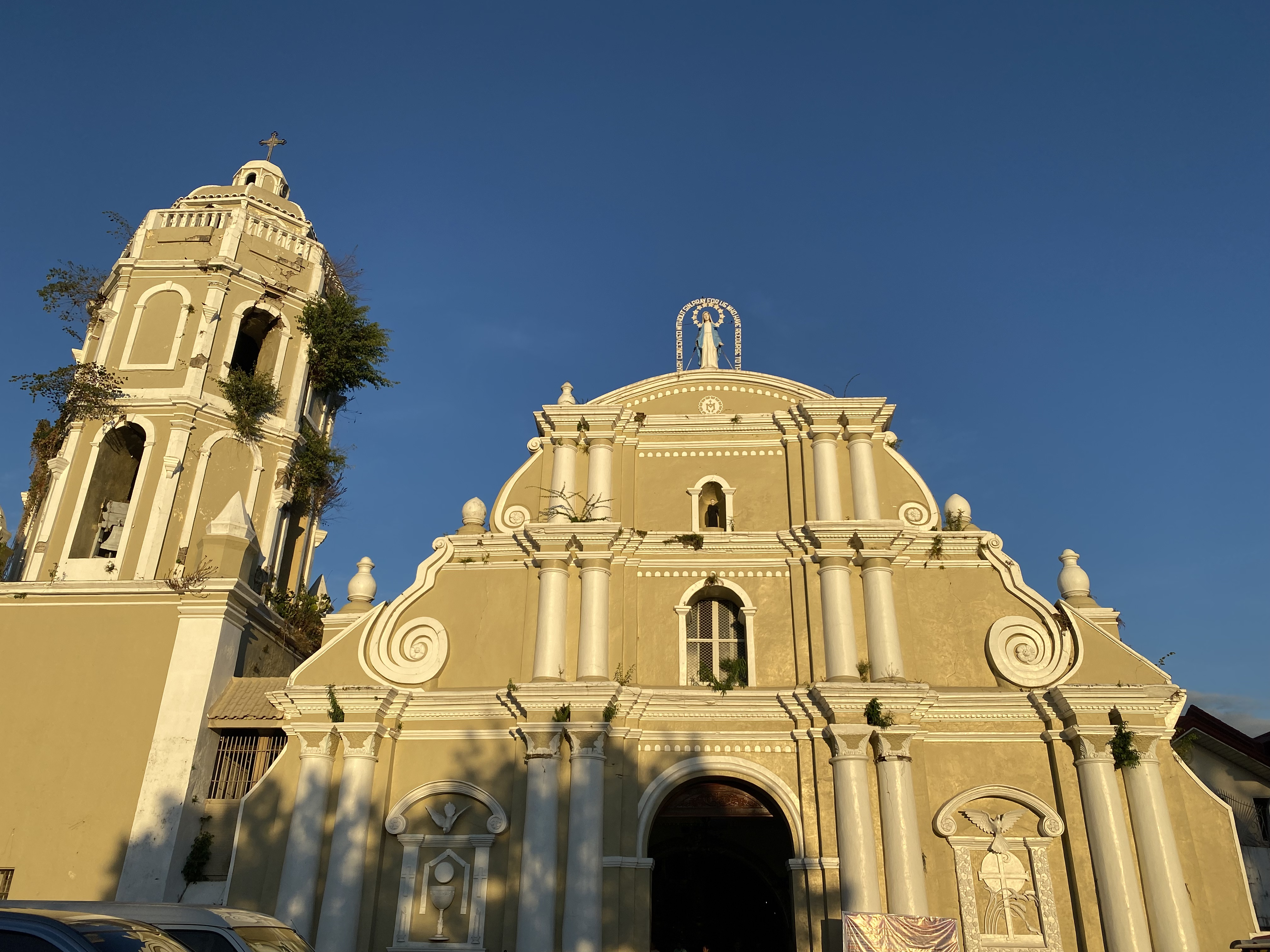
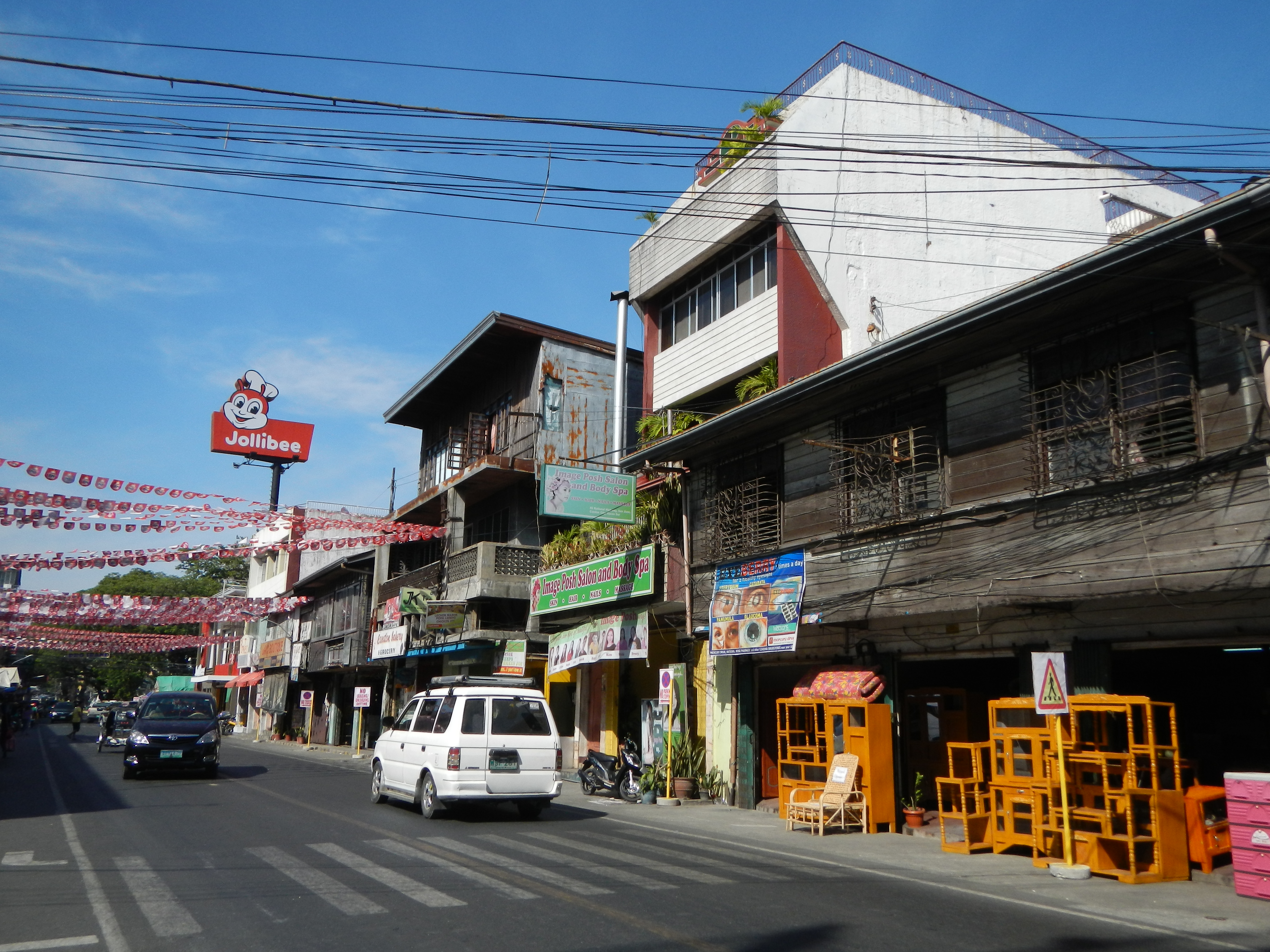
- Candon Church MacArthur Highway along the city center Darapidap beach sunset

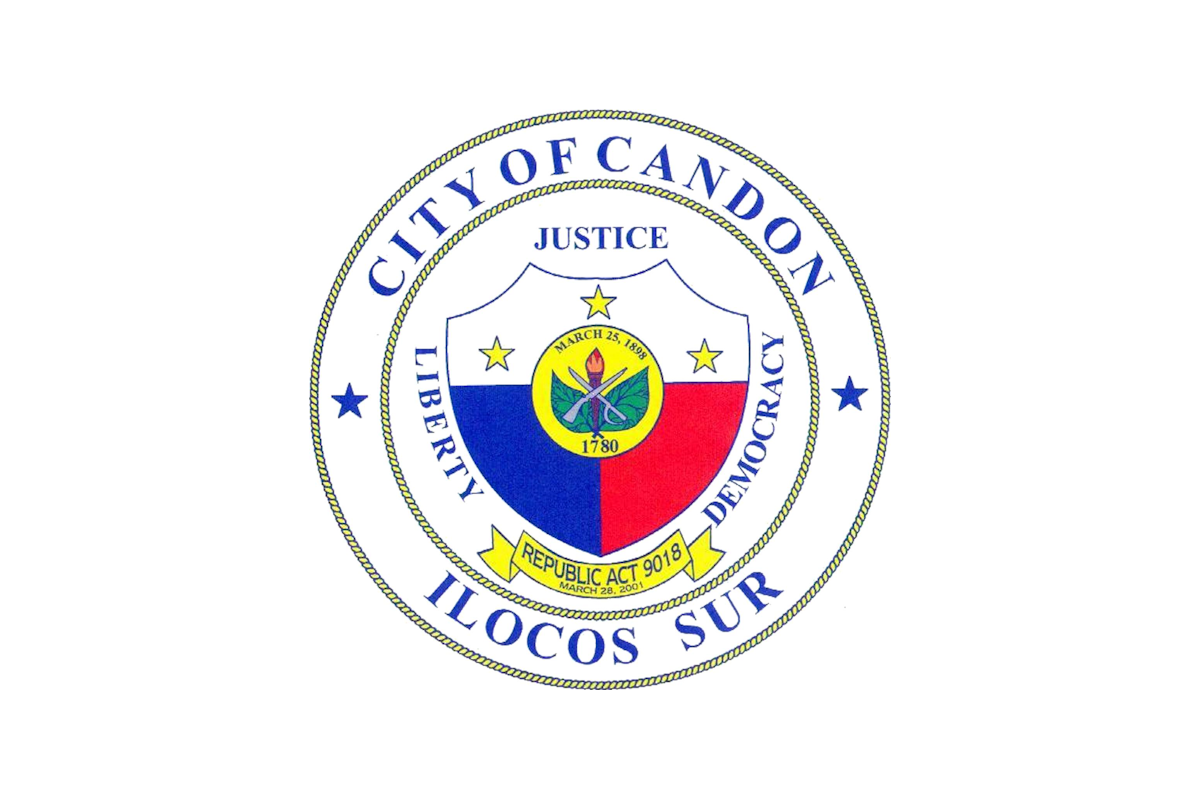
- Flag Seal
- Nickname: Tobacco Capital of the Philippines
- Motto: Liberty, Justice and Unity
- Anthem: Cry of Candon
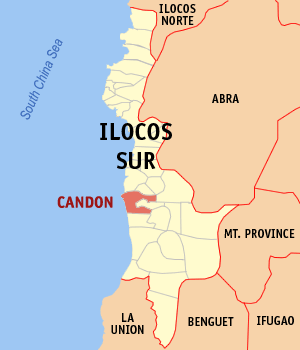
- Map of Ilocos Sur with Candon highlighted
- Interactive map of Candon
- Location within the Philippines
- Coordinates: 17°11′45″N 120°26′56″E
- Country: Philippines
- Region: Ilocos Region
- Province: Ilocos Sur
- District: 2nd district
- Founded: 1780
- Cityhood: March 28, 2001
- Barangays: 42 (see Barangays)

Government
  - Type: Sangguniang Panlungsod
  - Mayor: Eric Dario Singson
  - Vice Mayor: Kristelle G. Singson
  - Representative: Kristine Singson-Meehan
  - City Council: Members: Alfonso D. Singson; Robert B. Tudayan; Aileen Rhoda I. Acal; Angela C. Itchon; Lerisa M. Llanes; Joanne Ascencion G. Valdez; George T. Valdez; David D. Wagayen; Oscar Materno L. Balagot; Godofredo F. Abrero
  - Electorate: 39,382 voters (2025)

Area
  - Total: 103.28 km^{2} (39.88 sq mi)
- Elevation: 67 m (220 ft)
- Highest elevation: 1,035 m (3,396 ft)
- Lowest elevation: 0 m (0 ft)

Population (2024 census)
  - Total: 61,315
  - Density: 593.68/km^{2} (1,537.6/sq mi)
  - Households: 15,125
- Demonyms: Candoneño (male); Candoneña (female)

Economy
  - Income class: 1st city income class
  - Poverty incidence: 5.67% (2023)
  - Revenue: ₱ 2,463 million (2024)
  - Assets: ₱ 8,152 million (2024)
  - Expenditure: ₱ 1,070 million (2024)
  - Liabilities: ₱ 797.5 million (2024)

Service provider
  - Electricity: Ilocos Sur Electric Cooperative (ISECO)
- Time zone: UTC+8 (PST)
- ZIP code: 2710
- PSGC: 0102906000
- IDD : area code: +63 (0)77
- Native languages: Ilocano; Tagalog
- Feast date: June 12
- Catholic diocese: Archdiocese of Nueva Segovia
- Patron saint: John of Sahagún
- Website: candoncity.gov.ph

Candon, officially the City of Candon (Ilocano: Siudad ti Candon; Filipino: Lungsod ng Candon), is a component city in the province of Ilocos Sur, Philippines. According to the 2024 census, it has a population of 61,315 people, thus surpassing the provincial capital Vigan as the most populated city in the province.

Dubbed the "Tobacco Capital of the Philippines", the city is the country's largest producer of Virginia tobacco.

The town is known for making the world's heaviest and largest kalamay, a sweet and viscous snack made from sticky rice, coconut milk, and sugar. This city also has a rich historical background. In its legends, the name of the city is derived from the legendary "kandong" tree which is almost extinct in the area. Its patron saint is John of Sahagún whose feast day is celebrated on June 12.

Candon is the center of the 2nd district of Ilocos Sur and also the most populous city in that province. Government district offices are all located in the city, supporting more than 100,000 residents in terms of commercial and industrial services.

== Etymology ==
The origin of the name of Candon is unknown. The name was rendered as Candón or Candon in old Spanish records. It might be named after the Spanish municipality of Candón in Huelva, Andalucia; or from a Hispanicization of Ilocano kandong (Cyrtophyllum fragrans), a native species of tree with very hard wood also known as agandong or urandong in other places in the Ilocos region.

== History ==
Historically, during the pre-colonial period, Candon was a coastal trading settlement frequented by trade ships of Austronesian, Arab, Indian, Chinese, and Japanese traders (similar to other trading towns along the Ilocos region like Aparri, Lingayen, and Vigan).

The settlement also had a long history of trading ties with Cordillerans in the highlands of Luzon, which continued through the Spanish colonial period. The town of Candon features prominently in the accounts of Biag, the legendary 17th century folk hero and founder of Sagada. Candon also hosted missionaries who were converting the Itneg and other Cordilleran peoples in neighboring regions.

The history of Candon in the early Spanish period is hazy. The first church in the settlement was established by an Augustinian mission in 1591. According to modern folklore, this church was built near a kandong tree, which is supposedly the origin of the name of the city. The church was later replaced with the Candon Church in 1695. Candon Church was damaged by an earthquake in 1707 and was restored in 1713. The church graveyard located south of the Población was opened in 1797.

The settlement was organized into a municipality in 1780. The first civil government was established under the cabeza de barangay Don Juan P. Madarang by the Augustinian friar Mariano de Conquera. In the Diccionario geográfico, estadístico, histórico de las Islas Filipinas (Buzeta & Bravo, 1850–1851), Candon was described as being a city of around 3,000 households, with a port and a military fort named "San Martín de Tiagán". Candon was mainly agricultural. Its products consisted of rice, corn, sugarcane, vegetables, and fruits. It also had a cotton and indigo industry, as well as a livestock industry.

Ikkis ti Candon / Sigaw ng Candon monument, commemorating the March 25, 1898 takeover of the city by Isabelo Abaya

During the Philippine Revolution, Candon started forming local revolutionary groups in 1896. They planned to overthrow the local government by April 1, 1898. However, their plans were discovered when one of their members was captured by Spanish forces, forcing them to launch a premature assault. On March 25, 1898, the revolutionaries led by Isabelo Abaya attacked the Spanish garrison in Candon and managed to take the town. Abaya established the Republica de Filipinas Katipunan de Candon, a revolutionary government, and declared independence from the Spanish colonial government.

The Spanish colonial government retaliated by deploying the Cazadores, elite Spanish expeditionary troops. The better-trained and heavily armed Spanish forces retook Candon and the rebels were arrested and summarily executed.

During the Japanese Occupation in the Second World War, another revolution was staged. Several truckloads of Imperial Japanese forces and supplies perished along the national highway. However, the Japanese soldiers retaliated by burning the whole town in January 1942.

Despite the hardships that the townsfolk went through during the war, residents resolved to rebuild. Tall acacia trees at the town plaza and municipal buildings are testimonies to the people's steadfastness, with large trees up to 15 meters high and 20 feet in circumference now line the National Highway in the Población.

=== Cityhood ===
Candon became a legally-designated city following a plebiscite in 2001.

== Geography ==
Candon is situated in the lower central portion of the province of Ilocos Sur. It has a C-shape with elevations ranging from 10 – 500ft above sea level.

Candon is situated 60.19 kilometres (37.40 mi) from the provincial capital Vigan City, and 343.19 kilometres (213.25 mi) from the country's capital city of Manila.

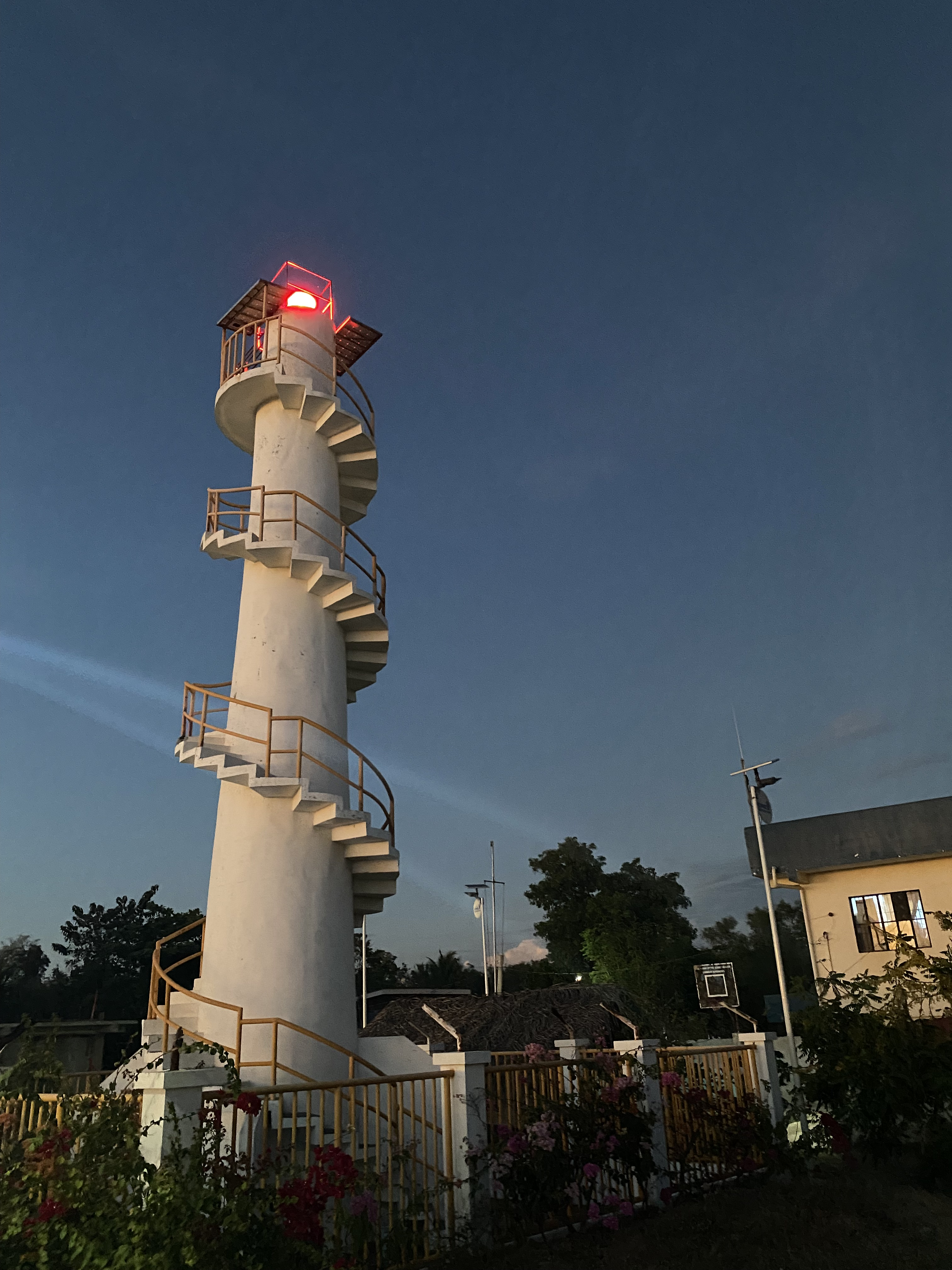
Lighthouse at Brgy. Darapidap

=== Barangays ===
Candon is politically subdivided into 42 barangays. Each barangay consists of puroks and some have sitios. It is bordered by Santiago, Banayoyo, Lidlidda, and San Emilio to the north, Galimuyod to the northeast, Salcedo to the west, and Santa Lucia to the south.

- Allangigan Primero
- Allangigan Segundo
- Amguid
- Ayudante
- Bagani Camposanto
- Bagani Gabor
- Bagani Tocgo
- Bagani Ubbog
- Bagar
- Balingaoan
- Bugnay
- Calaoaan
- Calongbuyan
- Caterman
- Cubcubboot
- Darapidap
- Langlangca Primero
- Langlangca Segundo
- Oaig-Daya
- Palacapac
- Paras
- Parioc Primero
- Parioc Segundo
- Patpata Primero
- Patpata Segundo
- Paypayad
- Salvador Primero
- Salvador Segundo
- San Agustin
- San Andres
- San Antonio (Población)
- San Isidro (Población)
- San Jose (Población)
- San Juan (Población)
- San Nicolas
- San Pedro
- Santo Tomas
- Tablac
- Talogtog
- Tamurong Primero
- Tamurong Segundo
- Villarica

=== Climate ===
The climate is generally dry that usually occurs from the months of October to May. However, the southernmost portion is observed to be humid and rain is evenly distributed throughout the year while the eastern part is dry with rain not sufficiently distributed. August has the most rainfall while January and February have the least. The mean temperature in the province is 27 °C (81 °F). January is the coldest.

Climate data for Candon City, Ilocos Sur
Month	Jan	Feb	Mar	Apr	May	Jun	Jul	Aug	Sep	Oct	Nov	Dec	Year
Mean daily maximum °C (°F)	30 (86)	31 (88)	33 (91)	34 (93)	33 (91)	31 (88)	30 (86)	30 (86)	30 (86)	31 (88)	31 (88)	30 (86)	31 (88)
Mean daily minimum °C (°F)	19 (66)	20 (68)	21 (70)	23 (73)	25 (77)	25 (77)	25 (77)	25 (77)	24 (75)	22 (72)	21 (70)	20 (68)	23 (73)
Average precipitation mm (inches)	10 (0.4)	10 (0.4)	14 (0.6)	23 (0.9)	80 (3.1)	103 (4.1)	121 (4.8)	111 (4.4)	119 (4.7)	144 (5.7)	39 (1.5)	15 (0.6)	789 (31.2)
Average rainy days	5.2	3.9	6.2	9.1	18.5	21.4	22.9	19.8	19.8	16.2	10.5	6.1	159.6
Source: Meteoblue (modeled/calculated data, not measured locally)

== Demographics ==
Population census of Candon

Year	Pop.	±% p.a.
1903	18,828	—
1918	19,950	+0.39%
1939	20,528	+0.14%
1948	22,362	+0.96%
1960	27,780	+1.82%
1970	31,116	+1.14%

Year	Pop.	±% p.a.
1975	34,701	+2.21%
1980	36,802	+1.18%
1990	43,473	+1.68%
1995	45,128	+0.70%
2000	50,564	+2.47%
2007	56,270	+1.49%

Year	Pop.	±% p.a.
2010	57,884	+1.03%
2015	60,623	+0.88%
2020	61,432	+0.28%
2024	61,315	−0.05%

Source: Philippine Statistics Authority

In the 2024 census, the population of Candon was 61,315 people, with a density of 590 inhabitants per square kilometre or 1,500 inhabitants per square mile.

=== Language ===
The dominant language spoken in Candon is Ilocano.

=== Religion ===
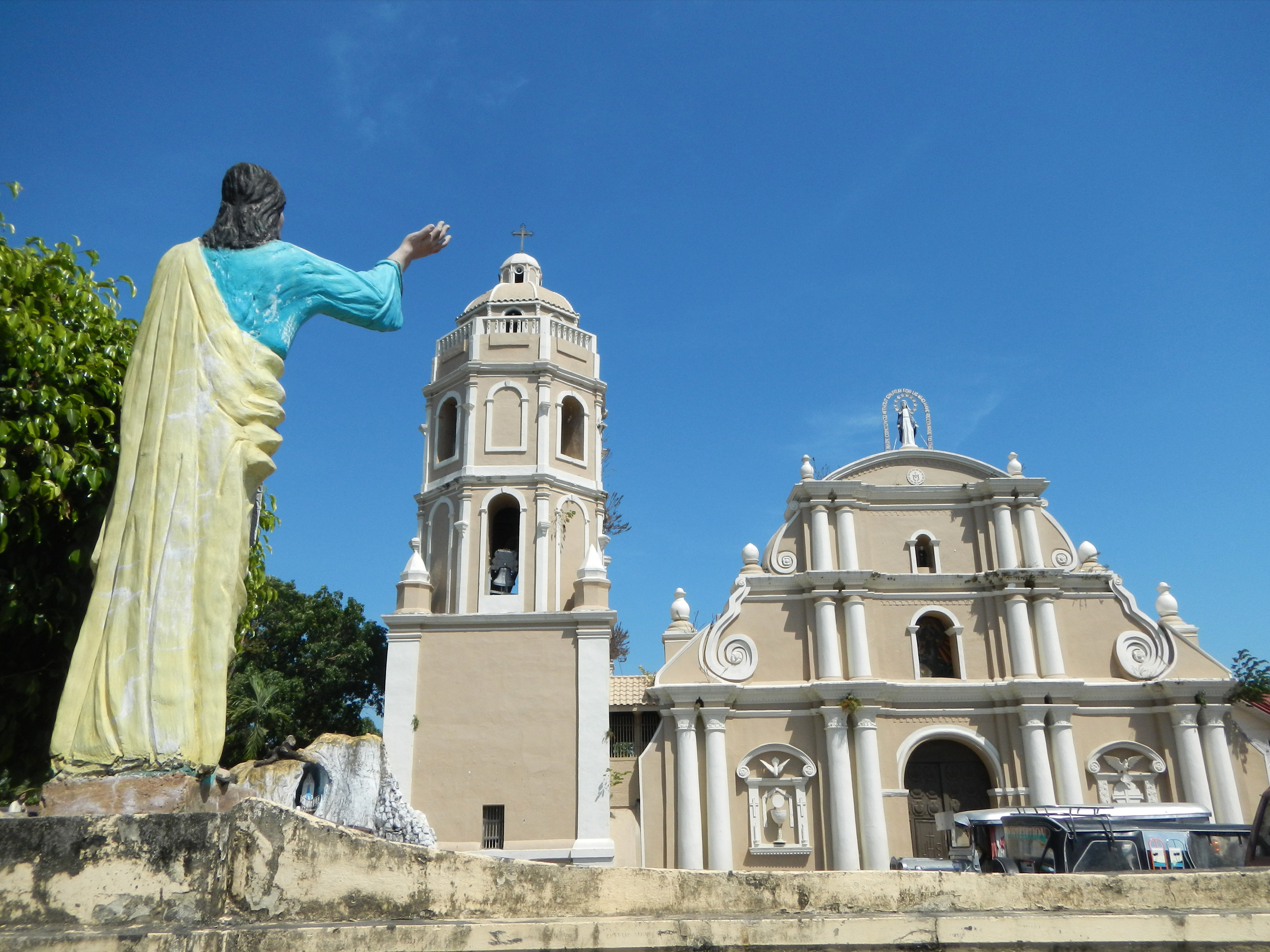
Candon Church Facade

Candon City, located in the province of Ilocos Sur, is predominantly Christian, reflecting its strong religious heritage rooted in Spanish colonial influence and diverse faith traditions.

Religious Demographics

According to the 2015 data from the Philippine Statistics Authority (PSA) and the National Statistics Office (NSO), the religious composition of the city is as follows:

- Roman Catholicism – 82.11%
- Iglesia ni Cristo – 10.45%
- Protestantism – 4.12%
- Other Christian denominations – 3.32%
- Islam – 1–2%
- Indigenous or traditional beliefs – Less than 1%

== Economy ==
Poverty incidence of Candon (%)

Source: Philippine Statistics Authority

Candon has a geographical setting and proximity to the national highway and other towns that encouraged greater mobility in terms of trade, economic, social and cultural activities. The Department of Trade and Industry termed the city as the "Center for Trade and Commerce" in Ilocos Sur.

Existing industries in Candon are manufacturing, agro-industry and cottage industry. The manufacturing sector owns the Tobacco Stalk Cement Bonded Board Plant that produces particle boards for low cost housing and other construction needs. Other manufacturing establishments are based on kalamay-making, chichacorn (deep-fried corn), baked goods, ice cream, and vinegar; furniture making, concrete products manufacturing, and a coconut oil processing plant located at Barangay Talogtog. On the other hand, cottage industries include balut egg production, fish re-drying, salt making, native delicacies, woodcraft and handicraft.

Candon kalamay, a local delicacy

The city is the center of trade and commerce in the 2nd district of Ilocos Sur. Urban growth has a linear pattern along major thoroughfares in the city center and the national highway.

== Government ==
Candon City Hall

=== Local government ===
Candon, belonging to the second congressional district of the province of Ilocos Sur, is governed by a mayor designated as its local chief executive and by a city council as its legislative body in accordance with the Local Government Code. The mayor, vice mayor, and the councilors are elected directly by the people through an election which is being held every three years.

=== Elected officials ===
Members of the Candon City Council (2025–2028)
Position	Name
District Representative (2nd Legislative District the province of Ilocos Sur)	Kristine Singson-Meehan
Chief Executive of the City of Candon	Mayor Eric D. Singson
Presiding Officer of the City Council of Candon	Vice-Mayor Kristelle G. Singson
Councilors of the City of Candon	Jaime M. Singson
Councilors of the City of Candon	Vincent Jan N. Tudayan
Councilors of the City of Candon	Rolando P. Toquero
Councilors of the City of Candon	Eric Owen G. Singson Jr.
Councilors of the City of Candon	Lerisa M. Llanes
Councilors of the City of Candon	George T. Valdez
Councilors of the City of Candon	Johnny Nestor R. Itchon
Councilors of the City of Candon	Caren Joy G. Lozano
Councilors of the City of Candon	Oseas I. Diasen
Councilors of the City of Candon	Aristeo V. Valdez

City Seal of Candon

=== City seal ===
The official seal of the City of Candon was approved and adopted by the Sangguniang Panlungsod under Resolution No. 017-01 sponsored by Councilor David Gacusana. It is published to immortalize the “Cry of Candon” led by Don Isabelo Abaya of March 1898 and to commemorate the ratification of its Cityhood charter under Republic Act 9018 on March 28, 2001.

== Tourism ==
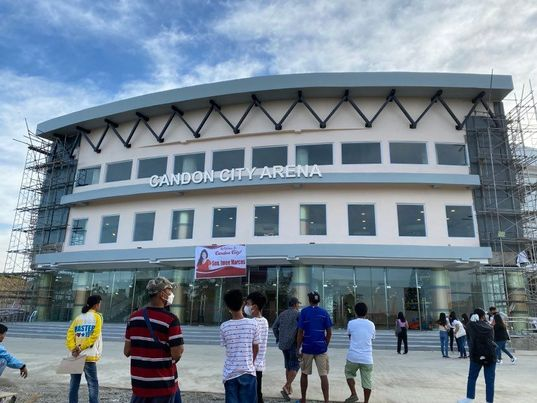
Candon City Arena

=== Places of Interest ===
- Candon Church (Saint John de Sahagun Parish Church)
- Candon City Arena - Opened in 2023, the 8,000-seater arena has hosted various sporting events and concerts.
- Candon City Aquarium and Park - opened in 2025, the aquarium is the first of its kind in Ilocos Sur and features a wide variety of marine life such as stingrays and coral reefs.
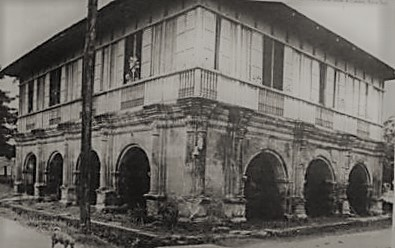
- Cariño Ancestral House
  Cariño Ancestral House - built in the 1700s, the bahay na bato originally belonged to Don Miguel Cariño, the grandfather of revolutionary leader Gabriela Silang. It underwent thorough renovation and was inaugurated as the Candon City Museum in 2019.
- Darapidap Beach

=== Festivals ===
- Tobacco Festival - Celebrated every month of March as thanksgiving for the city's vast harvest of tobacco
- Feria de Candon (Trade Fair) - held every first week of December in honor of Santa Barbara (December 4)

Candon Bus Line

== Transportation ==
Candon is accessible via the MacArthur National Highway which is also the city's main thoroughfare. Other major streets in the city are 25 de Marzo Street and San Juan Street, both parallel to the National Highway. Quirino Boulevard is a secondary highway that connects the city proper to the upland barangays of Candon and the upland municipalities of Ilocos Sur. The Darapidap Beach Road or the Samonte Boulevard where you can find the Mosque aside of it. This Road connects the seaside barangays to the urban center.

Tricycles and jeepneys are the major types of transportation in the city. There are over 3000 registered tricycles in the city, the highest number of registered tricycles in the province (as an individual local government unit.)

Buses provide long-distance trips to major cities like Manila, Baguio and Laoag. Mini-Buses provide short trips to neighboring municipalities and the nearby cities of Vigan and San Fernando, La Union. Major Bus Companies also established their terminals in the city, among them are:

- Partas
- Dominion Bus Lines
- Santa Lucia Express and Martinez Trans (managed by Victory Liner)
- Candon Bus Line
- Viron Transit
- Inocencio Aniceto Transportation
- Fariñas Transit Company
- GV Florida Transport

== Education ==
The Candon City Schools Division Office oversees the operations of all Schools District Offices within the city. The Division Office is managed by the Department of Education (DepEd). There are two schools district offices (SDOs), namely: Candon City District I Schools District Office, and Candon City District II Schools District Office. They govern the operations of all private and public elementary and high schools throughout the city. Tertiary levels are governed by the Commission on Higher Education (CHED).

=== Primary and elementary schools ===
- Allangigan Elementary School
- Amguid Elementary School
- Ayudante Elementary School
- Bagani Elementary School
- Bagani-Tocgo Elementary School
- Bagar Elementary School
- Balingaoan Elementary School
- Bugnay Elementary School
- Cabanela Preschool Center
- Calaoa-an Elementary School
- Calongbuyan Elementary School
- Candon North Central School
- Candon South Central School
- Candon South Central School SPED Center
- Caterman Elementary School
- Caterman Mt. Zion Academy
- Cubcubbuot Elementary School
- Filomeno G. Gagarin Elementary School
- Darapidap Elementary School
- Langlangca Elementary School
- Maranatha Christian Academy (Elementary)
- Nicosat Colleges (Elementary)
- Oaig-Daya Elementary School
- Parioc East Elementary School
- Parioc Elementary School
- Patpata Elementary School
- Paypayad Elementary School
- Salvador Elementary School
- San Andres Adventist Elementary School
- San Juan de Sahagun (Parish) Pre-School Formation Center
- St. Cecilia Early Learning Center (Elementary)
- St. Joseph's Institute (Elementary)
- Sto. Tomas Elementary School
- Tablac Elementary School
- Talogtog Elementary School
- Tamurong Elementary School
- The Shepherd Kiddie School
- The Sto. Tomas UMC Children's Garden Learning Center
- Ubbog Elementary School
- UCCP - Nursery Kindergarten School

=== Secondary schools ===
- Candon City High School
- Candon City Information Technology National High School
- Candon National High School
- Dr. Ricardo Gacula Memorial National High School
- Maranatha Christian Academy
- Nicosat Colleges (High School)
- St. Cecilia Early Learning Center
- St. Joseph's Institute
- Sto. Tomas National High School

=== Higher educational institutions ===
Saint Joseph Institute

- Ilocos Sur Polytechnic State College (ISPSC)
- Nicosat Colleges
- North Luzon Philippines State College - Formerly a campus of the University of Northern Philippines, founded as the Candon Community College before its merger with UNP by virtue of a bill enacted by then Congressman Eric Singson.
- Saint Joseph Institute - a co-ed private school owned and administered by the Sisters of St. Paul of Chartres.

== Media ==
=== AM stations ===
- DZTP 693 kHz Tirad Pass Broadcasting Network

=== FM stations ===
- DWRE 104.5 Radyo Natin

== Sister Cities ==
- Honolulu, Hawaii, United States
- Baguio, Philippines

== Notable people ==
- Eric Singson, ex politician.
