= Candon (disambiguation) =

Candon may refer to:

== Places ==
- Candon, Component city in Ilocos Sur, Philippines
  - Candon Church

== People ==
- Emma Mieko Candon, American novelist
- Mark Candon (1952–2023), American politician
- Attracta Rewcastle (née Candon) (1897–1951), doctor, politician, and the first female Commissioned Officer in the Royal Navy
