= Fariñas Transit Company =

Bus company in the Philippines

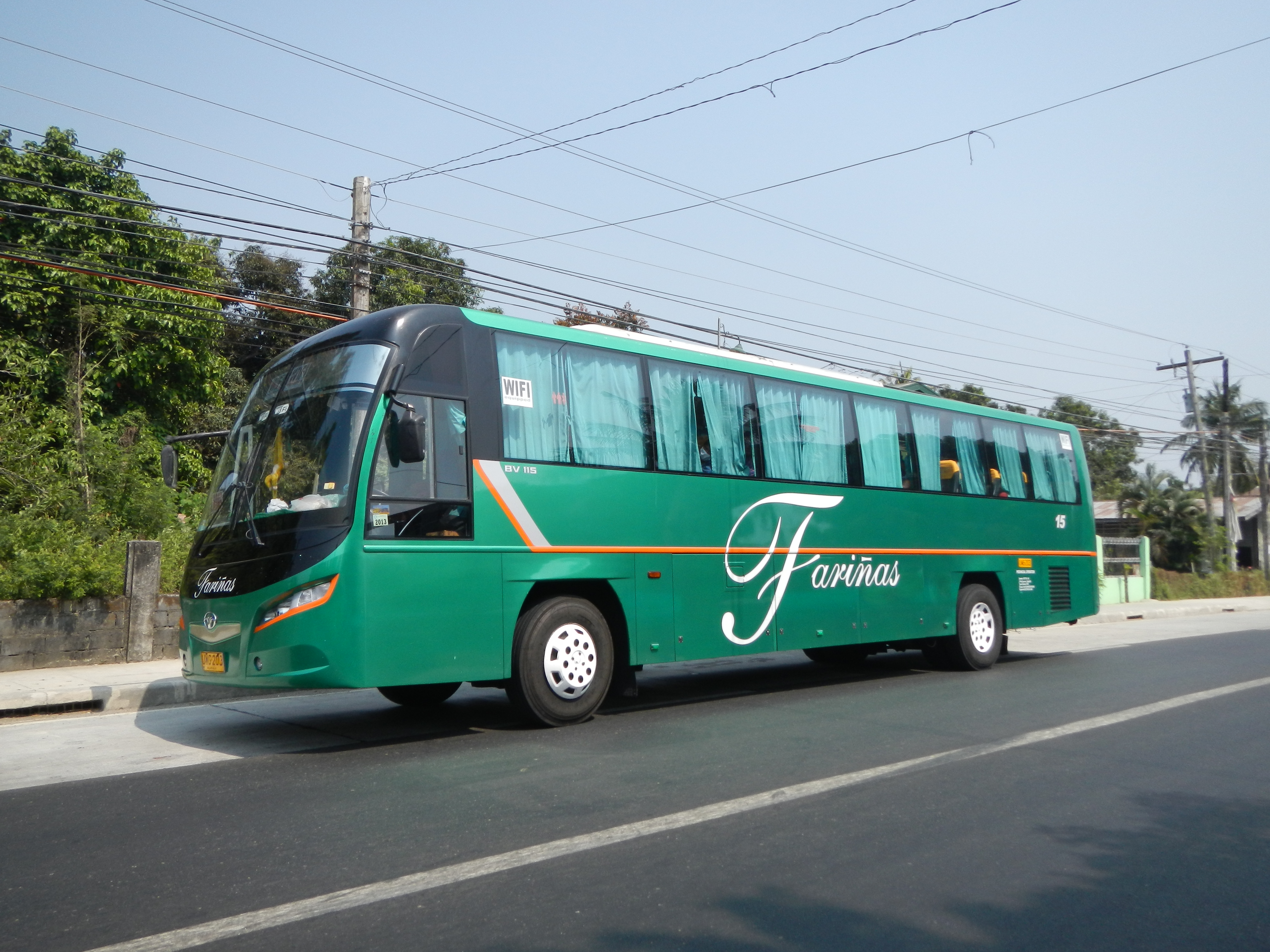
- Fariñas Bus in Agoo, La Union
- Founded: 1955; 71 years ago
- Headquarters: Brgy. 55A Barit, Laoag City, Ilocos Norte, Philippines
- Service area: Ilocos Region
- Service type: Provincial Operation
- Destinations: Baguio; Solsona; Dingras; Sarrat; Bacarra; Pasuquin; Laoag City
- Operator: Fariñas Transit Company

Fariñas Transit Company is one of the major Philippines public transport companies connecting the Luzon provinces to the national capital in Manila. Primarily a passenger coach bus line, the main Manila terminal is in the Sampaloc district of Manila.

== Etymology ==
The bus company was named after Federico Luna Fariñas, Sr., which is believed to be one of the strongest political clans in Ilocos Norte.

== History ==
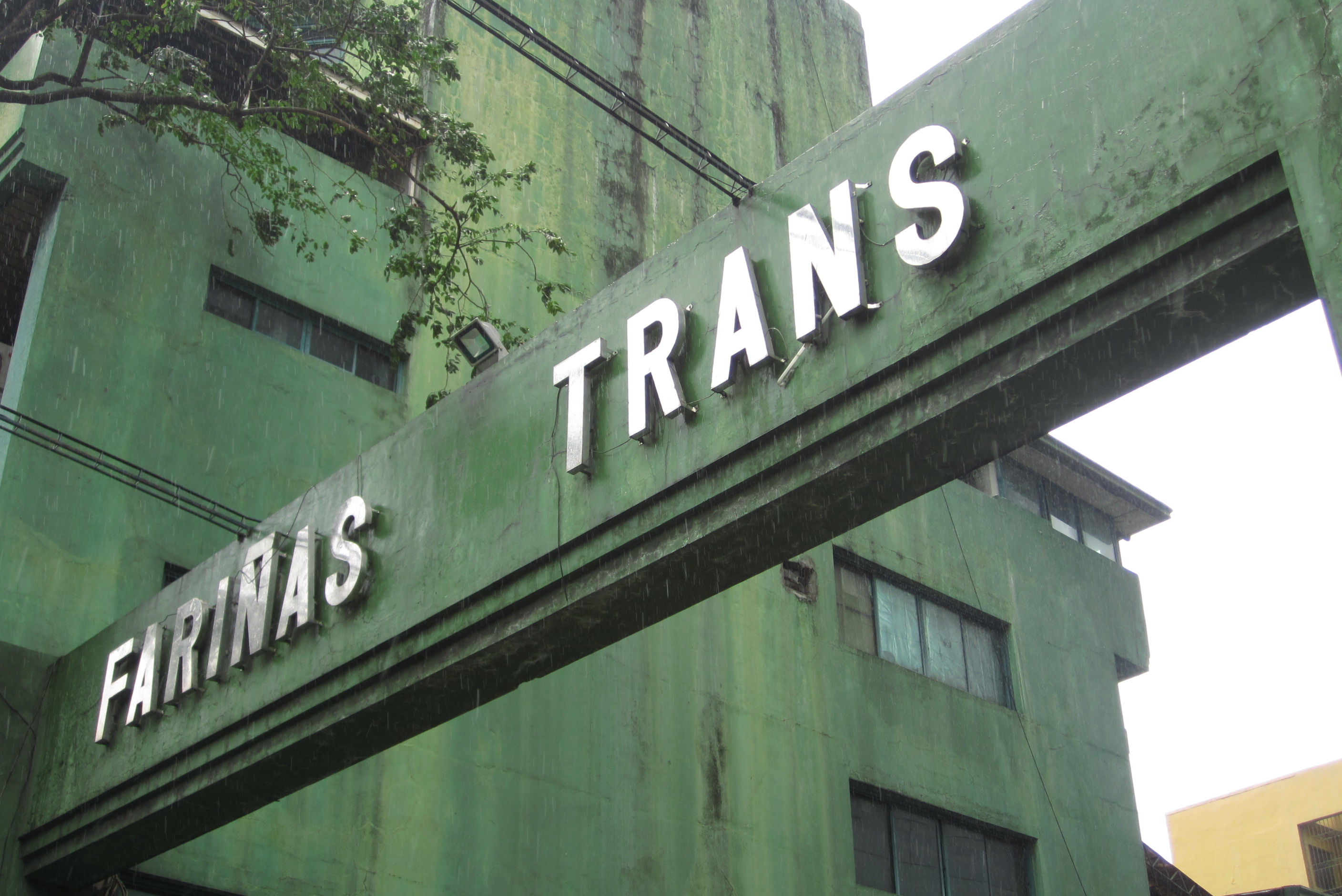
Fariñas Transit Sampaloc Terminal

Fariñas Transit, a sole family proprietorship was founded by the late Marcelo Vallejos Fariñas of Vigan, Ilocos Sur together with his wife, the late Rosa Peralta Luna of Pasuquin, Ilocos Norte.

Four years before the outbreak of the second World War in December 1941, Marcello V. Fariñas died and the management of the business fell in the shoulders of his wife and his two grown up sons Constate and Federico.

When the Japanese invaded Ilocos Norte, they began commandeering government and private vehicles including the buses of the Fariñas Transportation. The younger son, Federico was able to hide during the evasion, 2 buses in Piddig, Ilocos Norte, a remote town at the eastern part of the province. In March 1945, during the liberation, Federico brought out the 2 buses he had kept clandestinely in Piddig and the master mechanic, Federico who never had any formal education in automotive repairing or the like, was able to assemble one bus out of the 2 dilapidated buses into good running condition which he himself drove along its franchises routes from Laoag to Manila and back. These two buses became the nucleus of the biggest transportation business plying between Laoag and Manila today.

Meanwhile, Constante, the older brother, chose to pursue his studies in Manila. Thus, it was Federico who continued the transportation business. The meteoric rise of the business was due to Federico’s uncanny business acumen and management. Despite the risk encountered in the early days of the business, when insurances were not available then to pay costs of damages incurred during vehicular accidents, through basic work, personal discipline and determination, Federico together with his wife, Remedios Dreyer Castro, forged on to improve the business. Being the master mechanic that he was, he augmented his income by putting up the Fariñas Motor Shop. He bought condemned government equipment like bulldozers, pay loaders, and dump trucks, repaired them, and sold them at handsome prices. From here, the number of buses grew by leaps and bounds. At present, the company is maintaining 60 good working conditioned buses. Federico was the first to introduce air-conditioned buses in the province, the first to introduce comfort room in the air-conditioned buses and now the Fariñas Transportation business is the biggest transportation business in Ilocos Norte.

The bus company, which is owned by the late Federico Luna Fariñas Sr, is operated by his sons and daughters which are the Fariñas family of Ilocos Norte, a political family that has served as governors, mayors and councilmen over the course of several generations: most notably from recent news, Ilocos Norte Governor Rodolfo Fariñas and Laoag City mayors Roger and Michael V. Fariñas. Two of its rival transportation companies in the Ilocos Region are owned and operated by other political families: the Singsons of Ilocos Sur and the Marcos family of Ilocos Norte.

Rival transportation companies include Partas, GV Florida Transport, Dominion Bus Lines (formerly Times Transit, of the late millionaire Santiago Rondaris but now owned by MENCORP), Maria De Leon Transportation Inc. and Viron Transit (owned by the daughter of late millionaire Santiago Rondaris), even a resurgent Inocencio Aniceto Transportation (owned by the Aniceto family). Philippine Rabbit, one of their former rival transportation companies, is set to restore their Manila-Laoag route.

== Fleet ==
Fariñas Transit is now utilizing and maintaining Daewoo Bus, King Long, Volvo and Yutong buses

- Kinglong XMQ6101Y
- Kinglong XMQ6119FY
- Kinglong XMQ6127
- Kinglong XMQ6129Y
- Kinglong XMQ6998Y2
- Volvo B7R
- Volvo B8R
- Yutong ZK6118HQ
- Yutong ZK6122HD9

Note: In desire of the company to provide better service to our valued passengers, Fariñas Transit Company was currently re-fleeting of our buses and selling the following units such as 8 units King Long Bus 2012 model 41 seating capacity with comfort room fully air-conditioned & 10 units King Long 2014 model 38 seating capacity with comfort room fully air-conditioned.

== See also ==
- List of bus companies of the Philippines
