= Viron =

Viron may refer to:

- Viron P. Vaky (1925–2012), American diplomat
- an alternative form of Vyronas, a suburb of Athens, Greece
- Viron, a fictional city in The Book of the Long Sun by Gene Wolfe
- Viron, a playable race (or their language) in the computer RTS game Ground Control II: Operation Exodus
- Viron Transit, a bus company servicing the Ilocos Region, Philippines

== See also ==
- Virion, a virus particle
