= Ilocos Sur Medical Center =

Government hospital in Ilocos Sur, Philippines

Geography
- Location: Candon, Ilocos Sur, Ilocos, Philippines
- Coordinates: 17°09′56″N 120°27′05″E

Organization
- Funding: Government hospital

The Ilocos Sur Medical Center is a government hospital in the Philippines. It is located in Candon, Ilocos Sur.
