= Partas =

Bus company in the Philippines

Partas Transportation Co., Inc.

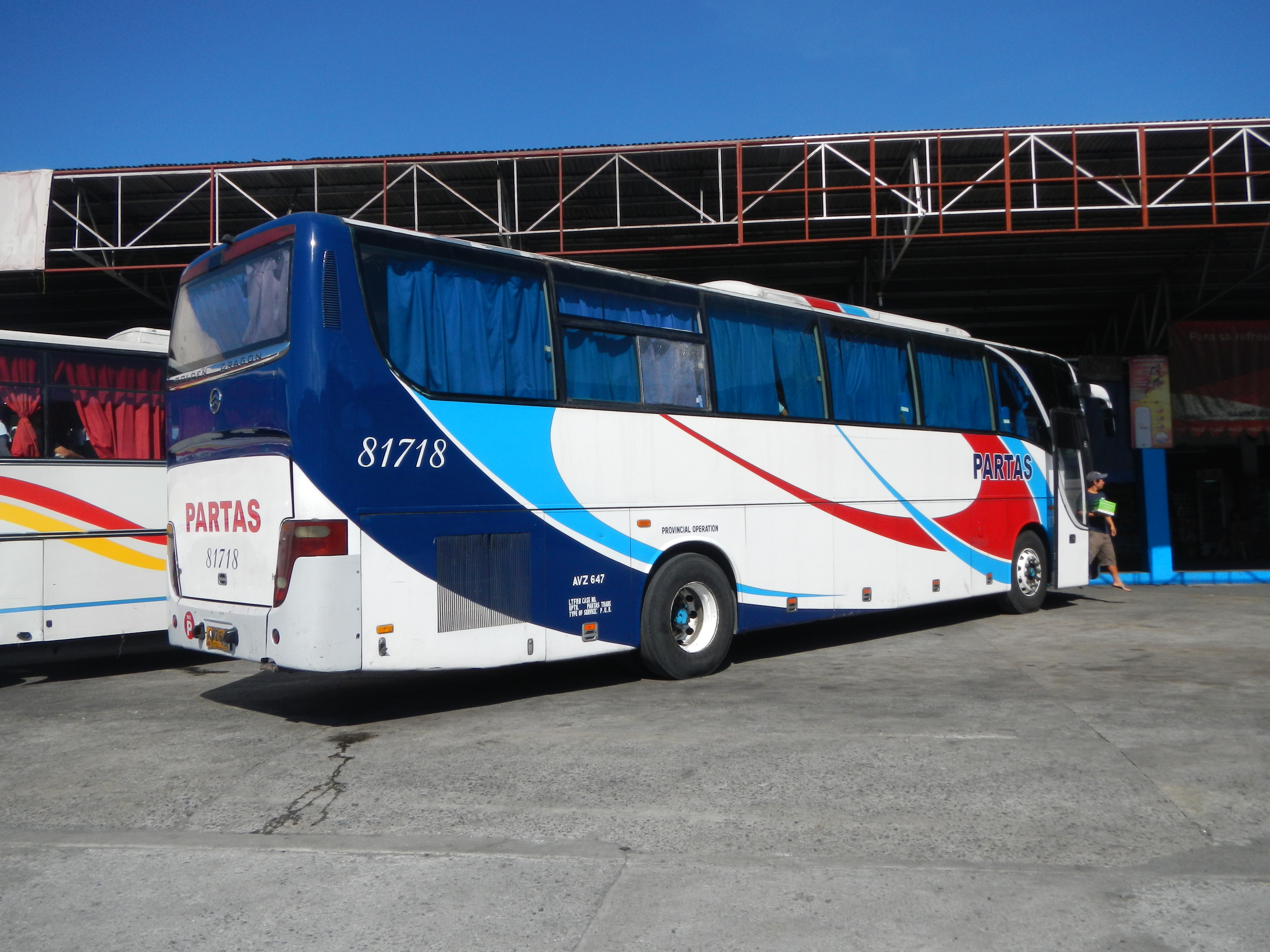
- A Partas bus parked at the Dau Mabalacat Bus Terminal, Pampanga.
- Founded: July 25, 1989; 37 years ago
- Headquarters: Cubao, Quezon City
- Locale: Luzon
- Service area: Metro Manila; Ilocos Region; Cordillera Administrative Region; Cagayan Valley; Occidental Mindoro
- Service type: Provincial Operation; Tourist Operation (as Partas Tours)
- Hubs: Cubao; Pasay; Sampaloc
- Operator: Partas Transportation Co., Inc.
- Chief executive: Chavit Singson

Partas Transportation Co., Inc. is a bus transportation company in the Philippines. It operates a 24/7 service for passengers and freight (known as "waybills") between Metro Manila and northern Luzon (the Ilocos Region and Cagayan Valley), with services also running to the Cordilleras in Baguio, Bangued in Abra, and also to the south Occidental Mindoro. Partas also offers chartered service for tour groups.

== Etymology ==
The name "Partas" was derived from the term "Satrap", an ancient Persian language word for "governor" (since Luis "Chavit" Singson, the owner, served as governor of Ilocos Sur for many years) spelled in reverse, an example of a anadrome. "Satrap" also refers to the name of the construction business owned and managed by Partas' owner/operator.

== History ==
Partas was founded on July 25, 1989, and started its operations in 1991, a time when Philippine Rabbit and rival Fariñas Transit ruled the Ilocos routes; with millionaire Santiago Rondaris' Times Transit shut down for good due to labor disputes (later became Dominion Bus Lines); and St. Joseph sidelined by hard times. Partas Bus Lines, as a company, was incorporated by Luis Chavit Singson and Rolito Go at Laoag (Ilocos Norte). Even as a new player in the industry back then, Partas has attracted the riding public with its state-of-the-art buses powered by Nissan Diesel and MAN engines; with the distinctive blue and white livery, and the Road Runner character from Looney Tunes, their standard emblem, adorning the front and sides of their buses.

Partas is one of two bus companies in the Ilocos Region to have ever fielded a double-decker bus (the other being Fariñas).

The principal provincial terminals are at Laoag, Vigan, Candon, Bangued, Baguio, San Fernando, La Union, and, starting in 2014, a sub-station in Pagudpud, Ilocos Norte.

In Metro Manila, the main hub is at Cubao, Quezon City, which deploys trips to majority of its provincial destinations, except for Baguio.

Trips to and from the majority of its provincial destinations, except for Baguio, are available via their terminal in Pasay. One of the latest routes added to Pasay terminal is Pasay to Pagudpud, Ilocos Norte, and vice versa.

The latest terminal within Metro Manila was opened in Sampaloc district of Manila. This terminal principally caters to goods traders in Binondo and Divisoria districts of Manila, and students in Manila's University Belt who hail from Laoag, Bangued, Abra and Pagudpud, Ilocos Norte.

Partas also has inter-provincial trips in Northern Luzon, running between Baguio, Vigan, Laoag, Bangued, Abra, San Fernando, La Union, Bolinao, Pangasinan, Tuguegarao, Cagayan and Santiago, Isabela.

== Fleet ==
Partas operates around 300 buses. Currently the fleet predominantly consist of imported or locally-assembled Golden Dragon and Zhongtong buses from China.

The list includes:

- Golden Dragon XML6102 "Splendour"
- Golden Dragon XML6122J38Y "Triumph II"
- Golden Dragon XML6103 "Phoenix"
- Golden Dragon XML6103 "Snowfox"
- Golden Dragon XML6103 "Snow Leopard"
- Golden Dragon XML6127J "Marcopolo II"
- Golden Dragon XML6129J18 "Navigator"
- Zhongtong LCK6118H "Elegance"
- Zhongtong LCK6128H "Magnate"
- Golden Dragon XML6122J18 "Triumph"
- Golden Dragon XML6122J23"Triumph"
- Golden Dragon XML6122J15 "Triumph II"

Former:

- Golden Dragon XML6129 "Grand Cruiser"
- Hyundai Universe Space Luxury
- Higer KLQ6109 Koyo Motor
- Man AMC Tourist Star R39 18.350
- Yutong ZK6107HA
- Hino RM2PSS DMMW DM 10
- Hino RM2PSS DMMW DM 11
- Hino RM2PSS DMMW DM 12
- Hino RM2PSS DMMW DM 14
- Hino RM2PSS DMMW DM 16
- Nissan Diesel Euro Trans JA430SAN

Upcoming:

● Golden Dragon XML6122JREEV "GC12" (GC Series)

== Branding ==
=== Livery ===
The company's official logo is Road Runner which is displayed, either standing or running, on most buses, with the name 'PARTAS' written in capital letters. All buses vary in livery design, but are predominantly blue (light and dark), red and white.

=== Fleet numbering ===
The buses are numbered with 4 or 5 digits, with the number 8 being placed on the first and last digit (e.g. 8**8 and 8***8).

== Fare classes ==
Partas has employed various fare classes, which are sequenced below from the least to the most priced.

- Luxury: 2x1 lazyboy seating with charging ports each seat, individual buspad and onboard restroom. (28 seater)
- Deluxe: 2x2 seating with charging ports each seat and onboard restroom. (45 seater)
- Regular air–conditioned: 2x2 seating. (49 seater)

They also operate express buses mainly some 𝗟𝘂𝘅𝘂𝗿𝘆, with only one stopover.

== Destinations ==
=== Metro Manila ===
- Cubao, Quezon City
- Pasay
- Sampaloc, Manila

=== Provincial destinations ===
- Mabalacat, Pampanga (Dau Mabalacat Bus Terminal)
- San Fernando, La Union*
- Candon, Ilocos Sur*
- Vigan, Ilocos Sur*
- Narvacan, Ilocos Sur*
- Bangued, Abra*
- Santa Cruz, Ilocos Sur
- Laoag, Ilocos Norte*
- Baguio
- Sison, Pangasinan*
- Bolinao, Pangasinan
- Alaminos, Pangasinan
- Tuguegarao, Cagayan*
- Cauayan, Isabela*
- Ilagan, Isabela*
- Santiago, Isabela*
- Turbina, Calamba, Laguna
- Batangas City
- Sablayan, Occidental Mindoro
- San Jose, Occidental Mindoro

(*) All buses from Metro Manila will pass through TPLEX depending on the exit.

=== Inter-provincial ===
- Baguio - Laoag
- Baguio - Vigan
- Baguio - Narvacan
- Baguio - Bangued (placards and LEDs are shown as Abra)
- Baguio - San Fernando (LEDs and placards are shown as La Union)
- Baguio - Bolinao (via Agoo)
- Vigan - Sta. Cruz
- Tuguegarao - Santiago (via Ilagan)

== Former destinations ==
- Aparri, Cagayan
- Santa Teresita, Cagayan
- Luna, Apayao
- San Fernando, Pampanga
- Cabanatuan, Nueva Ecija
- Olongapo, Zambales
- Naga, Camarines Sur
- Tarlac City, Tarlac
