= Candon Church =

Roman Catholic church in Ilocos Sur, Philippines

- Saint John of Sahagun Parish Church
- Parokya ni San Juan de Sahagun (Filipino)
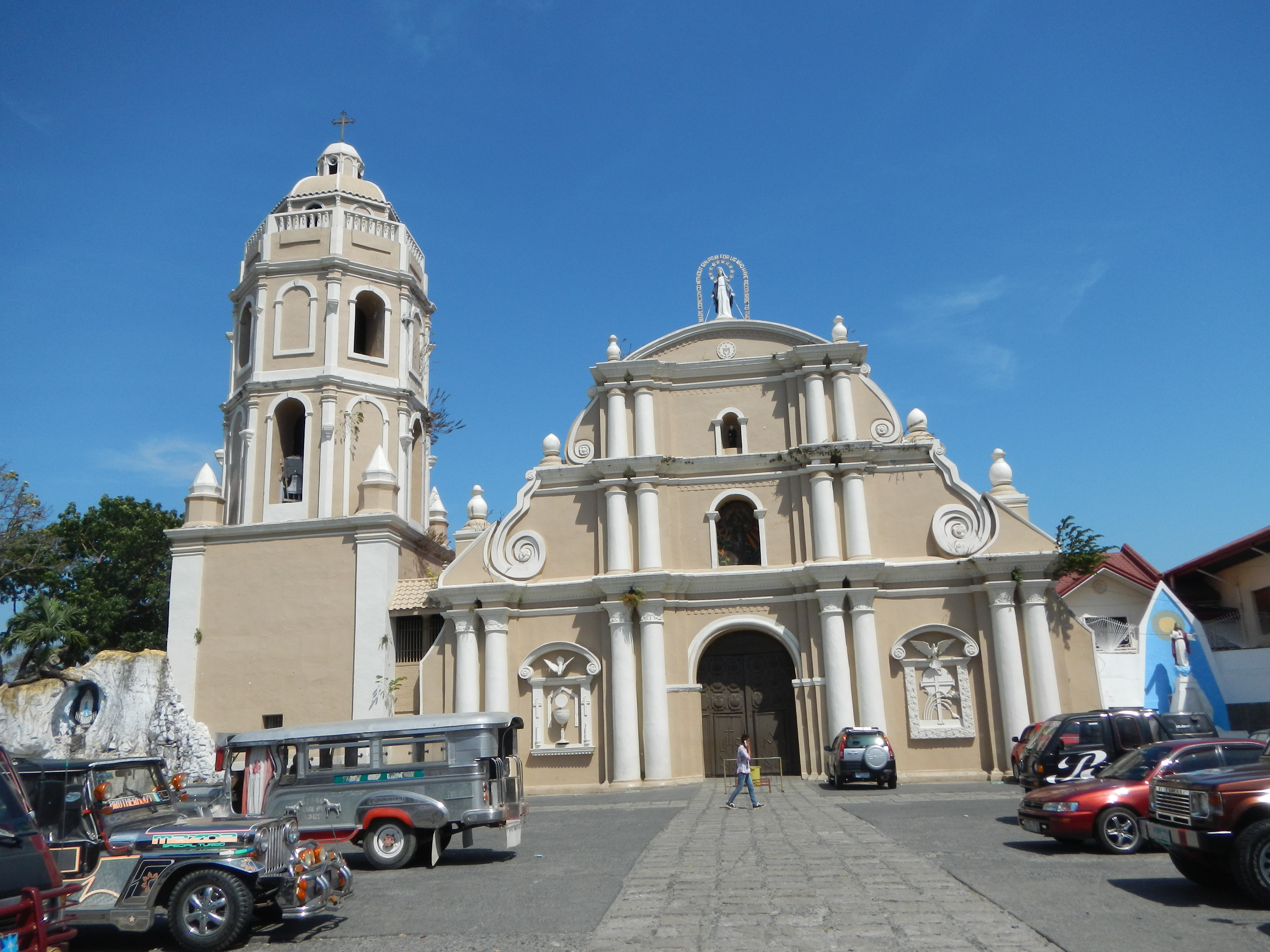
- Church facade in 2014

- Location in Luzon Location in the Philippines
- 17°11′36″N 120°26′57″E
- Location: Candon, Ilocos Sur
- Country: Philippines
- Denomination: Roman Catholic

History
- Status: Parish church
- Founded: 1591
- Founder: Augustinians
- Dedication: Saint John of Sahagun

Architecture
- Functional status: Active
- Architectural type: Church building
- Style: Earthquake Baroque

Administration
- Province: Ecclesiastical Province of Nueva Segovia
- Archdiocese: Nueva Segovia

Clergy
- Archbishop: Marlo Mendoza Peralta

Saint John of Sahagun Parish Church, commonly known as Candon Church, is a Roman Catholic church in the city of Candon, Ilocos Sur, Philippines. It is under the jurisdiction of the Archdiocese of Nueva Segovia. Constructed with an Earthquake Baroque design, the church's four-storey octagonal bell tower has an alternating open and blind apertures, a balustrade and is topped by a campanile (bell tower).

== History ==
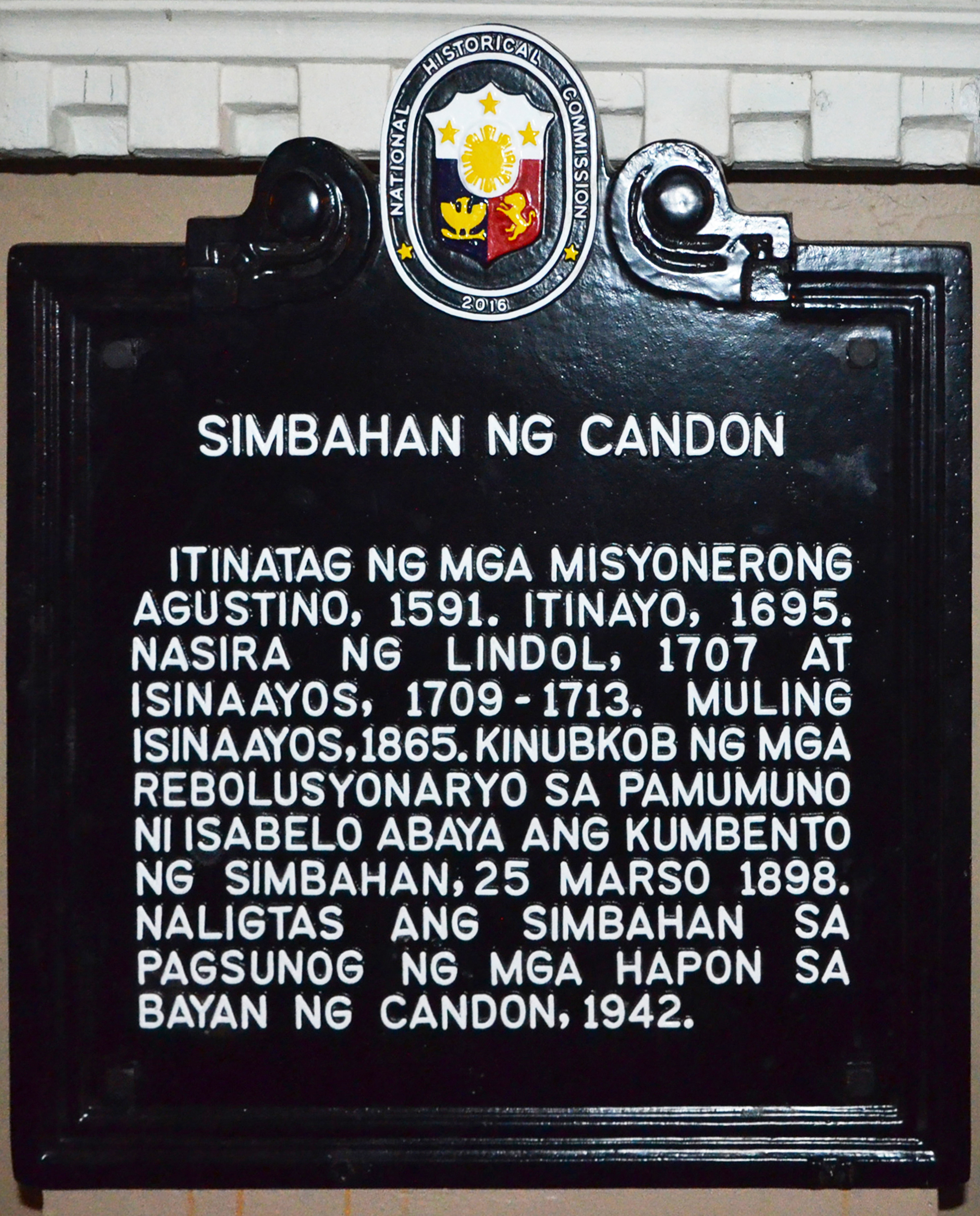
National historical marker unveiled in 2016

In 1591, the Augustinians accepted Candon as a house while Father Pedro Bravo, OSA initiated building one of the early churches in 1695. It was severely damaged in the 1707 earthquake that struck the country, but was rebuilt under the supervision of Father Jose Carbonel, OSA until 1710, and Father Diego del Castillo, OSA until 1713.

== Features ==
One of the highlights of this church are the two painting on canvas almost 150 feet (46 m) long, representing the 20 Mysteries of the Holy Rosary. It is said to be the longest religious painting in the Philippines. Father Vincente Avila, his cousin Mel Andino (an arts teacher), and Andino's student Redentor Castillo initiated the painting project; the painting was unveiled in December 2007.

Bell tower

Lourdes grotto

Façade details

Church door

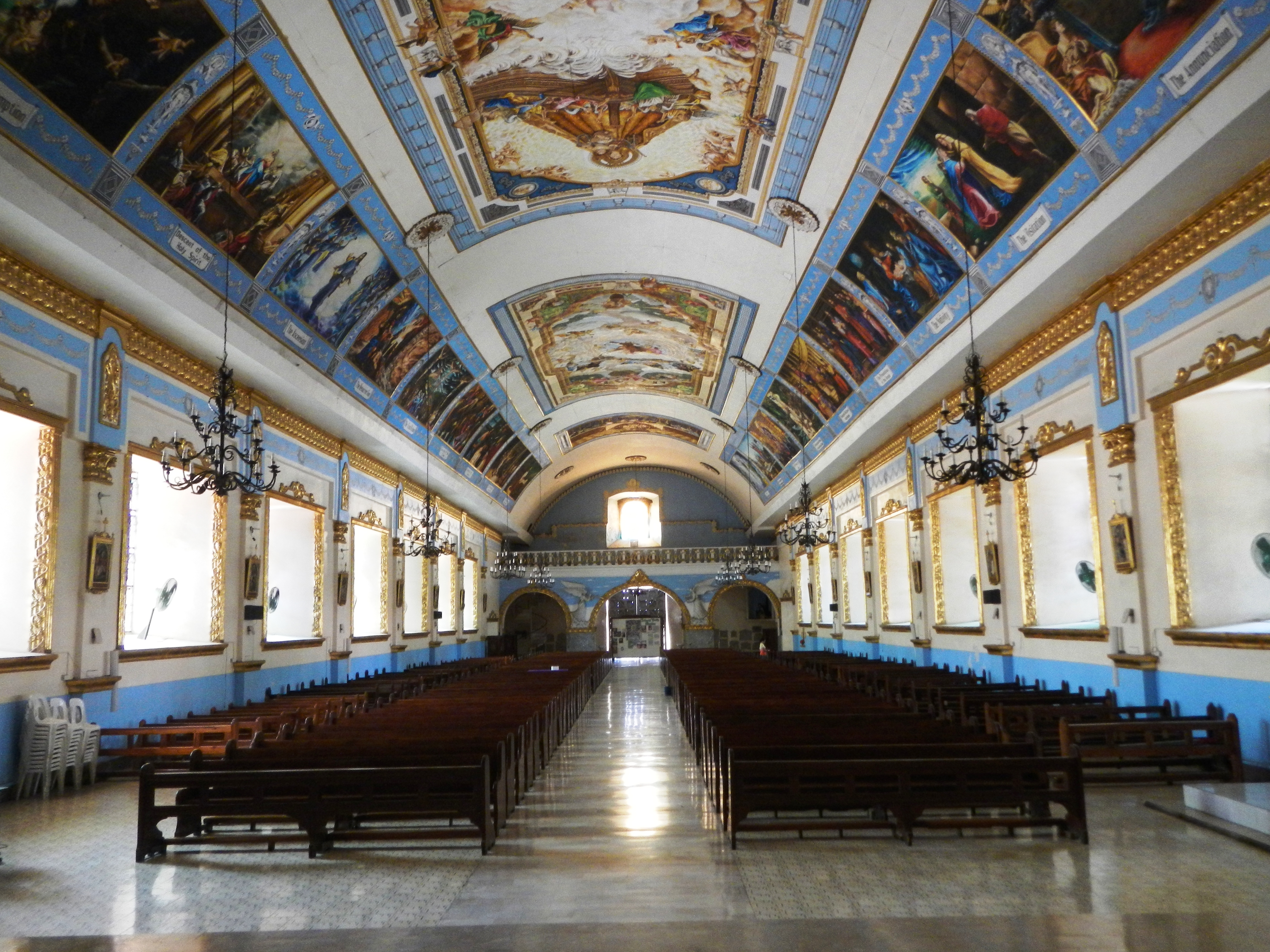
Church nave from the sanctuary showing the ceiling paintings

Ceiling painting detail

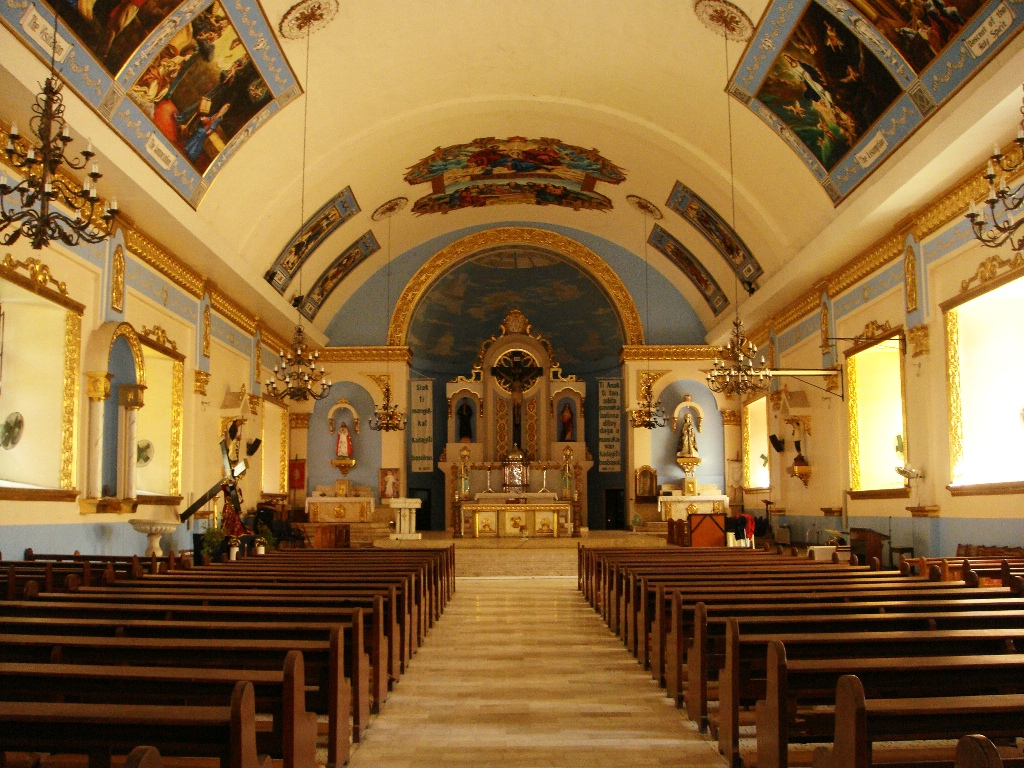
Nave and altar
