= Dominion Bus Lines =

Bus company in the Philippines

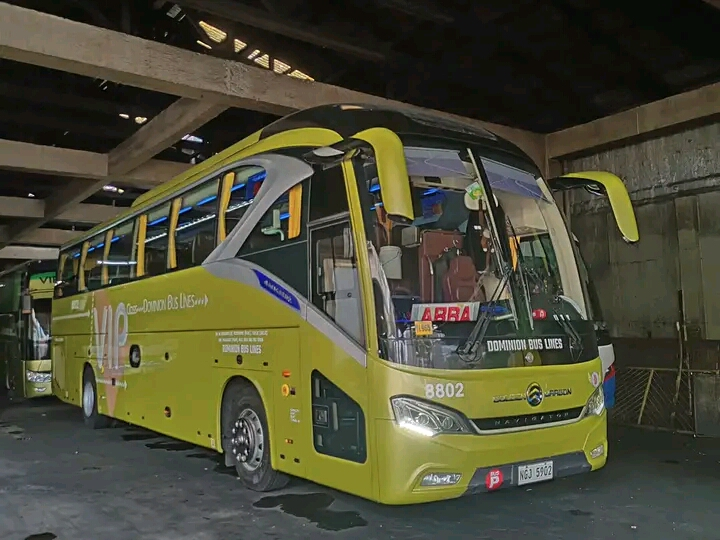
- A Dominion Bus preparing for trip to Bangued, Abra
- Founded: 1990; 36 years ago (Former Times Transit, 1961)
- Headquarters: 832 Aurora Blvd, Cubao, Quezon City, Philippines
- Service area: Northern Luzon (Ilocos Region)
- Service type: Provincial Operation
- Fleet: 120+ Buses (Times Transit)
- Operator: Mencorp Transport System (MENCORP), Inc.(Owned by Melisa Lim)

Dominion Bus Lines is a bus transportation company in the Philippines. It operates a 24/7 service for passengers and freight (known as "waybill") between Metro Manila and northwest Luzon (the Ilocos corridor).

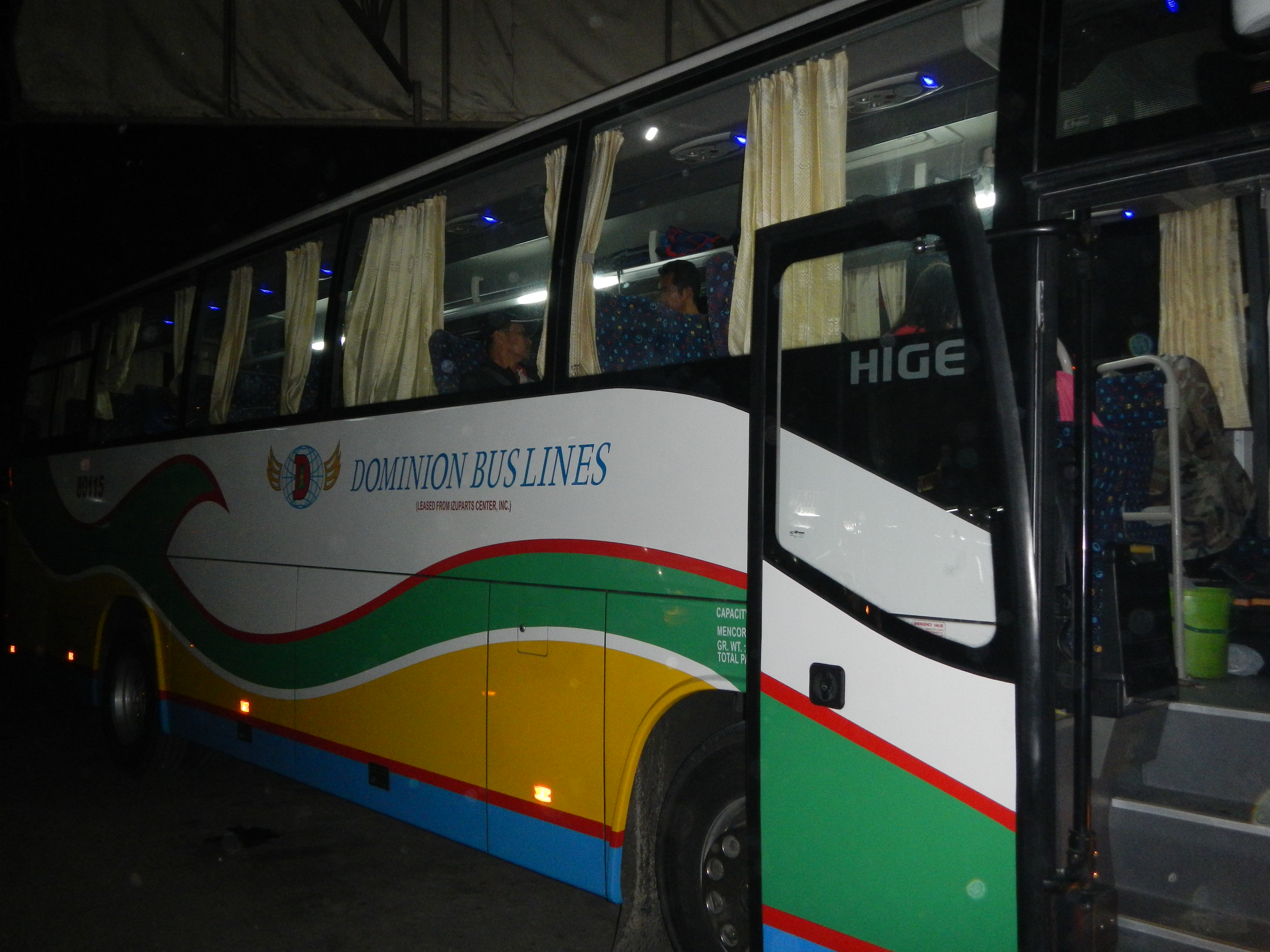
Dominion Bus Lines, Inc. at Dau Mabalacat, Pampanga Terminal

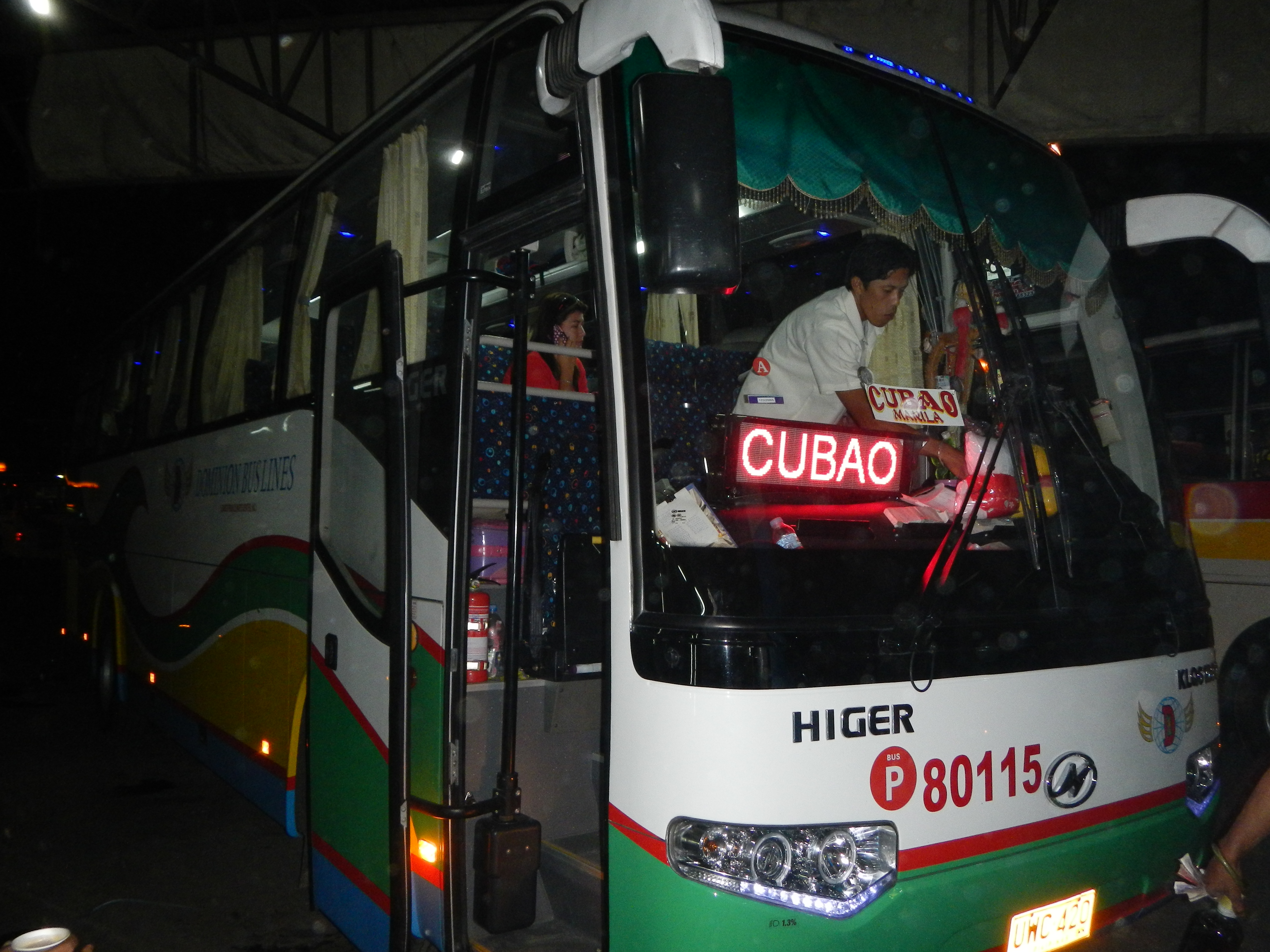
Dominion Bus, night portrait

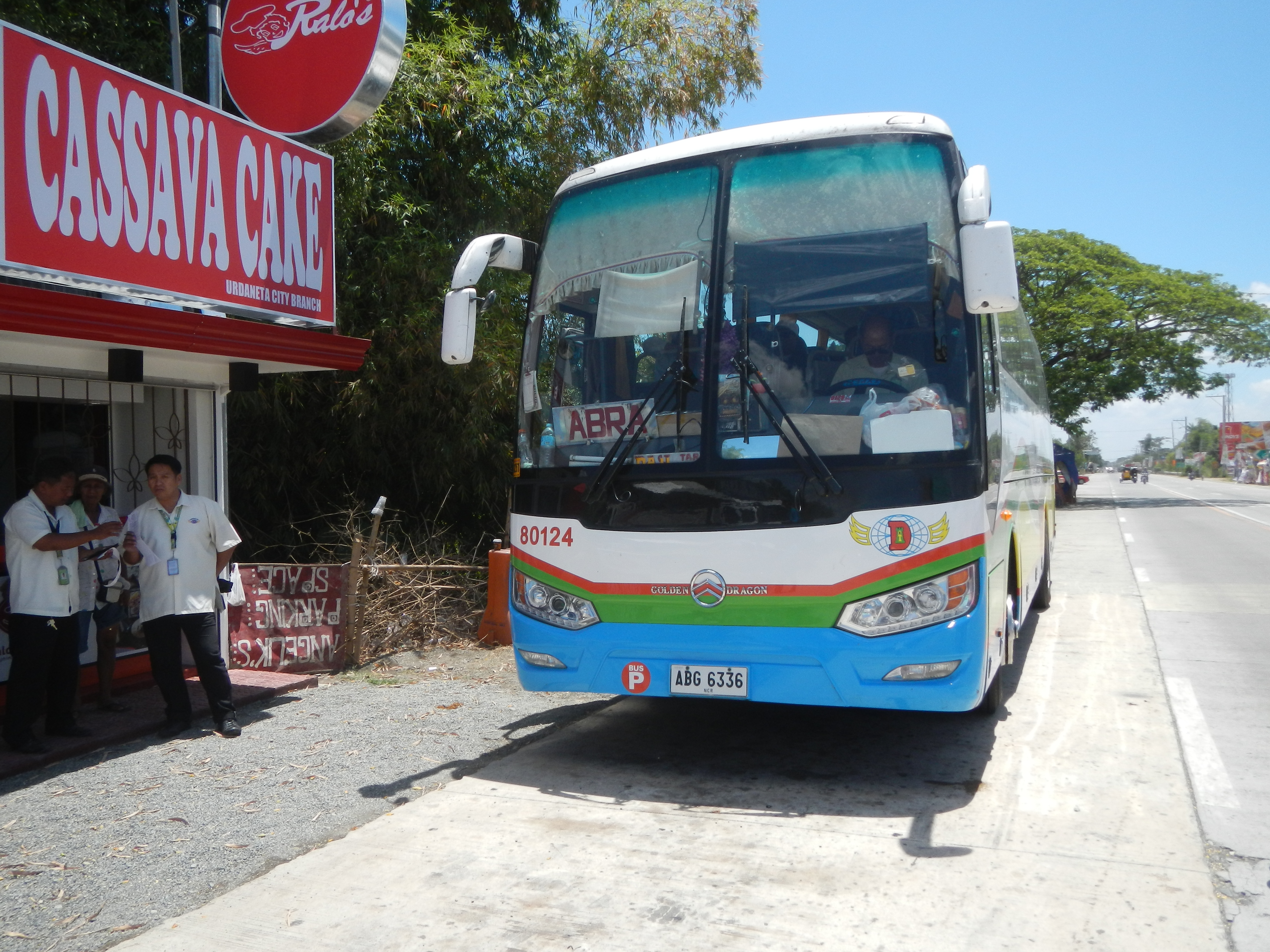
Dominion Bus Lines 80124 Golden Dragon Xml6103 "Marcopolo"

== History ==
The company was founded from its precursor, Times Transit Transportation Co., by Santiago Rondaris who inherited the earlier company from his parents Timoteo and Estelita Rondaris (hence, the name "TIMES"). Times was founded in the 1960s. The Rondarises also once operated the Shooting Star Freight Service alongside Times to answer the freight-moving needs of Ilocos Sur.

Times Transit mostly operated International Harvester Loadstar and some S-Series buses (and two Loadstar wreckers) with white, green and red livery with an illuminated logo on the roof, a few buses with a green and white paint scheme, with Superior Coach bodies built under license by Manila Motor Works. It was also known for its then-unique express buses, based on an International-Harvester bus platform and with Superior Coach bodies built under license by Manila Motor Works. They later supplanted their fleet with new air-conditioned buses, including some Hino buses with the then-new "Grandtheater" configuration—making them one of four bus companies operating in the North to field them (St. Joseph, Dagupan Bus, and Victory Liner being the other three), retaining the livery of the buses they supplanted. It had terminals along its route, from Laoag City in Ilocos Norte to Manila, and to Bangued, Abra and Baguio; its terminal at the southern end of Quezon Avenue in its northern headquarters in Vigan is particularly well known for its unique style and its flashy sign, which was the first and, because of its unique design, only of its kind in the city.

A labor dispute between management and its employees union finally brought the company down in the 1990s. About a year later, MENCORP bought some of the company's assets (including its new air-conditioned Hino, Mitsubishi Fuso and Mercedes-Benz buses—including their Hino "Grandtheater" buses) and formed Dominion Bus Lines. As a result, its route to Baguio was terminated, while all other routes by Times Transit were maintained. Its main terminal in Vigan is already half the size of its original dimensions, as part of the terminal is now leased to business establishments like a gasoline station and a private school; and, starting May 20, 2013, to Viron Transit. Viron also currently occupies Times' former garage located behind Mira Hills in Vigan, a few steps away from the sub-office of a power utility cooperative.

Times' terminal, refueling stop, employees dormitory, and mini-garage in Bantay, Ilocos Sur, which is along the National Highway, formerly housed one of the most modern garages in the province. It now ceased operations, and is currently occupied by food establishments (after its gasoline station, also owned by Rondaris, ceased operations ten or so years after the company shut down). The refueling stop, garage entrance, and employees' dormitory were later demolished to make way for a pizza restaurant, with part of the gasoline station's service bays still standing. The site is located across the street from where GMW Transit formerly parked its buses in Vigan City before eventually opening their own garage in Bantay.

Also in Bantay is another of Times' garages, located just beside the Quirino Stadium. It is still standing today (along with some quarters for drivers), rather well-preserved, as it is currently occupied by a soft drink distributor.

== Fleet ==
=== Golden Dragon Units ===
- Golden Dragon XML6102 "Splendour"
- Golden Dragon XML6103 "Marcopolo"
- Golden Dragon XML6122J23 "Triumph"
- Golden Dragon XML6103 "Snow Leopard"
- Golden Dragon XML6129J18C "Navigator"

=== Daewoo Units ===
- Daewoo SR BV115

=== Yutong Units ===
- Yutong ZK6122 HD9
- ZK6105H

=== Higer units ===
- Higer KLQ6119QE3 V91
- Higer KLQ6109E3 V90

== Branding (Classes) ==
- Standard Airconditioned
- VIP Class

-Deluxe -Super Deluxe -Pathfinder

The companies number branding are numbered with the number 80 being placed on the first( e.g. 80***) And The Pathfinder VIP Class are numbered with 88 being placed on the first (e.g. 88**)

== See also ==
- List of bus companies of the Philippines
- Viron Transit
- Partas
