= Viron Transit =

Bus company in the Philippines

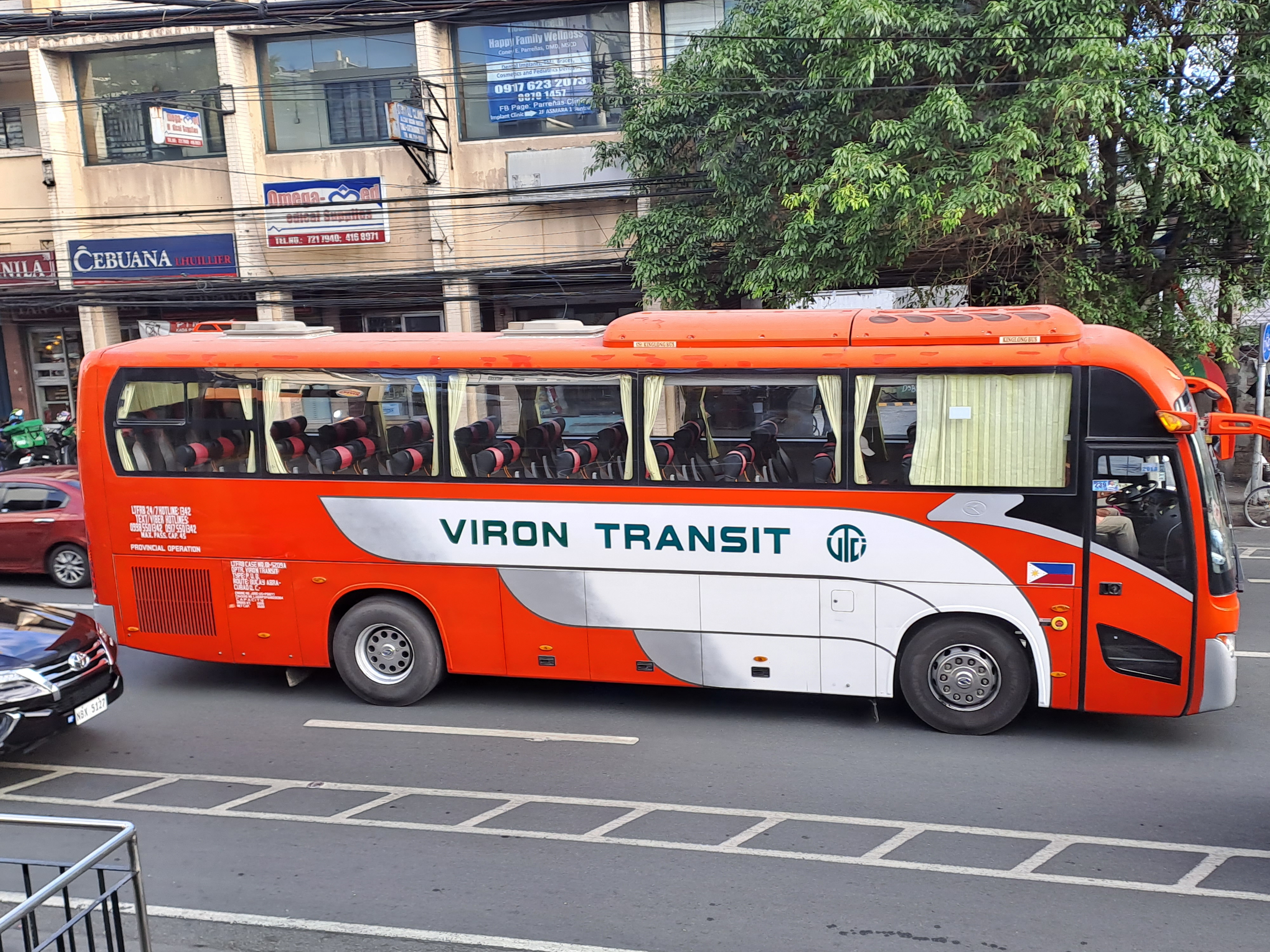
- A Viron Transit bus
- Founded: April 8, 1978; 48 years ago
- Headquarters: 1209 Blumentritt Cor. Dapitan St., Sampaloc 1000 Manila
- Service area: Metro Manila - Ilocos Sur, Philippines
- Service type: Provincial Operation
- Fleet: 120+ vehicles (Hino, Mitsubishi Fuso, Mercedes-Benz), King Long, International Harvester, Mitsubishi Fuso (Times Transit)
- Operator: Viron Transportation Co., Inc.

Viron Transportation Company or Viron Transit is a bus company servicing the Ilocos Region, Philippines. The bus company is owned by millionaire Santiago Rondaris' daughter. It formerly operated as far as the second district of Ilocos Sur but has started to operate as far as Laoag City after the collapse of its related bus company Times Transit.

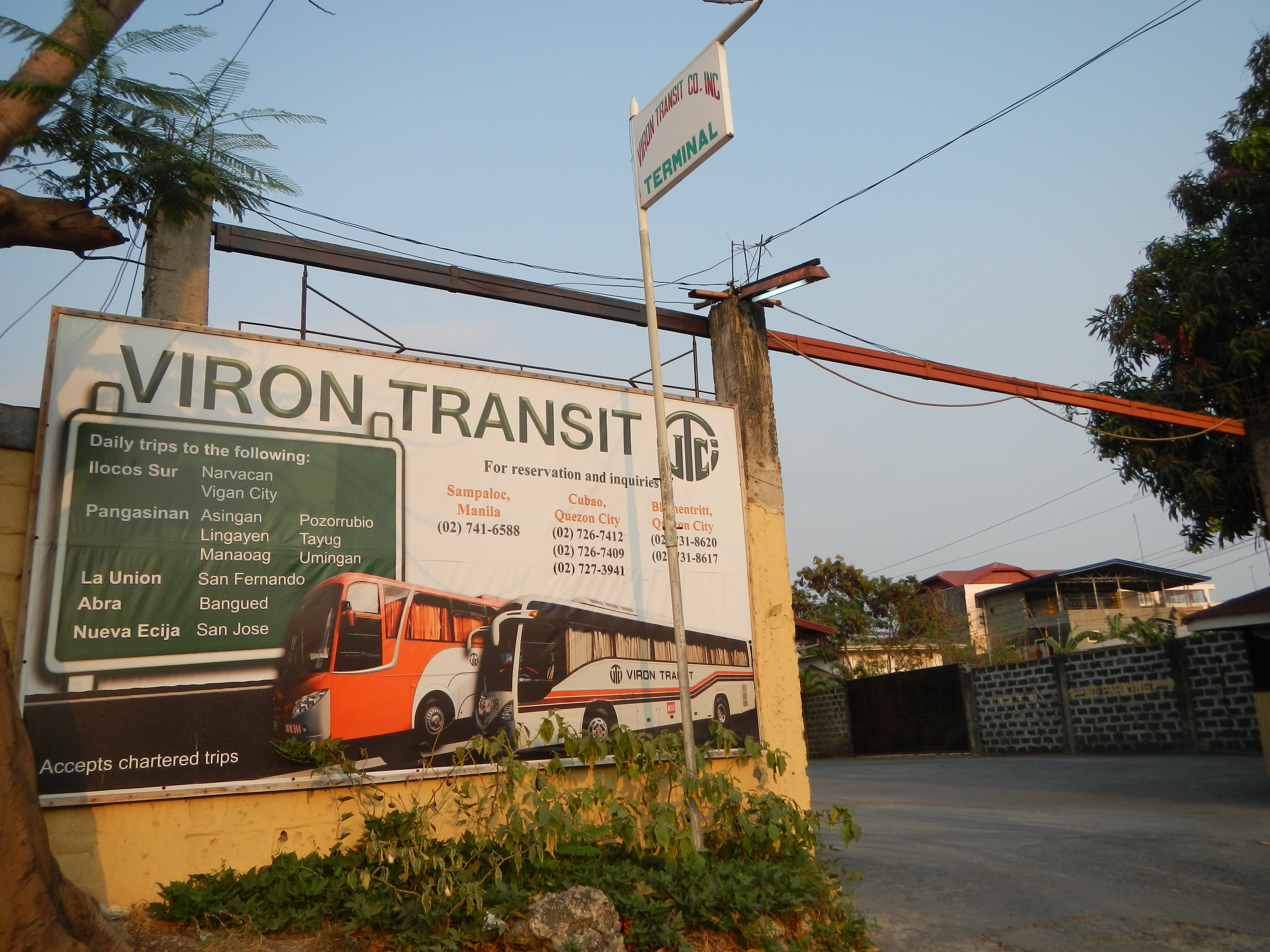
Facade, San Fernando, La Union terminal

== History ==
Viron Transportation Co., Inc. ("Viron" originates from "VIRgilio RONdaris") is related to the former Times Transit (because it is owned by their father Santiago Rondaris). It once used Superior Coach-bodied International Harvester Loadstar and early S-Series—essentially the same specs as those of Times Transit but with different livery: cream with green and red stripes and green-colored fonts; plus rims painted red with green borders plus illuminated logo on the roof. They also operated Hino buses with "Bustler" bodies built under license from UK coachbuilders Plaxton by Manila Motor Works. Nowadays it is using and mostly relying on its newer rebodied Mitsubishi Fuso, Hino RF, Mercedes-Benz and King Long buses. Their Loadstar and S-Series coaches were stored at Pozorrubio, Pangasinan, in front of Dominion Bus Line's Terminal (owned by his sister Virginia Rondaris-Mendoza); and were recently sold to a collector for about PhP60,000 per bus.

Once only limited to the second district of Ilocos Sur. It has expanded to the first district of the province and beyond; and has occupied the former Times Transit compound in Vigan (near the ISECO Vigan Sub-Office, behind Mira Hills) after Times' collapse, and serves as its terminal there. It has also stop-over terminals/garages in San Fernando, La Union and Narvacan, Ilocos Sur. Starting May 20, 2013, Viron Transit will be using the front of the terminal formerly used by Times located along Quezon Avenue in Vigan, with the existing Dominion Bus Lines terminal (which is a former garage for Times buses) located at the back.

== Fleet ==
Viron Transit is utilizing Mitsubishi Fuso, Hino Pilipinas, Mercedes-Benz, King Long buses, Viron Motor/Marilao Works (VMW) at present, totalling 120 units (including those from Dominion Bus Lines).

- PRESENT FLEETS
  - Hyundai
- Hyundai Universe Xpress Prime
  - Hino Pilipinas
- Hino Rk
- Hino Partex
  - King Long
- XMQ6110Y
- XMQ6118CB
- XMQ6802Y2 (Used for Charter /Tourist)
- XMQ6111CY
- XMQ6117Y3
- XMQ6101Y (1 Super Deluxe Regular Fare)
  - Viron Motors/Marilao Works (VMW)
- FORMER FLEETS
  - Mitsubishi Fuso
  - Mercedes-Benz

== Destinations ==
- Metro Manila
  - Cubao, Quezon City
  - Sampaloc, Manila
  - Balingasa, Quezon City
- Provincial Destinations
  - Bangued, Abra
  - Candon, Ilocos Sur
  - Narvacan, Ilocos Sur
  - Santa, Ilocos Sur
  - Santa Maria, Ilocos Sur
  - Vigan City, Ilocos Sur
  - Laoag City, Ilocos Norte
  - San Fernando City, La Union
  - Pozorrubio, Pangasinan
  - Tayug, Pangasinan
  - San Nicolas, Pangasinan via Tayug
  - Bacnotan, La Union
  - San Juan, La Union
  - Asingan, Pangasinan
  - Umingan, Pangasinan
  - Santa Maria, Pangasinan
  - San Jose, Nueva Ecija

Note: All Buses from Metro Manila were pass through SCTEX Concepcion Exit starting last April 2017, and then in 2018, some of buses were pass through TPLEX Urdaneta or Pozorrubio Exit.

== Former Destinations ==
- Lingayen, Pangasinan
- Manaoag, Pangasinan
