= John of Sahagún =

Spanish Augustinian friar and priest

Saint John of Sahagún OESA
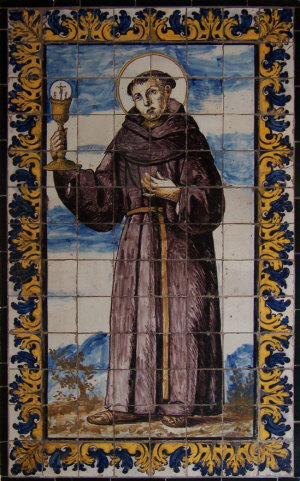

Confessor
- Born: c. 1430; Sahagún, Province of Leon, Crown of Castile
- Died: 11 June 1479 (aged 48); Salamanca, Province of Salamanca, Crown of Castile
- Venerated in: Roman Catholic Church
- Beatified: 1601, Rome by Pope Clement VIII
- Canonized: 16 October 1690, Rome by Pope Alexander VIII
- Major shrine: Old Cathedral, Salamanca, Spain
- Feast: 11 June
- Attributes: Chalice and host

John of Sahagún, OESA (Spanish: Juan de Sahagún), (c. 1430 – 11 June 1479) was a Spanish Augustinian friar and priest. He was a leading preacher of his day, and was known as a peacemaker and reconciler of enemies among the nobles and factions of Salamanca. He was declared a saint by the Catholic Church in 1690 by Pope Alexander VIII.

== Life ==
John was born in the year 1419, at Sahagún (or San Facondo) in the Province of Leon. He was the oldest of the seven children of Juan González del Castrillo and Sancha Martínez, a wealthy family of the city.

González received his early education from the monks of the Royal Monastery of St. Benedict in his native city, a leading religious and educational center in the region known as the Cluny of Spain. He received the tonsure while still a youth, according to the custom of the times, after which his father procured for him the benefice of the neighboring parish of Tornillo. He was later introduced to Alfonso de Cartagena, the Bishop of Burgos (1435–1456), who was impressed by the bright, high-spirited boy. Cartagena had him educated at his own residence, gave him several prebends, ordained him a priest in the year 1445, and made him a canon at the Cathedral of Burgos.

Possessing all of these offices simultaneously caused González many qualms of conscience, as it was contrary to Church law. He soon resigned all, retaining only that of the Chapel of St. Agatha in a poor neighborhood of the city, where he said Mass, and preached the faith to the poor. He then began to lead a life of strict poverty and mortification.

=== Preacher ===
When his bishop died in 1456, John resigned as chaplain to pursue further studies at the University of Salamanca, where for four years he applied himself to the study of theology and canon law, earning degrees in both. During this time he exercised the ministry at the chapel of the College of St. Bartholomew (in the Parish of St Sebastian), and held that position for nine years. As preacher, he drew large crowds; the Duke of Alba complained when John denounced not only the sins of common people, but also those of the nobility. He devoted himself to pastoral care. Owing to illness, he was obliged to undergo an operation for the removal of kidney stones. He vowed that if his life were spared, he would become a Religious.

=== Friar ===
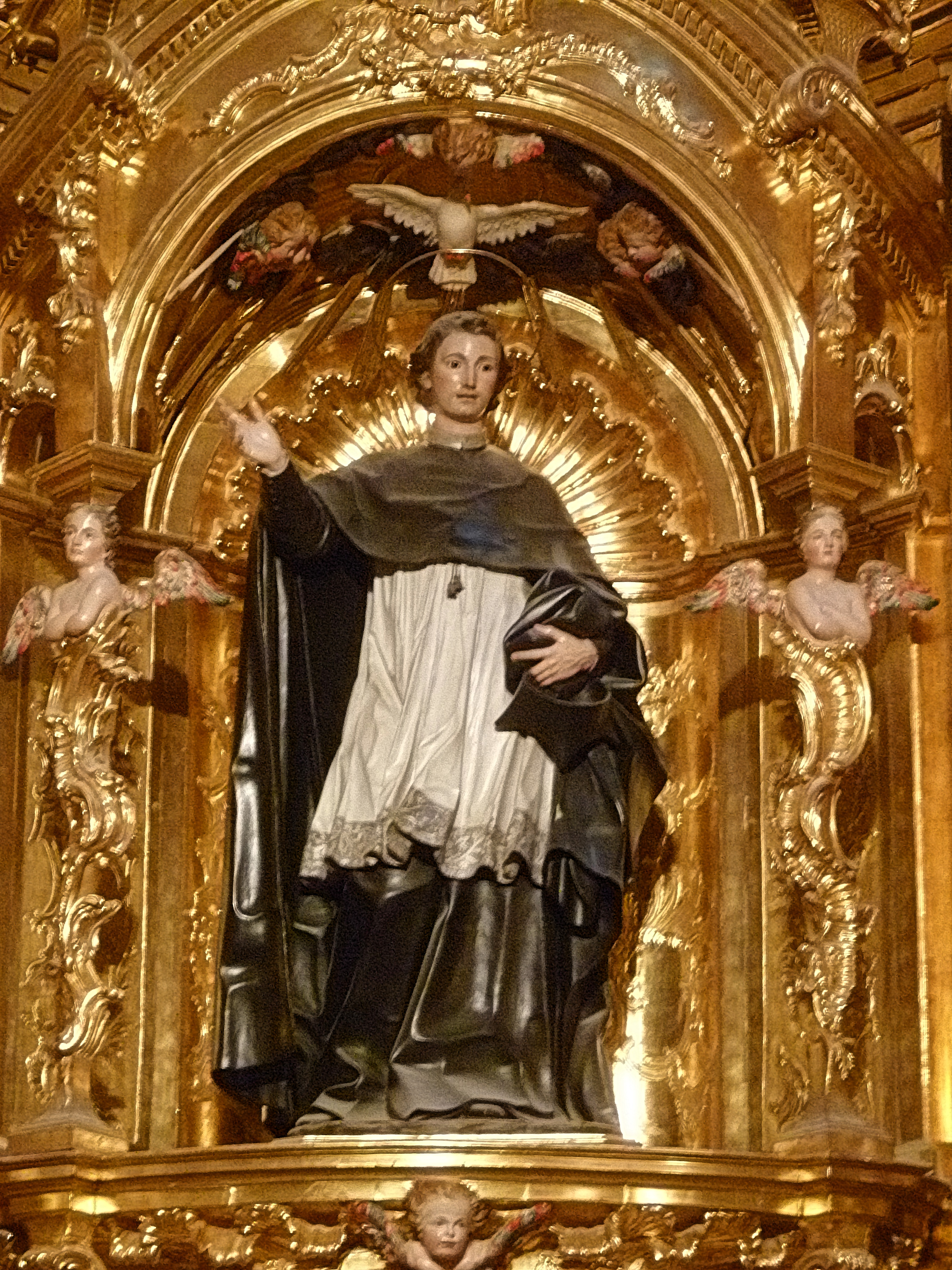
Chapel of St. John, Burgos Cathedral

Upon his recovery in the year 1463, González applied for admission to the Order of Hermits of St. Augustine, at the Monastery of St. Peter, from that point on, being known simply as Brother (or Friar) John. In the following year, on August 28, 1464, John made his profession of solemn vows as a member of the Order. By the command of his superiors, John gave himself wholeheartedly to preaching. In his sermons, John did not hesitate to publicly criticize the abuses of the powerful and the frequent public scandals of the upper classes. He soon made many enemies. Some women of Salamanca, embittered by the saint's strong sermon against extravagance in dress, openly insulted him in the streets and pelted him with stones until stopped by a patrol of guards.

John was appointed master of novices, and later in the year 1471, prior of the community. He conducted the Religious under his rule more by example than by his words. He also served as delegate to various provincial chapters.

John had a particular devotion to the Blessed Sacrament. He was gifted with the ability to read the secrets of conscience, so that it was not easy to deceive him. Because of his reputation, he was often approached to reconcile rival groups and restore peace to the city. He was also respected as a defender of the rights of workers and the common folk.

By mid-1479 John's health began to fail and it was rumored in the city that he had been poisoned by a woman in retaliation for his condemnation of the immoral lifestyle of a public figure. True or not, John died at the monastery on 11 June 1479. His remains were buried in the Old Cathedral, Salamanca.

== Veneration ==
Soon after John's death, his popularity spread throughout Spain. The process of beatification began in 1525 under Pope Clement VII, and in 1601 he was declared "Blessed" by Pope Clement VIII.

New miracles were said to have been wrought through his intercession, and on 16 October 1690 Pope Alexander VIII canonized him. In 1729 Pope Benedict XIII inscribed his liturgical feast day in the Roman Calendar for 12 June, since 11 June, the anniversary of his death was occupied by the feast of Saint Barnabas. In the 1969 revision of the Roman liturgical celebration was left to local calendars because of the limited importance attributed to him on a universal level. In the Roman Martyrology, the official list of saints of the Catholic Church, his feast day is 11 June.

John's life written by John of Seville at the end of the 15th century, with additions in 1605 and 1619, is the one used by the Bollandists in "Acta SS.", June, III, 112. Later biographies were written in the early 17th century by Agustín Antolínez, and Alfonso Osorio.

In art, John is represented holding a chalice and host surrounded by rays of light.

== See also ==
- Catholic Church in Spain
- Saint John of Sahagún, patron saint archive
