= Inocencio Aniceto Transportation =

Bus company in the Philippines

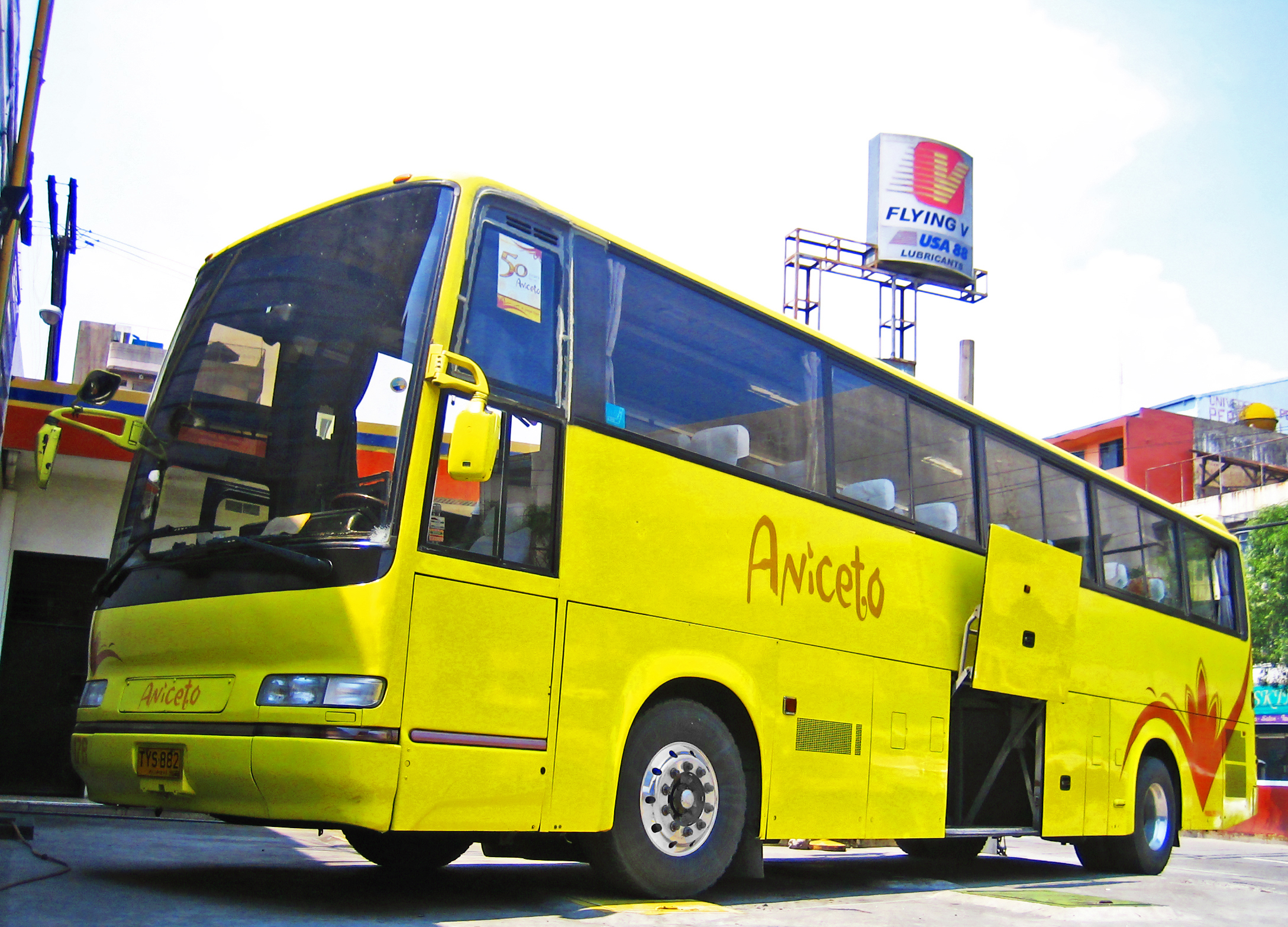
- Founded: 1961 (inactive since 2020)
- Headquarters: Vigan, Ilocos Sur
- Service area: Ilocos Region, Metro Manila
- Service type: Tour bus service, Bus rapid transit
- Fleet: 20 buses

Inocencio Aniceto Transportation, also known as St. Joseph Transportation, is a family-owned provincial bus company based in Vigan, Ilocos Sur, Philippines. Established in 1961 by Inocencio Aniceto, the company operates routes between Metro Manila and the Ilocos Region. Its fleet has included bus models from manufacturers such as Hino, Isuzu, Mitsubishi Fuso, Hyundai, and King Long.

== History ==
The company was founded in 1961 by Inocencio Aniceto, a native of Ilocos Sur.

In 1982, it became the first bus company in the Philippines to operate MAN Royal Commuter Service buses, distributed by Delta Motors Corporation.

During the 1990s, the company encountered financial difficulties and sold part of its fleet, including newly acquired Mercedes-Benz units, to Auto Bus Transportation. To continue operations, additional were sold, and management changes were implemented under the leadership of Dr. Rodolfo Aniceto and his wife. The company later acquired surplus buses from Japan, including units such as Isuzu Super Cruisers, Hino S'elega, Hino Blue Ribbons, and a Mitsubishi Fuso Aero Queen, and resumed several of its former routes.

In 2010, the company acquired Wheels of Fortune Transport, a tourist bus operator, and subsequently rebranded its charter division as "Aniceto Travel Services".

In October 2011, the company began operating the Baguio–Vigan route.

In 2017, it introduced new King Long buses to its fleet. However, the outbreak of the COVID-19 pandemic disrupted these efforts and since then, their business activities have been mostly inactive.

== Fleet ==
The company's fleet has included:

- Hino S'elega
- Hino Blue Ribbon
- Isuzu Super Cruiser
- Fuso Aero Bus
- Hyundai Aero
- King Long

== Routes ==
- Manila – Vigan, Ilocos Sur
- Baguio – Santa, Ilocos Sur
