= Ilocos Region =

Administrative region of the Philippines

Ilocos Deppaar ti Ilocos Sagor na Baybay na Luzon
- Region
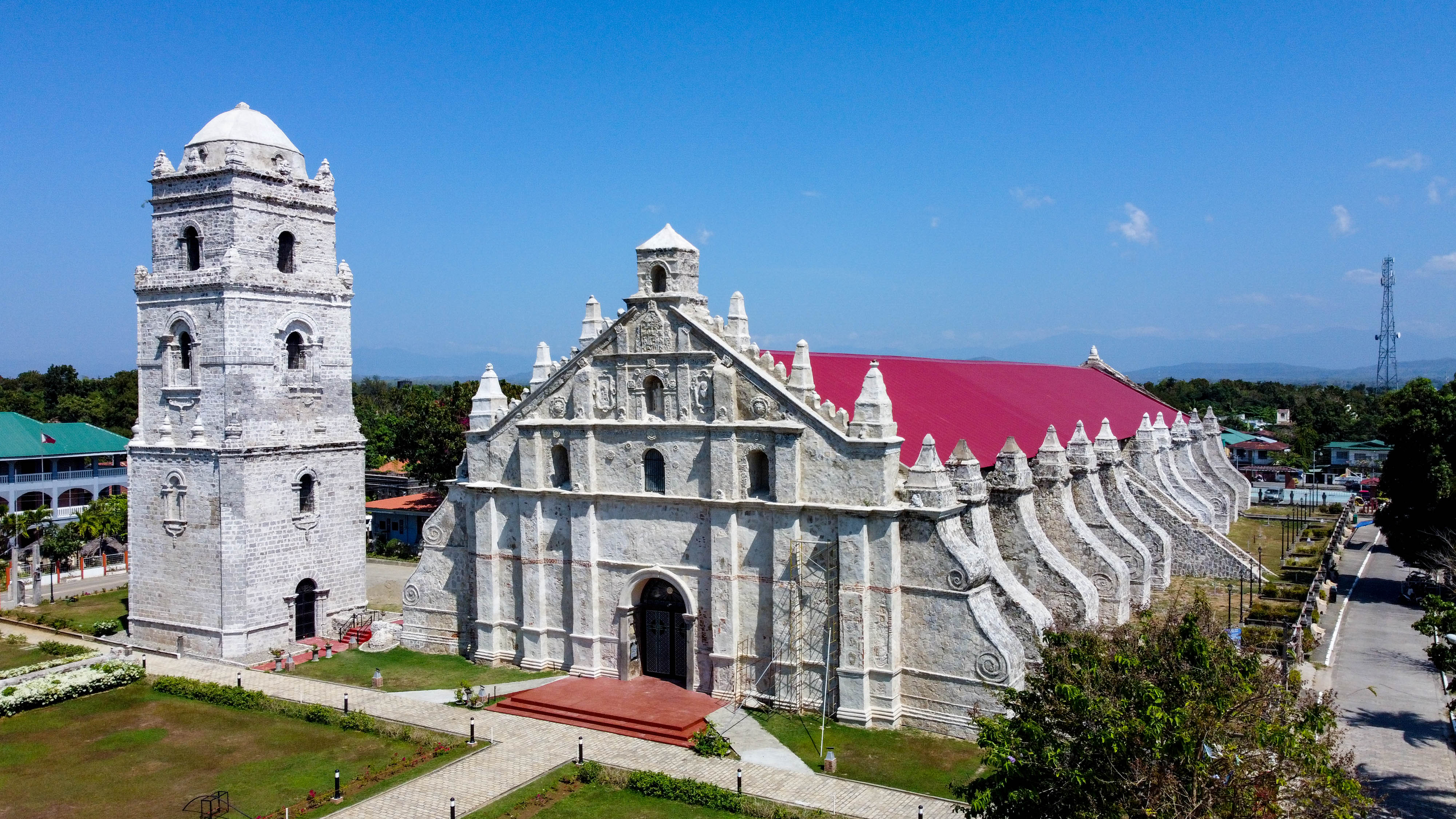
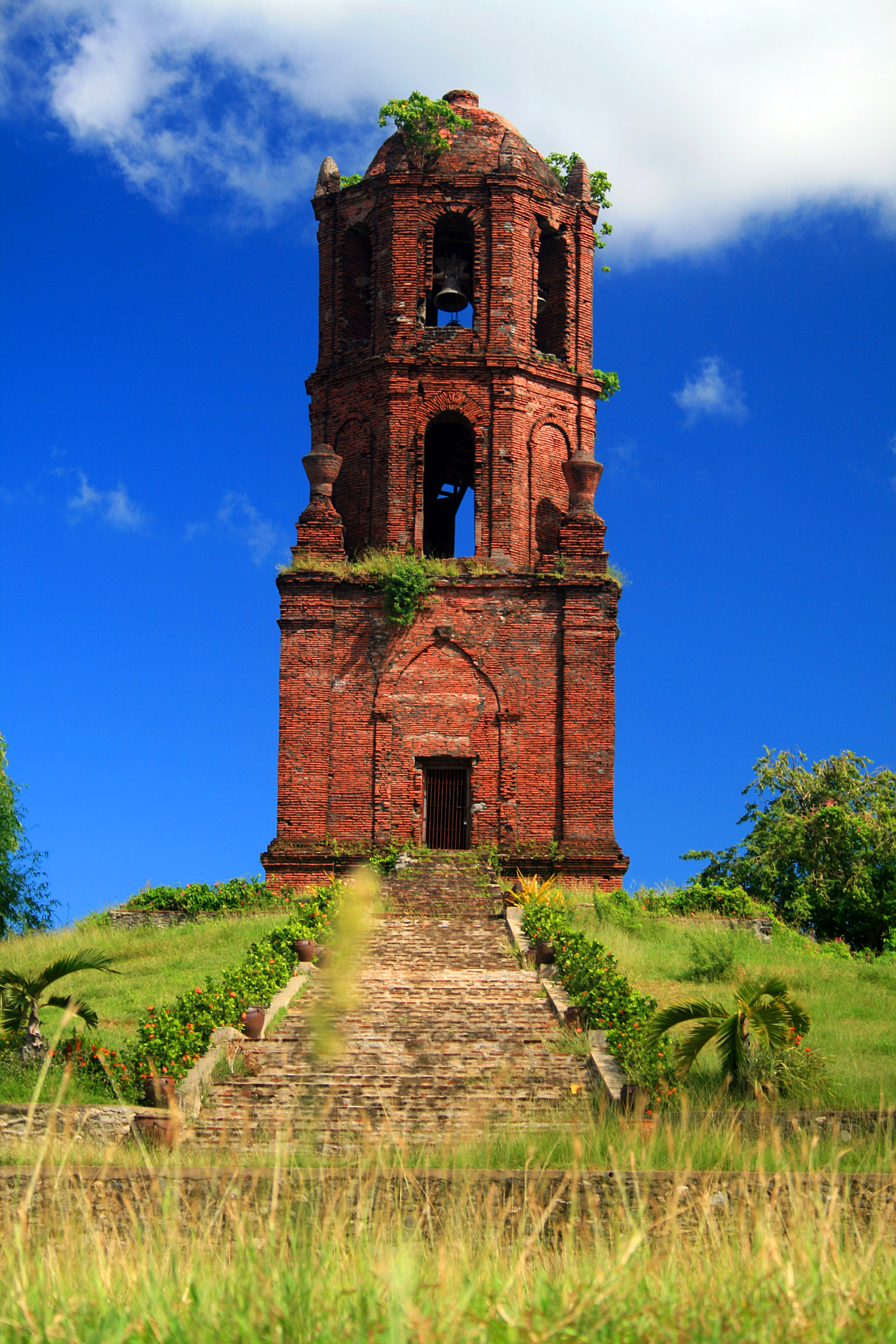
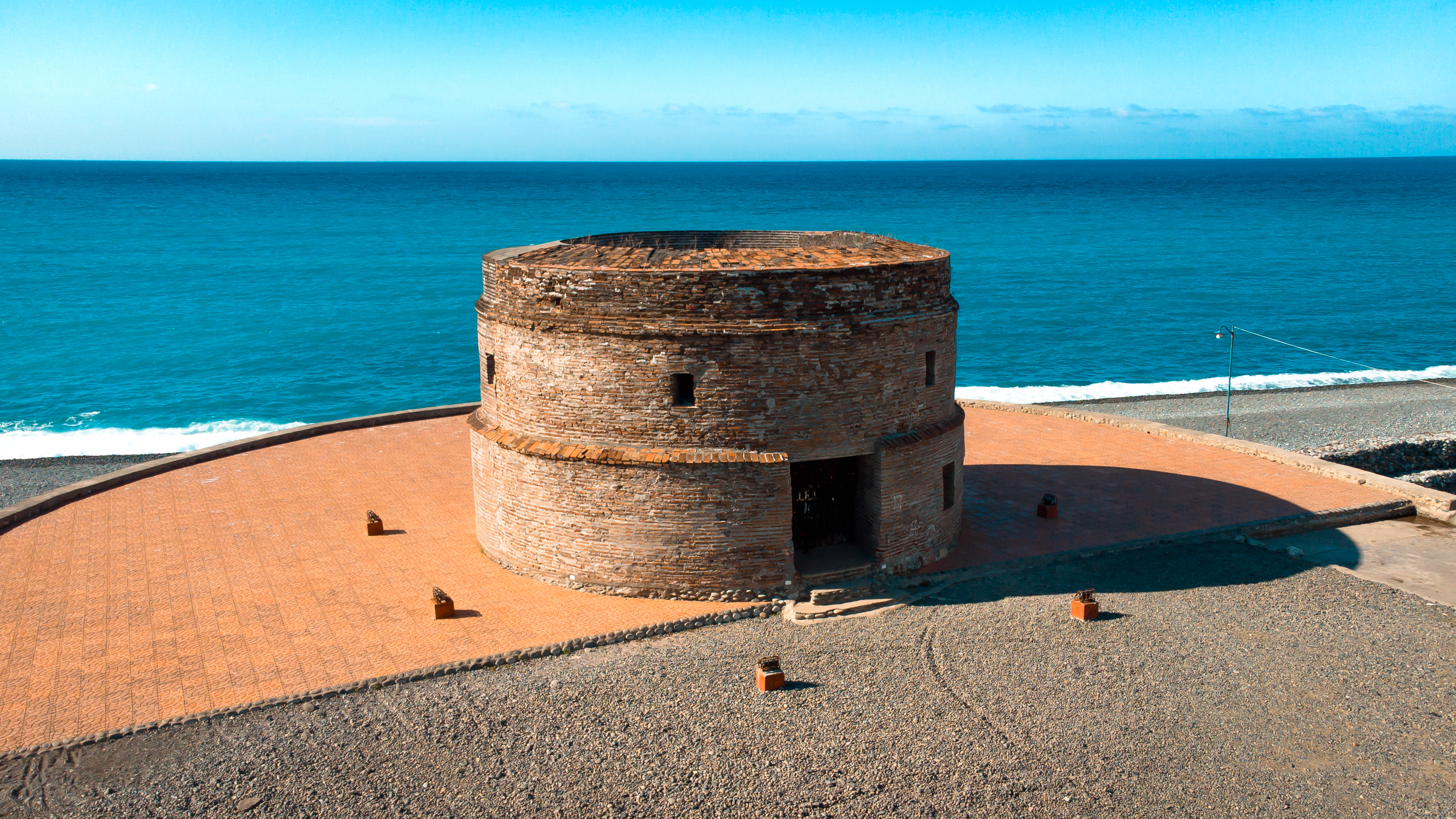
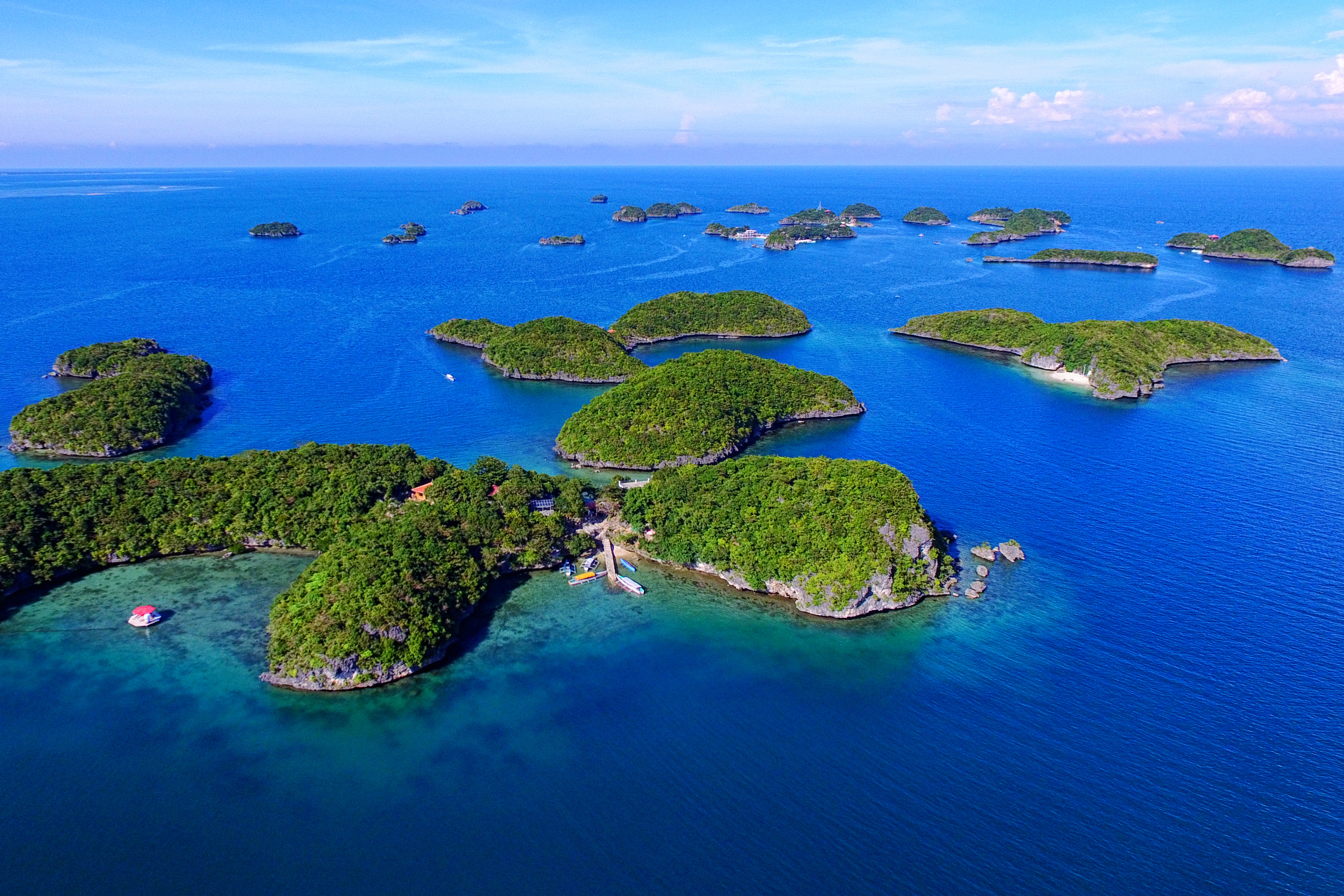
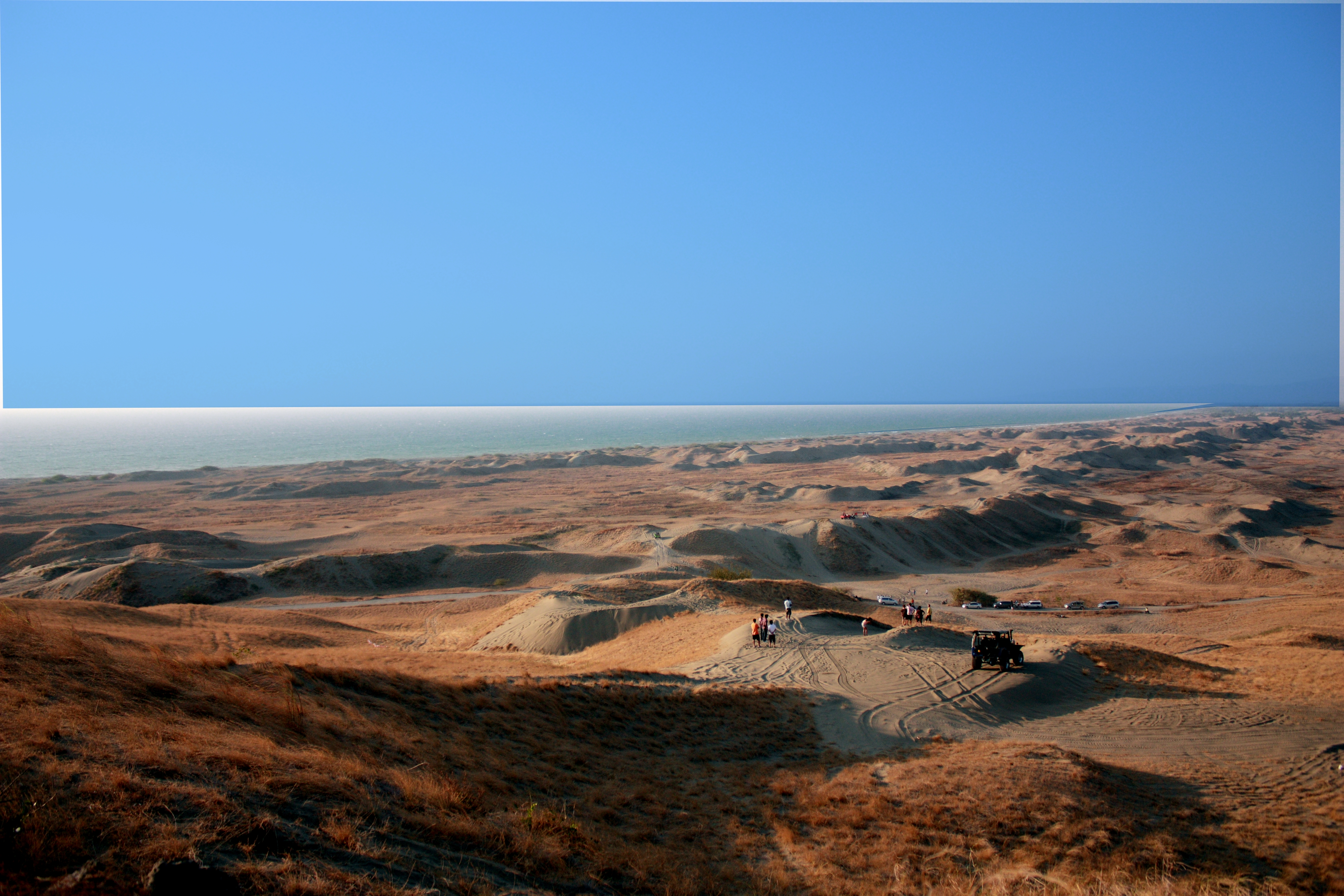
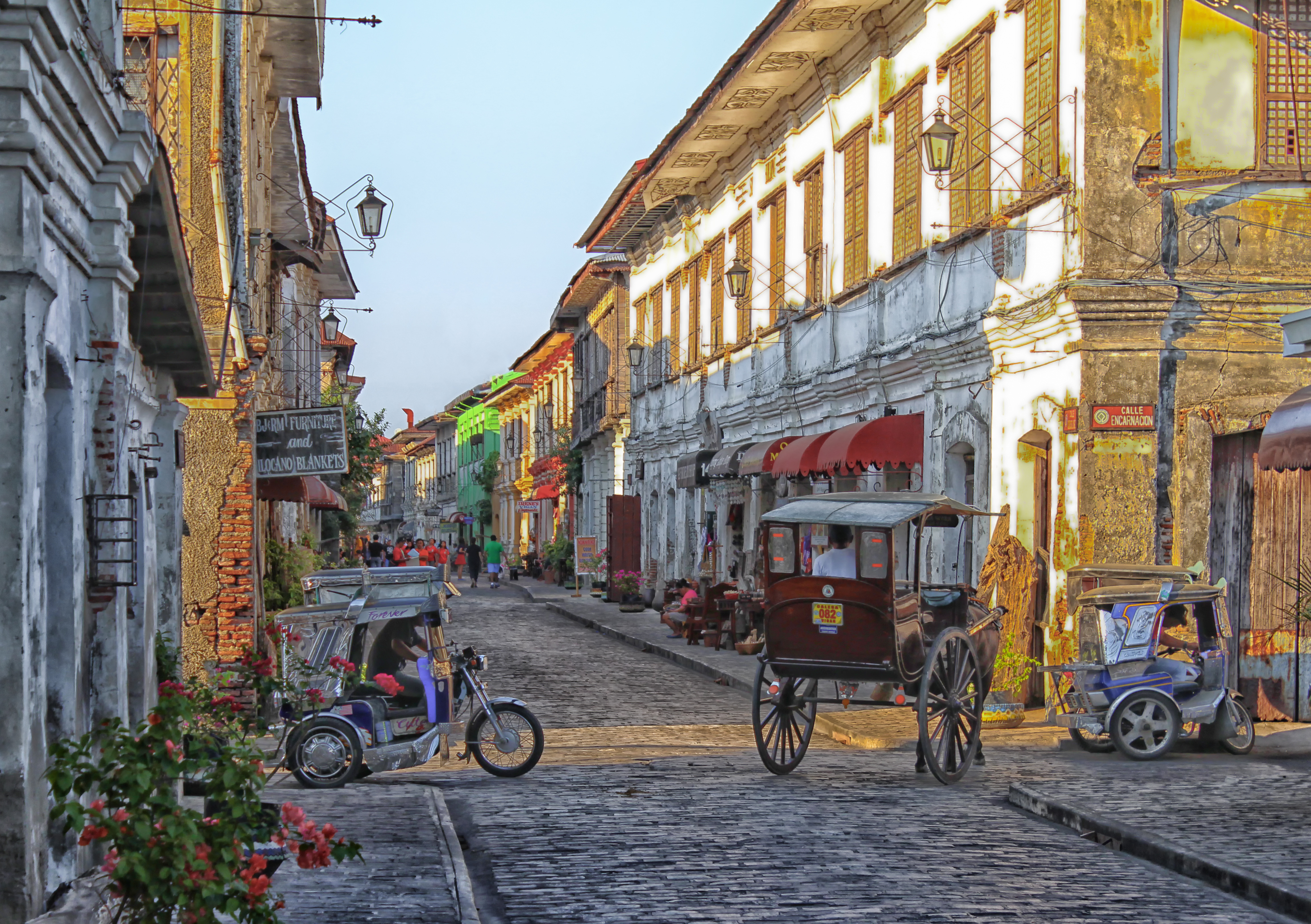
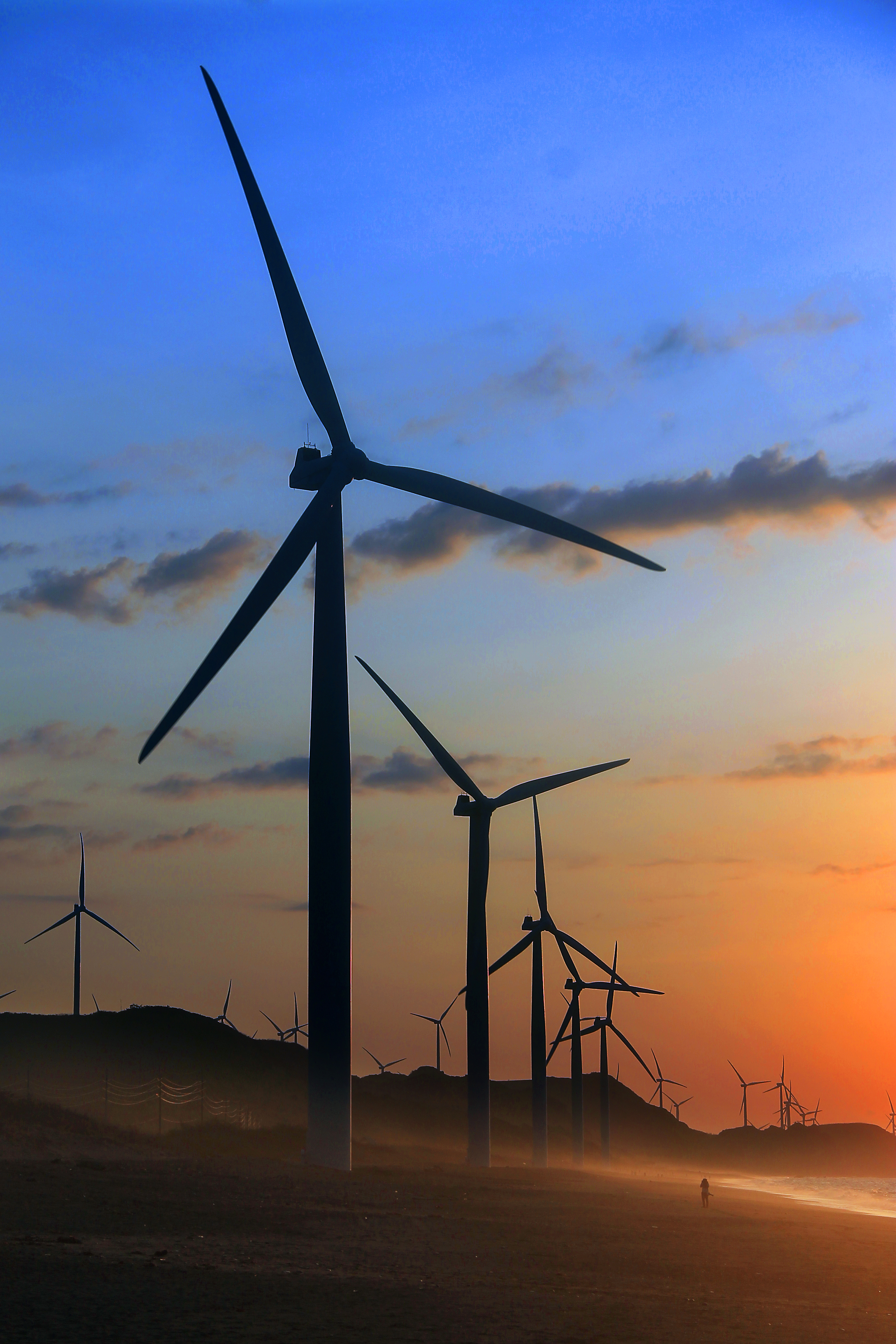
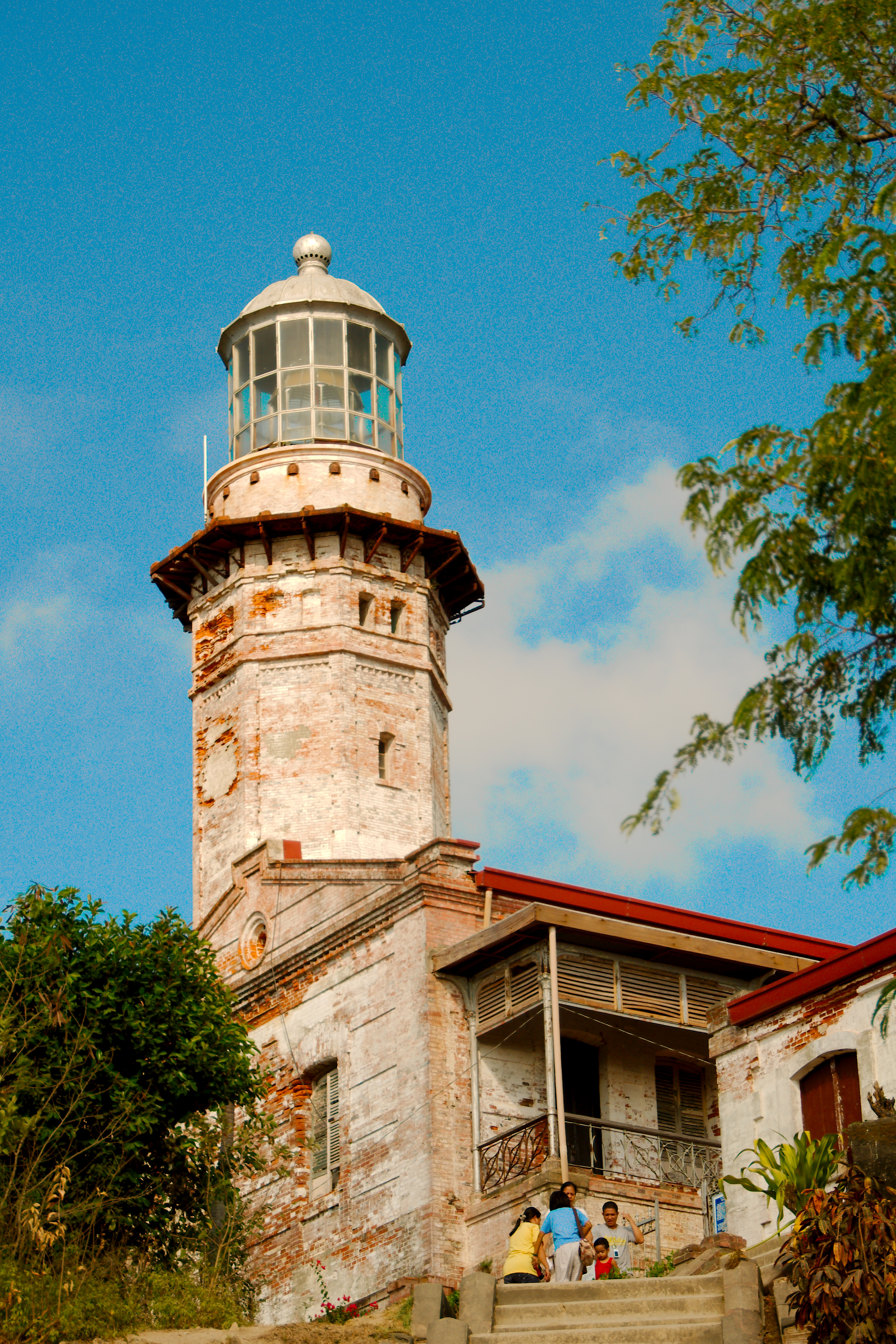
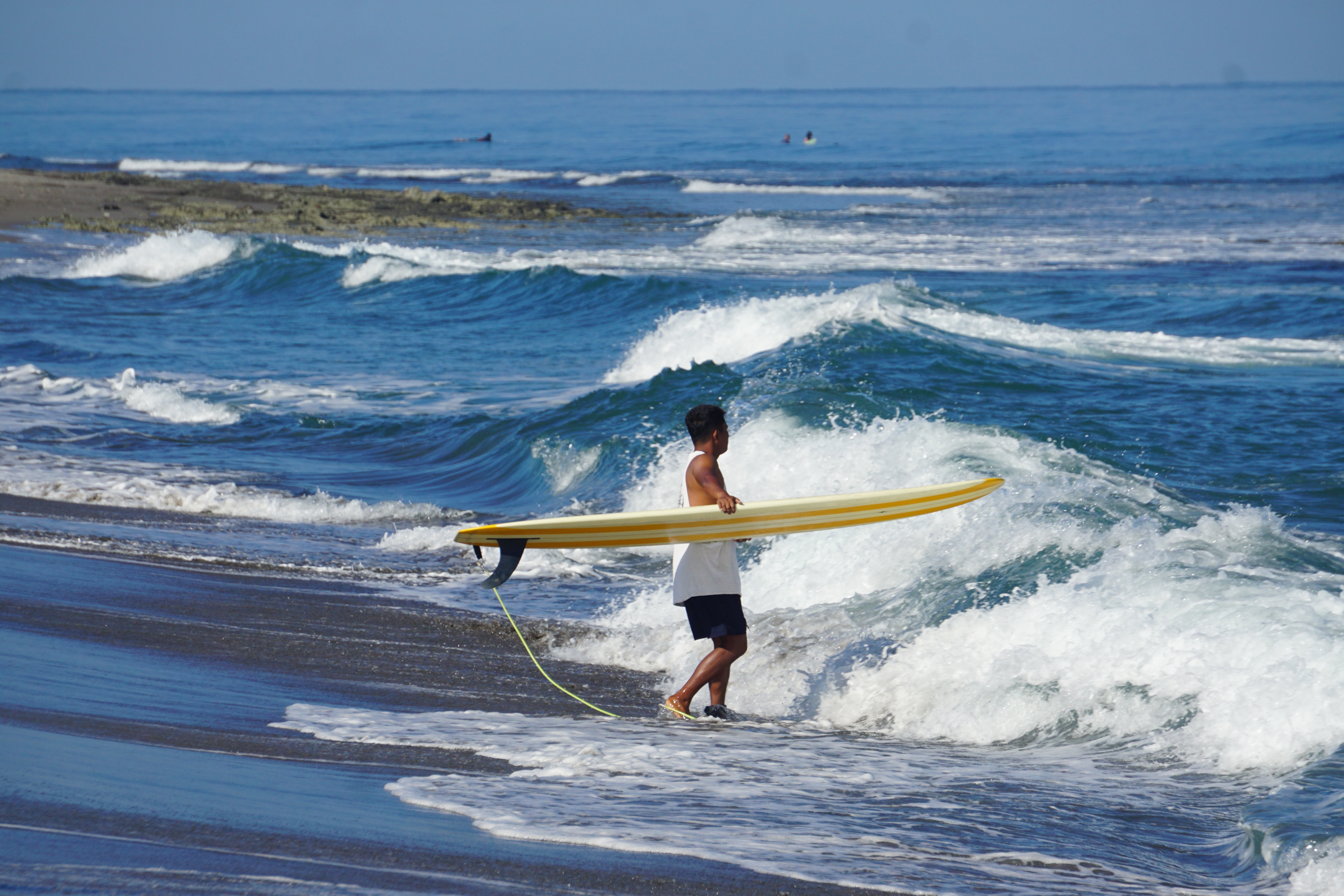
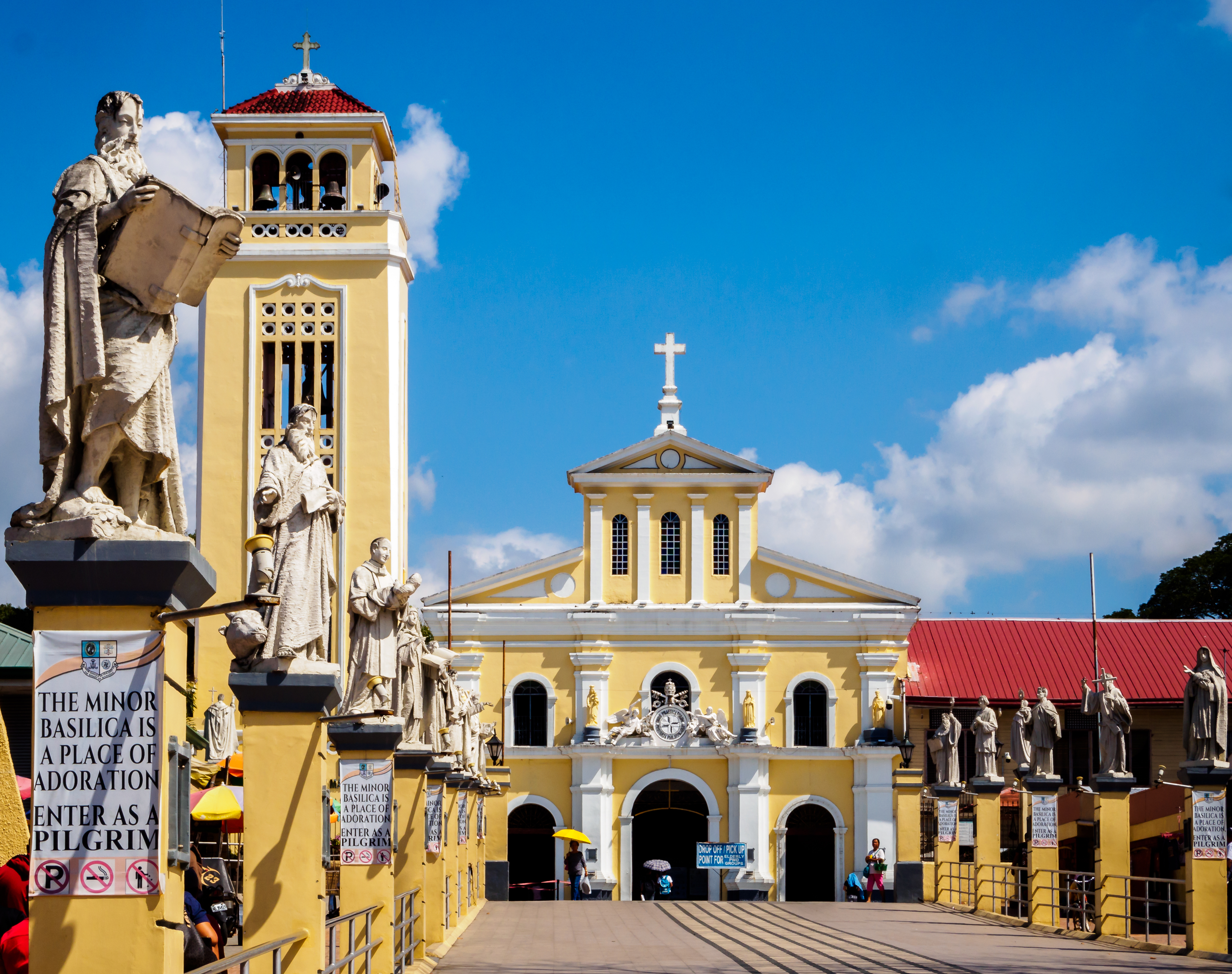
- Clockwise from the top: Paoay Church, Baluarte Watch Tower, La Paz Sand Dunes, Bangui Wind Farm, Elyu Surf, Manaoag Church, Cape Bojeador Lighthouse, Calle Crisologo, Hundred Islands National Park, Bantay Bell Tower
- Anthem: Region 1 Hymn
- Location in the Philippines
- Interactive map of Ilocos
- Coordinates: 16°37′N 120°19′E
- Country: Philippines
- Island group: Luzon
- Regional center: San Fernando (La Union)
- Largest city: San Carlos (Pangasinan)

Area
  - Total: 13,013.60 km^{2} (5,024.58 sq mi)
- Highest elevation (Mount Sicapoo): 2,361 m (7,746 ft)

Population (2024 census)
  - Total: 5,342,453
  - Density: 410.5284/km^{2} (1,063.264/sq mi)
  - Households: 1,306,256

Divisions
  - Provinces: 4: Ilocos Norte; Ilocos Sur; La Union; Pangasinan
  - Independent cities: 1: Dagupan
  - Component cities: 8: Alaminos; Batac; Candon; Laoag; San Carlos; San Fernando; Urdaneta; Vigan
  - Municipalities: 116
  - Barangays: 3,267
  - Districts: 12

Economy
  - Poverty incidence: 4% (2025)
  - GDP total: US$15.4 billion
  - GDP per capita: US$2,872
  - HDI (2023): 0.719 high · 9th of 17
- Time zone: UTC+8 (PST)
- PSGC: 010000000
- ISO 3166 code: PH-01
- Electorate: 3,633,900 voters (2025)
- Languages: Ilocano (Iloco); Pangasinan; Bolinao; Kankana-ey; Sambal; Itneg; Isnag; Ibaloi; English; Filipino

The Ilocos Region (Ilocano: Rehion/Deppaar ti Ilocos; Pangasinan: Rehiyon na Ilocos; Tagalog: Rehiyon ng Ilocos), designated as Region I, is an administrative region of the Philippines. Located in the northwestern section of Luzon, it is bordered by the Cordillera Administrative Region to the east, the Cagayan Valley to the northeast and southeast, Central Luzon to the south, and the West Philippine Sea to the west. The region comprises four provinces: Ilocos Norte, Ilocos Sur, La Union, and Pangasinan, along with one independent-component city, Dagupan City. The regional center is the city of San Fernando in La Union, which serves as the administrative hub of the region. The largest settlement in terms of population is San Carlos City in Pangasinan.

The 2020 Philippine Statistics Authority census reported that the ethnolinguistic group composition of the region is predominantly made up of Ilocanos (58.3%), followed by Pangasinans (29.7%), Tagalogs (4.1%), and various Cordilleran (Igorot) indigenous groups.

Natural attractions include hiking along the foothills of the Cordillera, scenic waterfalls and rivers, various surfing destinations with San Juan as the Surfing Capital of the North, beaches, and island-hopping in the Hundred Islands National Park. Cultural attractions include Spanish colonial buildings and structures, including two UNESCO World Heritage sites: the Baroque churches of Paoay, Ilocos Norte and Santa Maria, Ilocos Sur; and the colonial city of Vigan.

== History ==
=== Prehistory ===
The region was originally inhabited by Negritos as early as 30,000 BC but over time, these early settlers were displaced by successive waves of Austronesian migrants who arrived via the region's narrow coastal areas using traditional boats known as balangay boat (referred to as biray or bilog in Ilocano). The migrations are explained by the widely accepted "Out of Taiwan" hypothesis, which posits that Neolithic Austronesian peoples migrated from Taiwan, forming the ancestral populations of contemporary Austronesians.

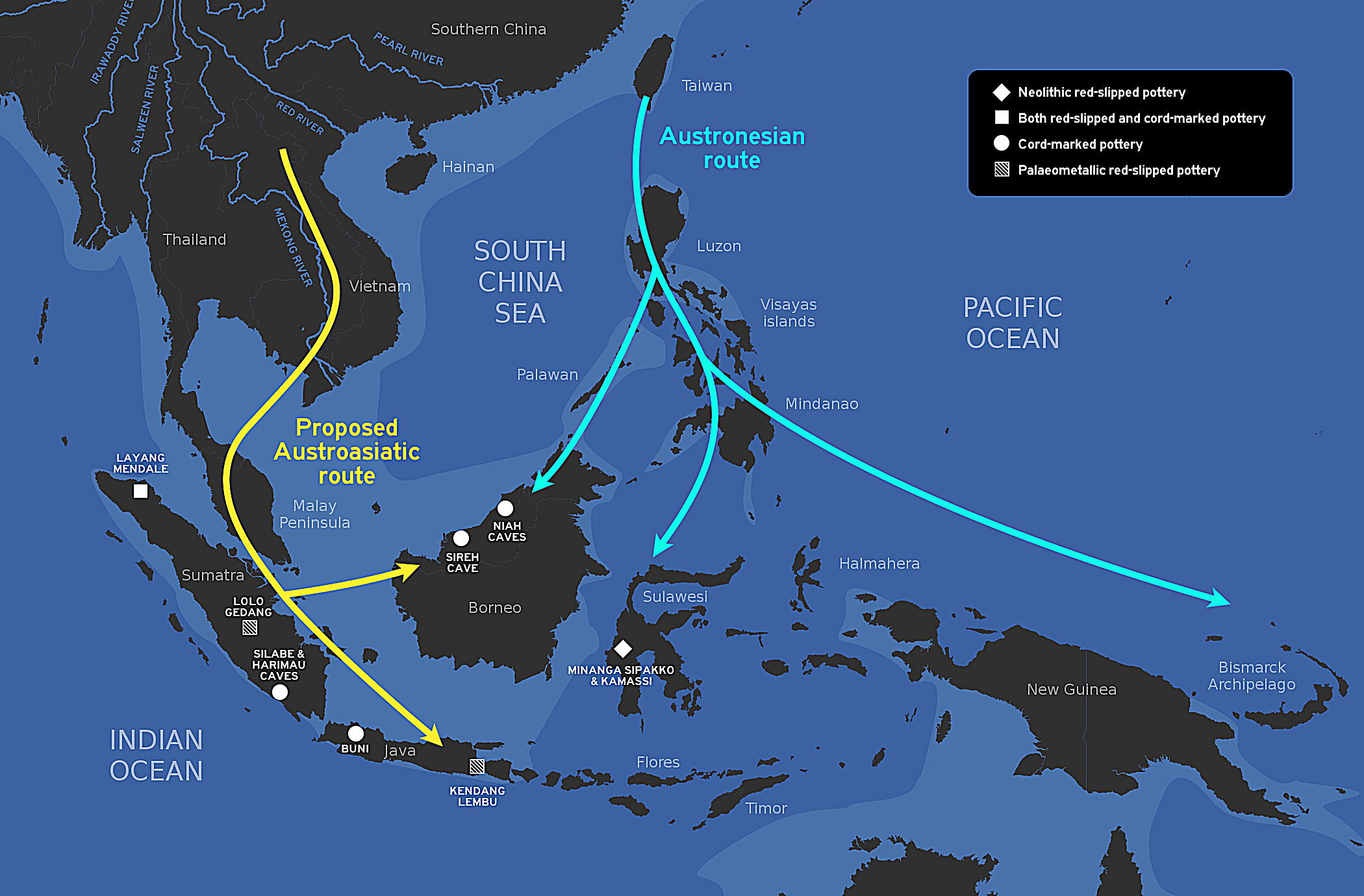
Map Depicting the Austronesian Migration from Taiwan

Austronesians are believed to have originated from Southern China or Taiwan and arrived in the Philippines through at least two major migration waves. The first wave, approximately 10,000 to 7,000 years ago, brought the ancestors of indigenous groups in the Cordillera Central mountain range. Subsequent migrations introduced additional Austronesian populations, along with agricultural practices, which eventually supplanted the languages of earlier inhabitants.

These Austronesian settlers included the Cordilleran (Igorot) groups, such as the Itneg (Tingguian) and the Isnag in the northern highlands, as well as the Kankanaey and Ibaloi in the southern highlands, who arrived during the first wave of migration. The second wave brought the Ilocanos, who settled in the northern coastal areas, alongside the Pangasinans, Bolinao and Zambals, who established communities in the southern and southwestern coastal zones.

=== Protohistory ===
With the establishment of maritime trading routes in Southeast Asia, settlements in the region flourished both culturally and economically through maritime trade.

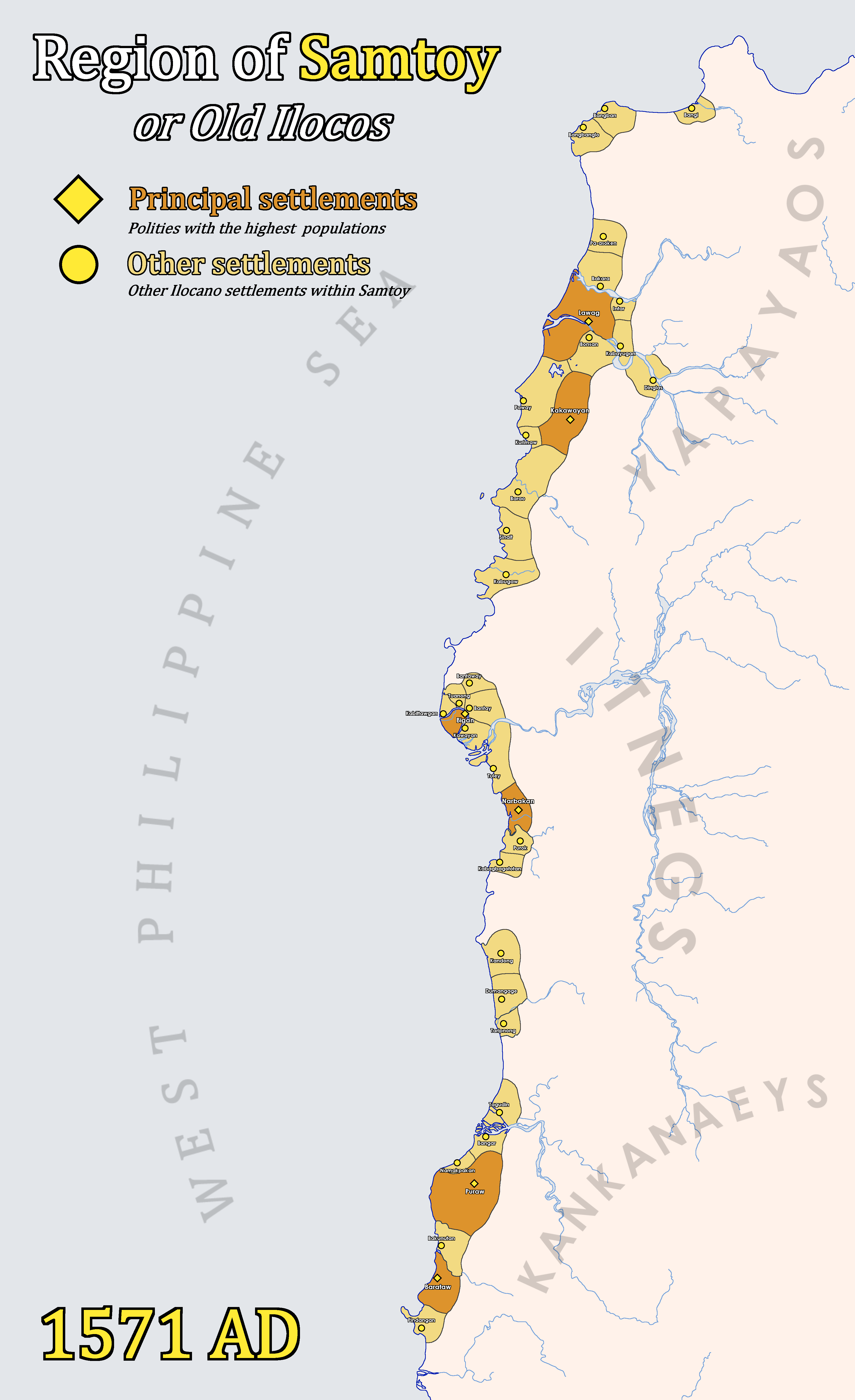
A map of Samtoy or Ilocos in 1571 before the advent of the Spaniards under Juan de Salcedo.

The Ilocanos, also known as Samtoy in pre-colonial times, actively traded goods and products with local and foreign merchants. Notable coastal trading hubs include Vigan, Candon, and Lingayen, which were frequented by the trade ships of Austronesian, Arab, Indian, Chinese, and Japanese traders.

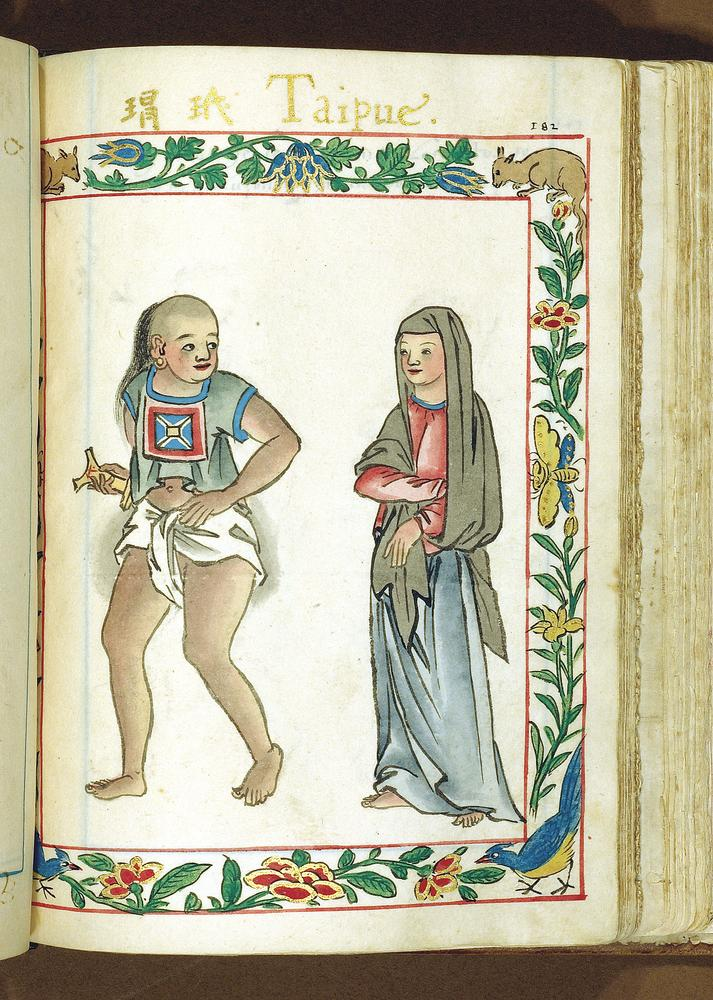
Possible Pangasinense inhabitants with kampilan, Boxer Codex (1590)

In the southern part of the region, the pre-colonial polity (panarian) of Caboloan was situated at the Agno River basin with Binalatongan as the capital, while Pangasinan was located at the delta and near the Lingayen Gulf, became a center for maritime trade. Gold mined from the Cordillera Mountain Range was transported along the Aringay-Tonglo-Balatok gold trail and traded in settlements like Agoo. At the time, Agoo's coastal shape made it an ideal harbor for foreign vessels.

This trade network connected the region to maritime routes spanning the Indian Ocean and the South China Sea. Goods exchanged included porcelain, silk (inabel), cotton, beeswax, honey, gemstones, beads, precious minerals, locally crafted burnáy (stoneware jars), and particularly gold.

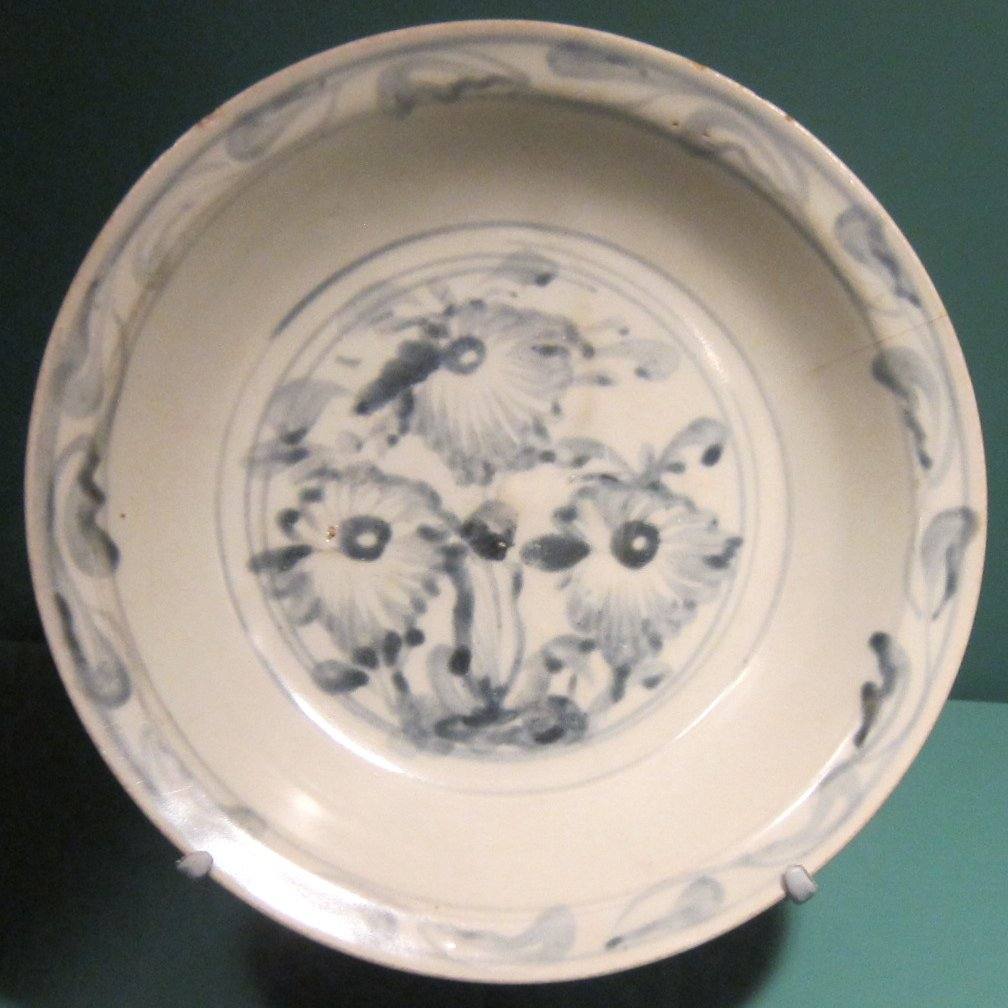
15th-century Chinese-Ming Dynasty porcelain

Evidence of this trade has been uncovered in the Pangasinense port of Agoo, where porcelain and ceramic or pottery fragments were found during renovations of the Catholic church. These artifacts are now preserved in the Museo de Iloko. Japanese fishermen later established one of their first settlements in the Philippines in Agoo, introducing advanced fishing techniques and technologies to the local population.

Another notable aspect of the region's early history is the discovery of the Bolinao Skull, which dates to the 14th or 15th century and is associated with the early inhabitants of Pangasinan. The skull is particularly notable for its dental ornamentation, with teeth inlaid with gold. It was found alongside 67 other similarly adorned skulls and trade ware ceramics from the early Ming Dynasty. This discovery highlights the advanced aesthetic traditions, burial, trade practices, and social structures of ancient Filipino communities, offering valuable insights into the region's precolonial culture and history.

=== Spanish colonization ===
A year after Miguel López de Legazpi declared Manila the capital of the Philippines on June 24, 1571, Spanish colonization efforts expanded to Northern Luzon to "pacify the people."

Spanish conquistador Martín de Goiti began the conquest of Pangasinan and established several Spanish settlements between 1571 and 1573. By April 5, 1580, Pangasinan became an administrative and judicial district of the province, with Lingayen as its capital. However, its territorial boundaries were first delineated in 1611, with the area originating from the Spanish settlement in Manila through Pampanga.

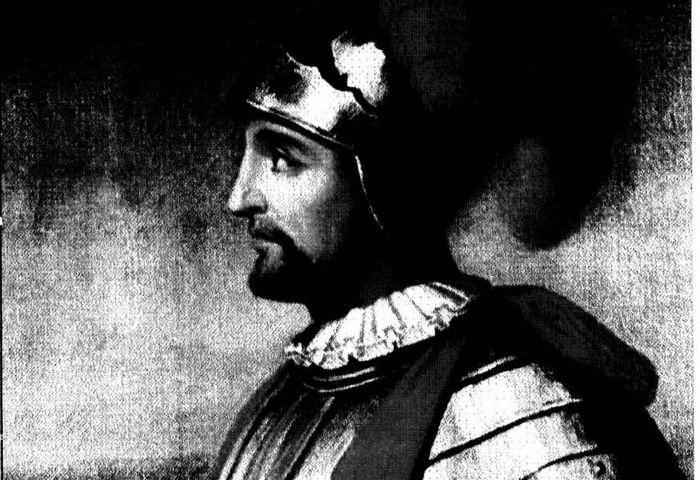
Portrait of Juan de Salcedo, 16th-Century Spanish Conquistador in the Philippines

On May 20, 1572, a year after Goiti's conquest, conquistadores led by Juan de Salcedo, the grandson of Legazpi, ventured northward with eight armed boats and 80 men. They sailed to Lingayen Gulf and landed at the mouth of the Agno River. In 1574, Limahong, a Chinese pirate, fled to Pangasinan after his fleet was driven away from Manila. Limahong attempted to establish a colony in Pangasinan but failed as an army led by Salcedo chased him out of the region after a seven-month siege.

Salcedo then continued his journey to Agoo, where he discovered a Japanese settlement and named it "El Puerto de Japón" after its conquest. He then reached Vigan on June 13, 1572, which had been a Chinese trading post from the Fujian province of China. In Vigan, he founded 'Villa Fernandina de Vigan' and made it the diocesan seat of Nueva Segovia in honor of King Philip II's son, Prince Ferdinand. Salcedo then proceeded to Laoag, Currimao, and Badoc, rounded the tip of Luzón, and continued to pacify the Bicol Region.

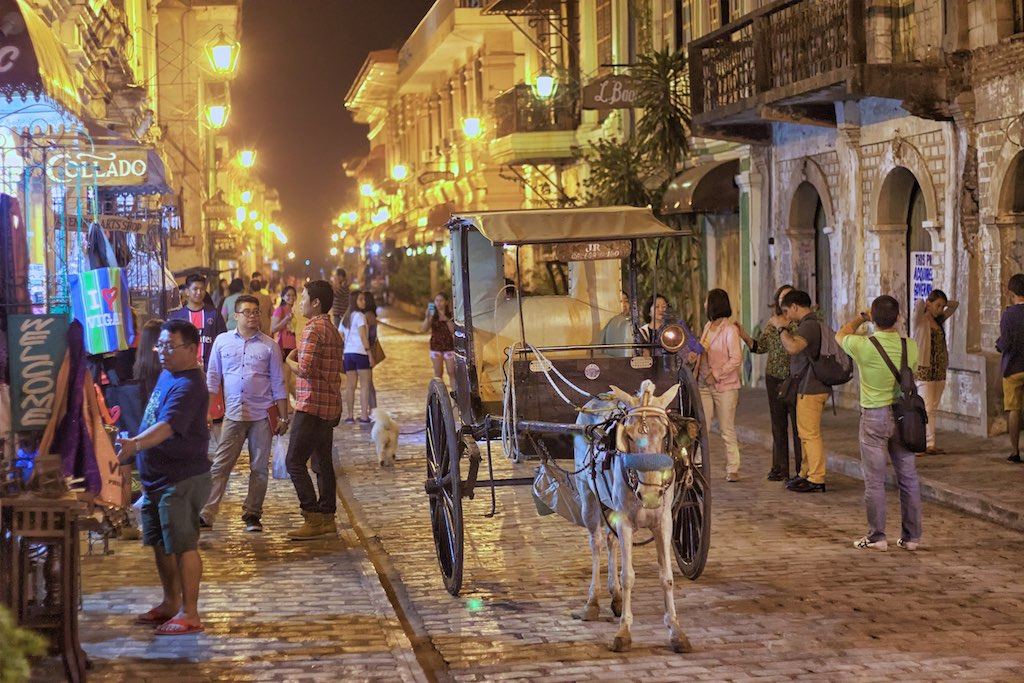
Villa Fernandina de Vigan is the diocesan seat of Nueva Segovia in the North

In 1574, Salcedo returned to Vigan with soldiers and Augustinian missionaries to initiate the evangelization of the Ilocos region. He established a Spanish city to control the neighboring territories and convert the native population to Catholicism.

As a reward for his services, Salcedo was granted the province of Ylocos, covering what is now Ilocos Norte, Ilocos Sur, Abra, La Union, and parts of Mountain Province, as his estate or encomienda. The other conquistadors from Mexico are also: Juan de la Isla, who was given Northern Luzon and received an encomienda following the expeditions; figures not preserved. Francisco de Saavedra, was also granted Northern Luzon, he was an early grant-holder; details fragmentary. and finally, Alonso de Contreras, given land in northern Luzon held an encomienda; tribute counts not specified.

He was also given the title Justicia Mayor de esta Provincia de Ylocos (Province Mayor of Ilocos). By the end of the 1700s, Ilocos had a population of 44,852 native families, 631 Spanish Filipino families, and 10,041 Chinese Filipino families.

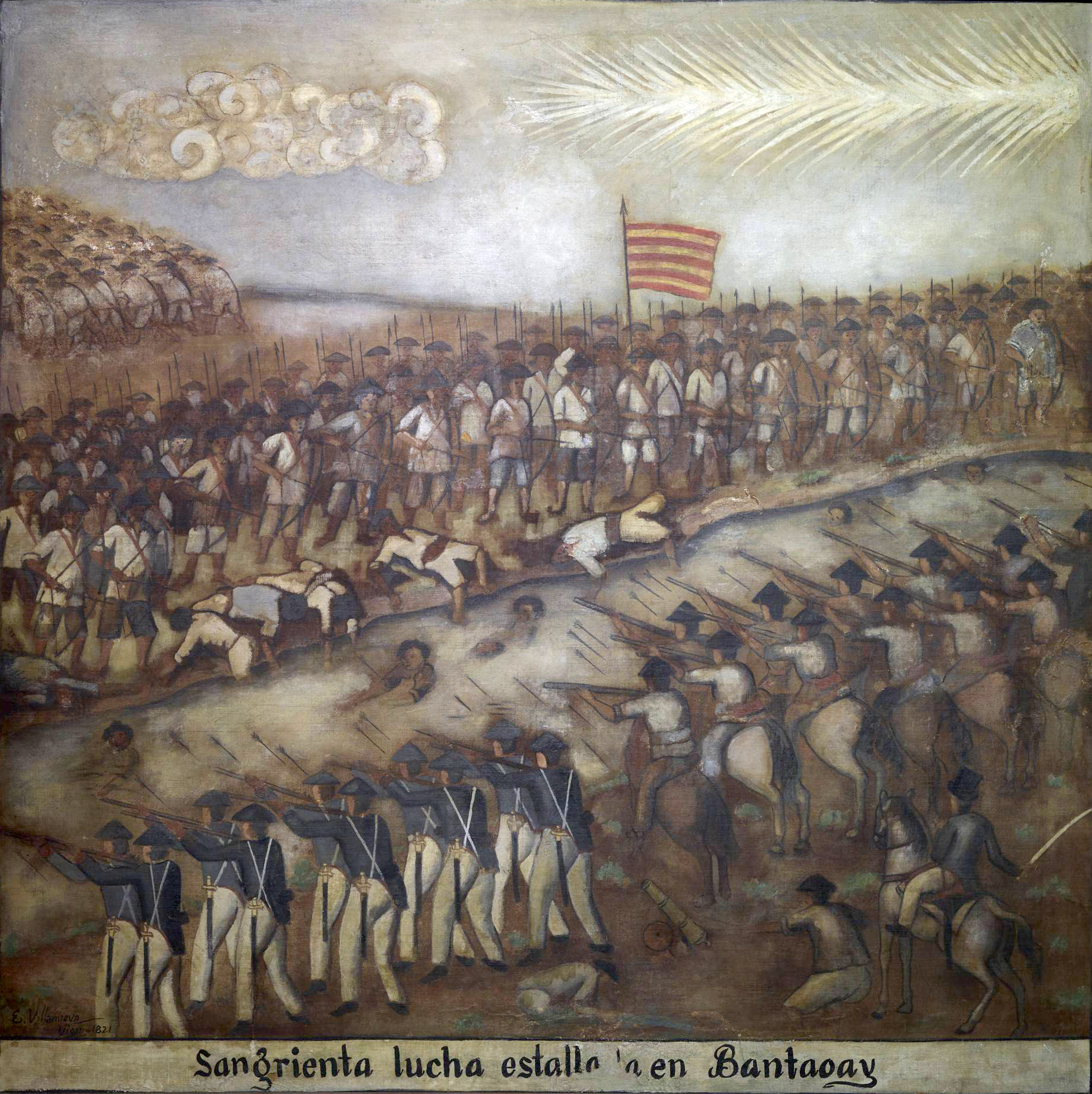
Portrait of the Bloody Basi Revolt between the Ilocanos and local Spanish in Bantaoay, c. 1807

Despite Spanish efforts, the Ilocanos in the northern parts of the region were less easily swayed and remained resistant to Spanish rule. These resentments led to several uprisings throughout the region's history, including the insurrections of Andrés Malong in 1660, Palaris of Pangasinan in 1762, Pedro Almazán in Ilocos Norte in 1661, Diego Silang and Gabriela Silang in 1764 and Basi Revolt in 1807. After the Basi Revolt, tensions culminated in the division of Ilocos into two provinces (Ilocos Norte and Ilocos Sur) on February 2, 1818. The Pangasinans in the south were the last to resist Spanish rule.

During the Philippine Revolution of 1896–1898, General Manuel Tinio allied with Emilio Aguinaldo to lead the revolution in Northern Luzon (Ilocos Siege), alongside General Francisco Makabulos. Makabulos led his forces to liberate Pangasinan and led revolutionaries in the Battle of Dagupan against the Spanish army. By August 1898, the revolutionaries had driven Spanish forces out of several towns, including Laoag, Ilocos Norte, marking a turning point in the revolution.

On June 12, 1898, General Emilio Aguinaldo proclaimed Philippine independence and became the first president of the Republic of the Philippines.

=== American colonization ===
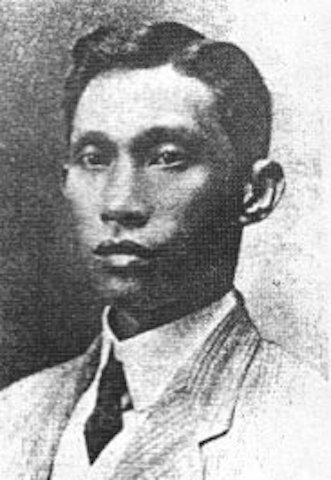
Gen. Manuel Tinio, the leader of the Philippine Revolution in Northern Luzon

The American colonization of the Ilocos Region began following the conclusion of the Spanish-American War in 1898, when the Philippines was ceded to the United States under the Treaty of Paris. This marked a period of profound transformation for the region, which came under American colonial administration after the Philippine-American War (1899–1902).

On November 18, 1899, American forces landed in the Ilocos Region in pursuit of Emilio Aguinaldo, the leader of the Philippine resistance. While American troops swiftly occupied towns, they faced persistent resistance in the rural areas (barrios), where guerrilla forces led by Gen. Manuel Tinio continued the struggle. Tinio, a veteran of the 1896 Philippine Revolution against Spain, orchestrated a widespread guerrilla campaign, harassing American forces in the countryside.

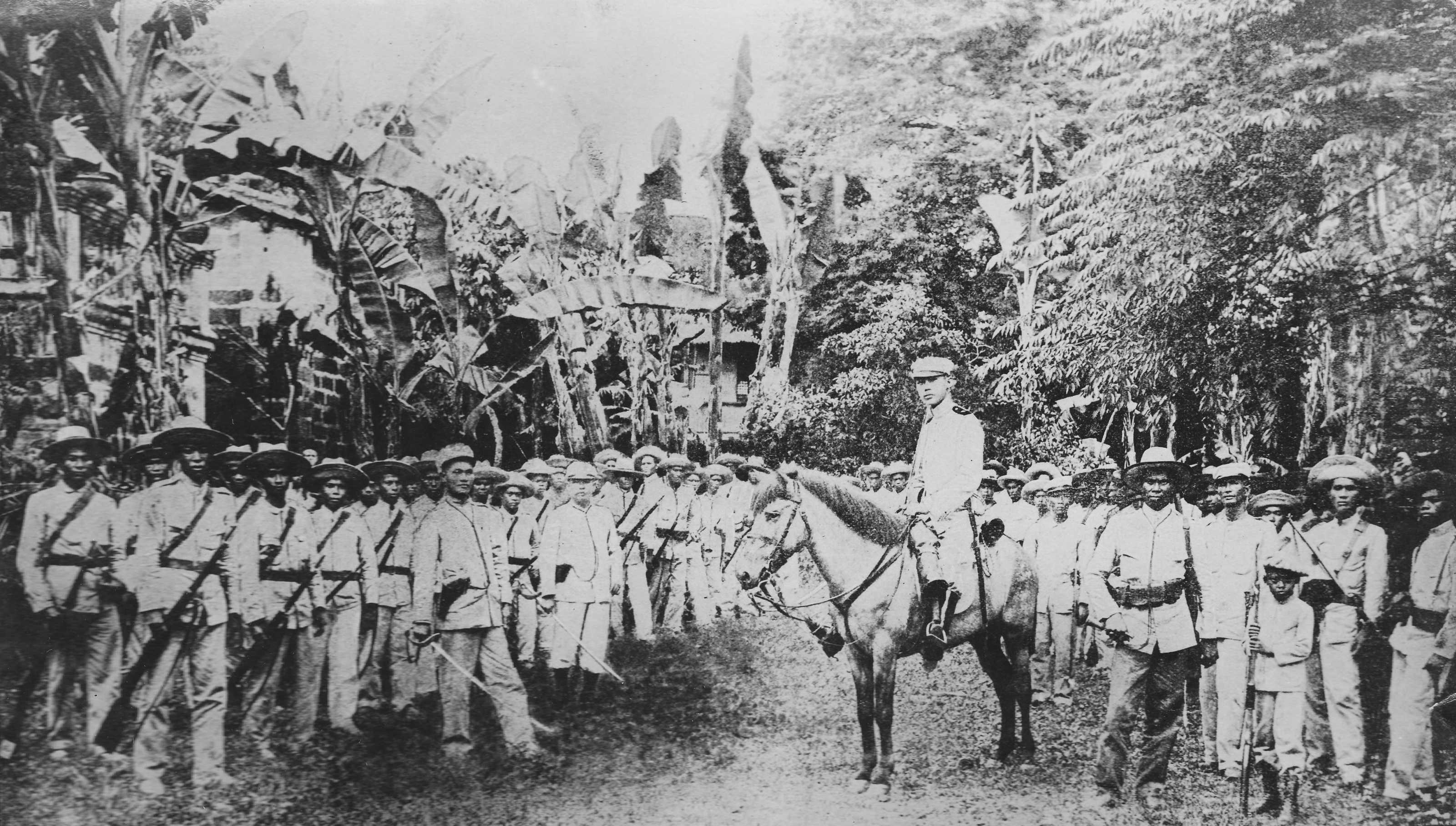
Gen. Gregorio del Pilar and His Troops, circa 1898, During the Philippine-American War

One of the most iconic events during this period was the Battle of Tirad Pass on December 2, 1899. Gen. Gregorio del Pilar and his 60 soldiers faced over 300 troops of the U.S. 45th Infantry Division, led by Gen. Peyton C. March. Despite a valiant defense, the Filipinos ultimately lost their position, marking a significant, albeit symbolic, moment in the resistance against American forces.

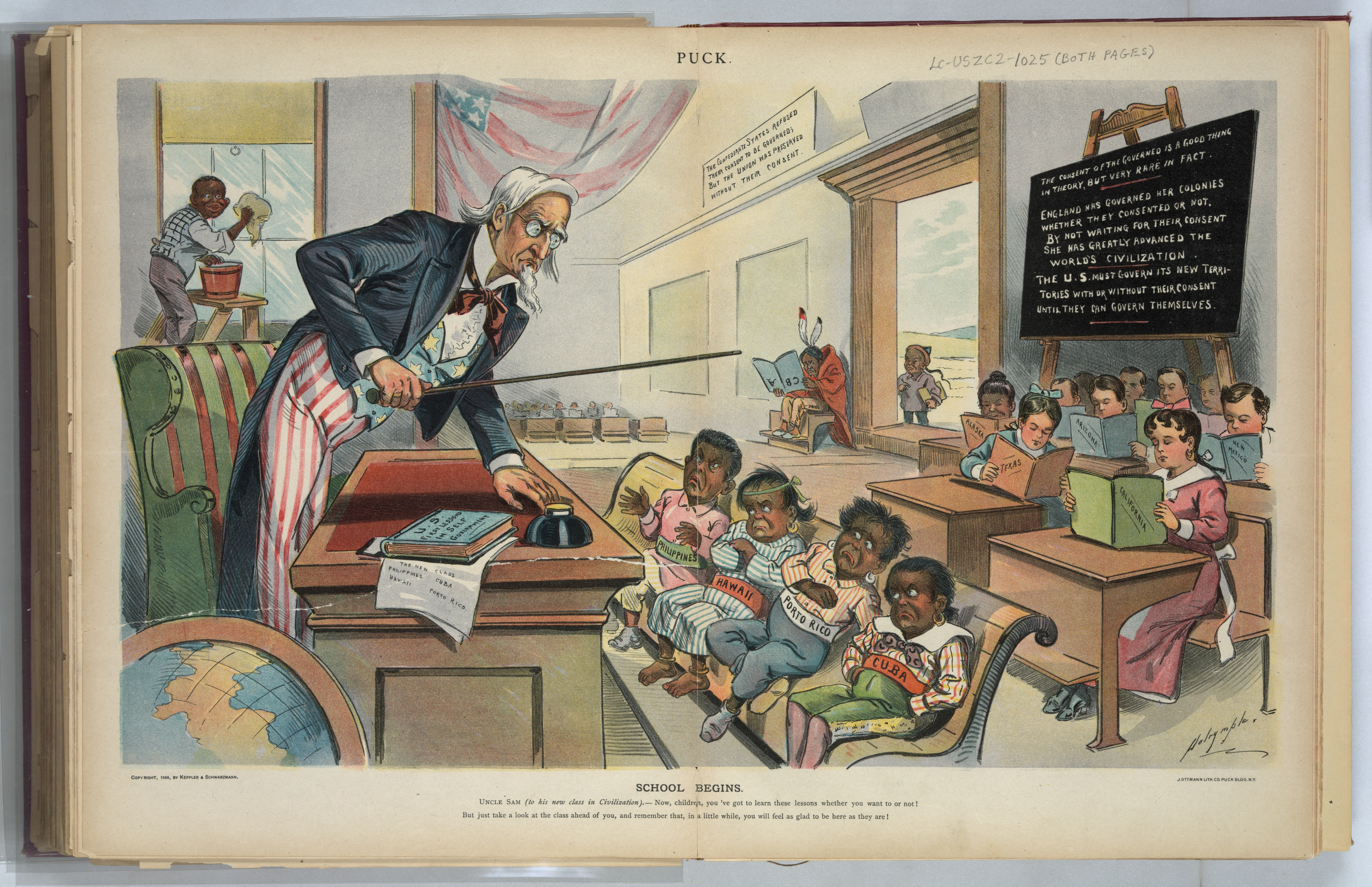
School Begins, a portrait of the imposition of American Imperial education in its territories

The Philippine-American War officially ended in 1902, following years of intense conflict, with the establishment of a Filipino civilian government under American oversight. Civil governance was introduced in the Ilocos Region, as well as the rest of the Philippines, on July 1, 1901, with William H. Taft serving as the first Civil Governor. The position was later renamed Governor-General by the U.S. Congress on February 3, 1903. One of the most notable reforms was the establishment of a centralized public school system in 1901, using English as the medium of instruction. To address a shortage of educators, the colonial government deployed 600 American teachers known as the Thomasites.

By September 1902, public secondary schools had been established across the region, including institutions in Lingayen (Pangasinan), Vigan and Santa Maria (Ilocos Sur), Bauang, Bacnotan, and San Fernando (La Union), and Laoag and Dingras (Ilocos Norte) with several US Thomasites serving as educators. The Taft Commission per instructions of US President McKinley introduced free primary education, designed to prepare citizens for civic duties. Additionally, church lands were purchased and redistributed following the disestablishment of the Catholic Church, further signaling the shift in socio-political structures under American rule.

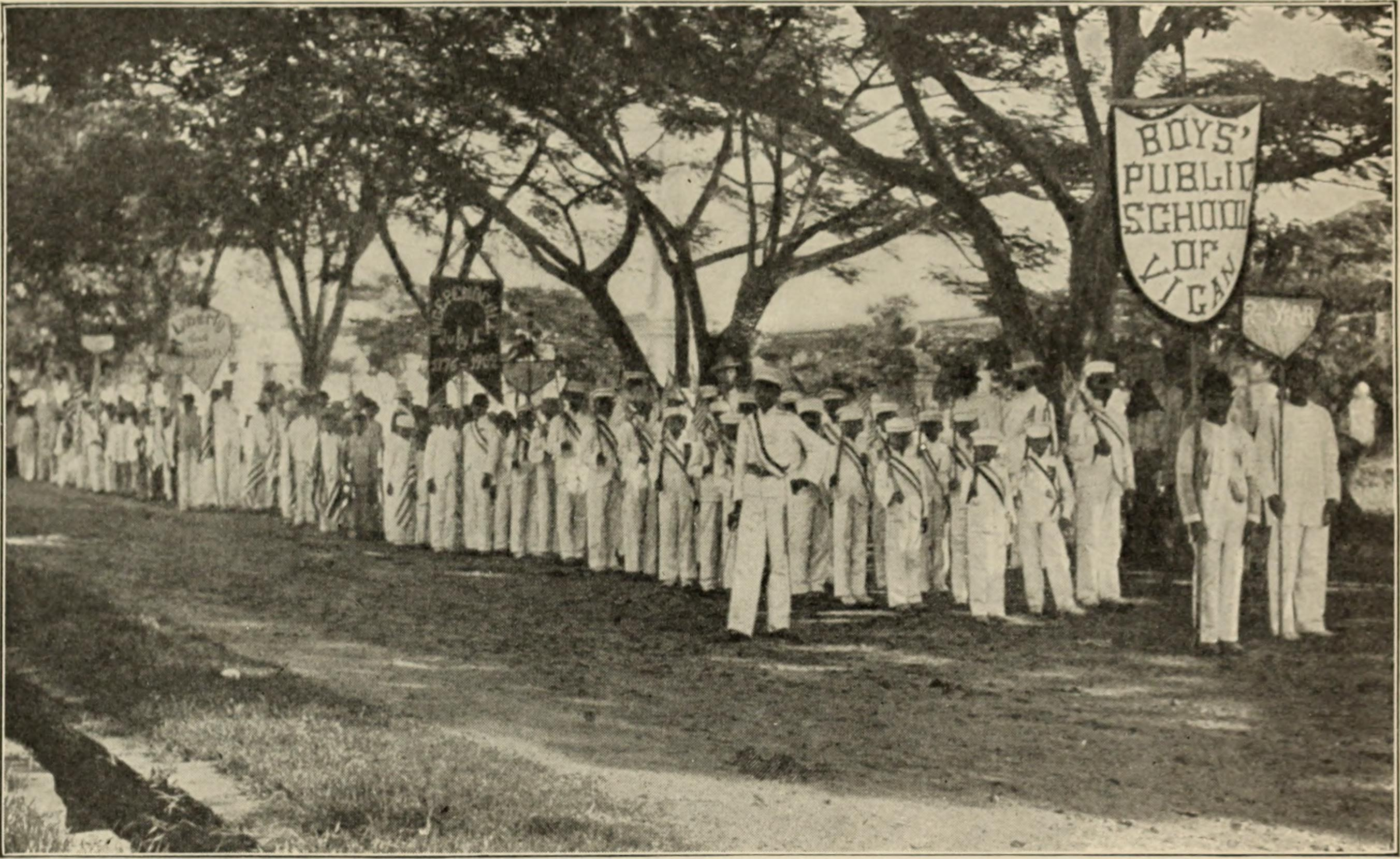
All Boys' Public School in Vigan, c. 1912

In 1901, several towns from Nueva Ecija including Balungao, Rosales, San Quintin, and Umingan were annexed to the province of Pangasinan. On November 30, 1903, additional municipalities from northern Zambales such as Agno, Alaminos, Anda, Bani, Bolinao, Burgos, Dasol, Infanta, and Mabini were transferred to Pangasinan. These towns, originally part of the homeland of the Sambal people, were reassigned due to their geographic distance from their original provincial capitals. Despite resistance from local communities, this decision has remained unchanged.

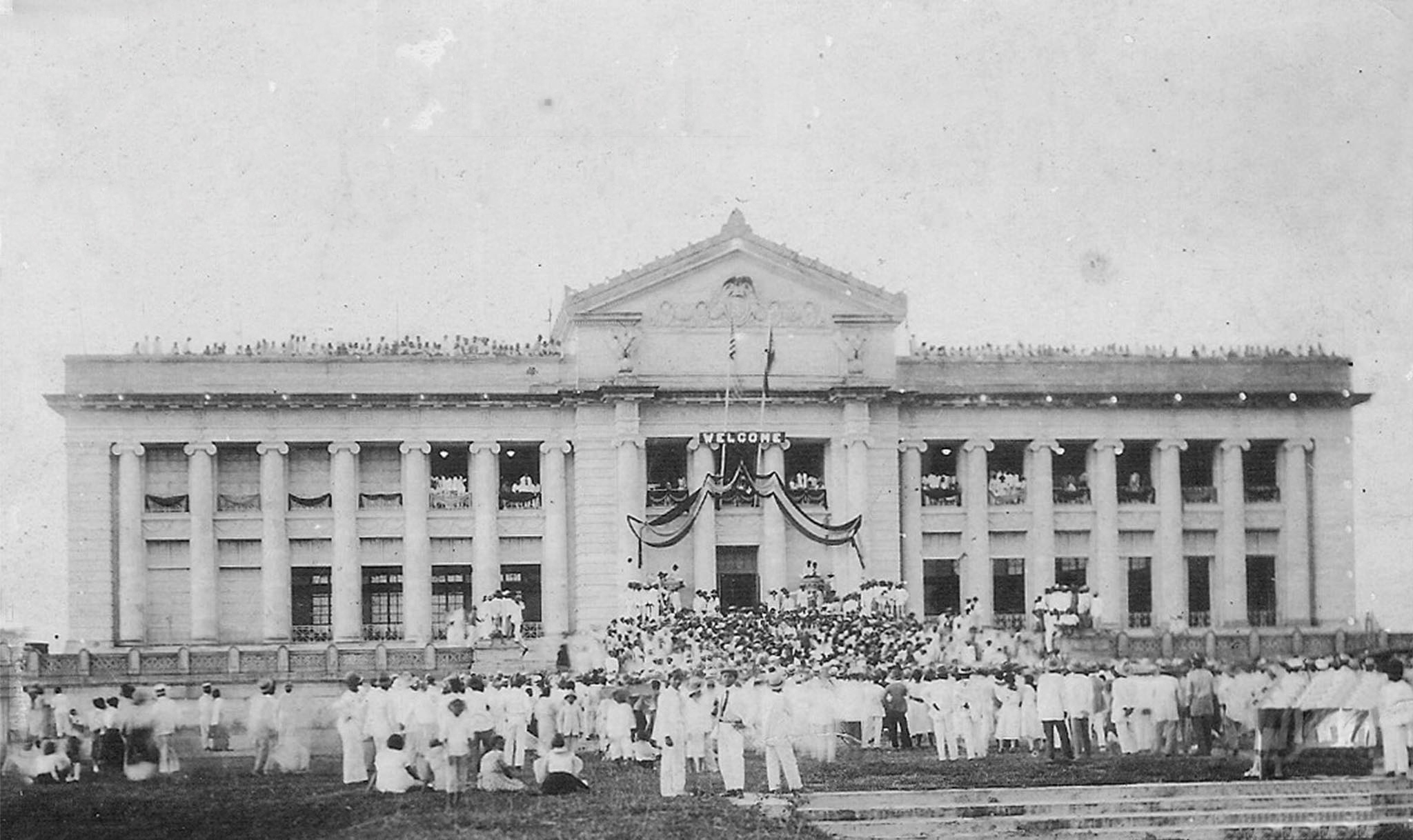
Inauguration of Pangasinan Provincial Capitol, c. 1918

Under the Philippine Organic Act of 1902, the Ilocos Region experienced significant political, economic, and social changes. Infrastructure development flourished, with the construction of public schools, bridges, railways, airports, and ports, enhancing the region's connectivity with other parts of the country.

However, these developments were accompanied by local unrest. Reports of war crimes, forced relocations, extrajudicial killings, and destruction of property by American forces fueled discontent among the population. While the introduction of modern governance and infrastructure brought progress, these human rights abuses left a lasting impact on the region's history.

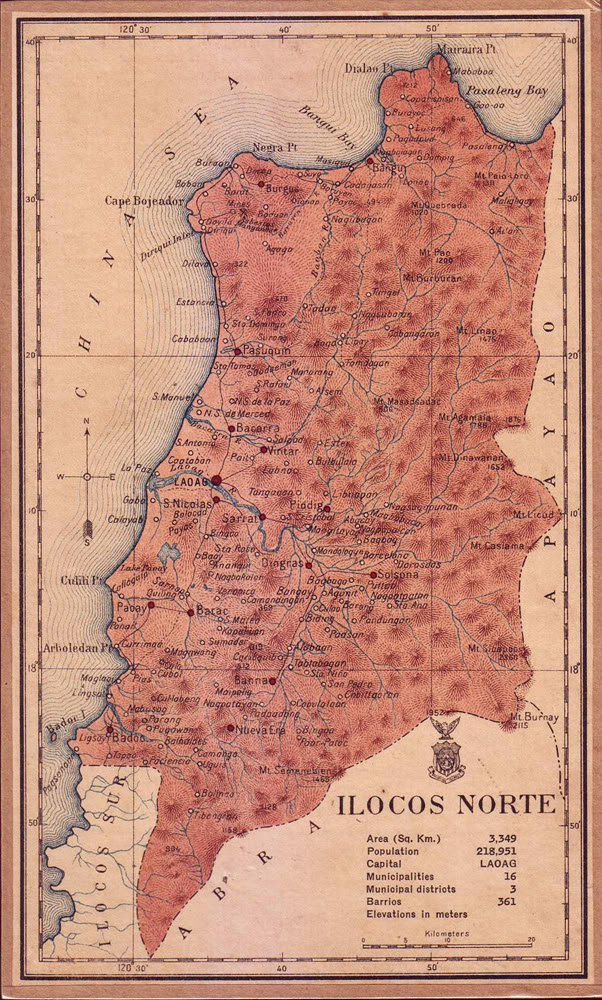
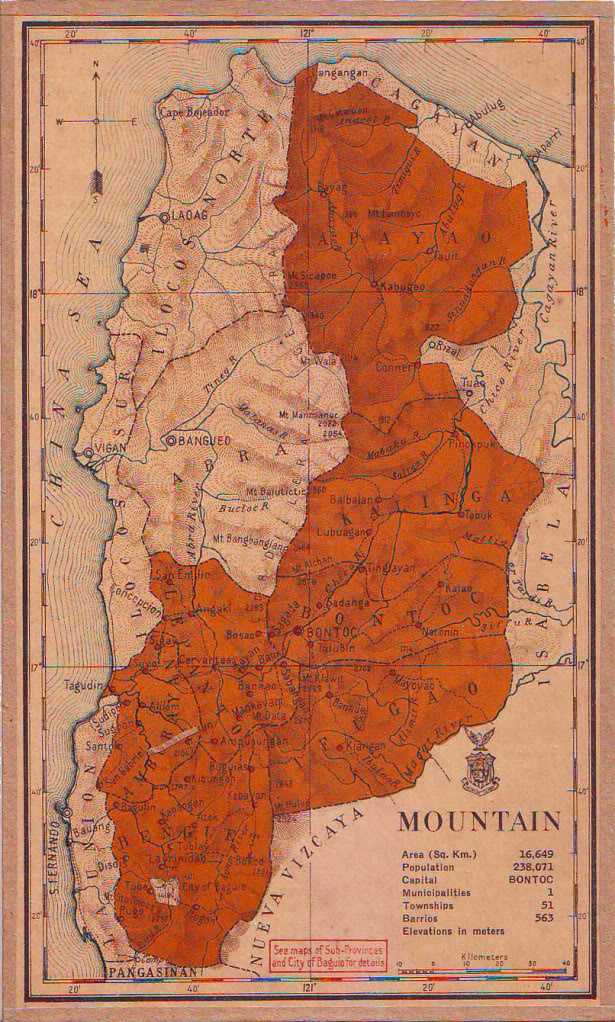
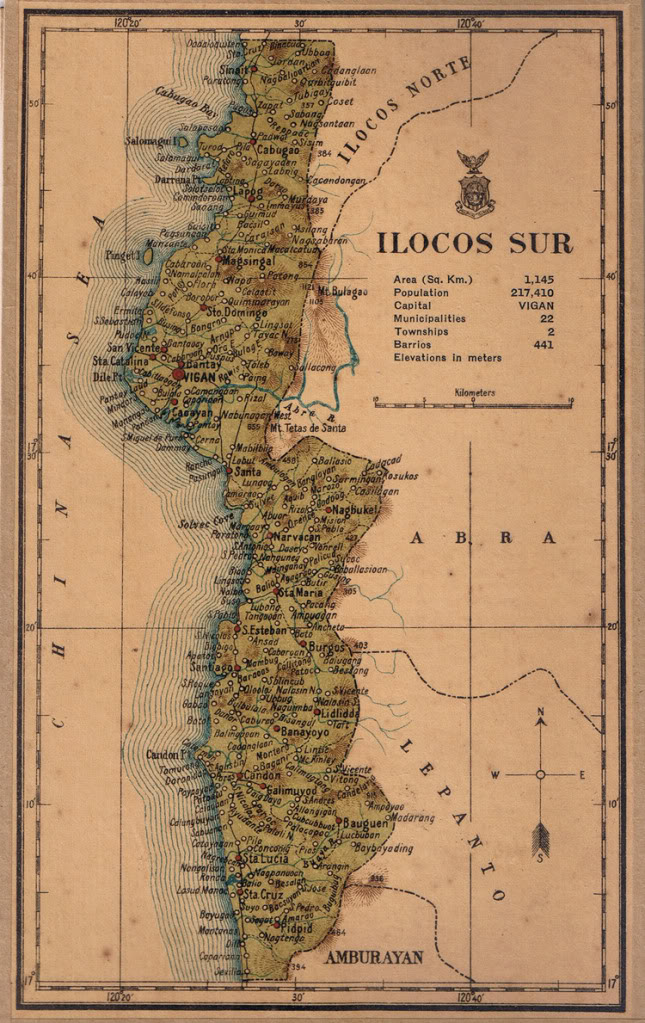
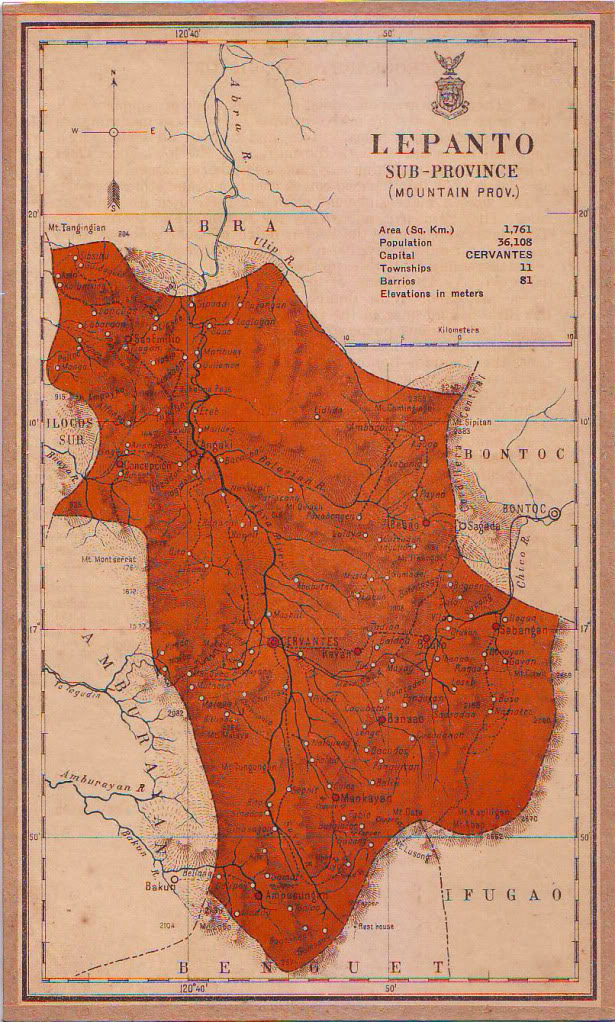
Map of Northwestern Luzon with its former territories and provinces, c. 1918

American colonization ended on July 4, 1946 in WWII's aftermath gaining Philippine Independence from the United States.

=== Japanese occupation ===
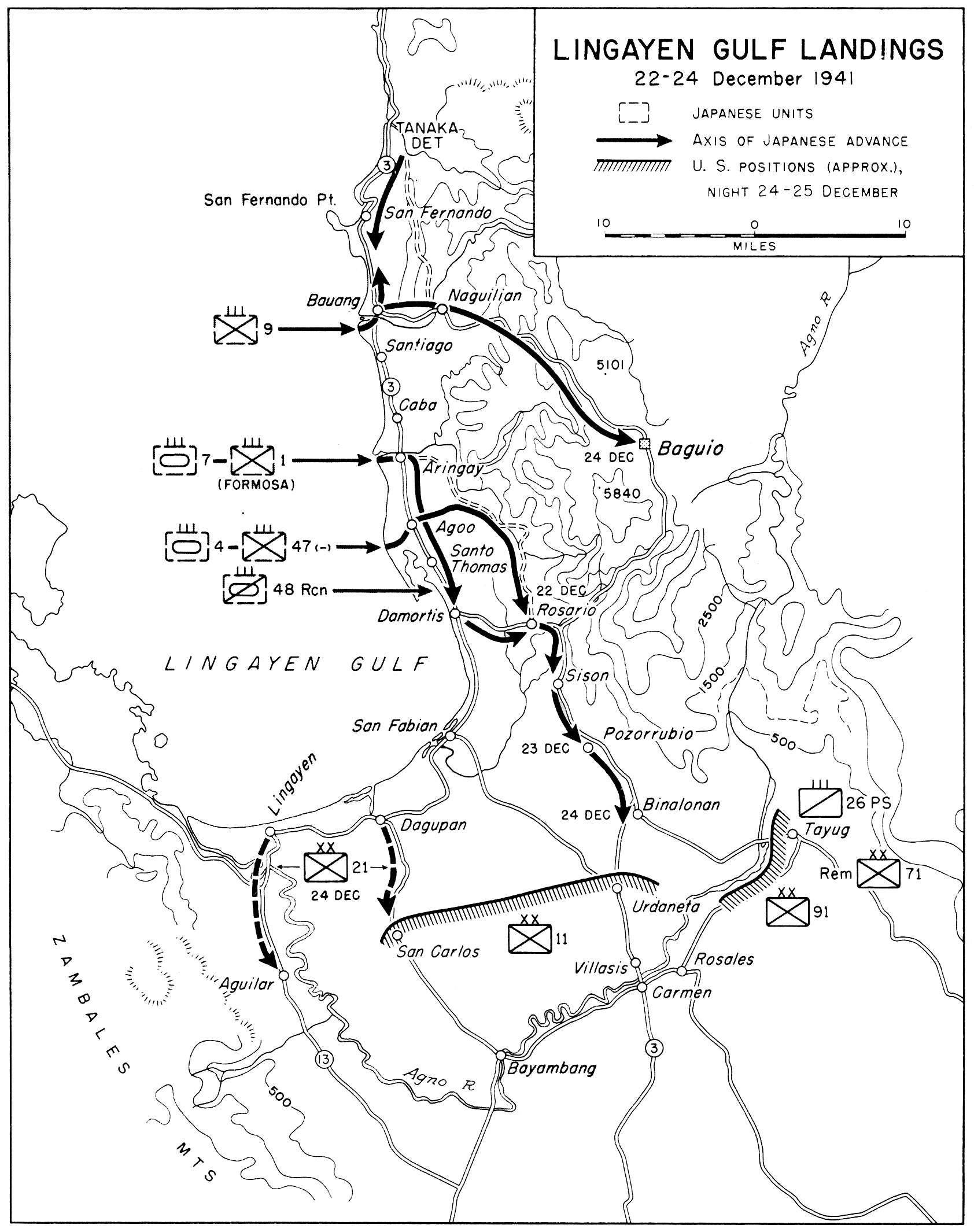
Japanese landings on Lingayen Gulf, 22 Dec 1941

The Japanese invasion of the Philippine Commonwealth began on December 8, 1941 during World War II, when Japan launched an attack on U.S. military installations and residential areas, following the attack on Pearl Harbor. Just two days later, the Japanese Kanno Detachment landed in Vigan, Ilocos Sur, aiming to secure airstrips for further military operations. Although initially unopposed, the landing was delayed by bad weather and American air attacks, which damaged Japanese ships and caused casualties. By December 11, the Japanese forces had successfully captured Vigan and dispatched additional troops to seize Laoag and its airfield. As American forces retreated, Lieutenan Gen. Masaharu Homma left a small garrison in Vigan and redirected the main forces to support operations at Lingayen Gulf.

By December 20, the combined forces of the Col. Kanno and Gen. Shizuichi Tanaka Detachments advanced south along Route 3. After overcoming Philippine defenses in Bacnotan, they reached San Fernando, La Union, by December 22. The Japanese 14th Army, commanded by Lieutenant General Masaharu Homma, had also landed at Lingayen Gulf, gaining control of key areas in Pangasinan and La Union. This marked the beginning of Japanese occupation of Northern Luzon, including the Lingayen Gulf region, which remained under Japanese control for three years, until it was recaptured by Allied forces in 1945.

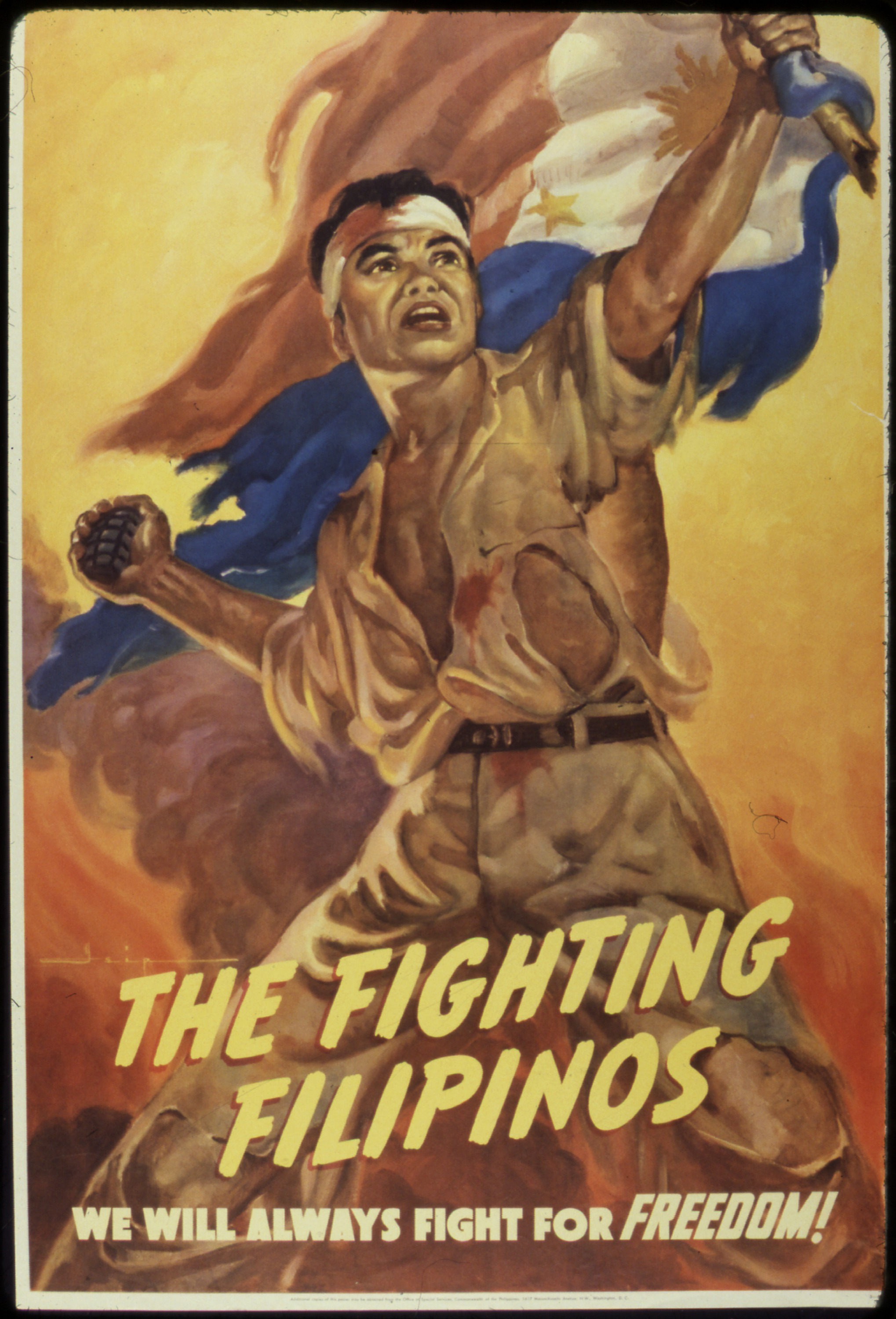
Propaganda poster of the widespread resistance movement

During the occupation, the region was part of the Japanese-controlled puppet republic led by President José P. Laurel. The local population endured widespread atrocities committed by the Japanese Imperial Army, including gang rape, sexual slavery (comfort women), torture, and other human rights violations. These brutal acts sparked significant resistance movements across the region, with several guerrilla groups forming to oppose the Japanese occupation. One prominent leader of the local resistance was Captain Candonino Villalon Gaerlan, who led a successful ambush against Japanese forces in Candon, Ilocos Sur, symbolizing local defiance against the invaders.

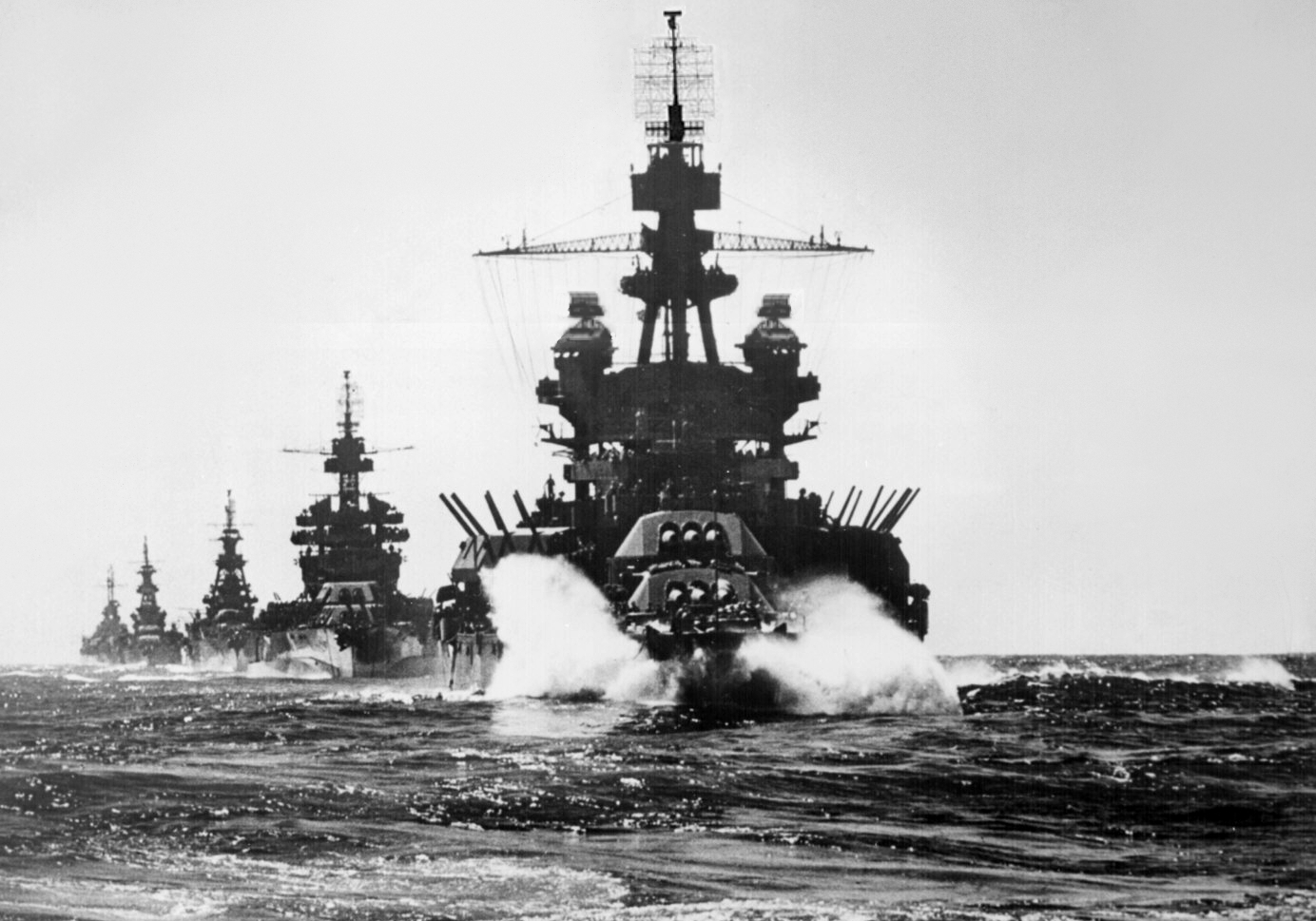
US Navy Battleship entering Lingayen Gulf, January 1945

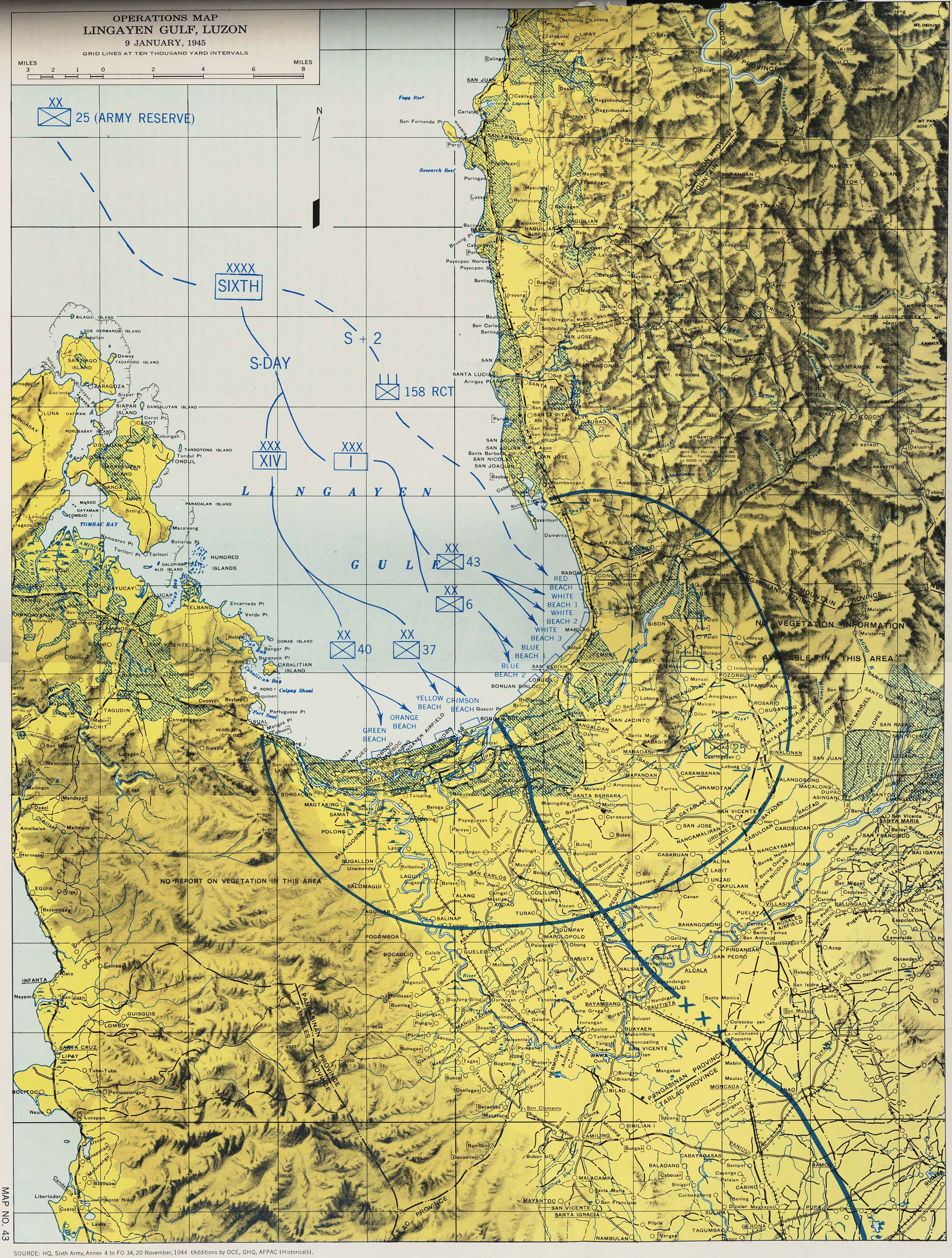
US Landing Areas for Assault Forces on Lingayen Gulf, January 1945

By 1944, with the United States beginning its campaign to liberate the Philippines, the region became a crucial focal point for military operations. On October 20, 1944, the Allied forces initiated the liberation of the Philippines, setting the stage for the Battle of Lingayen Gulf in early 1945. On January 6, 1945, the U.S. Navy, supported by the Royal Australian Navy, began heavy bombardments of Japanese coastal defenses and infrastructure, lasting until January 8. Japanese kamikaze attacks targeted Allied vessels from January 7 to 9, but despite the damage, the U.S. Navy maintained control of the Gulf, securing it for the imminent invasion.

On January 9, known as S-Day, Gen. Douglas MacArthur and U.S. Army forces from the Sixth Army landed on a 25-mile beachhead between Lingayen and San Fabian. The landings, supported by over 800 ships and extensive air support, faced light resistance, as the Japanese had concentrated their defenses inland. By January 15, 1945, Allied forces had firmly secured the Lingayen Gulf region and began advancing into the heart of Luzon, paving the way for the liberation of Manila and the eventual defeat of Japanese forces in the Philippines.

=== Postwar period ===
The Ilocos region produced two presidents of the Republic of the Philippines within the first two decades after the recognition of Philippine independence: Elpidio Quirino and Ferdinand Marcos.

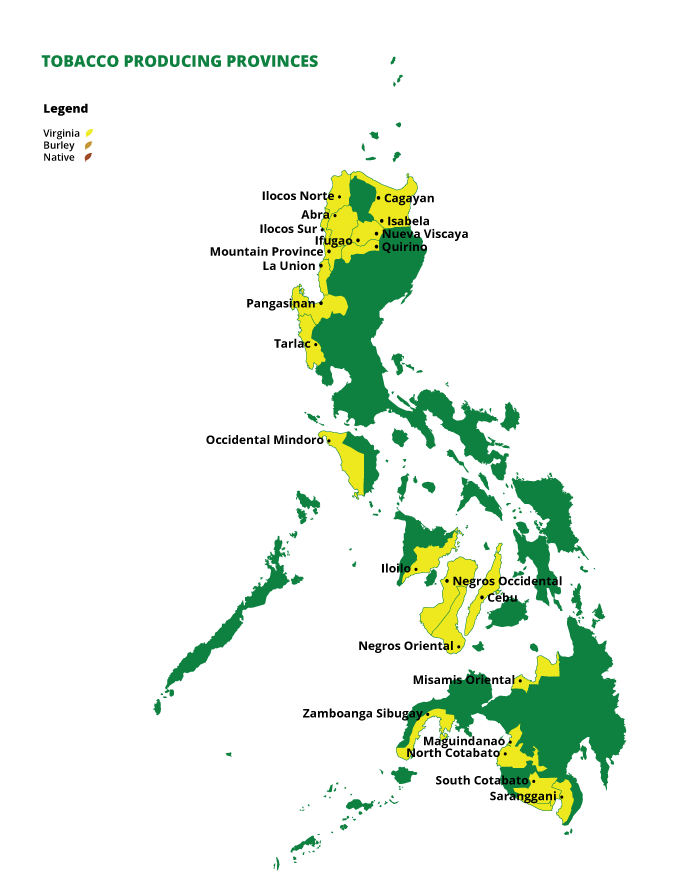
Tobacco-producing provinces in the Philippines, including the four provinces in the region

This period also marked a return of the tobacco industry to the Ilocos Region. Ever since the end of the tobacco monopoly, tobacco production had declined in the Ilocos as Filipinos started shifting from locally made cigars to foreign made cigarettes. But after reading a feature article series by Maximo Soliven which explained why Virginia tobacco would grow well on Ilocos soil, businessman Harry Stonehill was convinced to invest extensively in rebuilding the industry, establishing the Philippine Tobacco Flue-Curing and Redrying Corporation (PTFCRC) in 1951 and recruiting farmers from throughout Region 1 to produce tobacco. The following year, La Union Congressman Manuel T. Cases filed a bill to "limit the importation of foreign leaf tobacco," which was eventually signed by President Elpidio Quirino as Republic Act 698. This allowed Stonehill's investments to make a handsome profit, and the newly rebuilt local industry to bloom. Stonehill was later deported a decade later, in the 1960s, for tax evasion and bribery of government officials, in what would later be called the Stonehill scandal, but the tobacco industry continued to grow.

=== Rule under Ferdinand Marcos ===
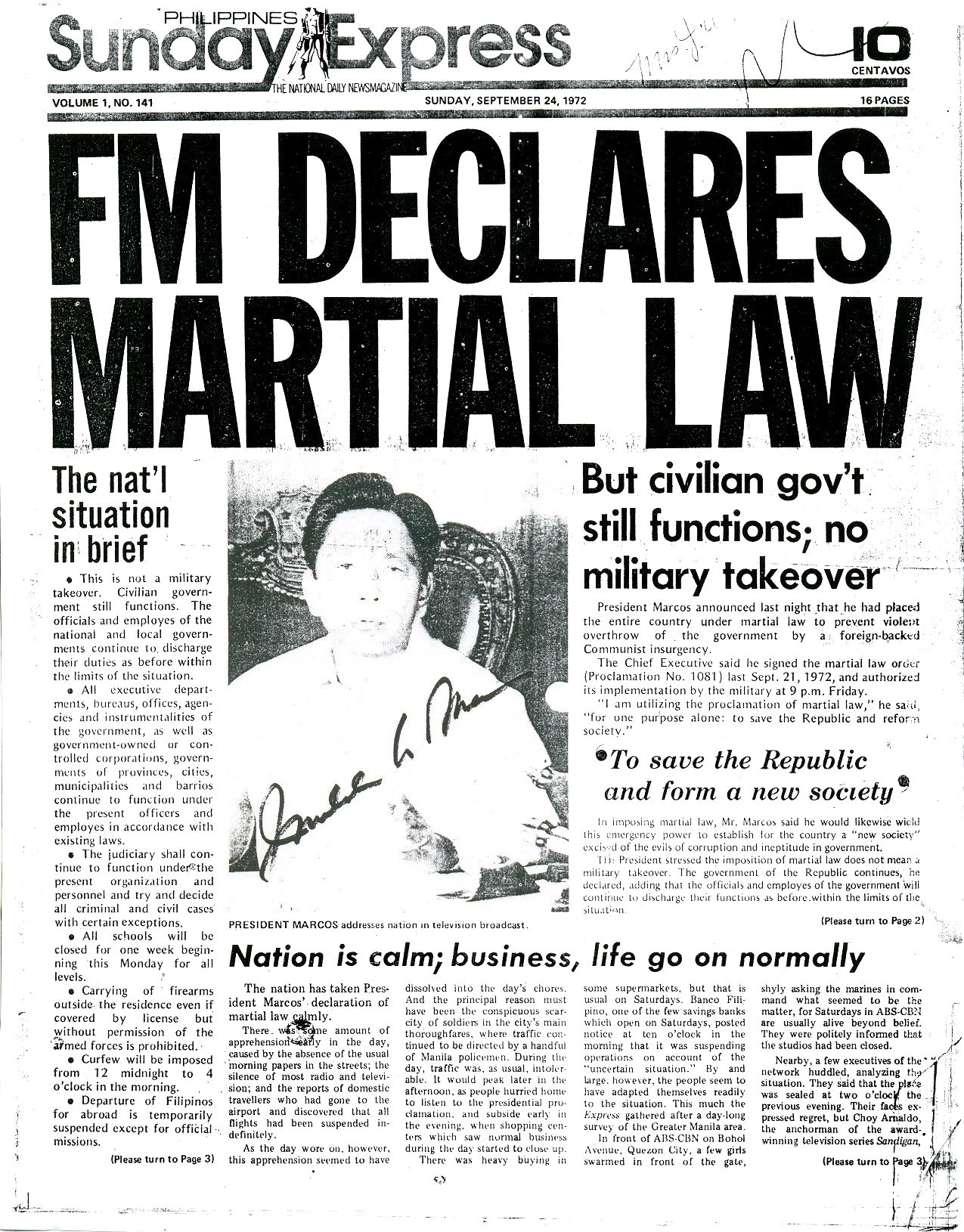
The declaration of Martial Law in the Philippines was announced via the Philippines Daily Express on September 24, 1972

Various human rights violations were documented in the Ilocos region during the Marcos martial law era, despite public perception that the region was supportive of Marcos' administration. In Ilocos Norte, various farmers from the towns of Vintar, Dumalneg, Solsona, Marcos, and Piddig were documented to have been tortured, and eight farmers in Bangui and three indigenous community members in Vintar were "salvaged" in 1984.

Ilocanos who were critical of Marcos' authoritarian rule included Roman Catholic Archbishop and Agoo, La Union native Antonio L. Mabutas, who spoke actively against the torture and killings of church workers. Other La Union natives who fought the dictatorship were student activists Romulo and Armando Palabay of San Fernando, La Union, whose torture and death in a military camp in Pampanga would lead them to being honored as martyrs in the fight against the dictatorship in the Philippines' Bantayog ng mga Bayani memorial.

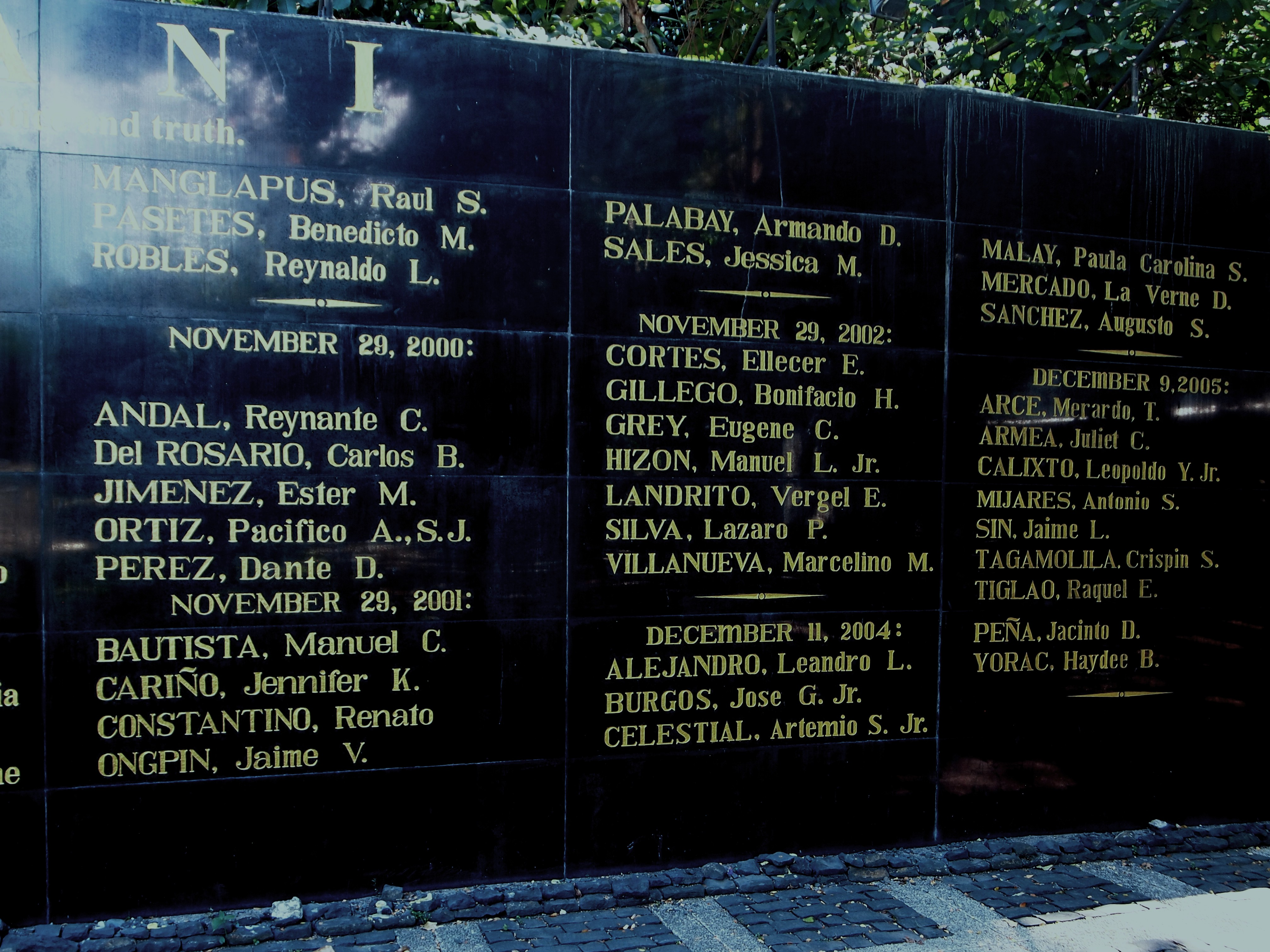
The Wall of Remembrance at Bantayog ng mga Bayani honors those who resisted the martial law regime

In Ilocos Norte, one of the prominent victims of the Martial Law era who came from Laoag was Catholic layperson and social worker Purificacion Pedro, who volunteered in organizations protesting the Chico River Dam Project in the nearby Cordillera Central mountains. Wounded while visiting activist friends in Bataan, she was later killed by Marcos administration soldiers while recuperating in the hospital. Another prominent opponent of the martial law regime was human rights advocate and Bombo Radyo Laoag program host David Bueno, who worked with the Free Legal Assistance Group in Ilocos Norte during the later part of the Marcos administration and the early part of the succeeding Aquino administration. He would later be assassinated by motorcycle-riding men in fatigue uniforms on October 22, 1987 – part of a wave of assassinations which coincided with the 1986-87 coup d'état which tried to unseat the democratic government set up after the 1986 People Power Revolution. Both Bueno and Pedro were later honored among the first 65 people to have their names inscribed on the wall of remembrance of the Philippines' Bantayog ng mga Bayani, which honors the martyrs and heroes who fought the dictatorship, and Pedro was listed among Filipino Catholics nominated to be named Servant of God.

=== Integration and realignment ===
The integration of provinces into the Ilocos Region has evolved over time, shaped by political decisions aimed at administrative restructuring and cultural integration.

In 1973, Presidential Decree No. 1, issued by President Ferdinand Marcos, transferred the province of Pangasinan from Region III (Central Luzon) to Region I (Ilocos Region). Before this decree, Pangasinan had not been part of the Ilocos Region.

During the same period, the provinces of Mountain Province and Benguet were also included in the Ilocos Region. Abra was already part of Ilocos Region before 1973.

On July 15, 1987, President Corazon Aquino issued Executive Order No. 220, creating the Cordillera Administrative Region (CAR). This order transferred Abra, Mountain Province, and Benguet from the Ilocos Region to the newly established CAR, recognizing the Cordillera's indigenous peoples' unique cultural and historical identities.

As of today, the Ilocos Region consists of four provinces: Ilocos Norte, Ilocos Sur, La Union, and Pangasinan. Meanwhile, Abra, Mountain Province, and Benguet are part of the Cordillera Administrative Region.

=== Contemporary history ===
The Ilocos region has produced 3 more Philippine Presidents in the years since the 1986 People Power revolution: Pangasinense Fidel V. Ramos, Gloria Macapagal Arroyo (Ilocano on mother's side), and Ferdinand Marcos' son Bongbong Marcos.

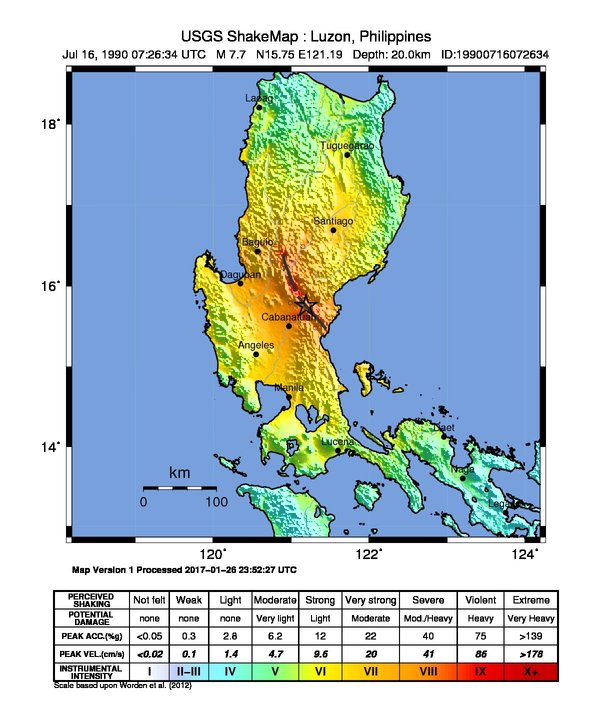
1990 Luzon earthquake intensity map

The southern parts of the region were severely hit by the 1990 Luzon earthquake. Five municipalities in La Union were affected: Agoo, Aringay, Caba, Santo Tomas, and Tubao with a combined population of 132,208. Many buildings, including the Agoo Municipal hall, the Museo de Iloko, the parish church of Aringay, and the Basilica Minore of our Lady of Charity, collapsed or were severely damaged. Sitio Nagpanauan in Aringay completely submerged when the sea level rose and the land collapsed during the earthquake. 100,000 families were displaced when two coastal villages sank due to liquefaction. The province suffered many casualties leaving 32 people dead. In Pangasinan, about 90 buildings in Dagupan were damaged, and about 20 collapsed. Some structures sustained damage because liquefaction caused buildings to sink as much as 1 metre (39 inches). The earthquake caused a decrease in the elevation of the city and several areas were flooded. The city suffered 64 casualties of which 47 survived and 17 died. Most injuries were sustained during stampedes at a university building and a theater.

== Geography ==
The Ilocos Region, situated in the northwestern part of Luzon, Philippines, encompasses a total land area of 12,840.2 square kilometers. Of this area, 810,062 hectares are classified as alienable and disposable land, while 473,957 hectares are designated as forest land. The region is strategically positioned with direct access to international sea lanes and features diverse geographical landscapes. It is bordered by the South China Sea to the west and the Central Cordillera Mountain Range to the east. In contrast, Pangasinan occupies the northwestern section of the vast Central Luzon Plain, with the Zambales Mountains forming its natural western boundary.

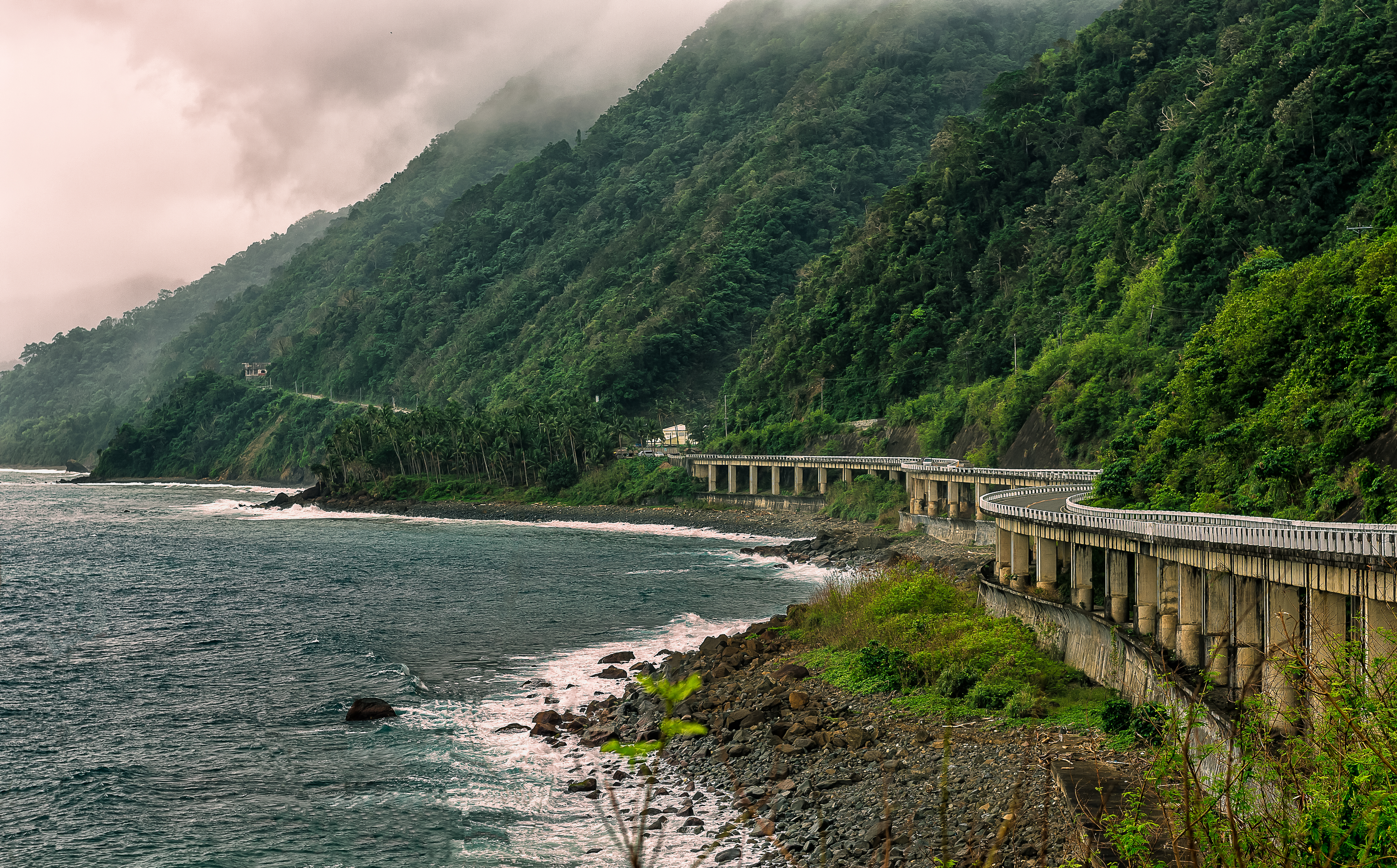
North Cordillera Mountain Range

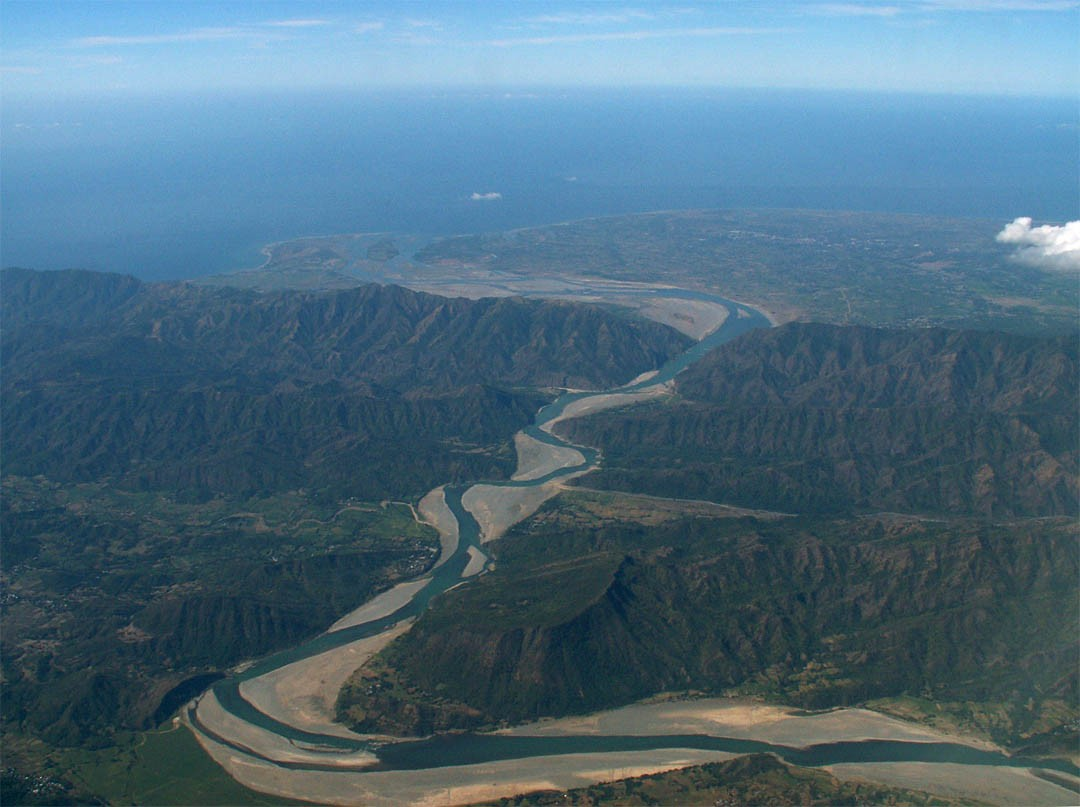
Abra River watershed

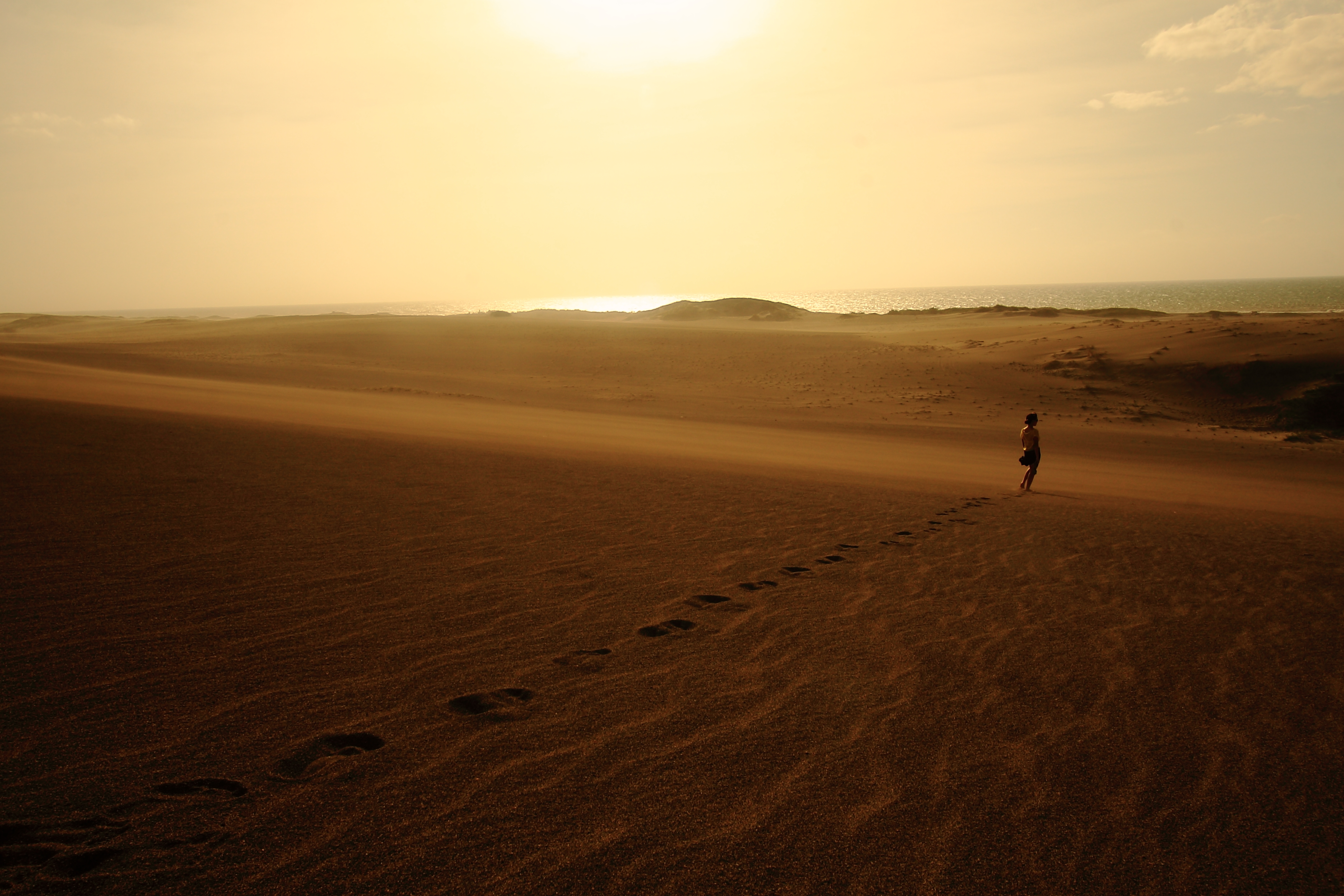
Paoay Sand Dunes

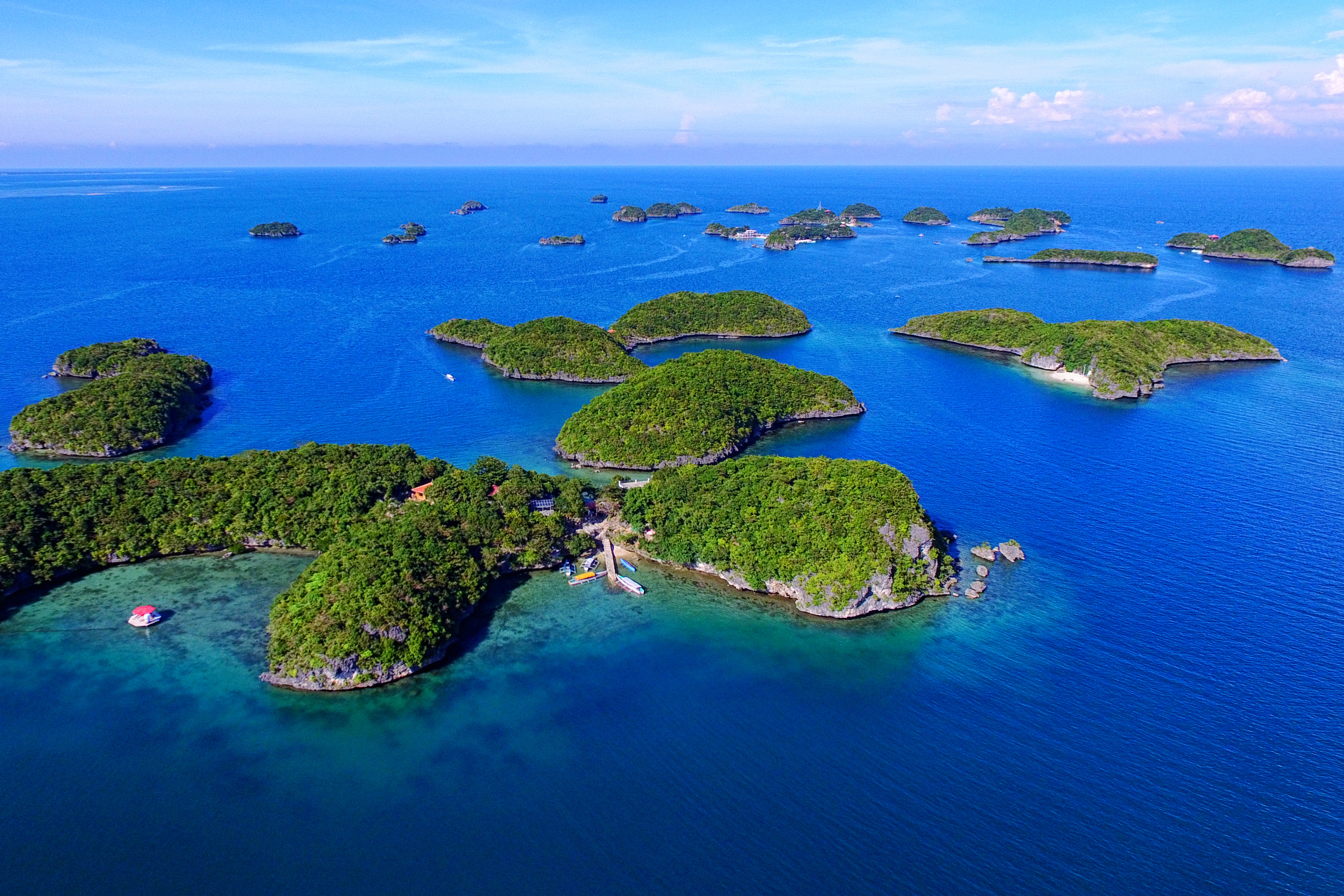
Hundred Islands National Park

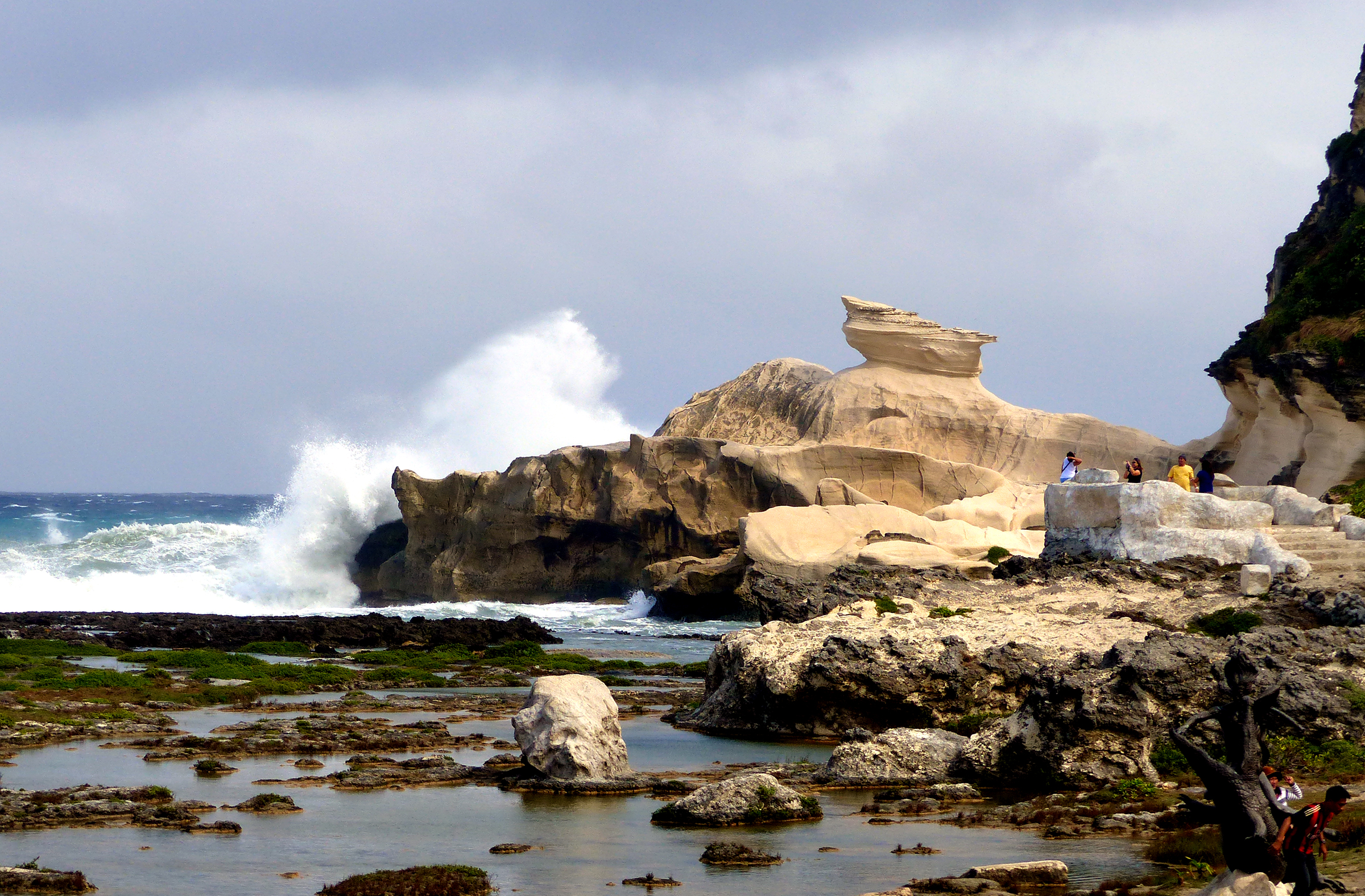
Kapurpurawan Rock Formation

The region's highest peak is Mount Sicapoo, located within the Central Cordillera range in Ilocos Norte and Abra. This mountain, characterized by dense pine forests, reaches an elevation of 7,746 feet (2,361 meters) above sea level, making it the tallest point in region.

The Ilocos Region is traversed by 29 river systems, including two significant river basins: the Agno River Basin and the Abra River Basin. The Agno River, originating in Benguet, flows through Pangasinan and forms a broad delta in Lingayen before emptying into Lingayen Gulf. It is one of the largest river systems in the Philippines, with a drainage area of 5,952 square kilometers (2,298 square miles). The Abra River, originating near Mount Data in Benguet, flows through Abra and Ilocos Sur and is the country's seventh-largest river system, with a drainage area of approximately 5,125 square kilometers (1,979 square miles) and a length of 179 kilometers (111 miles). The river's delta and mouth are located between the municipalities of Santa and Caoayan in Ilocos Sur, before emptying into the South China Sea.

The Lingayen Gulf, a notable body of water in the region, is particularly significant in Pangasinan and La Union. It hosts numerous islands, including the famed Hundred Islands National Park. To the north of the region lies the Luzon Strait, underscoring its strategic geographic importance.

Cabarruyan Island is the largest island in the region. It is situated in the municipality of Anda, Pangasinan, along the Lingayen Gulf. The island has an approximate area of 77.78 square kilometers (30.03 square miles) and a coastline length of roughly 59.16 kilometers (36.76 miles).

Paoay Lake is one of the largest natural lakes in the region, located at Paoay, Ilocos Norte, It has a surface area of approximately 3.86 square kilometers (1.49 square miles), with an average depth of 6 meters (20 feet) a maximum depth of 10 meters (33 feet) with surface elevation is below sea level.

Aw-asen Falls, at Sigay, Ilocos Sur, is the tallest waterfall in the region. It stands at a height of 120 meters (394 feet) and has a plunge pool depth of approximately 8 meters (26 feet).

Given its location, the Ilocos Region plays a pivotal role in East Asia, being in close proximity to dynamic economies such as Taiwan, South Korea, Japan, and Southern China.

=== Administrative Divisions ===
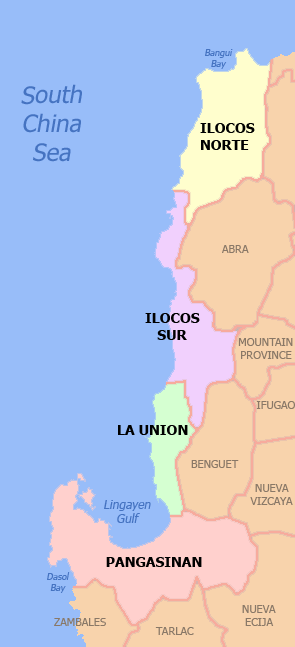
Political Map of the Ilocos Region

The Ilocos Region (Region I) is composed of four provinces, namely Ilocos Norte, Ilocos Sur, La Union, and Pangasinan. It also includes one independent component city (Dagupan City) and eight component cities: Laoag, Candon, Vigan, San Fernando, Alaminos, Urdaneta, San Carlos, and Batac. The region is further subdivided into 116 municipalities and 3,265 barangays. There are 12 congressional districts: 2 each in Ilocos Norte, Ilocos Sur, and La Union, and 6 in Pangasinan. These political divisions reflect the administrative organization of the region, facilitating governance and development initiatives.

==== Provinces ====
Province	Capital	Population (2020)		Area		Density		Cities	Muni.	Barangay
				km^{2}	sq mi	/km^{2}	/sq mi			
Ilocos Norte	Laoag City	11.5%	609,588	3,418.75	1,319.99	180	470	2	21	559
Ilocos Sur	Vigan City	13.3%	706,009	2,596.00	1,002.32	270	700	2	32	768
La Union	San Fernando City	15.5%	822,352	1,499.28	578.88	550	1,400	1	19	576
Pangasinan	Lingayen	59.7%	3,163,190	5,450.59	2,104.48	580	1,500	4	44	1,364
Total			5,301,139	12,964.62	5,005.67	410	1,100	9	116	3,267
• Figures for Pangasinan include the independent component city of Dagupan.

===== Governors and Vice Governors =====
Province	Image	Governor	Political Party	Vice Governor
Ilocos Norte		Cecilia Araneta Marcos	Nacionalista	Matthew Joseph Marcos Manotoc
Ilocos Sur		Jeremias C. Singson	Bileg	Ryan Luis Singson
La Union		Mario Eduardo C. Ortega	PFP	Eric O. Sibuma
Pangasinan		Ramon Guico III	Nacionalista	Mark Ronald DG. Lambino

==== Cities and Municipalities ====
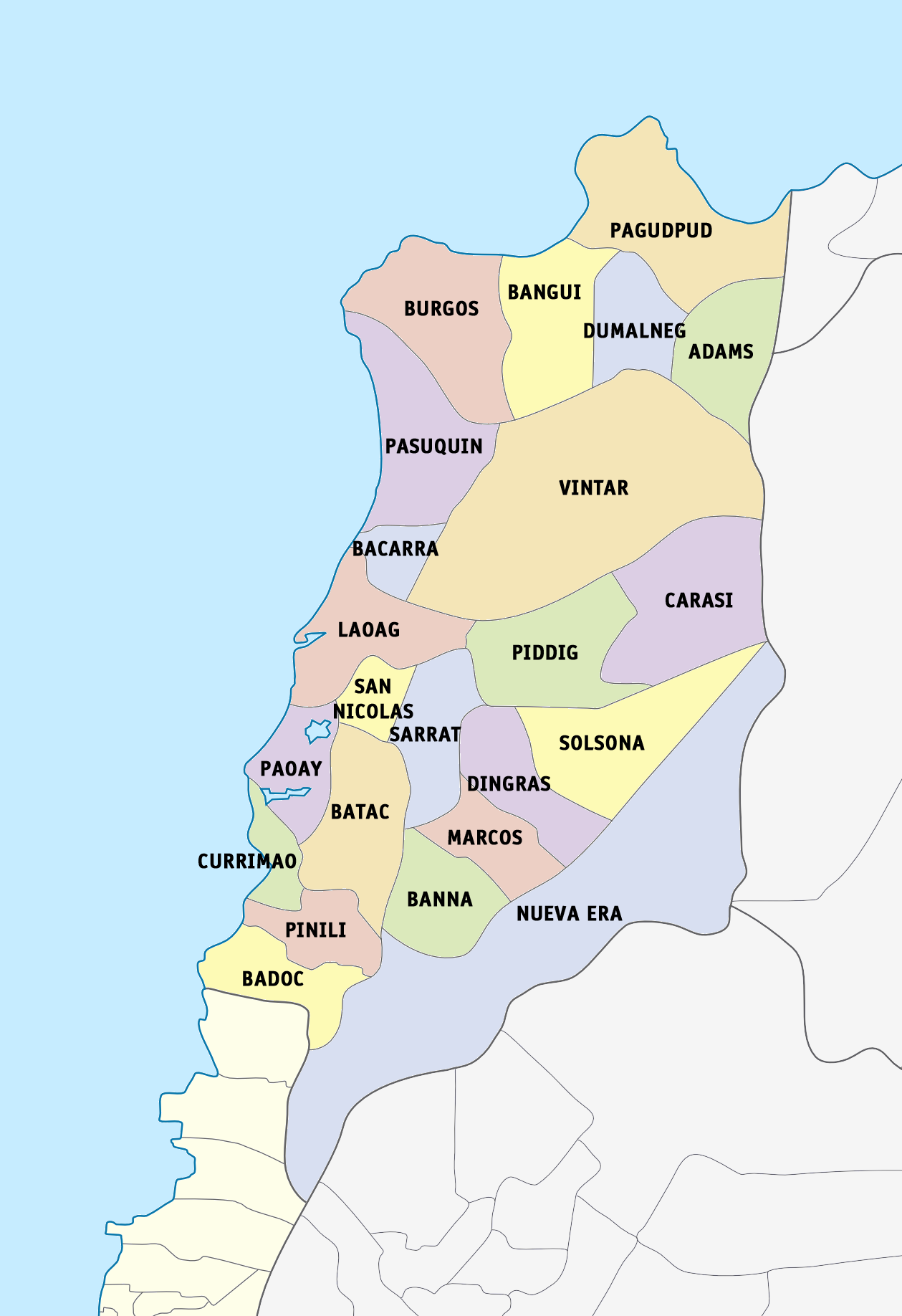
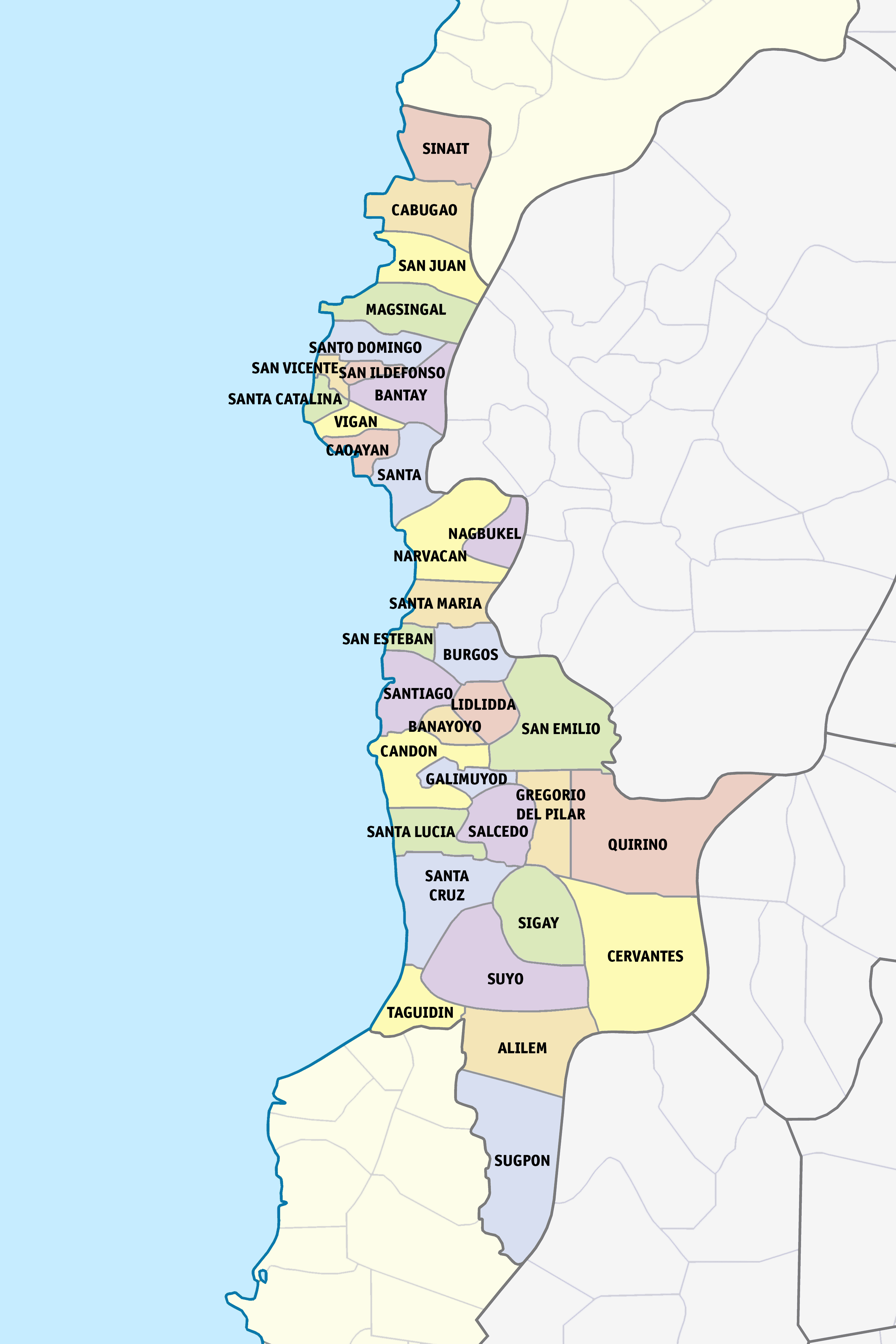
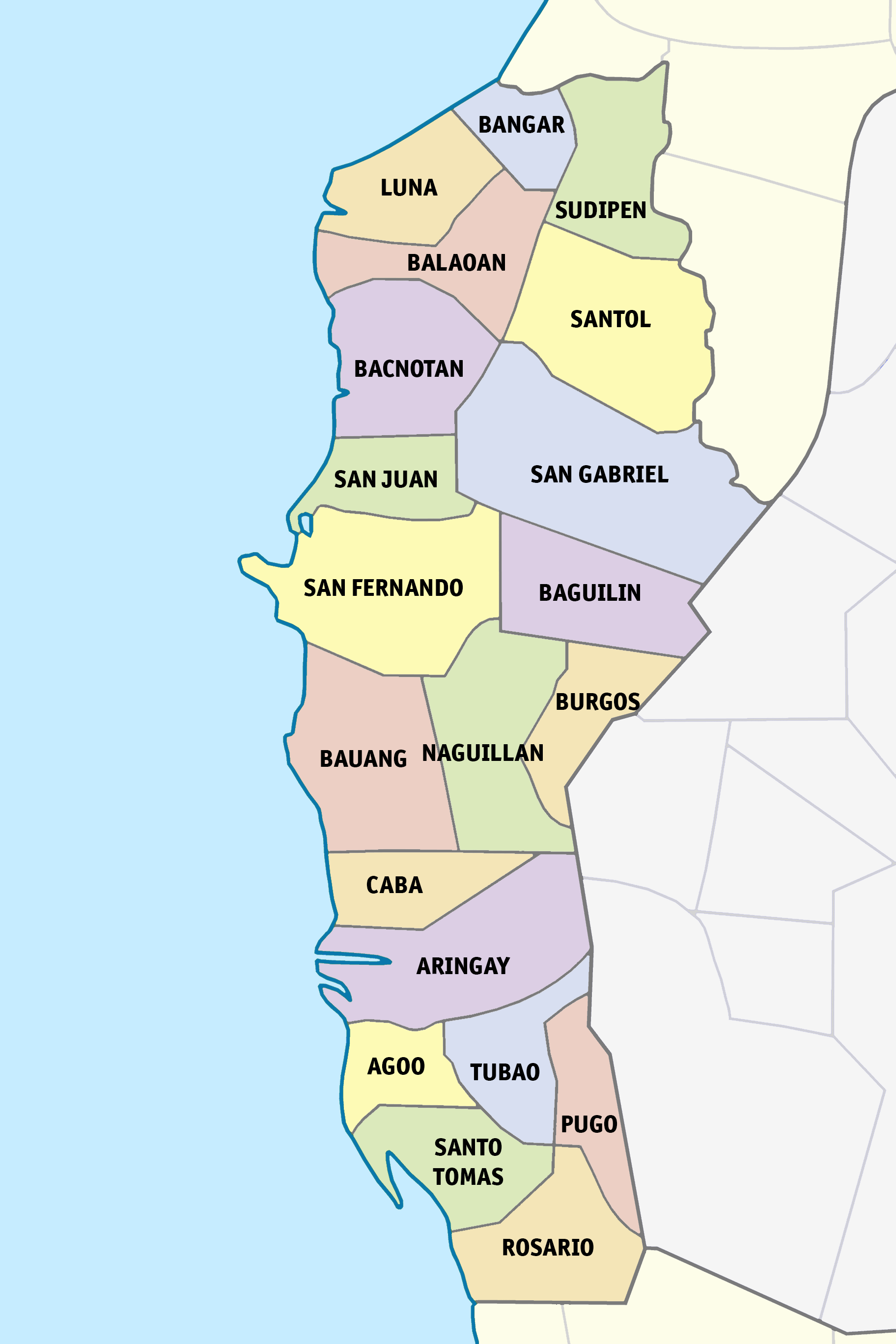
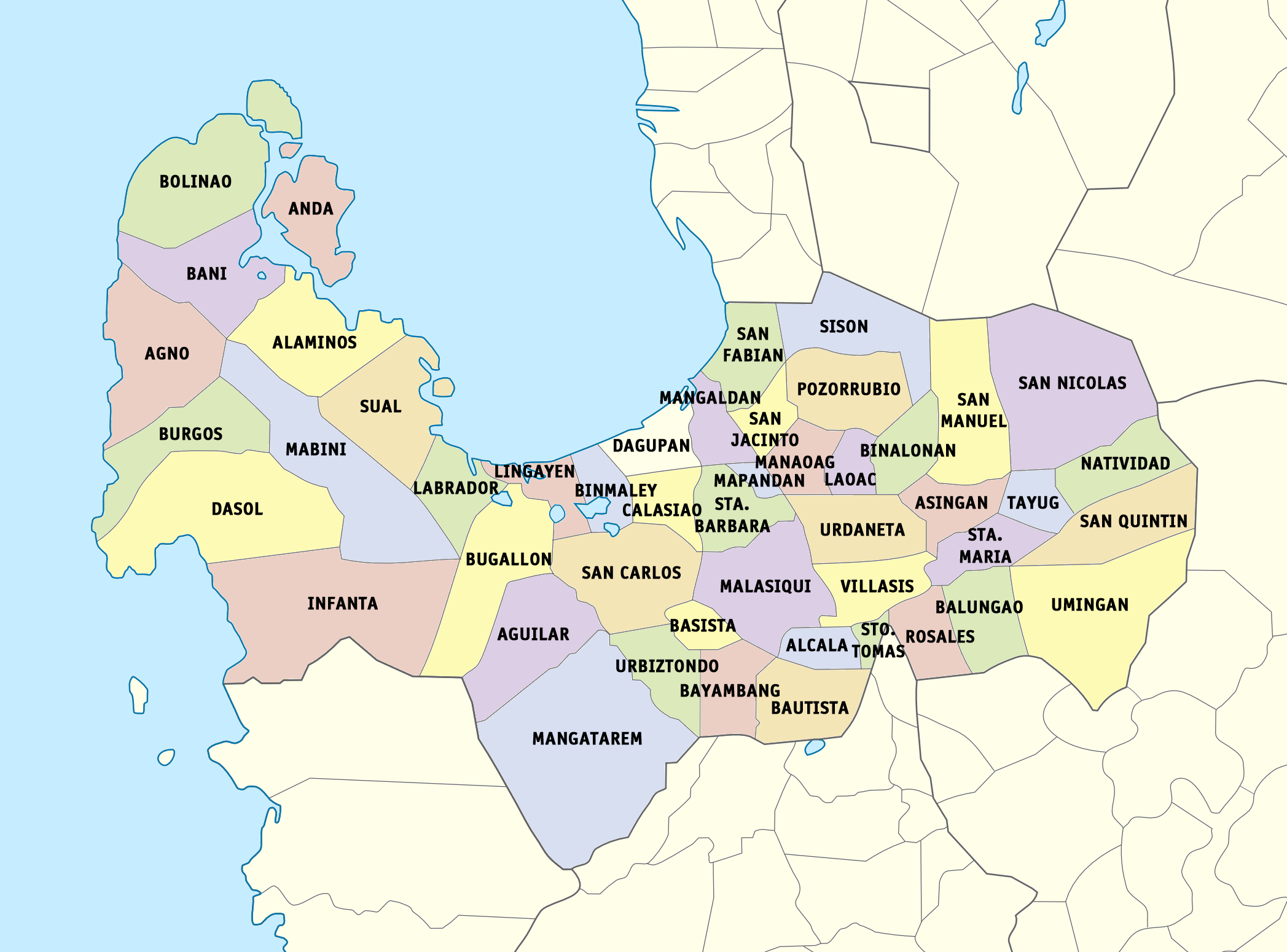
Political map of the provinces of the Ilocos Region showing their municipalities and cities
- † Regional center
- ^ Independent City

City/Municipality	Population (2020)	Area		Density		Class	Income class	Province
		km^{2}	sq mi	/km^{2}	/sq mi			
Adams	2,189	159.31	61.51	14	36	Municipality	5th	Ilocos Norte
Agno	29,947	169.75	65.54	180	470	Municipality	3rd	Pangasinan
Agoo	66,028	52.84	20.40	1,200	3,100	Municipality	1st	La Union
Aguilar	45,100	195.07	75.32	230	600	Municipality	3rd	Pangasinan
Alaminos	99,397	164.26	63.42	610	1,600	Component city	4th	Pangasinan
Alcala	48,908	45.71	17.65	1,100	2,800	Municipality	3rd	Pangasinan
Alilem	7,361	119.33	46.07	62	160	Municipality	4th	Ilocos Sur
Anda	41,548	74.55	28.78	560	1,500	Municipality	3rd	Pangasinan
Aringay	50,380	84.54	32.64	600	1,600	Municipality	2nd	La Union
Asingan	57,811	66.64	25.73	870	2,300	Municipality	2nd	Pangasinan
Bacarra	33,496	65.32	25.22	510	1,300	Municipality	3rd	Ilocos Norte
Bacnotan	44,388	76.60	29.58	580	1,500	Municipality	1st	La Union
Badoc	32,530	76.68	29.61	420	1,100	Municipality	2nd	Ilocos Norte
Bagulin	14,428	107.33	41.44	130	340	Municipality	5th	La Union
Balaoan	40,339	68.70	26.53	590	1,500	Municipality	1st	La Union
Balungao	30,004	73.25	28.28	410	1,100	Municipality	4th	Pangasinan
Banayoyo	7,931	24.63	9.51	320	830	Municipality	4th	Ilocos Sur
Bangar	38,041	37.36	14.42	1,000	2,600	Municipality	3rd	La Union
Bangui	15,019	112.98	43.62	130	340	Municipality	4th	Ilocos Norte
Bani	52,603	179.65	69.36	290	750	Municipality	2nd	Pangasinan
Banna	19,297	92.73	35.80	210	540	Municipality	4th	Ilocos Norte
Bantay	37,118	76.60	29.58	480	1,200	Municipality	1st	Ilocos Sur
Basista	37,679	24.00	9.27	1,600	4,100	Municipality	4th	Pangasinan
Batac	55,484	161.06	62.19	340	880	Component city	5th	Ilocos Norte
Bauang	78,449	73.15	28.24	1,100	2,800	Municipality	1st	La Union
Bautista	35,398	46.33	17.89	760	2,000	Municipality	4th	Pangasinan
Bayambang	129,011	143.94	55.58	900	2,300	Municipality	1st	Pangasinan
Binalonan	56,382	47.57	18.37	1,200	3,100	Municipality	1st	Pangasinan
Binmaley	86,881	118.50	45.75	730	1,900	Municipality	1st	Pangasinan
Bolinao	83,979	197.22	76.15	430	1,100	Municipality	1st	Pangasinan
Bugallon	74,962	189.64	73.22	400	1,000	Municipality	2nd	Pangasinan
Burgos	10,759	128.90	49.77	83	210	Municipality	5th	Ilocos Norte
Burgos	12,793	44.38	17.14	290	750	Municipality	4th	Ilocos Sur
Burgos	9,006	70.80	27.34	130	340	Municipality	5th	La Union
Burgos	23,749	131.32	50.70	180	470	Municipality	4th	Pangasinan
Caba	23,119	46.31	17.88	500	1,300	Municipality	4th	La Union
Cabugao	38,884	95.56	36.90	410	1,100	Municipality	1st	Ilocos Sur
Calasiao	100,471	48.36	18.67	2,100	5,400	Municipality	1st	Pangasinan
Candon	61,432	103.28	39.88	590	1,500	Component city	4th	Ilocos Sur
Caoayan	19,574	17.42	6.73	1,100	2,800	Municipality	4th	Ilocos Sur
Carasi	1,607	82.97	32.03	19	49	Municipality	5th	Ilocos Norte
Cervantes	19,449	234.70	90.62	83	210	Municipality	4th	Ilocos Sur
Currimao	12,215	34.08	13.16	360	930	Municipality	4th	Ilocos Norte
^Dagupan	174,302	44.47	17.17	3,900	10,000	Independent component city	2nd	Pangasinan
Dasol	31,355	166.60	64.32	190	490	Municipality	3rd	Pangasinan
Dingras	40,127	96.00	37.07	420	1,100	Municipality	2nd	Ilocos Norte
Dumalneg	3,087	88.48	34.16	35	91	Municipality	5th	Ilocos Norte
Galimuyod	10,244	34.40	13.28	300	780	Municipality	4th	Ilocos Sur
Gregorio del Pilar	4,472	41.66	16.09	110	280	Municipality	5th	Ilocos Sur
Infanta	26,242	254.29	98.18	100	260	Municipality	3rd	Pangasinan
Labrador	26,811	90.99	35.13	290	750	Municipality	4th	Pangasinan
Laoac	34,128	40.50	15.64	840	2,200	Municipality	4th	Pangasinan
Laoag	111,651	116.08	44.82	960	2,500	Component city	3rd	Ilocos Norte
Lidlidda	4,705	33.84	13.07	140	360	Municipality	5th	Ilocos Sur
Lingayen	107,728	62.76	24.23	1,700	4,400	Municipality	1st	Pangasinan
Luna	37,318	42.90	16.56	870	2,300	Municipality	3rd	La Union
Mabini	26,454	291.01	112.36	91	240	Municipality	3rd	Pangasinan
Magsingal	31,308	84.98	32.81	370	960	Municipality	3rd	Ilocos Sur
Malasiqui	143,094	131.37	50.72	1,100	2,800	Municipality	1st	Pangasinan
Manaoag	76,045	55.95	21.60	1,400	3,600	Municipality	1st	Pangasinan
Mangaldan	113,185	48.47	18.71	2,300	6,000	Municipality	1st	Pangasinan
Mangatarem	79,323	317.50	122.59	250	650	Municipality	1st	Pangasinan
Mapandan	38,058	30.00	11.58	1,300	3,400	Municipality	3rd	Pangasinan
Marcos	18,010	72.77	28.10	250	650	Municipality	4th	Ilocos Norte
Nagbukel	5,465	43.12	16.65	130	340	Municipality	5th	Ilocos Sur
Naguilian	52,189	104.60	40.39	500	1,300	Municipality	1st	La Union
Narvacan	46,234	122.21	47.19	380	980	Municipality	2nd	Ilocos Sur
Natividad	25,771	134.36	51.88	190	490	Municipality	4th	Pangasinan
Nueva Era	11,968	515.02	198.85	23	60	Municipality	3rd	Ilocos Norte
Pagudpud	25,098	194.90	75.25	130	340	Municipality	4th	Ilocos Norte
Paoay	25,001	76.24	29.44	330	850	Municipality	4th	Ilocos Norte
Pasuquin	29,678	210.54	81.29	140	360	Municipality	3rd	Ilocos Norte
Piddig	22,475	216.20	83.48	100	260	Municipality	3rd	Ilocos Norte
Pinili	17,626	89.48	34.55	200	520	Municipality	4th	Ilocos Norte
Pozorrubio	74,729	134.60	51.97	560	1,500	Municipality	1st	Pangasinan
Pugo	19,337	62.84	24.26	310	800	Municipality	5th	La Union
Quirino	9,306	240.10	92.70	39	100	Municipality	4th	Ilocos Sur
Rosales	66,711	66.39	25.63	1,000	2,600	Municipality	1st	Pangasinan
Rosario	60,278	73.98	28.56	810	2,100	Municipality	1st	La Union
Salcedo	11,110	103.44	39.94	110	280	Municipality	4th	Ilocos Sur
San Carlos	205,424	169.03	65.26	1,200	3,100	Component city	3rd	Pangasinan
San Emilio	7,206	141.44	54.61	51	130	Municipality	4th	Ilocos Sur
San Esteban	8,381	19.62	7.58	430	1,100	Municipality	5th	Ilocos Sur
San Fabian	87,428	81.28	31.38	1,100	2,800	Municipality	1st	Pangasinan
† San Fernando	125,640	102.72	39.66	1,200	3,100	Component city	3rd	La Union
San Gabriel	18,943	129.87	50.14	150	390	Municipality	4th	La Union
San Ildefonso	8,190	11.35	4.38	720	1,900	Municipality	5th	Ilocos Sur
San Jacinto	44,351	44.18	17.06	1,000	2,600	Municipality	3rd	Pangasinan
San Juan	26,674	64.37	24.85	410	1,100	Municipality	3rd	Ilocos Sur
San Juan	40,507	57.12	22.05	710	1,800	Municipality	2nd	La Union
San Manuel	54,271	129.18	49.88	420	1,100	Municipality	1st	Pangasinan
San Nicolas	38,895	40.18	15.51	970	2,500	Municipality	2nd	Ilocos Norte
San Nicolas	39,778	210.20	81.16	190	490	Municipality	1st	Pangasinan
San Quintin	33,980	115.90	44.75	290	750	Municipality	3rd	Pangasinan
San Vicente	13,118	12.60	4.86	1,000	2,600	Municipality	5th	Ilocos Sur
Santa	14,992	109.10	42.12	140	360	Municipality	4th	Ilocos Sur
Santa Barbara	92,187	61.37	23.70	1,500	3,900	Municipality	1st	Pangasinan
Santa Catalina	14,493	9.68	3.74	1,500	3,900	Municipality	5th	Ilocos Sur
Santa Cruz	41,366	88.78	34.28	470	1,200	Municipality	1st	Ilocos Sur
Santa Lucia	25,966	49.72	19.20	520	1,300	Municipality	3rd	Ilocos Sur
Santa Maria	30,006	63.31	24.44	470	1,200	Municipality	3rd	Ilocos Sur
Santa Maria	34,220	69.50	26.83	490	1,300	Municipality	4th	Pangasinan
Santiago	19,471	46.36	17.90	420	1,100	Municipality	4th	Ilocos Sur
Santo Domingo	29,041	55.49	21.42	520	1,300	Municipality	3rd	Ilocos Sur
Santo Tomas	40,846	64.00	24.71	640	1,700	Municipality	4th	La Union
Santo Tomas	14,878	12.99	5.02	1,100	2,800	Municipality	5th	Pangasinan
Santol	14,166	93.70	36.18	150	390	Municipality	4th	La Union
Sarrat	25,186	57.39	22.16	440	1,100	Municipality	1st	Ilocos Norte
Sigay	2,552	81.55	31.49	31	80	Municipality	5th	Ilocos Sur
Sinait	25,998	65.56	25.31	400	1,000	Municipality	3rd	Ilocos Sur
Sison	52,320	81.88	31.61	640	1,700	Municipality	3rd	Pangasinan
Solsona	24,851	166.23	64.18	150	390	Municipality	3rd	Ilocos Norte
Sual	39,091	130.16	50.26	300	780	Municipality	1st	Pangasinan
Sudipen	17,187	97.59	37.68	180	470	Municipality	4th	La Union
Sugpon	4,930	57.11	22.05	86	220	Municipality	5th	Ilocos Sur
Suyo	10,766	124.00	47.88	87	230	Municipality	4th	Ilocos Sur
Tagudin	41,538	151.19	58.37	270	700	Municipality	2nd	Ilocos Sur
Tayug	45,241	51.24	19.78	880	2,300	Municipality	3rd	Pangasinan
Tubao	31,763	50.75	19.59	630	1,600	Municipality	4th	La Union
Umingan	77,074	258.43	99.78	300	780	Municipality	1st	Pangasinan
Urbiztondo	55,557	81.80	31.58	680	1,800	Municipality	3rd	Pangasinan
Urdaneta	144,577	100.26	38.71	1,400	3,600	Component city	2nd	Pangasinan
Vigan	53,935	25.12	9.70	2,100	5,400	Component city	4th	Ilocos Sur
Villasis	65,047	75.83	29.28	860	2,200	Municipality	1st	Pangasinan
Vintar	33,339	614.35	237.20	54	140	Municipality	1st	Ilocos Norte

== Economy ==
The economy of the Ilocos Region grew by 7.1% in 2023, reaching ₱701.5 billion from ₱654.8 billion in 2022, making it the third fastest-growing economy among the country's 17 regions. Contributing 0.2 percentage points to the Philippines' 5.5% economic growth, the region accounted for 3.3% of the national Gross Domestic Product (GDP). The Services sector led the regional growth with a contribution of 4.4 percentage points, followed by Industry at 2.1 percentage points, and Agriculture, Forestry, and Fishing at 0.6 percentage points.

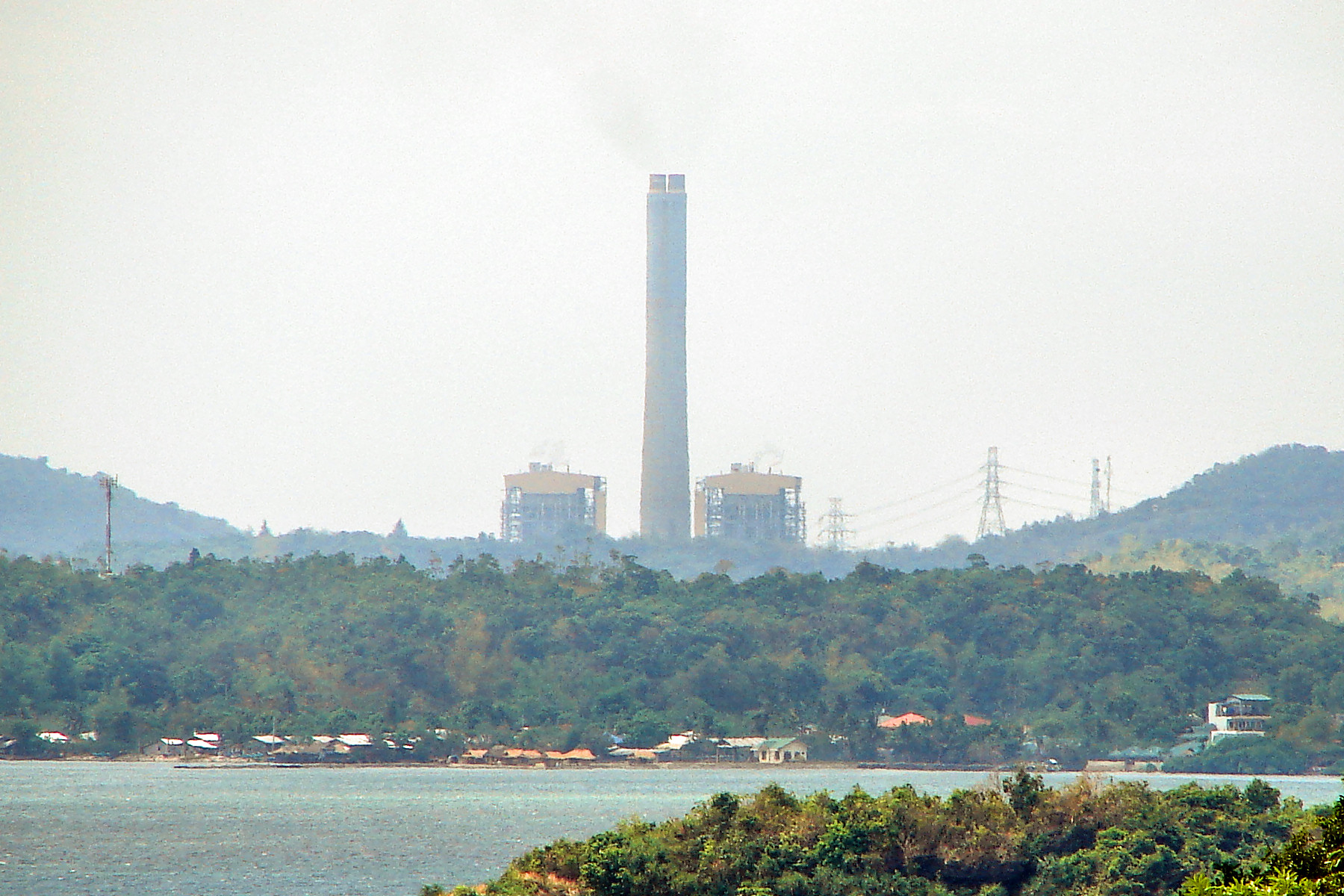
Sual Power Plant

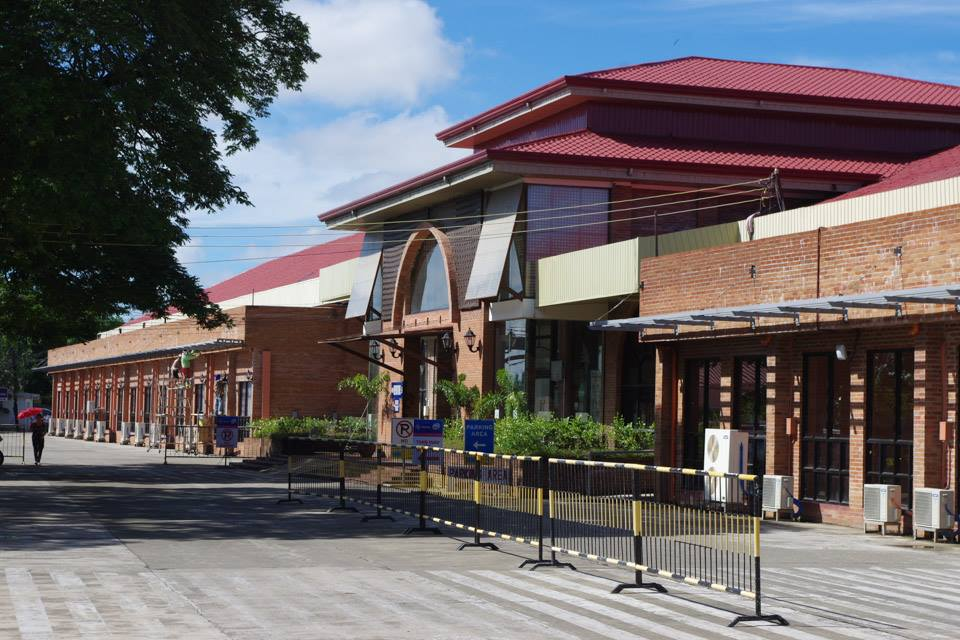
Laoag International Airport

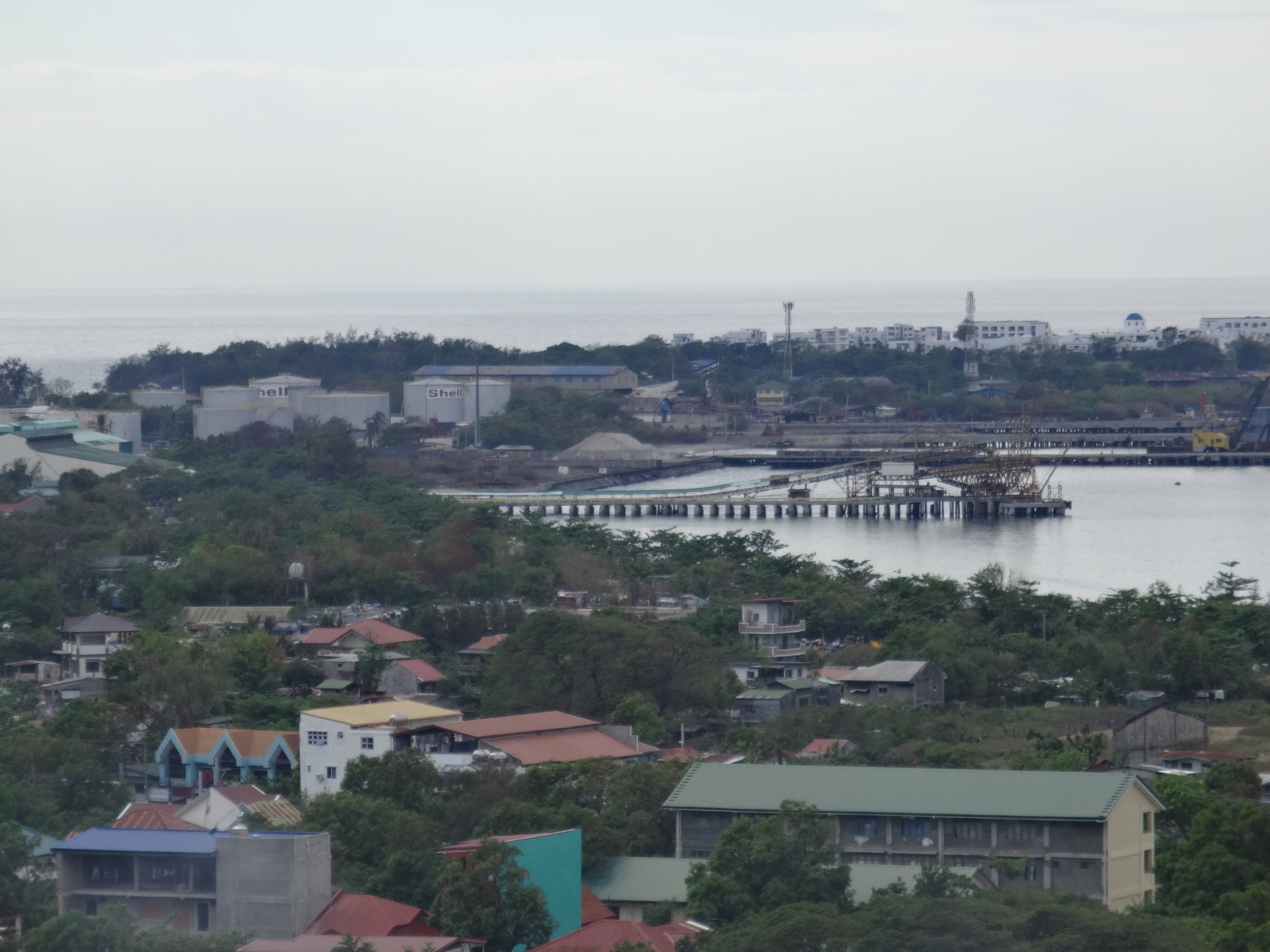
San Fernando Port

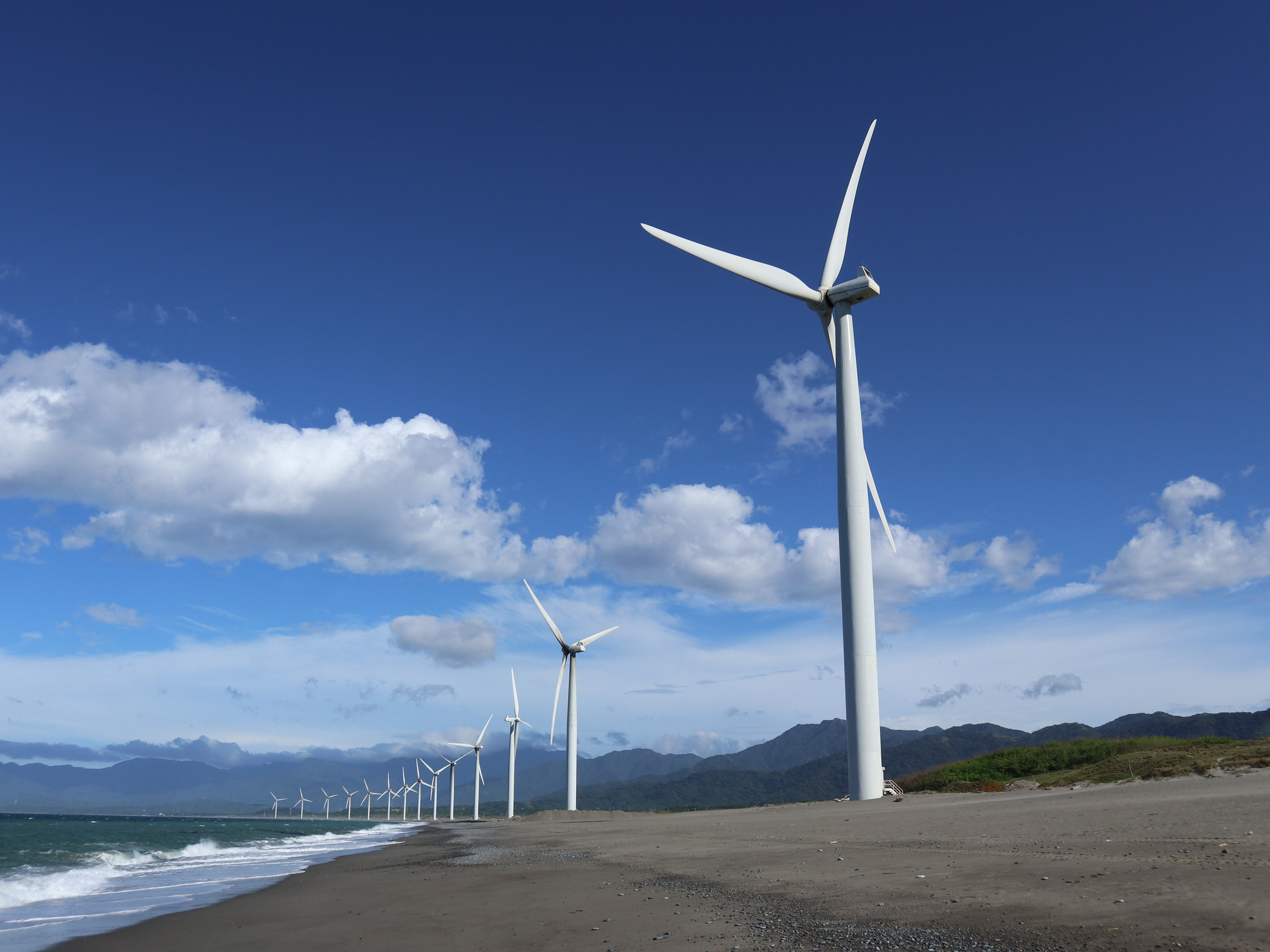
Bangui Wind Farm

In 2022, Pangasinan's GDP reached ₱352.93 billion, representing 53.9% of the Ilocos Region's Gross Regional Domestic Product (GRDP) and affirming its role as the region's economic driver. La Union followed with a contribution of ₱118.60 billion (18.1%), while Ilocos Norte and Ilocos Sur contributed ₱93.10 billion (14.2%) and ₱90.24 billion (13.8%), respectively.

Pangasinan ranked seventh among the 82 provinces in the Philippines in terms of GDP at ₱352.9 billion. Ilocos Norte recorded the fastest growth rate in the region in 2022 at 8.7%, followed by La Union at 7.7%, Pangasinan at 7.4%, and Ilocos Sur at 7.1%. Ilocos Norte had the highest per capita GDP in the region at ₱150.15 thousand, followed by La Union at ₱140.84 thousand and Ilocos Sur at ₱124.58 thousand, while Pangasinan recorded the lowest per capita GDP at ₱111.45 thousand.

Poverty incidence of Ilocos Region (%)

Source: Philippine Statistics Authority

In 2023, the poverty incidence among families in the Ilocos Region was recorded at 8.4%, with a Full Year Per Capita Poverty Threshold of ₱34,454. The Coefficient of Variation for the poverty incidence in the region was 9.8%, reflecting the statistical reliability of the estimate and indicating a significant improvement compared to previous years. Among the provinces in the region, Ilocos Norte recorded the lowest poverty incidence rate among families at 0.3% and among the population at 0.5%, the lowest in the provincial category nationwide for 2023. This was followed by Ilocos Sur with a poverty incidence among families of 5.2%, La Union at 6.3%, and Pangasinan at 11.4%.

=== Agriculture ===
The economy of the Ilocos Region is diverse, with distinct industries in the northern and southern areas. Pangasinan, located in the southern part of the region, is a major contributor to the economy of the Ilocos Region through aquaculture, agro-industrial ventures, and the service sector, which closely mirrors the economic activities of Central Luzon.

The province is well known for its extensive milkfish (bangus) farming, salt farming, livestock raising, and fish paste (bagoong) production. Aquaculture production in the region during the third quarter of 2023 reached 28.32 thousand metric tons, with Pangasinan accounting for 96.8% of the total, equivalent to 27.42 thousand metric tons. In addition to milkfish, tilapia is the second most-produced species in the region.

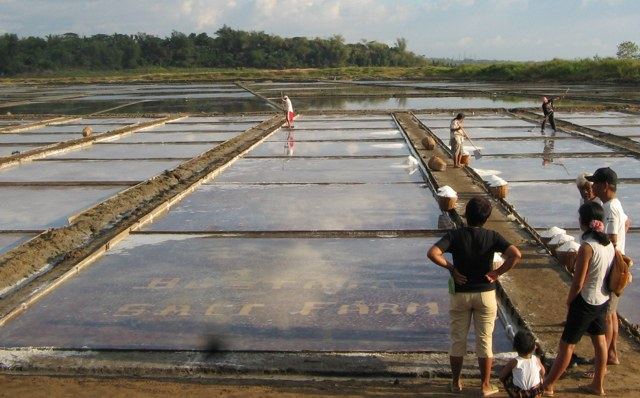
Salt Farm in Dasol, Pangasinan

Pangasinan is also notable for its significant salt production, with the town of Dasol recognized as the second-largest salt producer in the Philippines. In 2021, Dasol produced 24,000 metric tons of salt from its more than 10,000 salt beds, making it a vital contributor to the local and national salt supply.

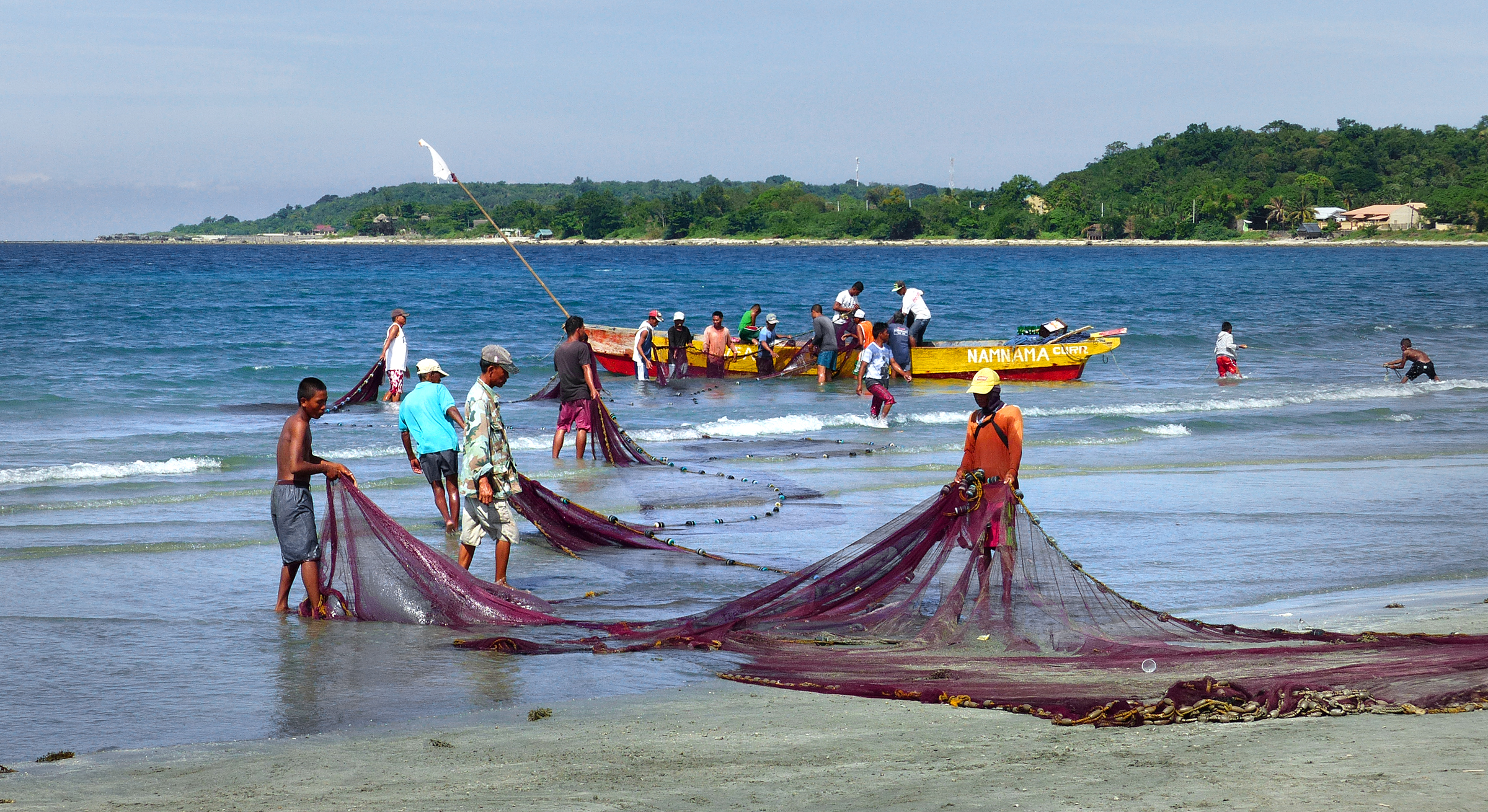
Fishermen pulling ashore their nets at Currimao, Ilocos Norte

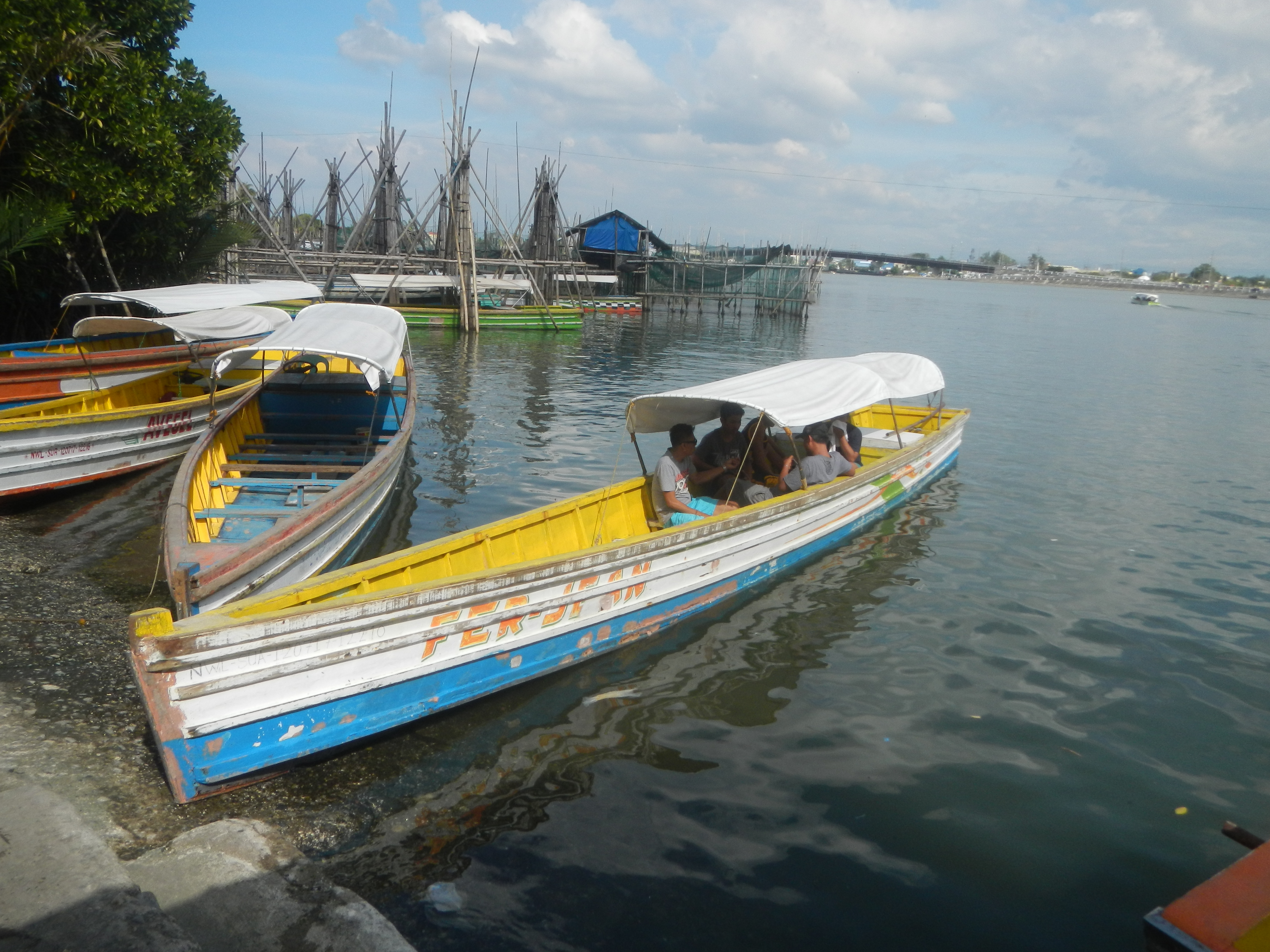
Fishponds situated along the Calmay River, Dagupan City

In the second quarter of 2023, the region's total fisheries production reached 46,846.41 metric tons, reflecting a 5.35% increase from the same period in 2022. This accounted for 4.33% of the national fisheries production, which totaled 1,082,215.17 metric tons, and positioned the region as the 7th largest producer in the country.

The region northern section focus primarily on agriculture, which is a major driver of the region's economy. These section produce rice, tobacco, garlic, corn, sugarcane, and various fruits and vegetables, making agriculture a cornerstone of their economic activities. In 2023, the Ilocos Region ranked fifth among the top rice-producing regions in the Philippines, with an average yield of 4.83 metric tons per hectare and a total production of 1.9 million metric tons from 418,000 hectares of farmland.

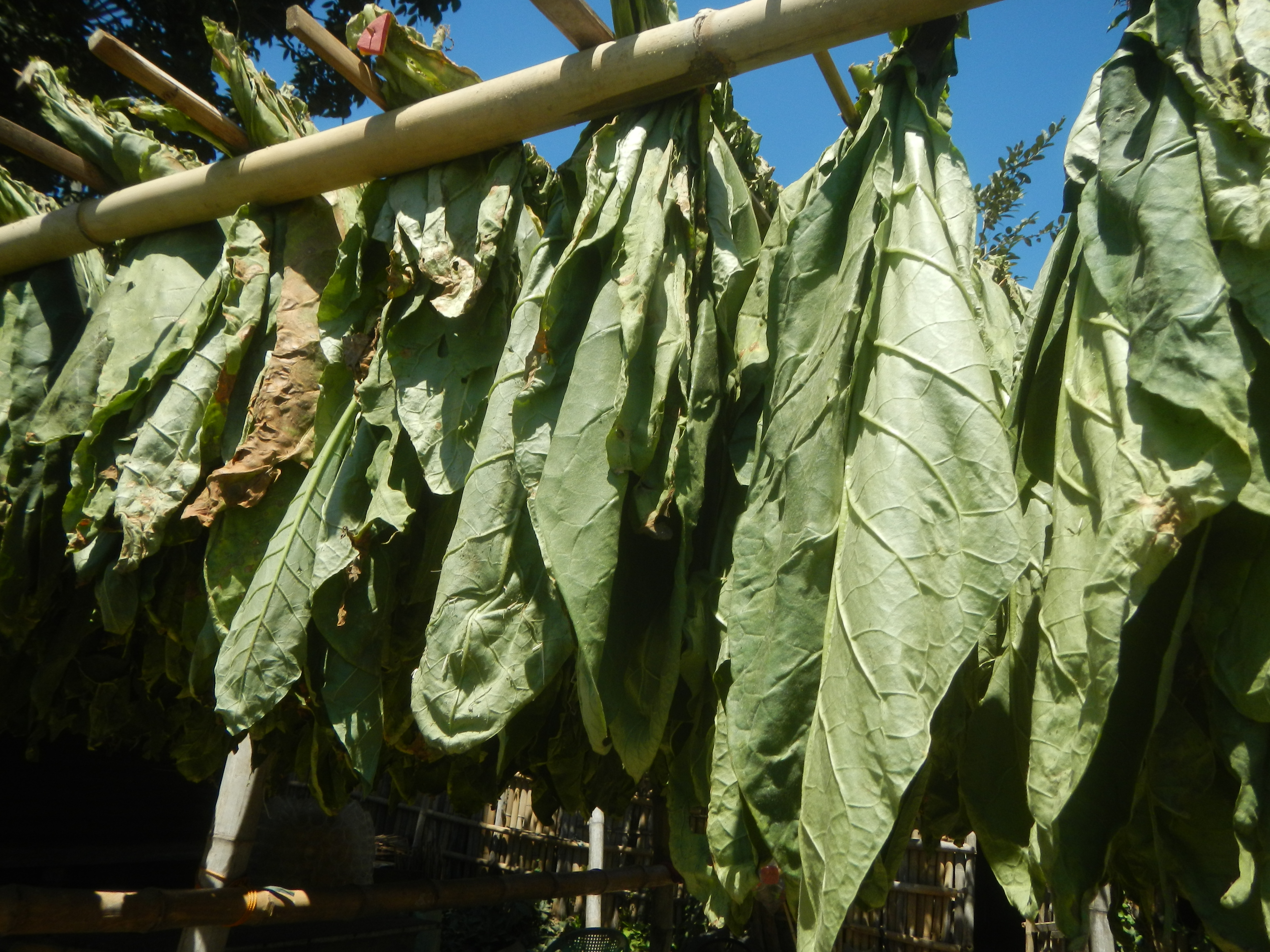
Air-curing of harvested tobacco leaves in Caba, La Union

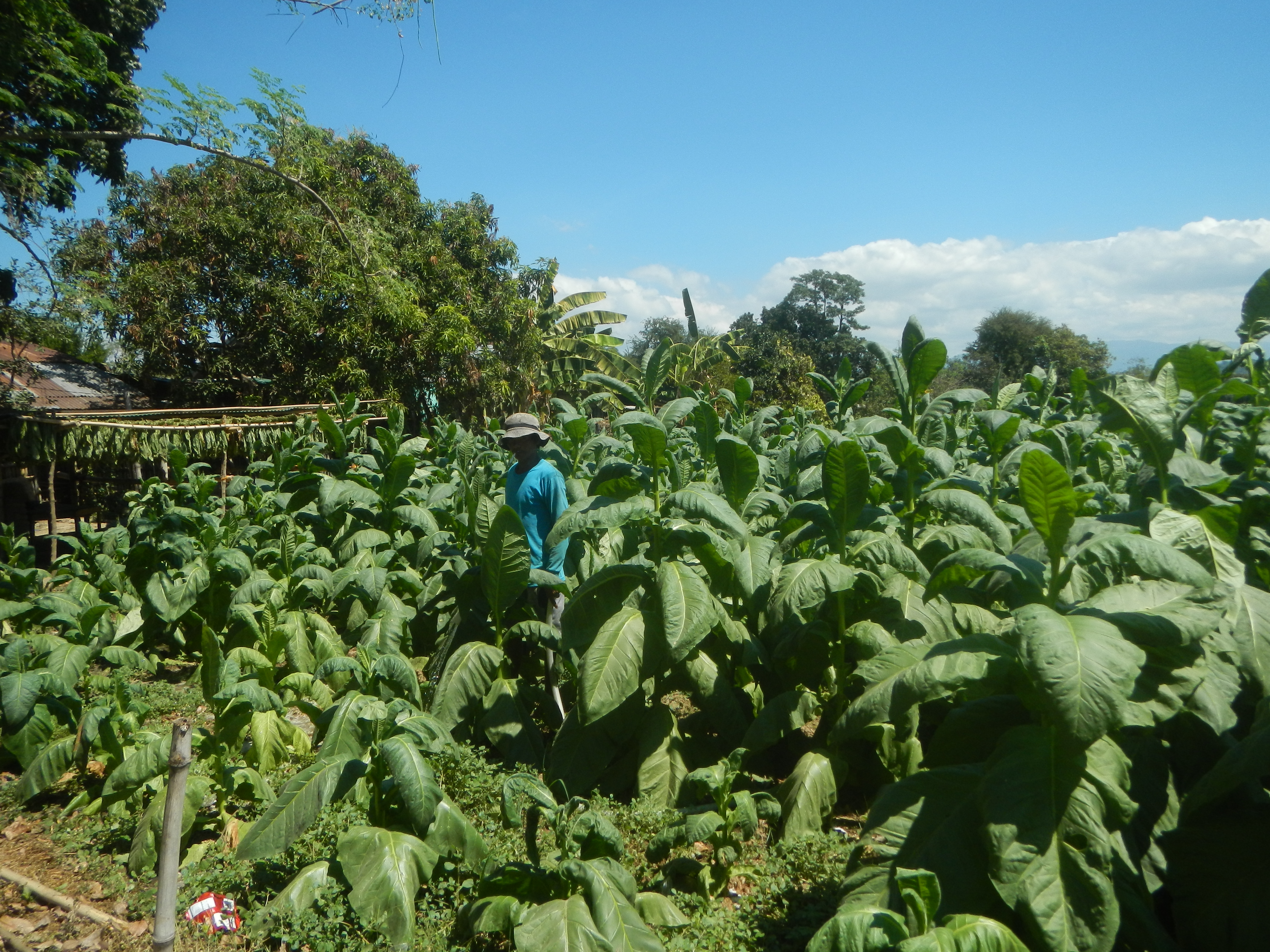
Tobacco field in La Union

The region is also the top leading producer of garlic and tobacco in the Philippines. In terms of garlic production, contributing 76.51% of the country's total output of 5,884.93 metric tons in 2022. Ilocos Norte accounted for the majority of this production at 97.20%, followed by Ilocos Sur with 2.80%. While in tobacco, recording 24.62 thousand metric tons in the second quarter of 2023, which accounted for 66.4% of the country's total output. Ilocos Sur was the top producer, followed by Pangasinan, La Union, and Ilocos Norte. Among tobacco varieties, Virginia tobacco was the most produced, followed by native tobacco.

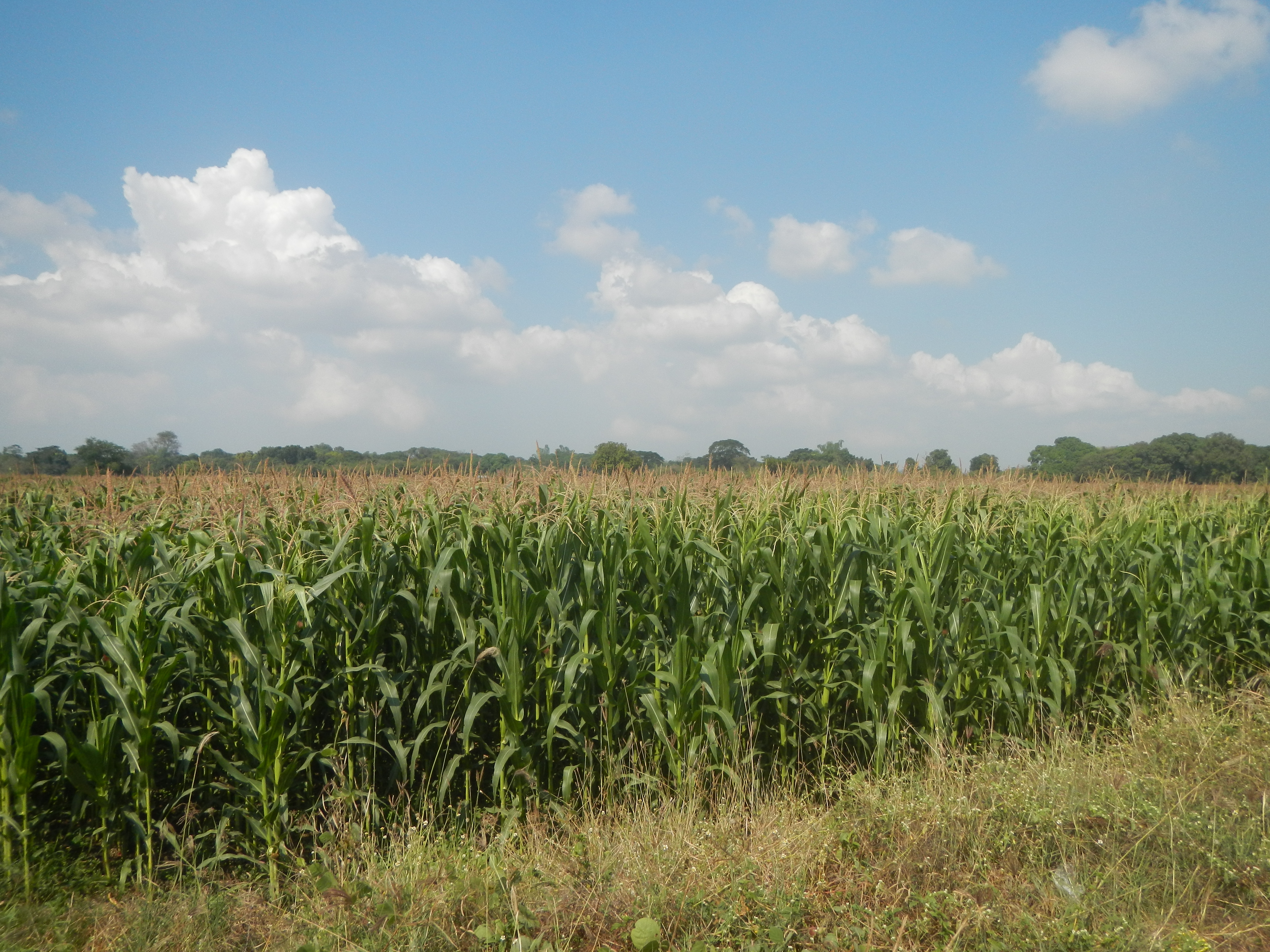
A vast cornfield in Laoac, Pangasinan

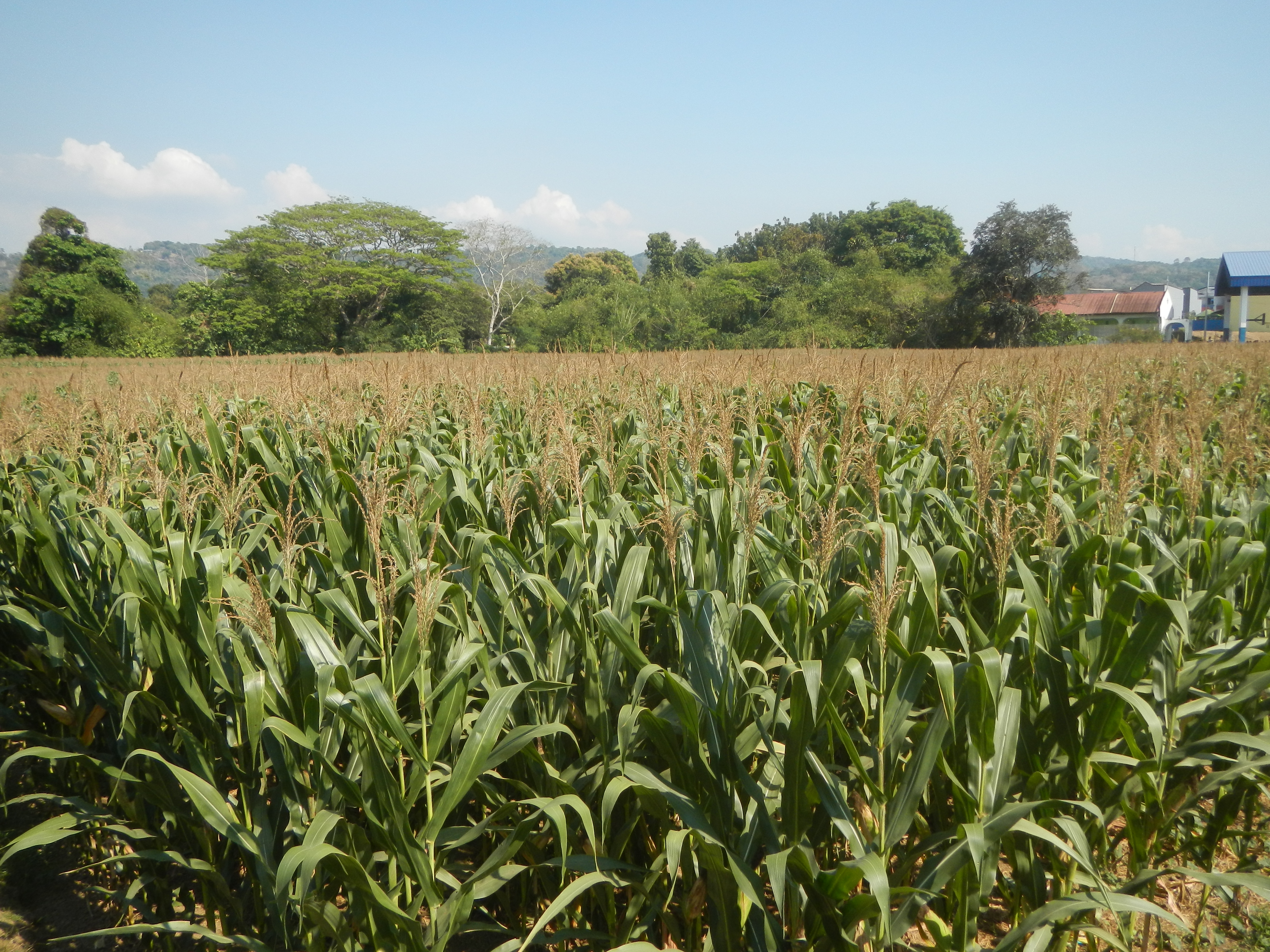
A cornfield in San Fernando City, La Union

The region also ranked fifth in corn production in 2022, contributing 7.10% to the country's total output. Pangasinan accounted for 62.56% of the region's corn production, followed by Ilocos Sur (19.53%), Ilocos Norte (11.32%), and La Union (6.59%). Yellow corn dominated the region's production, comprising 91.97% of the total output, while white corn accounted for 8.03%.

In 2021, the region's major fruit and vegetable productions included bananas (44,411.05 metric tons) banana saba being the highest, mangoes (172,469.08 metric tons) mango carabao as the top variety, papayas (3,573.36 metric tons), watermelons (28,782.39 metric tons), calamansi (3,508.58 metric tons), pineapples (206.66 metric tons), tomatoes (75,127.03 metric tons), onions (38,968.45 metric tons), sweet potatoes (15,512.72 metric tons), and string beans (12,543.09 metric tons). In 2022, ampalaya production reached 10,831.42 metric tons, ranking third nationwide. By 2023, the region produced 95,281 metric tons of eggplants.

In terms of livestock, the Ilocos Region ranked third among the cattle-producing regions in the Philippines in 2022, contributing 9.87% to the national production of 236,648.40 metric tons liveweight. Livestock farming, including pigs, chickens, goats, and carabaos (water buffalos), is another key economic activity in the region.

=== Industry ===
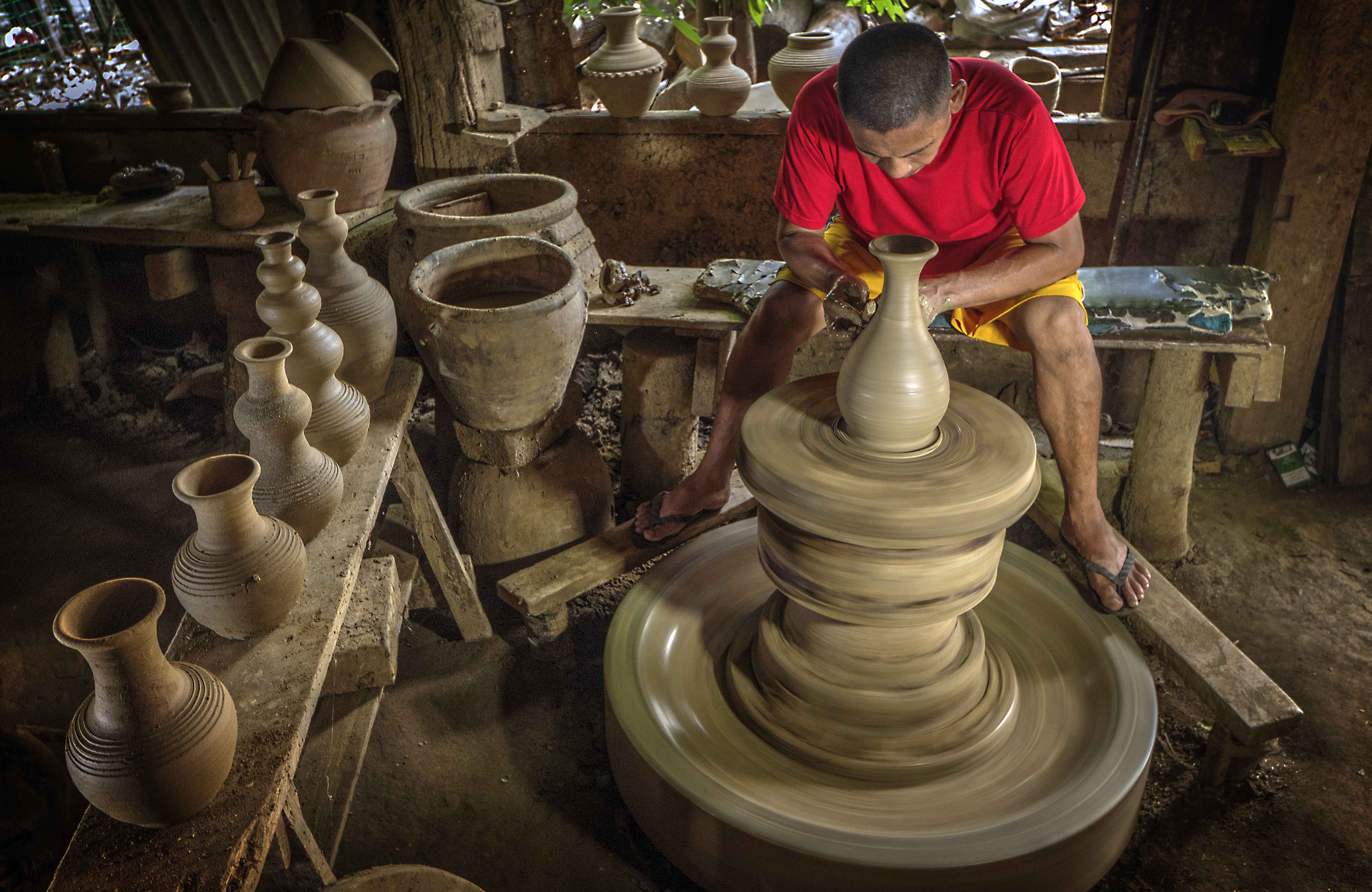
Burnayan or Damili pottery in Vigan, Ilocos Sur

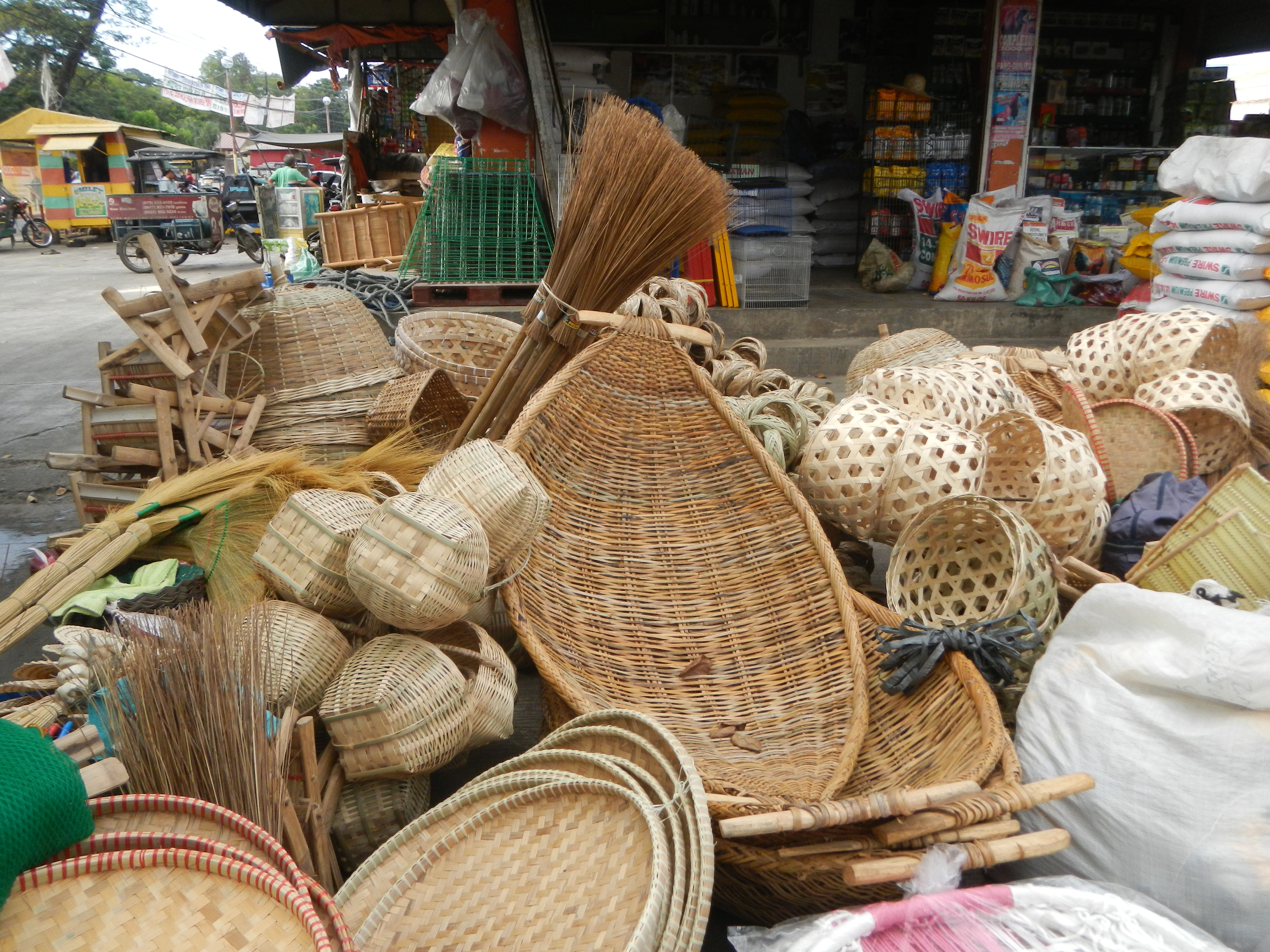
Rattan basketry products in San Carlos, Pangasinan

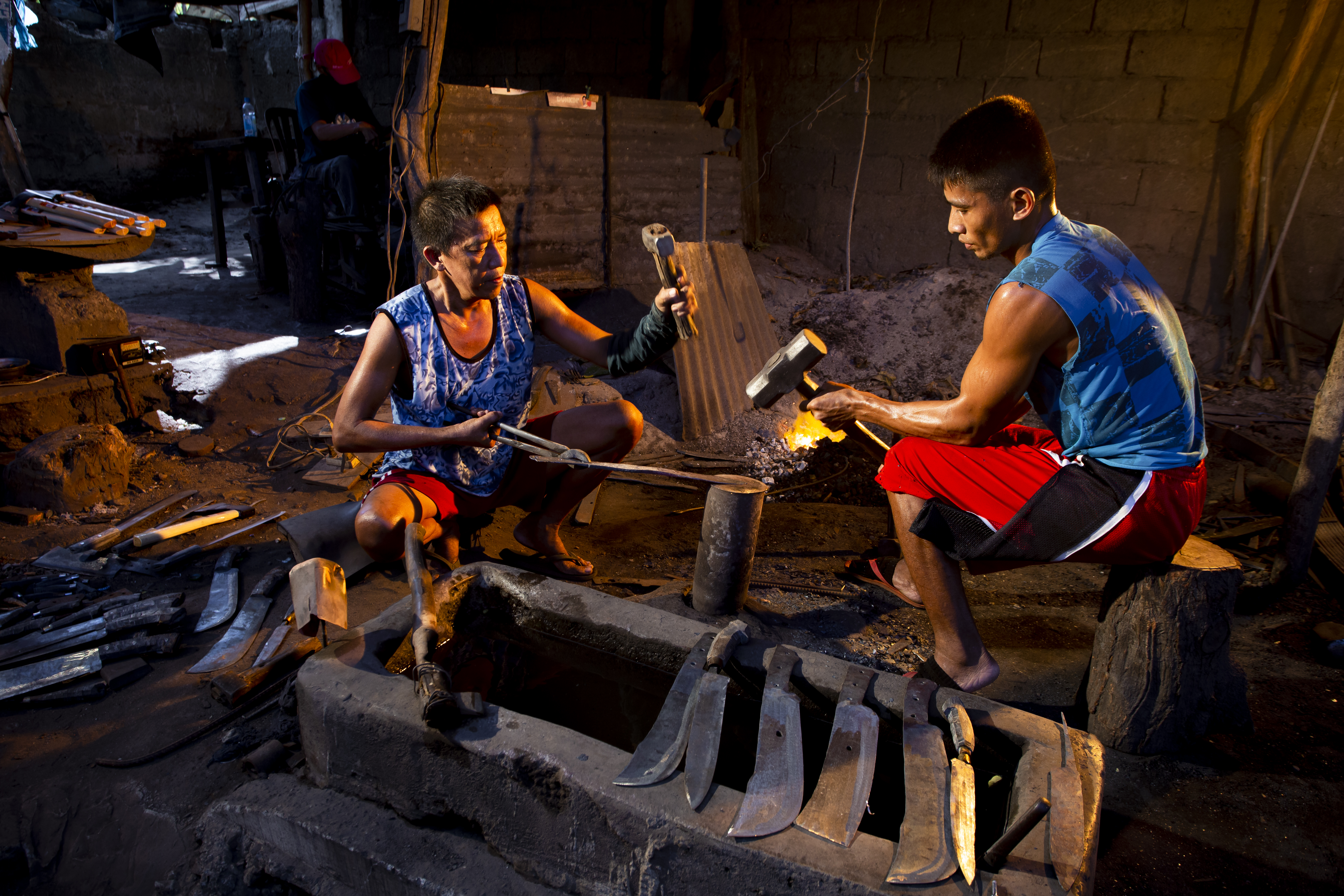
Blacksmith (Pandayan) production in Santa, Ilocos Sur.

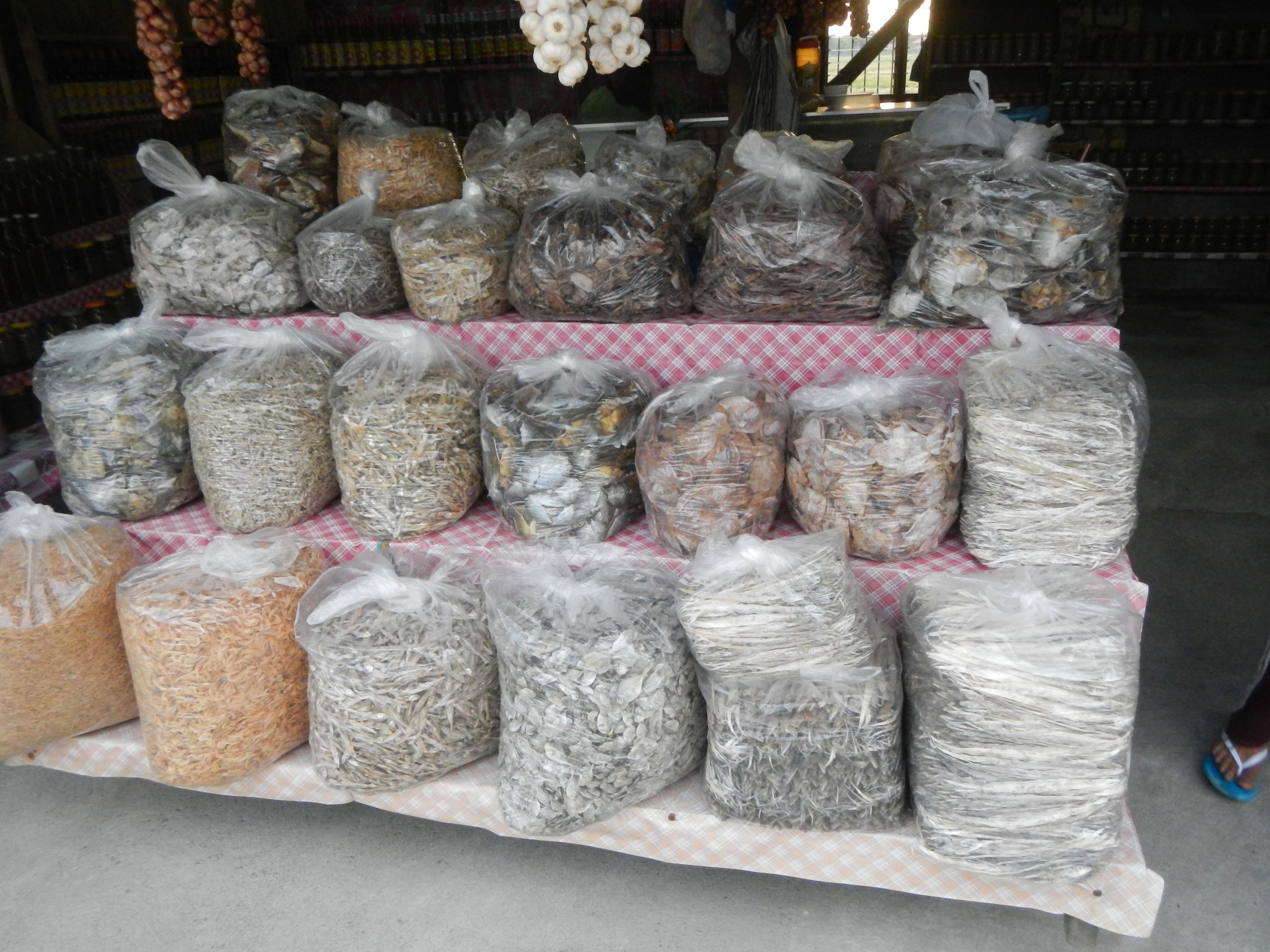
Variety of dried fish (daing) products from Pangasinan

The region is transitioning from agriculture to industrial and service-based industries. Food processing, blanket weaving, basketry, shell craft, soft broom making, pottery, fish paste, blacksmith, wine and vinegar production, jewelry making, and wood and stone crafts are significant economic drivers. Antiques and jars are also sought-after products.

The region has one international airport, Laoag International Airport, and three domestic airports: San Fernando Airport, Vigan Airport, and Lingayen Airport. Four seaports; Currimao Port (Ilocos Norte), Salomague Port (Ilocos Sur), San Fernando (Poro Point) Port (La Union), and Sual Port (Pangasinan)—support maritime trade. The region operates ten power plants with a total capacity of 1,682 MW, using wind, hydropower, coal, and oil. Major facilities include the Bauang Power Plant, Sual Coal-Fired Power Plant, San Roque Multi-Purpose Project, and Bangui Wind Farm. Most plants are managed under the Build-Operate-Transfer (BOT) scheme.

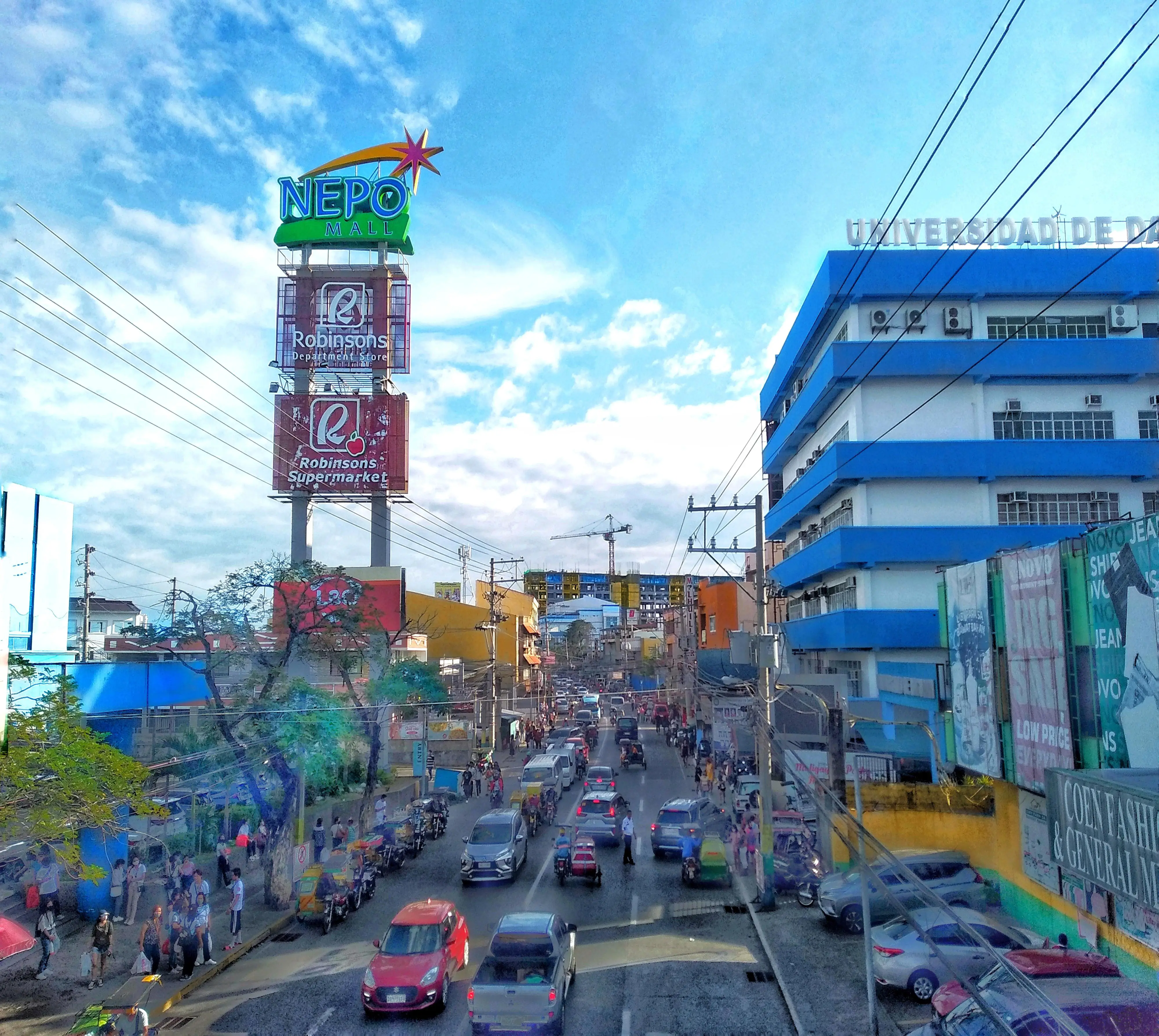
Dagupan City Central Business District

Urban centers, particularly Dagupan City, drive the service and light manufacturing industries. Dagupan serves as a financial, commercial, and educational hub, supported by local businesses such as CSI Group, Magic Group, BHF Group, Guanzon Group, St. Joseph Drugs, and Siapno-Tada Optical.

=== Transportation ===
==== Airports ====
The region has two international airports, Laoag International Airport and San Fernando Airport, where flights served around million passengers.

==== Expressways ====
The region is served by the Tarlac–Pangasinan–La Union Expressway (TPLEX), which connects the Subic–Clark–Tarlac Expressway (SCTEX) in Tarlac City to Rosario. An extension, which is 59.4 kilometers, will reach San Juan, is under pre-construction phase. Aside from that, the proposed expressway would link all the way to Laoag, which was raised during the administration of Gloria Macapagal Arroyo. According to a study by the Japan International Cooperation Agency (JICA), the proposed Ilocos Expressway, also known as the Ilocos High Standard Highway, will connect TPLEX Extension in La Union to Laoag, and is divided into two segments were mentioned in that study:

- A 46.81-kilometer route between San Fernando City and Tagudin; and
- A 142.86-kilometer route connecting Tagudin to Laoag.

== Demographics ==
The 2020 Census of Population and Housing for the Ilocos Region recorded a total household population of 5,292,297, with Ilocos Norte having 609,588 (11%), Ilocos Sur with 706,009 (13%), La Union with 822,352 (16%), and Pangasinan with 3,163,190 (60%).

Population census of Ilocos Region
Year	Pop.	±% p.a.
1903	948,935	—
1918	1,210,909	+1.64%
1939	1,459,294	+0.89%
1948	1,685,564	+1.61%
1960	2,042,865	+1.61%
1970	2,488,391	+1.99%
1975	2,726,220	+1.85%
1980	2,922,892	+1.40%
1990	3,550,642	+1.96%
1995	3,803,890	+1.30%
2000	4,200,478	+2.15%
2007	4,546,789	+1.10%
2010	4,748,372	+1.59%
2015	5,026,128	+1.09%
2020	5,301,139	+1.13%
2024	5,342,453	+0.19%
Source: Philippine Statistics Authority

The population was composed of 2.68 million males (50.7%) and 2.61 million females (49.3%). The age group 0–14 years, categorized as young dependents, consisted of 1.49 million individuals (28.2%) with a sex ratio of 108 males per 100 females. The working-age population (15–64 years) was 3.41 million (64.5%), with a sex ratio of 105 males per 100 females. The senior citizen population (65 years and older) numbered 388,000 (7.3%), with a sex ratio of 69 males per 100 females.

Children under five years old totaled 480,000 (9.1%), maintaining a sex ratio of 108 males per 100 females since 2015. The school-age population, aged 5–24 years, was 1.98 million (37.4%), showing a slight increase from 2015. The population of senior citizens (60 years and over) was 578,000 (10.9%), an increase from 493,000 in 2015. The overall sex ratio in the region was 103 males per 100 females. Women of reproductive age, 15–49 years old, totaled 1.33 million, comprising 50.7% of the female population. The population distribution highlights a male majority in younger age groups and a predominance of females among senior citizens due to longer female life expectancy.

=== Ethnicity ===
Ethnicities in Ilocos Region
1. Ilocano (58.2%)
2. Pangasinan (29.6%)
3. Tagalog (4.13%)
4. Kankanaey (1.62%)
5. Bago (1.38%)
6. Itneg (Tinguian) (0.65%)
7. Others (4.43%)

The Ilocos Region is home to a diverse range of ethnic groups. According to the 2020 census, the ethnic composition of the region is predominantly made up of Ilocanos (58.3%), followed by Pangasinans (29.7%), Tagalogs ( 4.1%), and various indigenous groups.

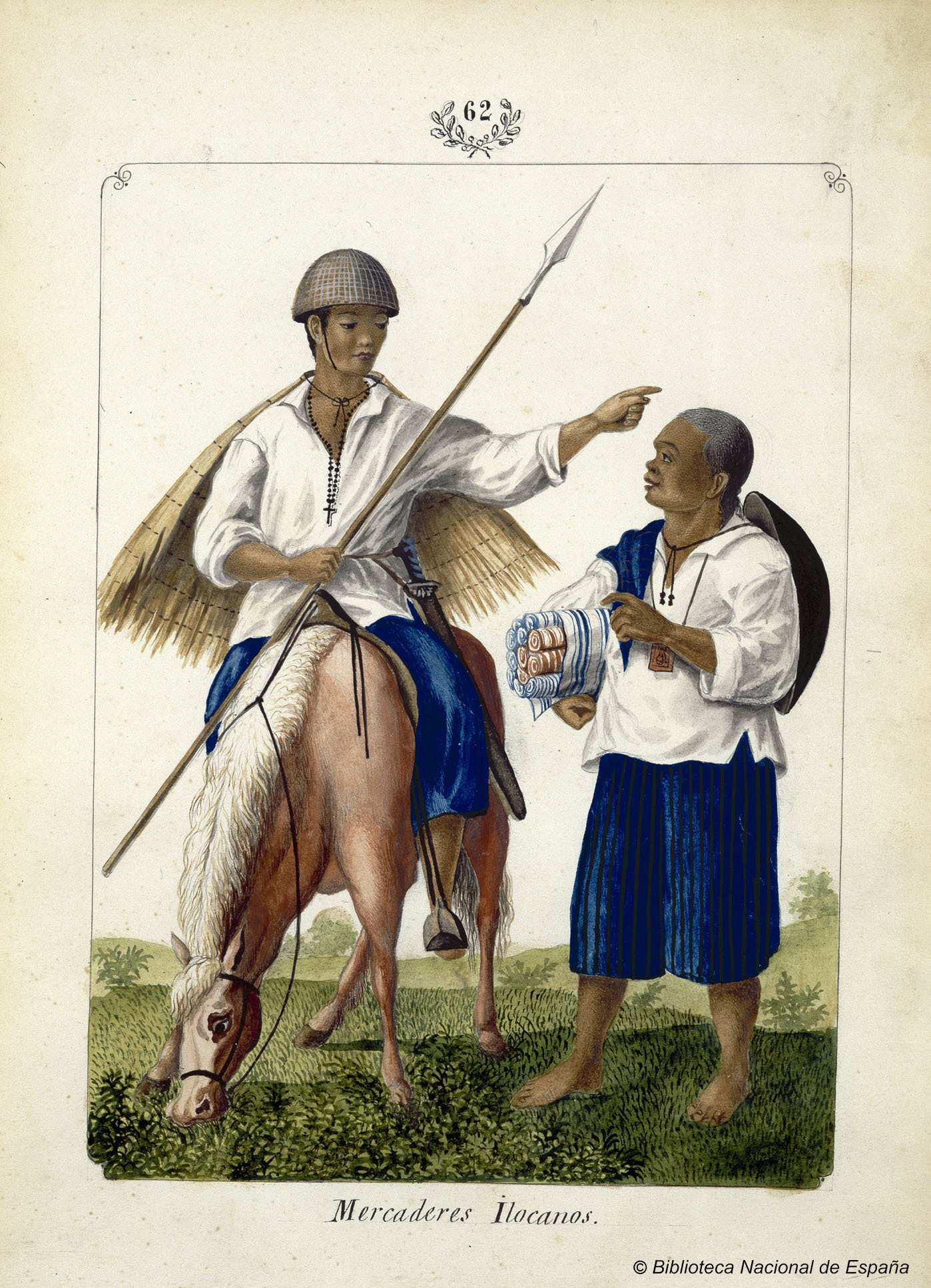
Ilocano merchants c. 1800s

The Ilocano ethnolinguistic group is the largest in the region, comprising 58.3% of the population, with a total of 3,083,391 individuals. The distribution of the Ilocano population is as follows: Ilocos Norte has 570,849 Ilocanos, Ilocos Sur has 580,484, La Union has 673,312, and Pangasinan has 1,258,746.

The Pangasinan accounts for 29.7% of the region's population, with a total population of 1,570,600. The Pangasinan population is distributed across the region as follows: Ilocos Norte has 1,156, Ilocos Sur has 1,769, La Union has 10,319, and Pangasinan has 1,557,356.

The Tagalog makes up 4.1% of the population, with a total of 219,011 Tagalog speakers. The distribution is as follows: Ilocos Norte has 9,415, Ilocos Sur has 8,721, La Union has 23,518, and Pangasinan has 177,357.

In addition to the major ethnic groups, the Ilocos Region is home to several Cordilleran (Igorot) indigenous peoples. These include the Itneg (Tingguian), with a population of 34,262, the highest concentration of which is in Ilocos Sur, the Kankanaey people, numbering 85,864, have the largest population in La Union, while the Bago people, with 73,371 members, are primarily found in Ilocos Sur. Other indigenous groups in the region include the Ibaloi in La Union, Isnag in Ilocos Norte, Balangao, Ifugao, Kalinga in Ilocos Sur, and Sambal in west Pangasinan.

Other minority groups not native in the region include Maguindanaons, Maranaos, Tausugs, Kapampangans, Cebuanos, Hiligaynons and foreigners and their Filipino-born descendants such as Chinese and Indians.

=== Language ===
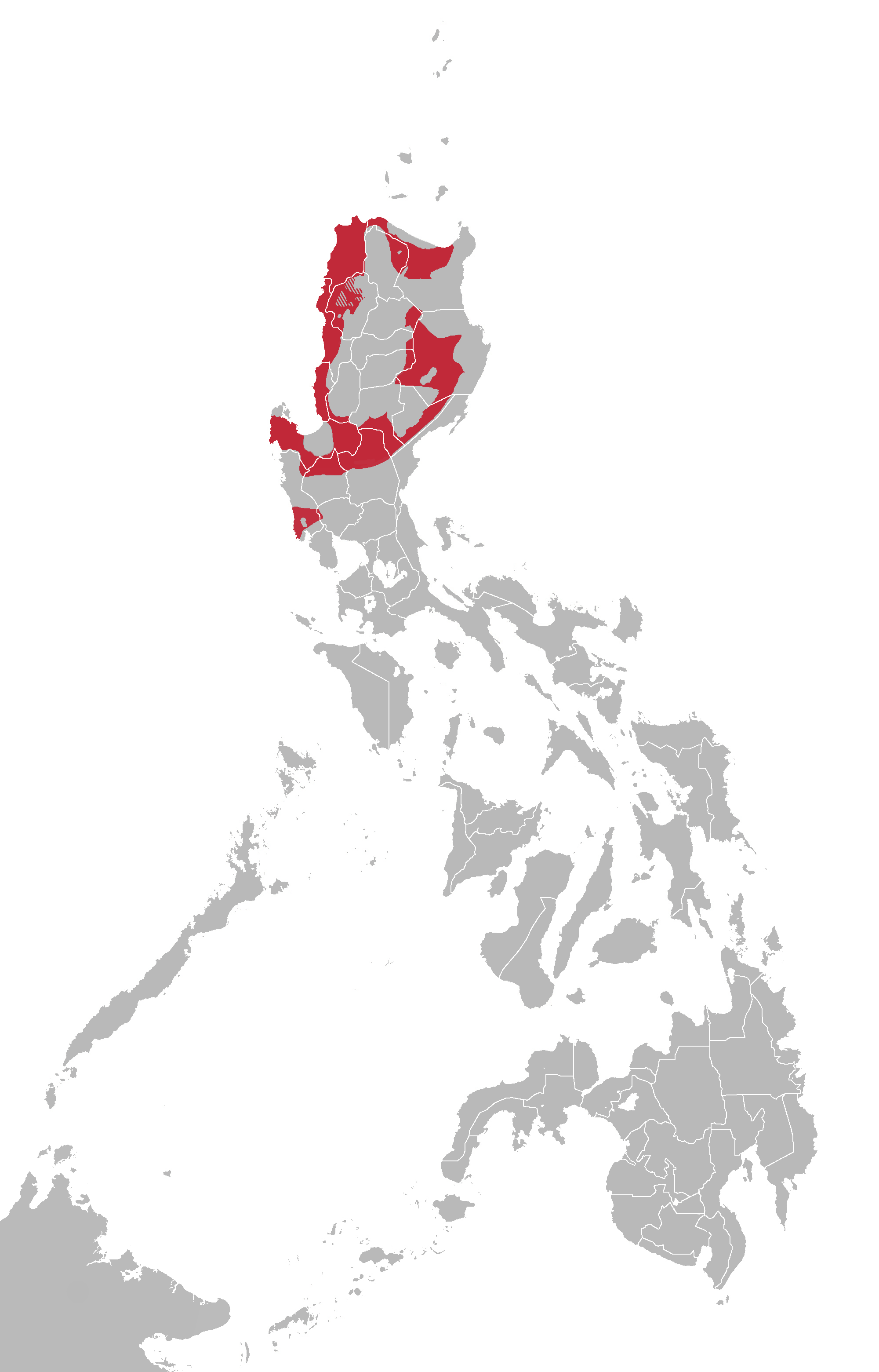
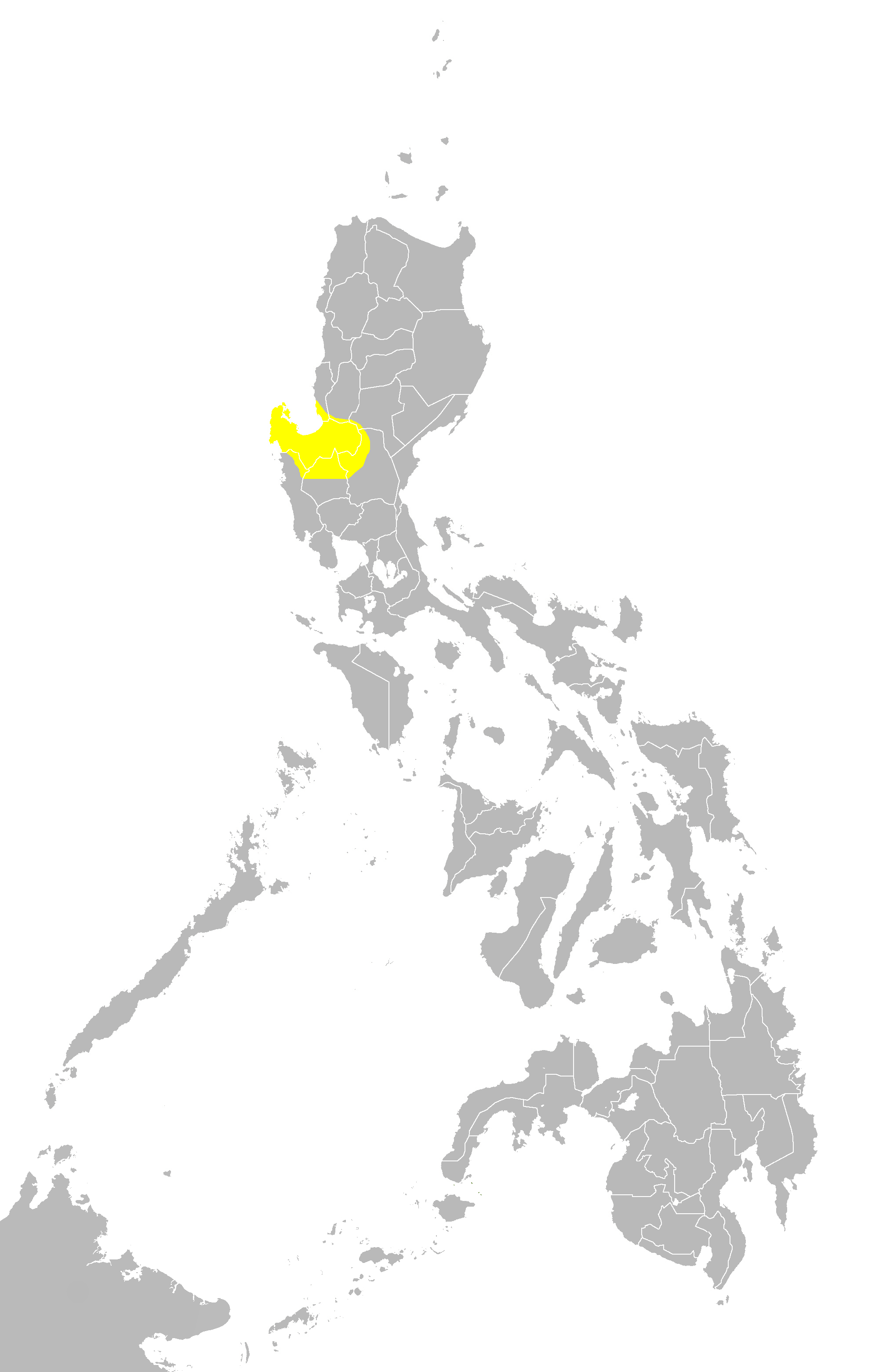
Iloco and Pangasinan language map

Ilocano is the main language of the majority in the region, with La Union recognizing it as an official language since 2012. It is also spoken in neighboring regions of Cagayan Valley (Region II), Cordillera Administrative Region and parts of Central Luzon (Region III) as the lingua franca among Ilocano and non-Ilocano residents. Ilocano is also recognized as a minority language in Mindoro, Palawan, and Mindanao (particularly in some areas in Soccsksargen), where Ilocanos had have been significant residents since the early 20th century. It is the third most widely spoken language in the Philippines, estimating 11 million speakers as of 2022. The language has many speakers overseas, including the American states of California and Hawaii.

Another major regional Philippine language spoken in the region is Pangasinan (a native language in the eponymous Pangasinan province among the ethnic group of the same name). It is the official and the indigenous language of Pangasinan and is the most spoken language in the region's highly urbanized area, Central Pangasinan. Spoken natively in urban centers such as Dagupan, Lingayen, San Carlos, among others. Native speakers can also be found in nearby Tarlac, La Union and Benguet. Significant provincial languages such as Bolinao and Sambal languages in western Pangasinan, and Cordilleran languages (near the borders of the Cordillera Administrative Region) are spoken in the region. Tagalog is spoken by residents in towns along the border with Nueva Ecija, and its standard dialect Filipino and English are also spoken and understood in the region, utilized in business, education and media.

Languages not native in the region are also spoken there such as Maranao, Maguindanaon, Tausug, Kapampangan (which Bolinao & Sambal languages are related to), Cebuano and Hiligaynon to varying degrees by their respective ethnic communities within the region.

=== Religion ===
The Ilocos Region's household population in 2020 was predominantly Roman Catholic, comprising 82.0% (4,338,887 persons) of the total population. The second-largest religious affiliation was Iglesia ni Cristo, which accounted for 3.44% (181,885 persons), followed by Aglipay with 1.97% (104,366 persons). The Iglesia Filipina Independiente represented 1.65% (87,635 persons) of the population.

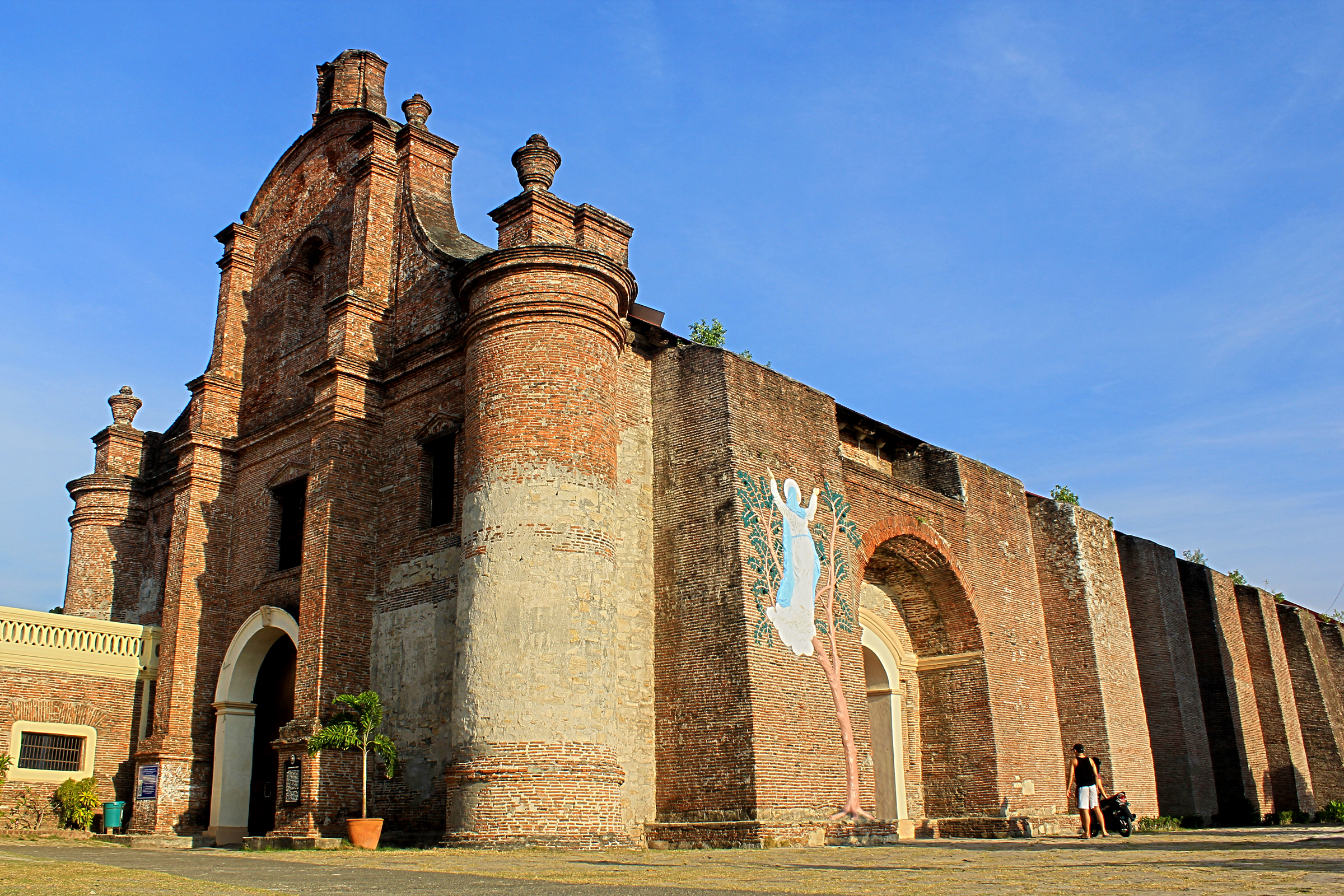
Minor Basilica of Our Lady of the Assumption, Santa Maria, Ilocos Sur

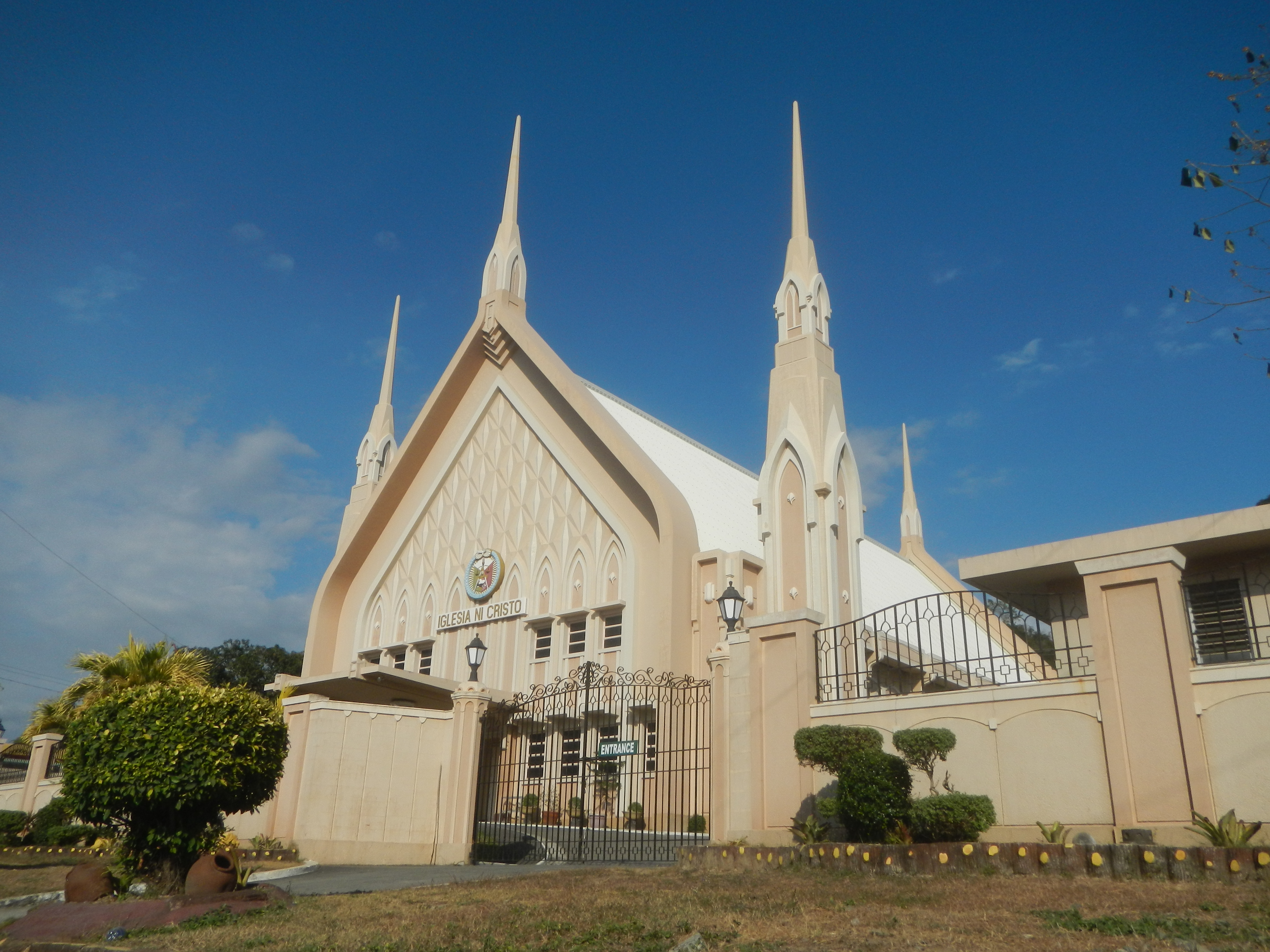
Iglesia Ni Cristo, Lokal ng Aringay, La Union

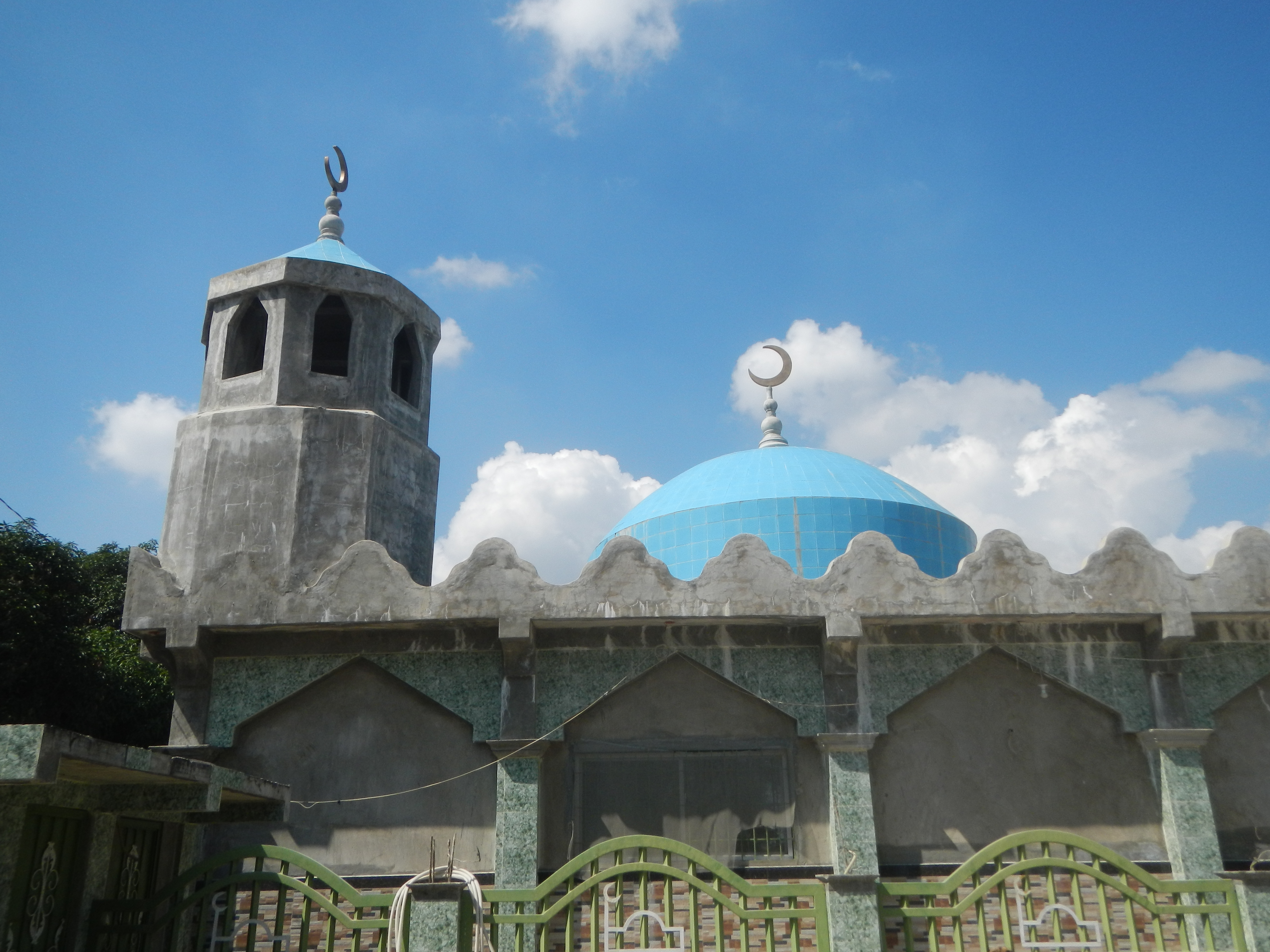
Laoac Masjid, Pangasinan

Ma-Cho Taoist Temple, San Fernando City

Protestant and other Christian groups, such as Jehovah's Witnesses, United Methodist Church, and Assemblies of God, collectively accounted for smaller percentages, each at 0.8% or lower. By province, Pangasinan had the highest proportion of Roman Catholics, representing 62.6% of the region's Catholic population (2,715,621 persons). La Union followed with 16.0% (695,867 persons), Ilocos Sur with 13.2% (574,136 persons), and Ilocos Norte with 8.2% (353,263 persons). For Iglesia ni Cristo, Pangasinan had the largest membership with 111,149 persons, followed by Ilocos Norte with 30,678 persons, and La Union with 23,374 persons.

For Islam, the Ilocos Region recorded individuals identifying with this religion in 2020. Over half were in Pangasinan, numbering 7,037 (56%), followed by 2,021 (16.2%) in La Union, 1,932 (15.5%) in Ilocos Sur, and 1,489 (11.9%) in Ilocos Norte. On the other hand, there were 653 individuals in the Ilocos Region in 2020 who identified as Buddhists. Of this number, 360 (55.1%) lived in Pangasinan, 25% in La Union, 10.4% in Ilocos Norte, and 9.5% in Ilocos Sur.

== Culture and the Arts ==
The Ilocos Region boasts a diverse cultural heritage that reflects the rich traditions of the Ilocano, Pangasinense, and Cordilleran peoples. Shaped by centuries of influences from colonial powers, neighboring regions, and native Austronesian roots, the region has managed to preserve its distinct cultural identity while skillfully integrating foreign elements with indigenous practices.

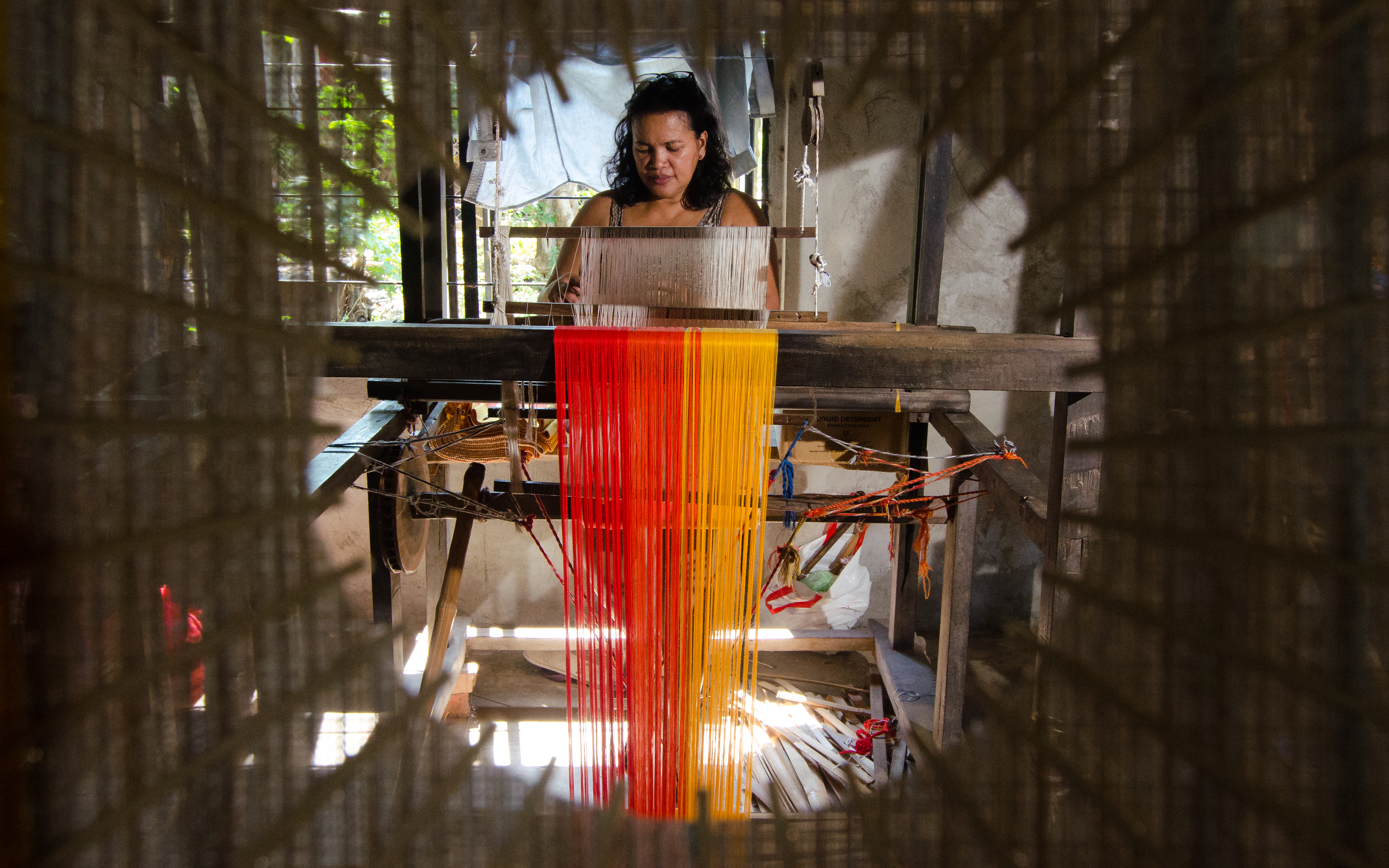
Abel (Inabel) weaver showcasing the art of traditional Ilocano weaving

In the northern part of the region, the Ilocanos are renowned for their resourcefulness and hardworking nature, shaped by the challenges of living in an area with limited farmland. Their culture emphasizes family values, frugality, and dedication to hard work. The epic story of Biag ni Lam-ang exemplifies the thriving literary tradition of the Ilocanos. Ilocano cuisine, featuring dishes like pinakbet and dinengdeng, reflects their practical use of local ingredients and preference for bold, earthy flavors. Traditional arts such as damili (red clay pottery) and inabel weaving highlight their creativity and resilience. Intricately patterned handwoven textiles, crafted on wooden looms, preserve a centuries-old art form. Music and dances like pamulinawen and balse are central to festivals and celebrations, adding to the richness of Ilocano traditions.

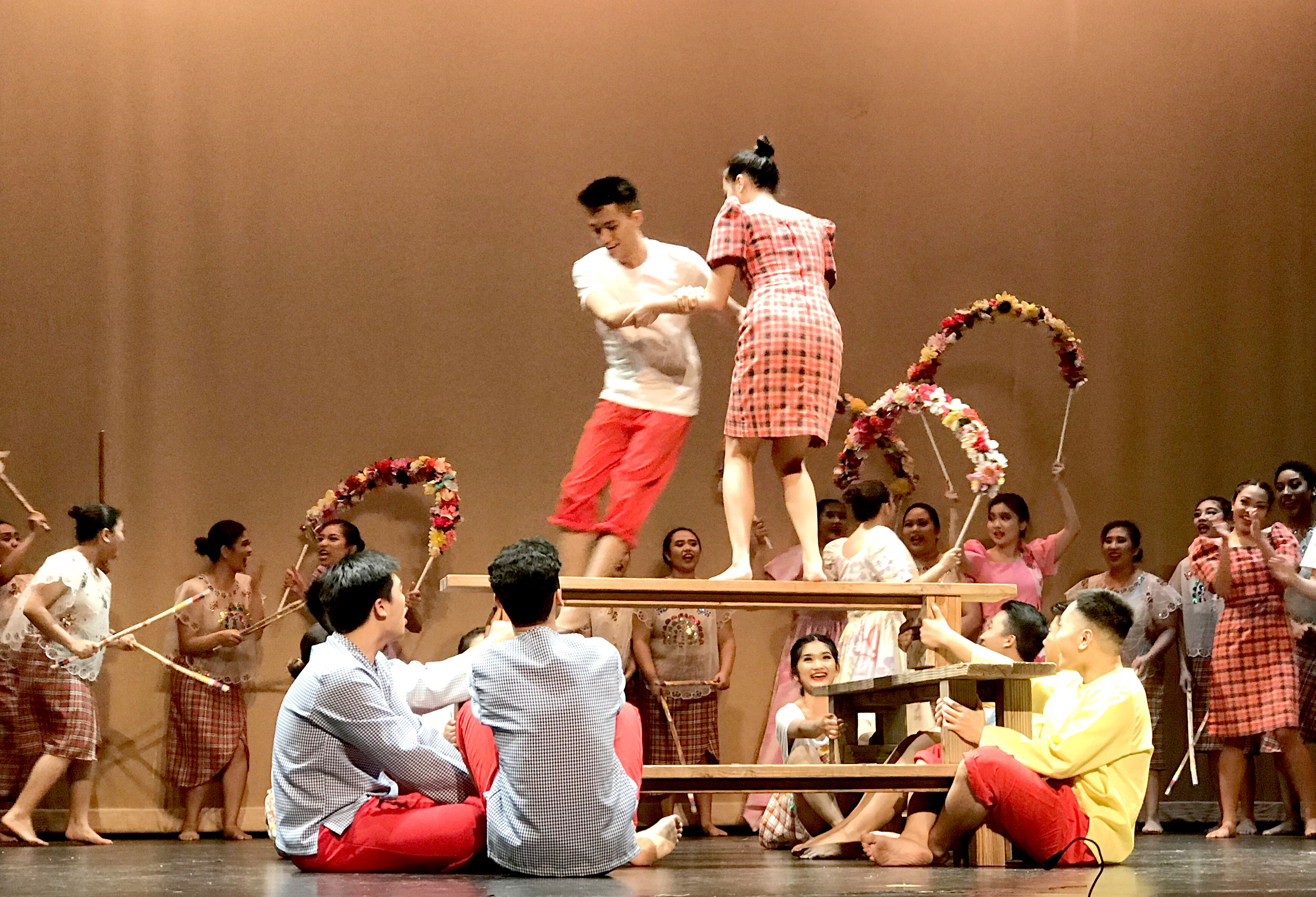
Sayaw ed Tapew na Bangko (Bench Dance), a traditional Pangasinan folk dance, originates from Lingayen

To the south, Pangasinan is known for its coastal culture and agricultural heritage. The Pangasinense people maintain traditions tied to fishing and salt-making, the latter giving the province its name, which means "place of salt." Their cuisine, featuring delights such as tupig (grilled rice cakes) and bangus (milkfish) dishes, reflects a harmonious connection between land and sea. Pangasinan also has a thriving literary tradition with forms like tongtong, uliran, diparan, and pabitla. Pangasinan folk dances like Binasuan and Sayaw ed Tapew na Bangko (Sayaw sa Bangko) reflect the Pangasinense rich cultural heritage, showcasing grace, artistry, and the community's festive traditions. The province's komedya performances, a theatrical art form introduced during Spanish colonization, merge Catholic themes with local folklore and remain a cultural highlight.

In the east, the Cordillera highlands bring a distinct mountain culture to the region. Home to the Igorots, this area is known for its iconic terraced rice fields and agricultural rituals that reflect a deep spiritual connection to nature. Cordilleran artistry shines through wood carving, bamboo crafts, metalwork, and traditional rice wine tapuy or tapuey, which reflects mastery of fermentation techniques often created for ceremonial purposes. Traditional music features instruments such as the gangsa (gongs) and kalaleng (nose flute), while dances like the kanyaw or tayaw and tadek express gratitude and reverence for ancestral spirits.

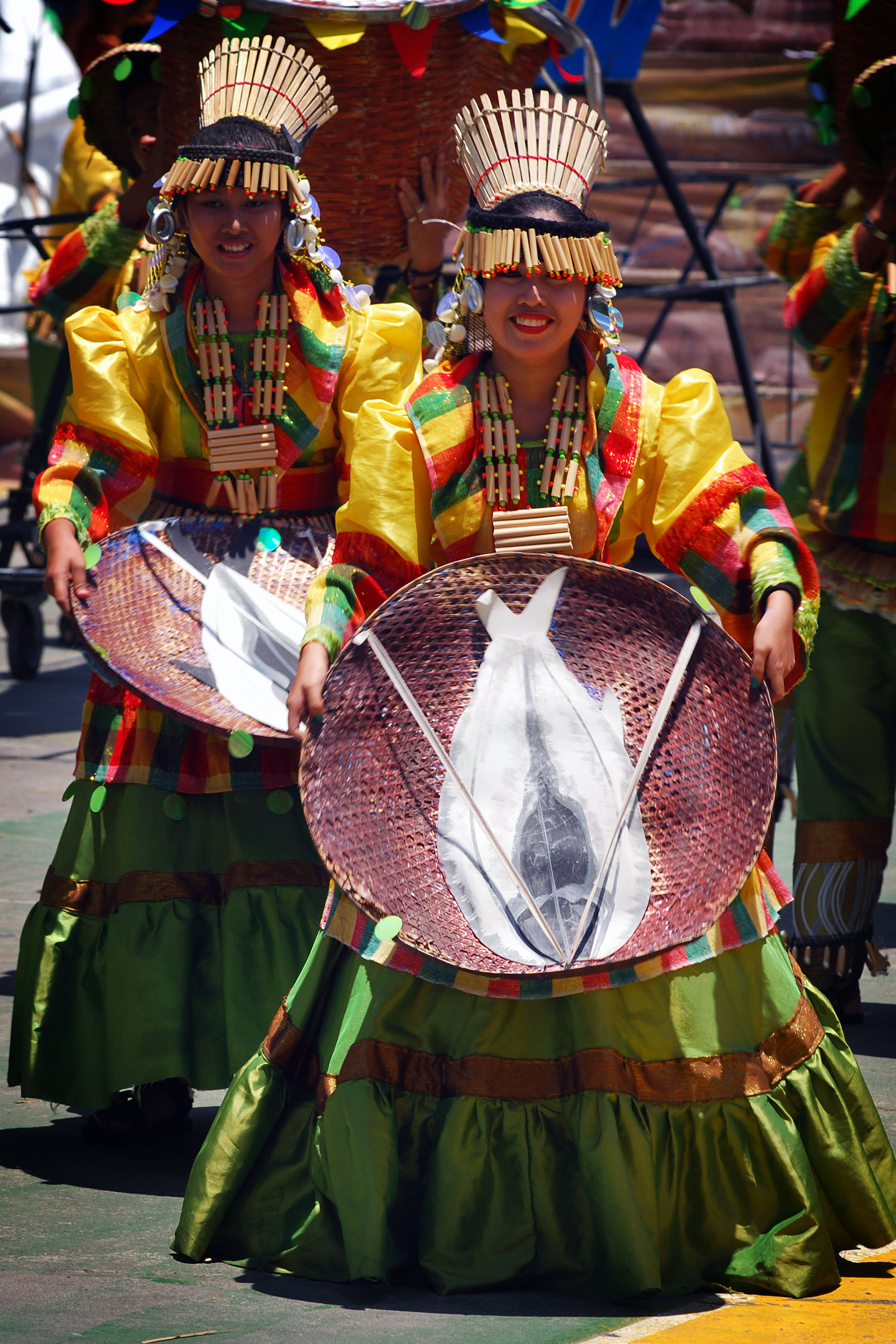
Bangus Festival - Gilon-Gilon ed Baley street dance competition

Festivals in the region, such as Pangasinan's Bangus Festival and Pista'y Dayat (Sea Festival) and Ilocos Sur's Kannawidan Festival, showcase a vibrant blend of customs, cuisine, and traditional dances. Colonial architecture, exemplified by UNESCO-recognized Vigan City, highlights the Spanish influence on the region. The binatbatan dance, performed during Vigan's festivals, celebrates the Ilocanos' indigenous weaving traditions. Similarly, Pangasinan's faith-based festivals blend Catholicism with native beliefs, reflecting the province's unique cultural identity.

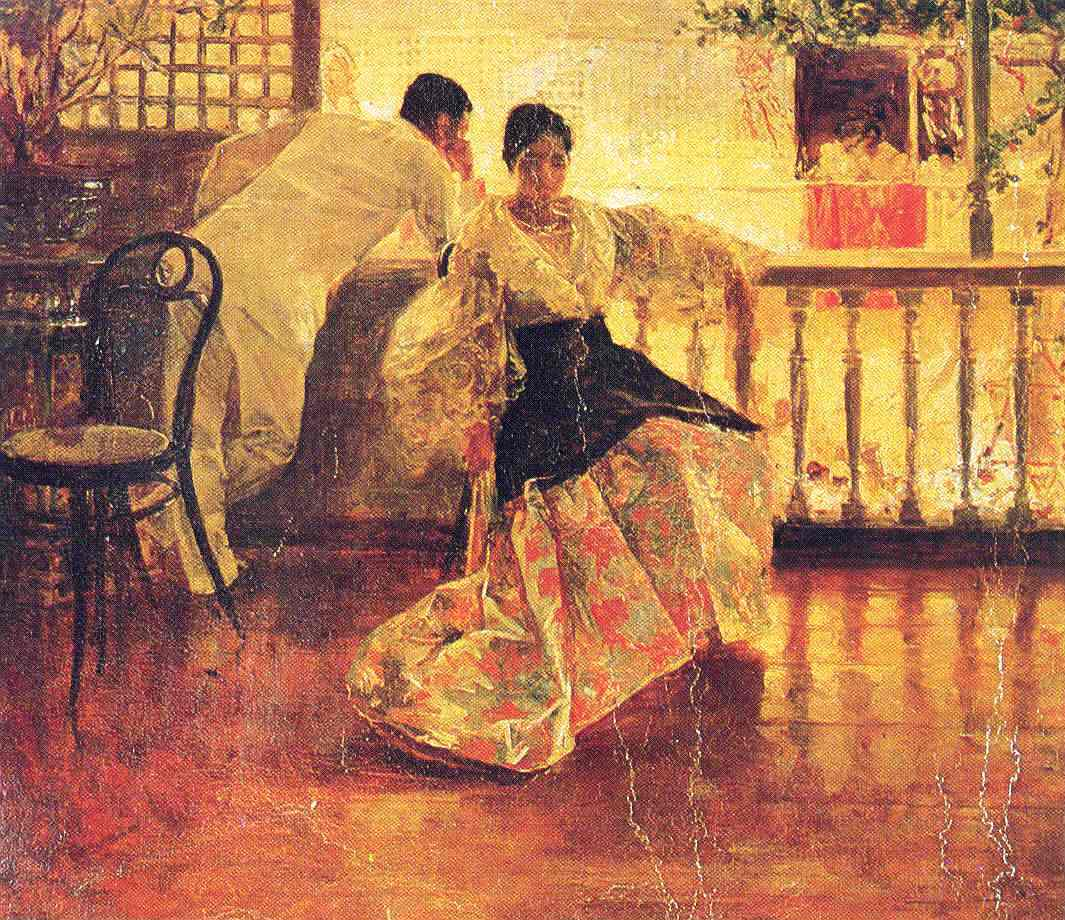
Tampuhan by Juan Luna

The region has given birth to numerous artists who have won national acclaim. Among the most notable are writer and activist Isabelo de los Reyes of Vigan, who helped publish the earliest currently extant text of Biag ni Lam-Ang; Badoc-born Philippine Revolution-era activist and leader Juan Luna; and Binalonan-born Carlos Bulosan, whose novel America is in the Heart is regarded as "the premier text of the Filipino-American experience."

The region is also home to several National Artists of the Philippines, including Victorio Cándido Edades, National Artist for Visual Arts (Painting, conferred in 1976); Lucrecia Kasilag, National Artist for Music (conferred in 1989); Severino Montano, National Artist for Theater (conferred in 2001); Francisco Sionil José, National Artist for Literature (conferred in 2001); and Salvador Bernal, National Artist for Theater and Design (conferred in 2003).

The region is home to several National Living Treasures (Gawad sa Manlilikha ng Bayan), including Magdalena Gamayo, a master weaver renowned for her expertise in the Ilocano weaving tradition of pinagabel, and Adelita Bagcal, who specializes in dallot and other Ilocano oral traditions, both from Ilocos Norte.

In contemporary arts, the Galila Arts Festival, inaugurated in 2023, features Pangasinense artists and highlights tourist spots in the fourth district of Pangasinan. Aside from fostering arts in the province, the festival also aims to attract tourists.

== Notable people ==
- Andrei Felix, filipino actor, broadcaster, and television host
- Elpidio Quirino, sixth President of the Philippines.
- Ferdinand Marcos, tenth President of the Philippines
- Vice Ganda, actor, comedian, local brand ambassador, and main tv host of It's Showtime; his former ofw mother side from San Juan
- Fidel V. Ramos, twelfth President of the Philippines, from Pangasinan
- Bongbong Marcos, seventeenth President of the Philippines
- Mariano Marcos, Former Congressman of the 2nd district of Ilocos Norte and Commonly known as father of Ferdinand Marcos, who was President of the Philippines from 1965 to 1986, and the grandfather of current senator Imee Marcos and the current 17th Philippine president Bongbong Marcos
- Isabelo de los Reyes, patriot, politician, writer, journalist, and labor activist from Vigan, Ilocos Sur; founder of the Aglipayan Church
- Gregorio Aglipay, co-founder of the Aglipayan Church, he is from Batac, Ilocos Norte
- Manuel Arguilla, writer, patriot, and martyr during the Japanese occupation from Bauang, La Union
- Salvador Bernal, his output included over 300 productions in art, film and music, and earned him the award of National Artist for Theater and Design in 2003, from Dagupan
- Gloria Diaz, Philippines - first Miss Universe from Aringay, La Union
- Victorio Edades, Father of Modern Philippine Painting. A National Artist awardee for Visual Arts (Painting) He hailed from Dagupan
- Josefa Llanes Escoda, founder of Girl Scouts of the Philippines, from Dingras, Ilocos Norte
- Lucrecia Roces Kasilag – National Artist of the Philippines for Music, from San Fernando, La Union
- Juan Luna, famous Filipino painter of the Spoliarium from Badoc, Ilocos Norte
- Antonio Luna, army general who fought in the Philippine–American War, He is from Badoc, Ilocos Norte.
- Antonio Mabutas – Agoo born first bishop of Diocese of Laoag and the second Archbishop of the Archdiocese of Davao, historically noted as the first Roman Catholic Archbishop to write a pastoral letter to criticize human rights violations under the Marcos dictatorship.
- Bienvenido Nebres – Bacnotan - raised academic, National Scientist of the Philippines for Mathematics, former Provincial Superior of the Society of Jesus in the Philippines
- Armando "Mandrake" Ducusin Palabay - Filipino student leader and activist from San Fernando La Union, honored at the Philippines' Bantayog ng mga Bayani as a martyr of the resistance against the Marcos dictatorship.
- Orlando Quevedo, cardinal and third Archbishop of the Archdiocese of Cotabato. First cardinal from Mindanao. Born and spent his early childhood in Laoag, Ilocos Norte, he had been a resident in Marbel, South Cotabato until he graduated high school
- Artemio Ricarte, Filipino general during the Philippine Revolution and the Philippine–American War
- Diego Silang, male revolutionary leader during the Spanish Occupation
- Gabriela Silang, female revolutionary leader during the Spanish Occupation
- Teofilo Yldefonso, The first Filipino and Southeast Asian to win an Olympic medal and the first Filipino olympian to win multiple medals. He is from Piddig, Ilocos Norte

== See also ==
- Amburayan
- Ilocos
- Solid North
