= COVID-19 pandemic in the Ilocos Region =

Ongoing COVID-19 viral pandemic in Ilocos Region, the Philippines

- Disease: COVID-19
- Pathogen: SARS-CoV-2
- Location: Ilocos Region
- First outbreak: Wuhan, Hubei, China
- Index case: Pangasinan and Caba, La Union
- Arrival date: March 20, 2020 (6 years, 1 month and 4 weeks)
- Confirmed cases: 144,409
- Recovered: 140,432
- Deaths: 3,136

Government website
- ro1.doh.gov.ph

The COVID-19 pandemic in the Ilocos Region is part of the worldwide pandemic of coronavirus disease 2019 (COVID-19) caused by severe acute respiratory syndrome coronavirus 2 (SARS-CoV-2). The virus reached the Ilocos Region on March 20, 2020, when the first cases of the disease were confirmed in the provinces of Pangasinan and La Union.

== Timeline ==
The first confirmed COVID-19 case in the Cordillera Administrative Region (NCR) which borders the Ilocos Region has a travel history to La Union province. CAR's first case is a resident of Manabo town in Abra province. The case confirmed on March 14, involved a 39-year-old seafarer who came from the United Arab Emirates. He consulted a hospital in San Fernando, La Union on March 10 and was designated as a person under investigation after he developed fever but was allowed to go home to Abra. He attended festivities in Abra prior to visiting a relative in La Union.

However, it was only on March 20 that the spread of COVID-19 to the Ilocos Region was officially confirmed by the Region I office of the Department of Health. The first three cases considered to be that of the Ilocos Region involved: 77-year-old man who died at the same day his COVID-19 infection was confirmed, and the two other cases were that of two local politicians of Caba, La Union Mayor Philip Caesar Crispino and his wife, Councilor Donna Crispino. The councilor is noted to have a previous travel history to Metro Manila and began manifesting symptoms on March 2.

== Response ==
=== Local government ===
==== Ilocos Norte ====
On March 13, 2020, Ilocos Norte Governor Matthew Manotoc issued Executive Order No. 59-20 which suspended classes in private and public institutions indefinitely and mandated the duties of school officials/administrators and parents/guardians, which included the adoption of and participation in alternative measures for course completion. On March 14, 2020, he signed Executive Order No. 60-20 which placed the province under community quarantine. The order activated Task Force Salun-at, which was previously institutionalized under Executive Order No. 51-20. Under the provisions of Executive Order No. 60-20, Task Force Salun-at was given authority over the province to deny entry to certain individuals based on criteria specified in the order, and enforce checking of individuals seeking entry and required clearance, endorsement, quarantine, and monitoring. The executive order also included provisions for the:

- regulation of ports and borders;
- the preparation of health information forms;
- personal and public preventive measures;
- identification of quarantine areas;
- prohibition of hoarding, reselling, and price spikes; and
- prohibition of the spreading of fake news.

By March 31, 2020, Ilocos Norte reported its first three COVID-19 positive cases: Former Senator Bongbong Marcos, who had travelled from Spain; a male patient from Batac who had recently travelled back and forth from Metro Manila several times; and a male patient from Paoay who did not have any recent travel history.

==== Ilocos Sur ====
In Ilocos Sur, Governor Ryan Luis V. Singson issued Executive Order No. 12 and Executive Order No. 13, on March 12 and 13, 2020, respectively. The executive orders mandated the suspension of classes at all levels from March 13 to April 12, 2020, as well as the suspension of other school activities that involve the gathering of crowds, at both public and private schools in the province.

On March 15, the province was placed under community quarantine through Executive Order No. 14 which restricted the movement of people to and from Ilocos Sur, mandated the establishment of checkpoints and conditions for transportation and travel, prohibited social gatherings, encouraged flexible/alternative work arrangements or suspension of work, suspended tourism, prohibited hoarding, delineated rules for business establishments, and imposed a curfew.

After the approval of "uniform travel protocols for land, air, and sea of the Department of the Interior and Local Government, crafted in close coordination with the Union of Local Authorities of the Philippines, League of Provinces of the Philippines, League of Municipalities of the Philippines, and the League of Cities of the Philippines," in Resolution No. 101, Series of 2021, Ilocos Sur Governor Ryan Luis V. Singson issued Executive Order No. 22, Series of 2021, mandating the travel protocols for implementation in the province. The resolution institutionalized the use of the System Safe, Swift, and Smart Passage (S-PaSS) Travel Management System, and the executive order eliminated the mandatory testing requirement for persons in specific traveler classifications who seek to enter or pass through the province.
