= Diego Silang =

Filipino revolutionary leader (1730–1763)

Governor of the Ilocos British Philippines
- In office 1762–1763

Personal details
- Born: Diego Silang y Andaya; December 16, 1730 Aringay, Pangasinan, Captaincy General of the Philippines, Spanish Empire (now Aringay, La Union)
- Died: May 28, 1763 (aged 32) Bantay, Ilocos, Captaincy General of the Philippines, Spanish Empire
- Cause of death: Assassination
- Spouse: Maria Josefa Gabriela Cariño (m. 1757)

Diego Silang y Andaya (Spanish: [ˈdjeɣo si.ˈlaŋg]; December 16, 1730 – May 28, 1763) was a Filipino revolutionary leader who allied with British forces to overthrow Spanish rule in the northern Philippines and establish an independent Ilocano state. His revolt was fueled by grievances stemming from Spanish taxation and abuses, and by his belief in self-government, that the administration and leadership of the Roman Catholic Church and government in the Ilocos be invested in trained Ilocano officials. His wife, the Itneg Gabriela Cariño, took on leadership of his revolt after his assassination.

== Historical accounts ==
"Diego de Silang, a Filipino, very quick and artful, and who being a native of Manila [ie island of Luzon], spoke the Spanish language well, began to revolutionize this province, by telling his countrymen, that in order to maintain the Catholic faith, and to preserve the country in obedience to the King, it was requisite to join together and arm against the Spaniards, and deliver them up to the English, against whom they had no means of resistance. These specious arguments made an impression on the minds of the chiefs, and many plebeians, particularly those of Vigan, which is the capital of the province, and residence of the Bishop. The seduced Filipinos presented themselves armed, and demanded that the Alcalde should give up the staff of government, and deposit it in the hands of the Vicar-general. The majority advised the Alcalde to defend himself against this attack; but instigated by his fears, or swayed by the opinion of injudicious friends, he resigned the command to the Vicar-general, and with no inconsiderable share of hazard of his life, effected his escape from the province. Emboldened by their success in this instance, the rebels demanded of the Bishop elect, Señor Ustariz, a Dominican, an exemption from the tribute, declaring that they acted justifiable in deposing the Alcalde. The Bishop pledged himself to lay before Señor Anda a favourable representation of their claims; but Silang being determined on acquiring the command, and little satisfied with what he had done, began to collect troops for more extensive operations."

Joaquín Martínez de Zúñiga (1805)

== Early life ==
Diego Silang was born on December 16, 1730 in Aringay, which was then a part of Pangasinan. Today, this area is encompassed by present-day Caba or Aringay in La Union. His father was Pangasinense, while his mother was Ilocano. He was baptized on January 7, 1731 in Vigan in the then-undivided province of Ilocos. There, young Diego worked as a messenger for a local Castilian priest. Bright, passionate, and fluent in Spanish, he ferried correspondence from the Ilocos to Manila; journeys that gave him his first glimpse of colonial injustice and that planted the seed of rebellion.

== Revolt ==
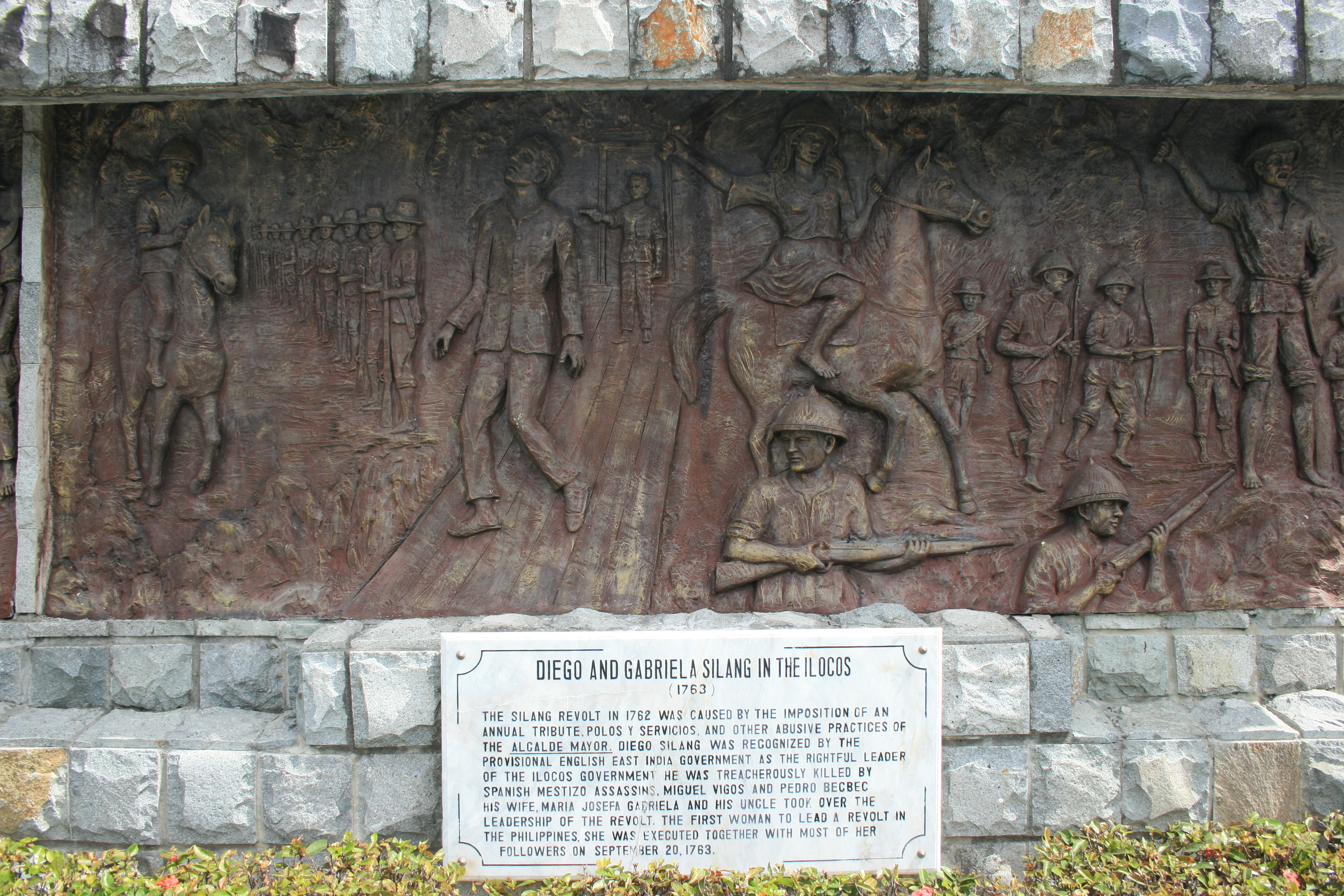
Silang revolt monument in Corregidor

Spain allied with France during the Seven Years' War, in opposition to Great Britain. The British in response sought to weaken the Spanish Empire. The seizure of Manila by British naval forces in October 1762, and the subsequent surrender of the Spanish Philippines to Britain during the British occupation of the Philippines, inspired uprisings in the farthest north of Ilocos Norte and Cagayan, where anti-Spanish sentiments festered. Though Silang initially wanted to replace Spanish functionaries in the Ilocos with native-born officials and volunteered to head Ilocano forces on the side of the Spanish, desperate Spanish administrators instead transferred their powers to the Catholic Bishop of Nueva Segovia, who rejected Silang's offer.

== Assassination ==
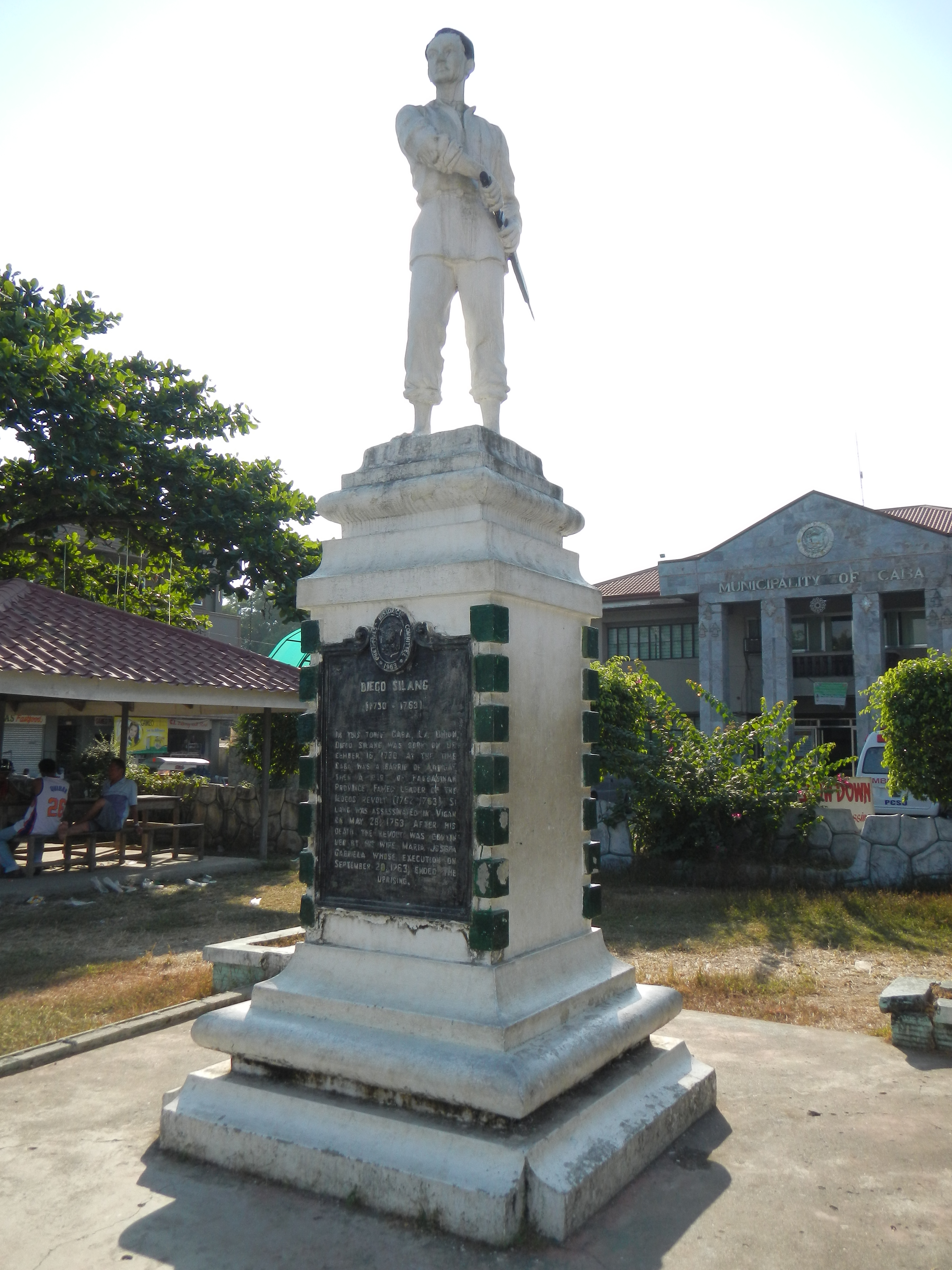
Memorial of Diego Silang in Caba, La Union

Diego Silang was killed on May 28, 1763 by one of his friends, a Spanish-Ilocano mestizo named Miguel Vicos, whom church authorities paid to assassinate Silang with the help of Pedro Becbec. He was 32 years old.

== Legacy ==
After Silang's death, his Spanish-Itneg mestiza wife, Gabriela Silang, took command of the revolt and fought courageously. The Spanish sent a strong force against her. She was forced to retreat to what is now Abra. Gabriela led her troops towards Vigan but was driven back. She fled again to Abra, where she was captured. Gabriela and her men were summarily hanged on September 20, 1763, she being hanged the last.

The Philippine Navy named two of its frigate in his honor. First is BRP Diego Silang (PF-9) which served from 1976 through 1990, and BRP Diego Silang (FFG-07) which entered service in 2025.

== In popular culture ==
- Portrayed by José Padilla Jr. in the 1951 film, Diego Silang.
- Portrayed by Mario Montenegro in the 1975 musical, Dung-aw.
- Portrayed by Gardo Versoza in the 1995 TV Series Bayani in this episode "Diego Silang: Ang Sulat".
- Portrayed by JC Tiuseco in the 2013 TV series, Indio.
- Portrayed by Marc Abaya in Wagas in this episode "Wagas: Diego at Gabriela Silang".
