= Caba, La Union =

Municipality in La Union, Philippines

Caba
- Municipality
- Municipality of Caba
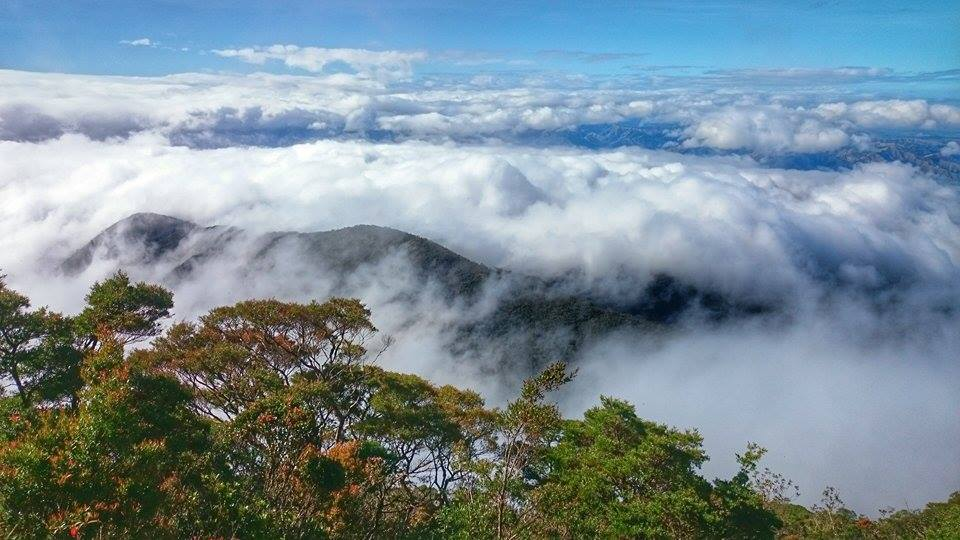
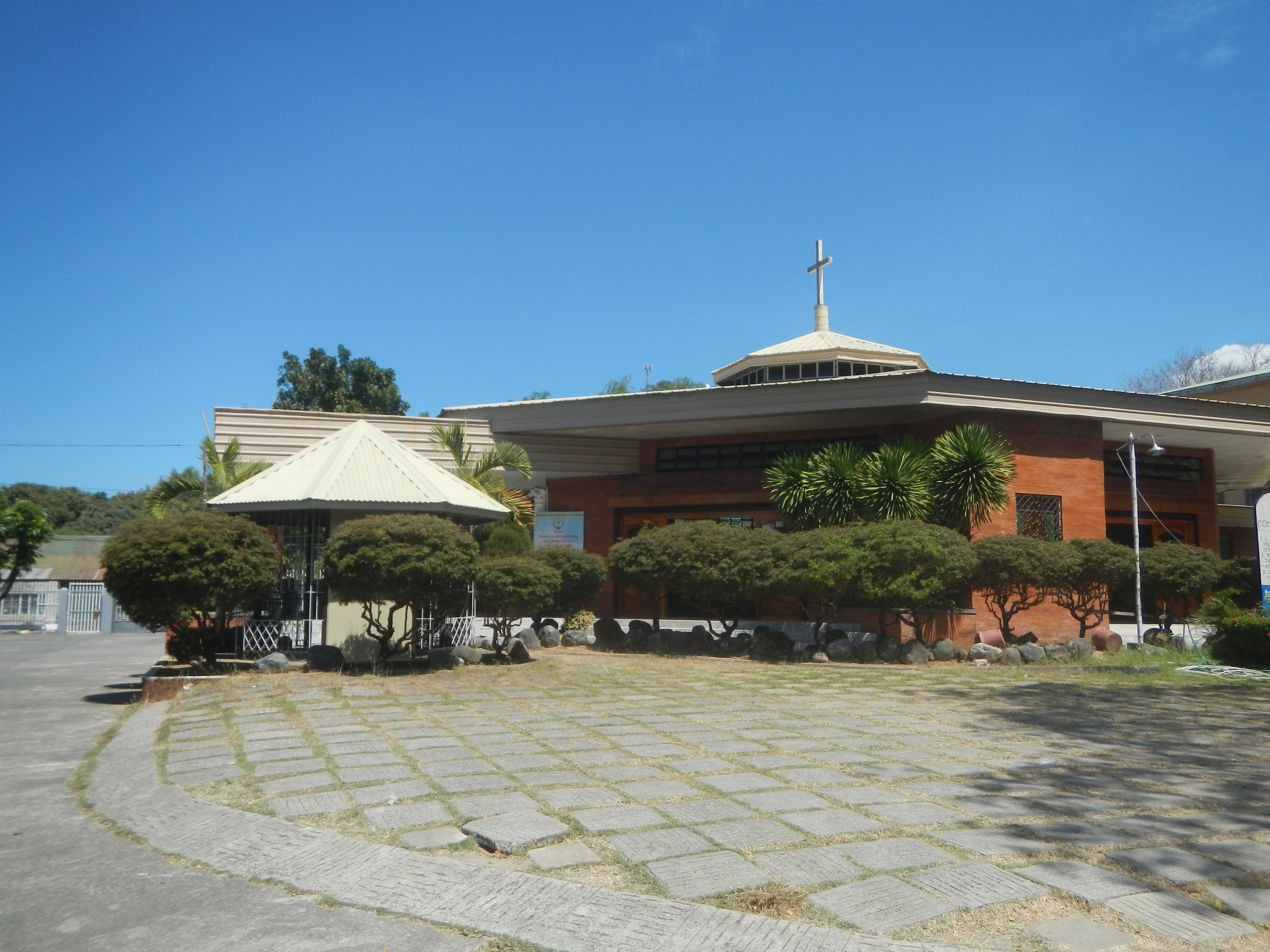
- Mt. Kimmallugong, Diego Silang Monument and Saint John the Baptist Parish Church

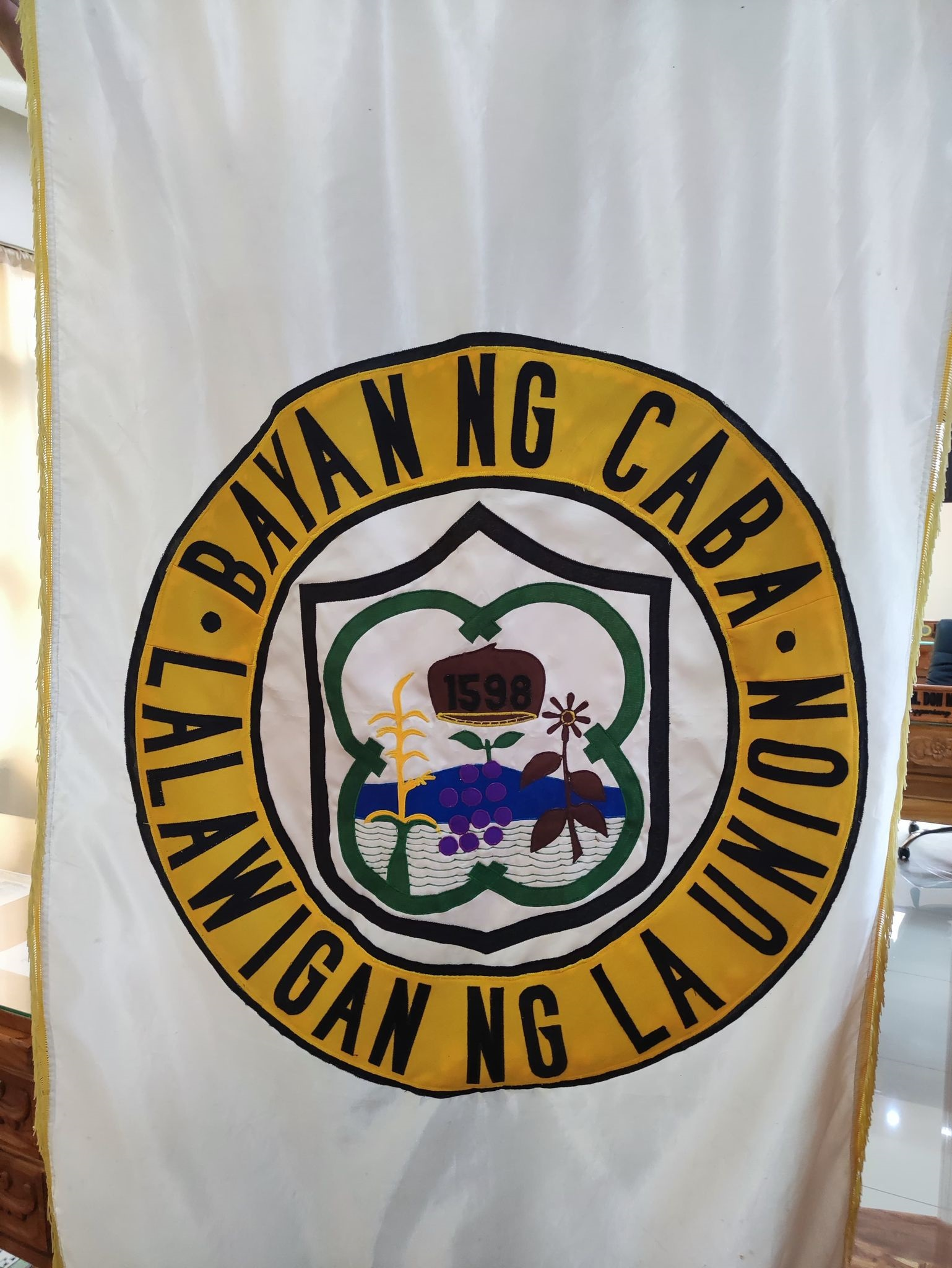
- Flag Seal
- Motto: "Abante Caba"
- Anthem: Caba Hymn
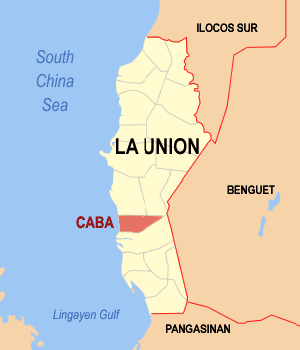
- Map of La Union with Caba highlighted
- Interactive map of Caba
- Location within the Philippines
- Coordinates: 16°25′54″N 120°20′41″E
- Country: Philippines
- Region: Ilocos Region
- Province: La Union
- District: 2nd district
- Barangays: 17 (see Barangays)

Government
  - Type: Sangguniang Bayan
  - Mayor: Genefer Garcia Bulao-Madriaga
  - Vice Mayor: Conrado Vito
  - Representative: Dante S. Garcia
  - Municipal Council: Members: Ronnie P. Mangaser; Carl Divinagracia; Robert Nillusguin; Paquito Maglaya Jr.; Joseph Maglaya; Imelda Vallejo; Tito Torres; Raffy Oyando
  - Electorate: 18,649 voters (2025)

Area
  - Total: 46.31 km^{2} (17.88 sq mi)
- Elevation: 41 m (135 ft)
- Highest elevation: 299 m (981 ft)
- Lowest elevation: 0 m (0 ft)

Population (2024 census)
  - Total: 23,432
  - Density: 506.0/km^{2} (1,310/sq mi)
  - Households: 5,923

Economy
  - Income class: 1st municipal income class
  - Poverty incidence: 11.77% (2023)
  - Revenue: ₱ 175.8 million (2024)
  - Assets: ₱ 646.7 million (2024)
  - Expenditure: ₱ 147.5 million (2024)
  - Liabilities: ₱ 95.96 million (2024)

Service provider
  - Electricity: La Union Electric Cooperative (LUELCO)
- Time zone: UTC+8 (PST)
- ZIP code: 2502
- PSGC: 0103309000
- IDD : area code: +63 (0)72
- Native languages: Ilocano; Pangasinan; Tagalog
- Website: www.caba.gov.ph

Caba, officially the Municipality of Caba (Ilocano: Ili ti Caba; Pangasinan: Baley na Caba; Filipino: Bayan ng Caba), is a coastal municipality in the province of La Union, Philippines. According to the 2024 census, it has a population of 23,432 people.

It was the birthplace of Diego Silang, a prominent Filipino revolutionary leader who led an uprising against Spanish colonial rule in the Ilocos Region in 1762. The municipality is also known for its thriving bamboo industry and its scenic beaches. As of 2022, Caba had 17,787 registered voters.

== Etymology ==
The town has historically been referred to by three names: Caba, Cava, and Caua. According to local historian Pedro Manongdo, two main theories explain the origin of the town's name.

One theory suggests that the name originated from an incident when a Spaniard asked an inhabitant for the name of the place. The youth, misunderstanding the question as referring to the animal he was herding, responded with “Cava.” The name was subsequently repeated and evolved into Cava, and later Caba.

Another theory posits that the name Caba was adopted by a group of immigrants from Barrio Caba in San Carlos, Pangasinan, who settled in the area during the later years of the 16th century. In recognition of their place of origin, they named their new settlement Caba.

== History ==
=== Early history ===
The town of Caba was historically part of the ancient region of Pangasinan, known as Alingay or Alinguey (modern-day Aringay). The area was initially settled by Pangasinenses along the coastal regions, accompanied by smaller communities of Samtoys (Ilocanos). These early inhabitants practiced animism, a belief system attributing spiritual significance to natural objects and phenomena, which played a significant role in shaping their cultural and religious traditions.

The coastal settlement was an active trading hub, engaging with neighboring coastal and highland communities, including the Pangasinenses along Lingayen Gulf, Ilocanos (Samtoys) to the north and the Ibalois, Kankanaey, and Ifugao from the Cordillera mountains following the Aringay trail. The settlement also traded with foreign merchants from China, Japan, and other Maritime Southeast Asian countries. Frequently traded goods included gold, jars, silk, woven fabrics, ceramics, and glass beads and others, reflecting the region's economic vitality.

=== Spanish Colonization ===
In 1572, Spanish conquistador Juan de Salcedo and his soldiers arrived in the area after pacifying the nearby settlement of Aroo or Agoho (modern-day Agoo), which had a significant Japanese trading presence. As part of his mission to subjugate northern regions following the Spanish conquest of Manila, Salcedo named the area "El Puerto de Japon" ("Japanese Port") due to the active trade conducted by Japanese and Chinese merchants. Although Salcedo attempted to persuade the locals to pay tribute to Spain, he continued his journey northward, eventually founding Vigan as "Villa Fernandina de Vigan" in honor of Prince Ferdinand, the late son of King Philip II.

By 1598, Augustinian friars formally established the settlement, with Don Agustin de la Cruz appointed as its first leader. The area became a barrio in 1692, led by Don Luis Manongdo as the cabeza de barangay. The settlement operated under the encomienda system, where local inhabitants were entrusted to Spanish encomenderos, friars, and native nobles in exchange for tribute and governance. The name "Cava" or "Caba" has two conflicting origins: one theory attributes it to immigrants from Barrio Caba in San Carlos, Pangasinan, while another suggests it derived from a Spaniard’s interaction with a local boy who responded "cava" when asked the name of the place.

During the 1700s, Ilocano immigrants from the Ilocos provinces and nearby towns began settling in the coastal areas. Seeking to escape oppressive conditions imposed by Spanish colonizers, they cultivated the land through agriculture and fishing, further contributing to the settlement's development.

In 1745, Caba, initially a barrio of Aringay, was established as a municipality under the jurisdiction of the Province of Pangasinan and the Bishopric of Nueva Segovia. Don Pablo Vergara was the first gobernadorcillo, as noted by Father Jose Braganza, SVD. However, historian Julian Martin claims that Caba was founded in 1844. By 1783, under Don Domingo Aragon’s leadership as gobernadorcillo, Caba had developed into a town.

==== Silang Revolt ====
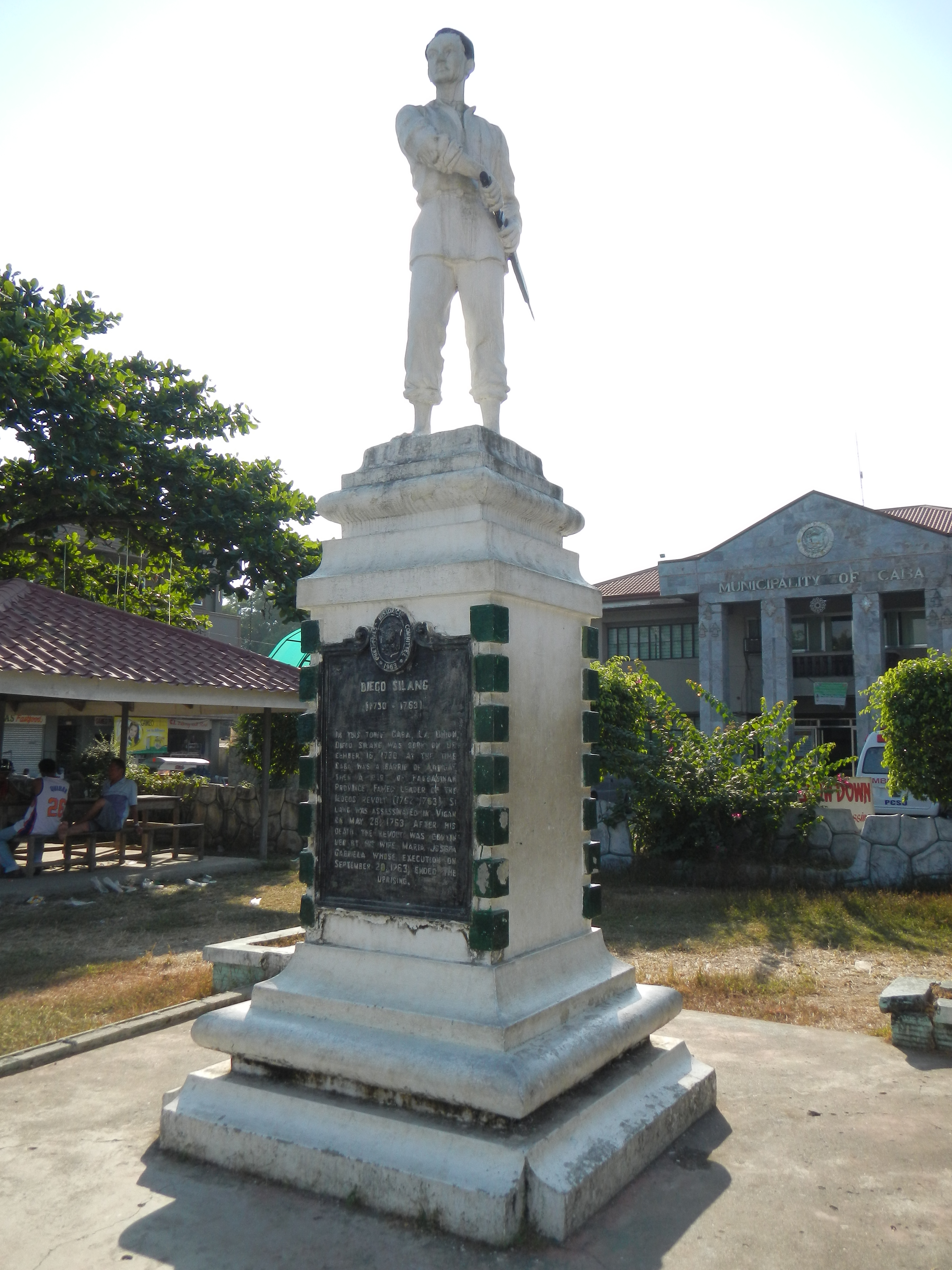
Diego Silang statue in Caba town proper

Diego Silang, a native of Caba, emerged as a prominent leader during the Ilocos Revolt of 1762-1763. Historians recognize him as the “guiding genius of the Iloco war of independence” and an able military leader. Silang established an independent rebel government in Northern Luzon and advocated for reforms within the colonial government. However, on May 28, 1763, he was assassinated by one of his followers in a treacherous act orchestrated by Spanish authorities. His wife, Gabriela Silang, took up the cause and continued the rebellion until her capture and public execution in Vigan on September 20, 1763. Despite their tragic deaths, their resistance left a lasting legacy.

==== Creation of La Union ====
On October 29, 1849, Governor-General Narciso Zaldua Clavería issued a decree merging eight towns from Pangasinan, three from Ilocos Sur, and territories in the Cordillera to form the province of La Union. On March 2, 1850, Governor-General Antonio María Blanco signed the Superior Decreto, officially establishing La Union as a province and Captain Toribio Ruiz de la Escalera as the first Gobernador Military y Politico. Among its founding towns were Caba, San Fernando (the cabecera), Santo Tomas, Rosario, Tubao, Agoo, Aringay, Naguilian, Bauang, San Juan, Balaoan, Luna, Bangar, and Bacnotan. On April 18, 1854, Queen Isabella II of Spain issued the royal decree (real orden) from Madrid confirming Blanco's Superior Decreto.

==== Philippine Revolution ====
During the Philippine Revolution, Caba’s residents actively participated in the struggle for independence from Spain. Under the leadership of General Manuel Tinio y Bondoc, allied with Emilio Aguinaldo, they engaged in battles against Spanish forces in Northern Luzon. The town served as a strategic passageway and refuge for Aguinaldo and his troops during their movements northward.

=== American Colonization ===
During the Philippine-American War, American forces set foot on La Union soil on November 20, 1899. Filipino guerrillas were prepared for action, with the town becoming a center of resistance led by Guerrilla Unit No. 1 under the leadership of Captain Rivera. The unit operated in Caba and nearby areas, including Naguilian and Galiano (now part of Burgos). These guerrilla efforts played a crucial role in resisting American forces and defending the town's autonomy during the conflict.

In 1903, the Philippine Commission reorganized the administrative and territorial structure of municipalities across the country. Due to a sparse population and financial challenges, smaller municipalities were merged. As a result, Caba was integrated with Aringay, while Santo Tomas was merged with Agoo.

In 1907, Executive Order No. 41 was issued, mandating the separation of Caba from Aringay. This order took effect on January 1, 1908, officially restoring Caba as a regular municipality, with Francisco Sobredillo serving as its Chief Executive.

=== Japanese Occupation ===
Caba, along with the nearby towns of Agoo and Bauang were the first places the Japanese invasion force sought to control during the main effort to capture Luzon at the beginning of World War 2 - now known as the Japanese Invasion of Lingayen Gulf. Capturing the three towns which were connected by a high quality road, but protected on one side by the ocean and the other by the sea, meant that the Japanese forces were easily able to establish a secure beachhead. Once they had done so, they launched attacks against defense forces at San Fernando, La Union and Rosario, La Union, and from there they deployed southwards across the plains of Pangasinan and Tarlac to take Fort Stotsenburg in Pampanga, then Bulacan, and finally Manila.

=== During the Marcos dictatorship ===
The beginning of the 1970s marked a period of turmoil and change in the Philippines because Ferdinand Marcos had used foreign debt to fund too many public works projects as he headed his 1969 reelection campaign, which led to the 1969 Philippine economic crisis and the First Quarter Storm protests. La Union residents mostly did not speak up about the economic stresses they were experiencing, but when Marcos declared martial law in 1972, Caba was included with the rest of the country.

Marcos' efforts to consolidate political power did not get much resistance in the La Union, including Caba, and La Union residents mostly did not speak up about the economic stresses they were experiencing. This was because Marcos took advantage of strong political ties to La Union, and allowed the powerful family factions (which had dominated La Union politics since before the American colonial era) to stay in place.

=== Later 20th Century ===
After Marcos fled into exile after the civilian-led 1986 People Power revolution, Edgar T. Bacungan was appointed OIC mayor under the new Provisional Revolutionary Government. He was then properly elected into office when the Fifth Philippine Republic was established, serving until 1992.

Caba was heavily affected by the 1990 Luzon earthquake.

== Geography ==
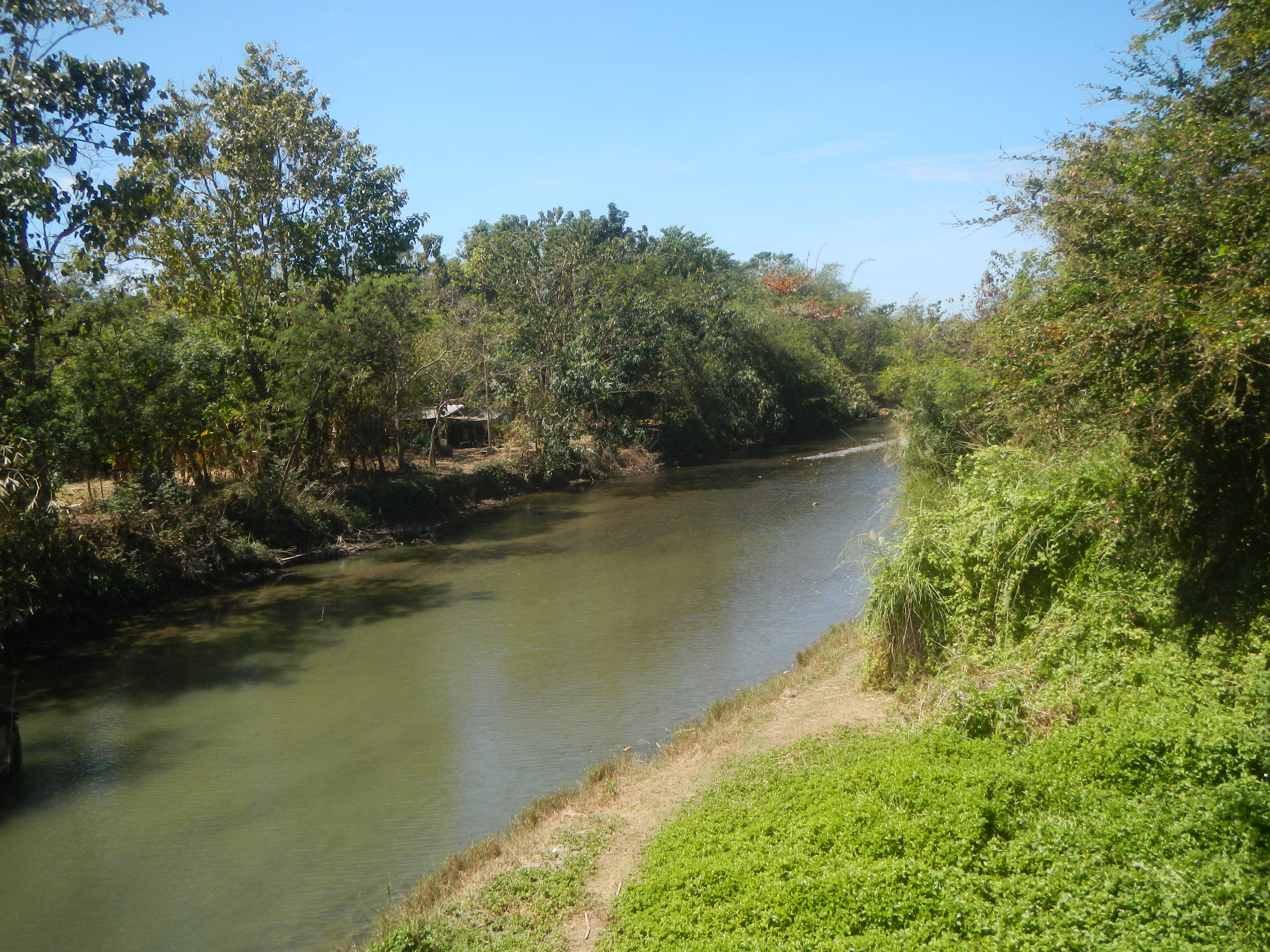
River creek in Las-ud

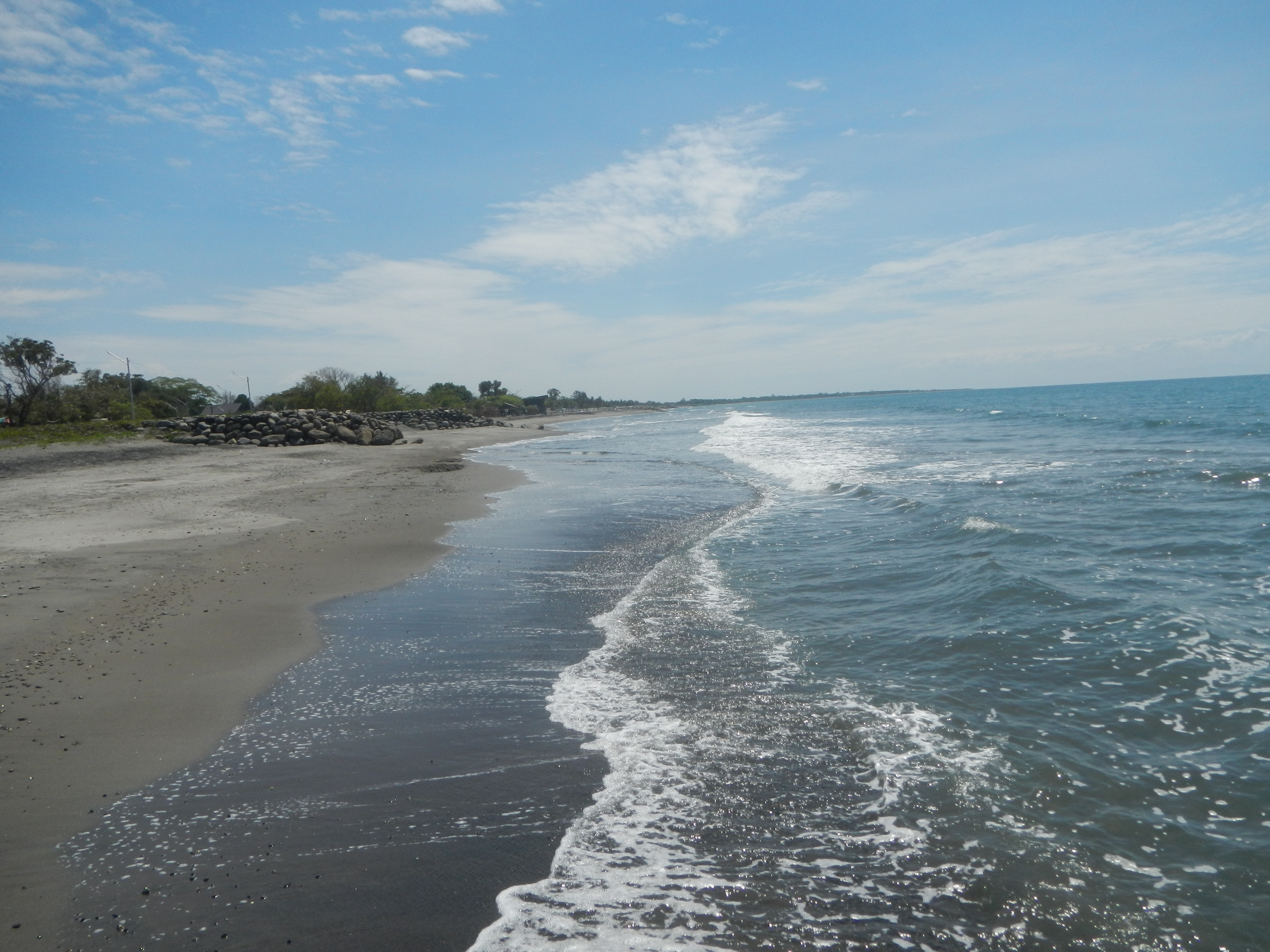
Coastal area in San Carlos

The Municipality of Caba is a coastal town characterized by predominantly hilly terrain, with grasslands, wetlands, and scrublands. That runs through several rivers and creeks. It has a total land area of 46.31 square kilometers (17.88 square miles), which constitutes 3.09% of La Union's total area. According to the 2020 Philippine Statistic Authority Census, Caba had a population of 23,119, representing 2.81% of the total population of La Union province and 0.44% of the overall population of the Ilocos Region. The population density is calculated at 499 inhabitants per square kilometer (1,293 inhabitants per square mile).

The town covers a total land area of 4,631 hectares (11,440 acres). Bordered by Bauang to the north, Naguilian to the northeast, Aringay to the south, and the South China Sea (or Lingayen Gulf) to the west.

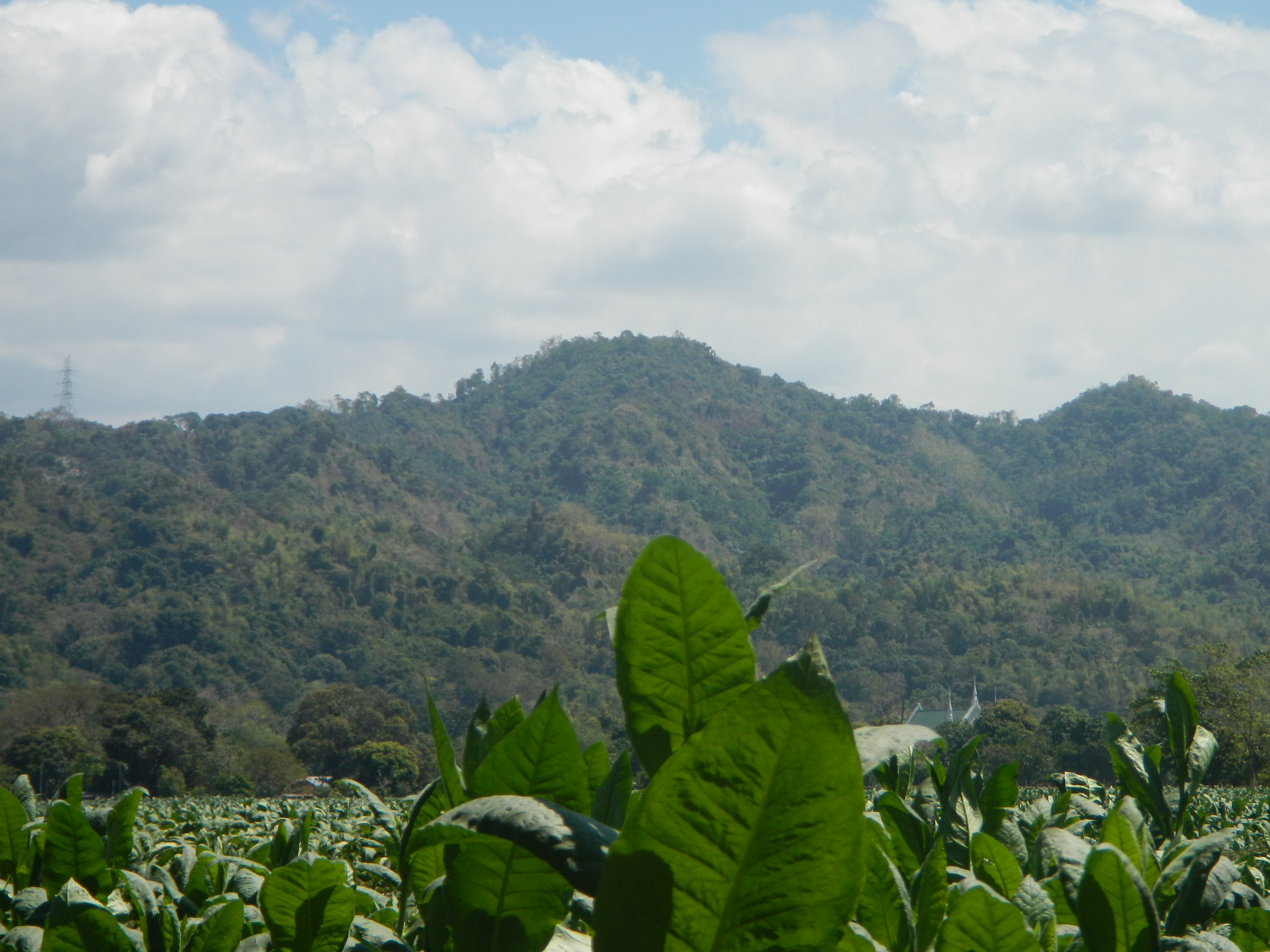
Terrain in Santiago Norte

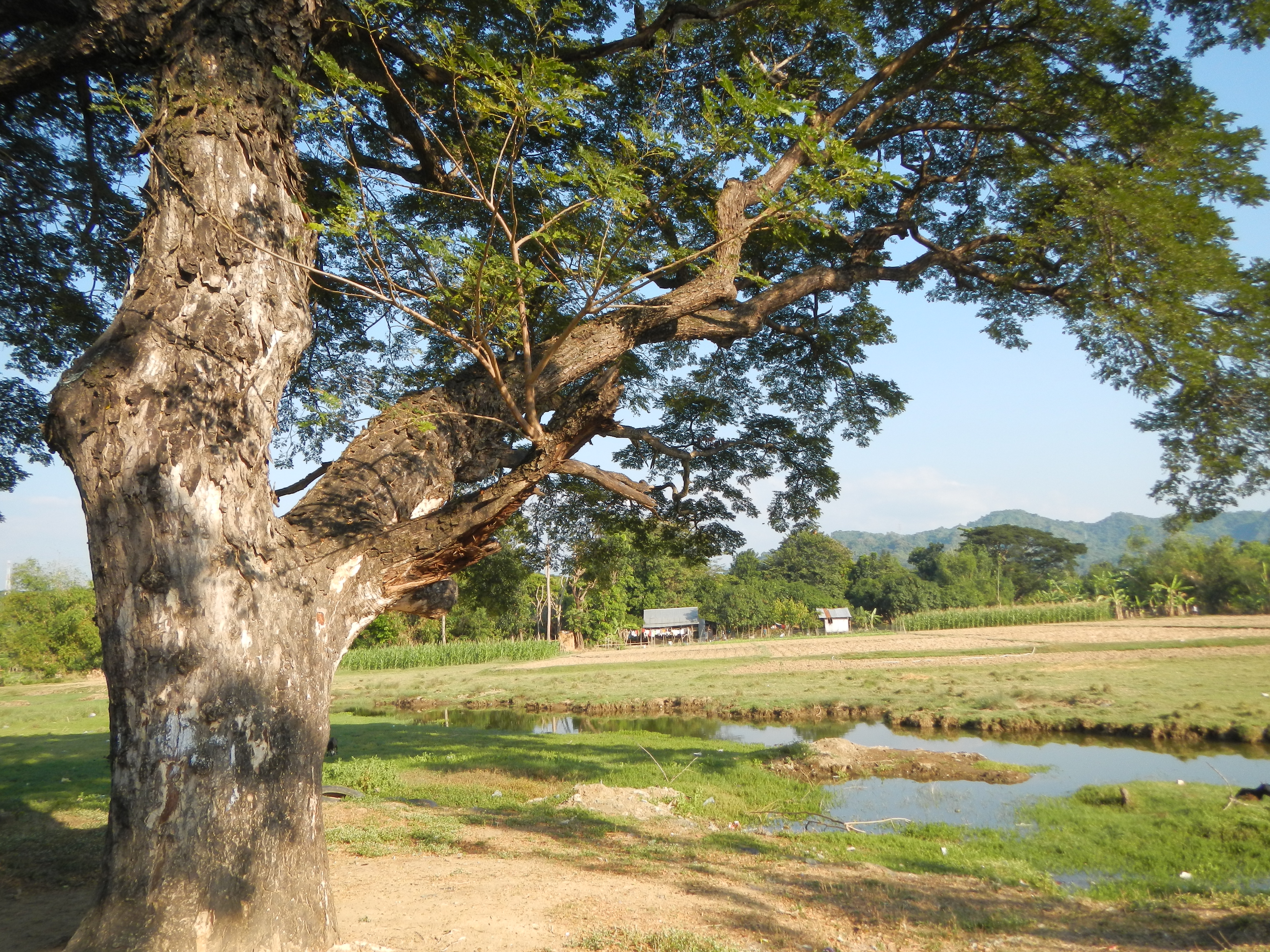
Wetland in around rural area

Caba is situated 21.49 kilometres (13.35 mi) from the provincial capital San Fernando, and 245.73 kilometres (152.69 mi) from the country's capital city of Manila.

=== Barangays ===
Caba is politically subdivided into 17 barangays. Each barangay consists of puroks and some have sitios.

- Bautista
- Gana
- Juan Cartas
- Las-ud
- Liquicia
- Poblacion Norte
- Poblacion Sur
- San Carlos
- San Cornelio
- San Fermin
- San Gregorio
- San Jose
- Santiago Norte
- Santiago Sur
- Sobredillo
- Urayong
- Wenceslao

=== Climate ===
The town experiences a Type I climate as defined by the Köppen Climate Classification, which features a clear division between wet and dry seasons. The wet season typically starts around mid-May and continues until late October, while the dry season lasts from December through early May. Heavy rainfall is brought by the Southwest Monsoon (SWM) during the wet season, whereas the Northeast Monsoon (NEM) leads to drier conditions as it moves over the Cordillera Mountains.

Climate data for Caba, La Union
Month	Jan	Feb	Mar	Apr	May	Jun	Jul	Aug	Sep	Oct	Nov	Dec	Year
Mean daily maximum °C (°F)	30 (86)	32 (90)	33 (91)	34 (93)	33 (91)	31 (88)	30 (86)	29 (84)	30 (86)	31 (88)	31 (88)	31 (88)	31 (88)
Mean daily minimum °C (°F)	20 (68)	21 (70)	22 (72)	24 (75)	25 (77)	25 (77)	25 (77)	25 (77)	24 (75)	23 (73)	22 (72)	23 (73)	23 (74)
Average precipitation mm (inches)	15 (0.6)	16 (0.6)	24 (0.9)	33 (1.3)	102 (4.0)	121 (4.8)	177 (7.0)	165 (6.5)	144 (5.7)	170 (6.7)	56 (2.2)	23 (0.9)	1,046 (41.2)
Average rainy days	6.3	6.6	9.5	12.8	20.6	23.5	25.4	23.4	23.2	21.4	14.0	8.2	194.9
Source: Meteoblue

== Demographics ==
Population census of Caba
Year	Pop.	±% p.a.
1903	3,967	—
1918	5,860	+2.64%
1939	6,873	+0.76%
1948	7,320	+0.70%
1960	9,517	+2.21%
1970	11,719	+2.10%
1975	13,029	+2.15%
1980	14,114	+1.61%
1990	16,620	+1.65%
1995	18,234	+1.75%
2000	19,565	+1.52%
2007	20,927	+0.93%
2010	21,244	+0.55%
2015	22,039	+0.70%
2020	23,119	+1.01%
2024	23,432	+0.32%
Source: Philippine Statistics Authority

As of the 2020 Census of Population and Housing (2020 CPH), the municipality of Caba, La Union had a total population of 23,119 persons. This represented an increase of 1,080 persons compared to the 2015 Census of Population, which recorded 22,039 persons. The population growth from 2015 to 2020 yielded an average annual population growth rate (PGR) of 1.01%, meaning that for every 1,000 persons in the population, about 10 people were added per year. In comparison, the PGR during the period from 2010 to 2015 was 0.70%, and from 2000 to 2010 it was 0.83%.

At the current growth rate, Caba's population is projected to double in approximately 69 years. For historical context, the population of Caba was 9,517 persons in 1960, which is more than two-fifths of the population recorded in 2020. The town has 99.68% of the population had their births registered with the Local Civil Registry Office. Of these, 50.77% were male, and 49.23% were female, with a sex ratio of 103 males for every 100 females.

Caba is divided into 17 barangays. In 2020, the most populous barangay was San Jose, which comprised 12.11% of the municipality's total population. It was followed by Barangay Gana with 9.72%, Santiago Sur at 9.01%, San Carlos with 6.50%, and Sobredillo with 6.09%. The least populated barangay was Wenceslao, which accounted for just 2.01% of the total population and was also the least populous barangay in the 2015 census.

=== Gender and Age ===
In 2020, the population was 50.75% male and 49.25% female, with a sex ratio of 103 males for every 100 females. The ratio for those under 15 was 106 males to 100 females, and for ages 15 to 64, it was 107 males to 100 females. For those 65 and older, there were 62 males for every 100 females. The median age was 28.94 years in 2020, up from 27.75 in 2015. The largest age group was 15–19 years (9.14%), followed by 10–14 years (9.02%) and 20–24 years (8.98%). Males outnumbered females in the younger age groups, while females outnumbered males in the older age groups.

=== Language and Ethnicity ===
The majority of Caba's population is Ilocano, while Iloco is the primary language spoken, with Filipino and English used in government and business. English is also the primary medium of instruction in schools.

=== Voting ===
In 2022 the town has 17,787 registered voters as according Commission on Elections. The voting-age population (18 and older) was 68.84% in 2020. The dependency ratio was 49, meaning there were 49 dependents (children and elderly) for every 100 working-age individuals. This was an improvement from the 2015 ratio of 54.

=== Marital ===
Among those aged 10 and older, 37.53% were never-married, 41.53% were married, 5.89% were widowed, 2.17% were divorced or separated, and 12.86% were in common-law or live-in relationships. 55.51% of the never-married were male.

=== Religion ===
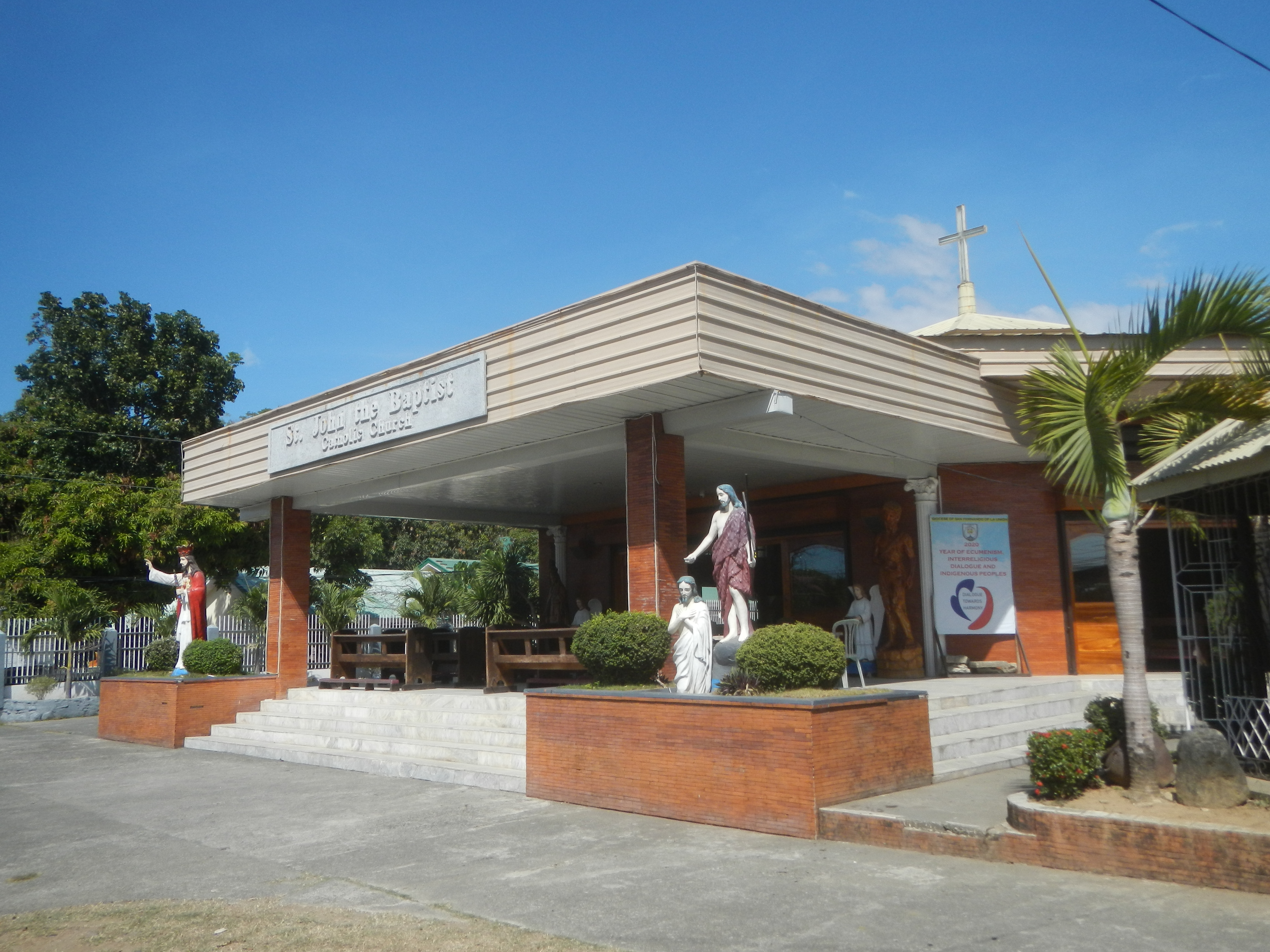
Saint John the Baptist Parish Church of Caba

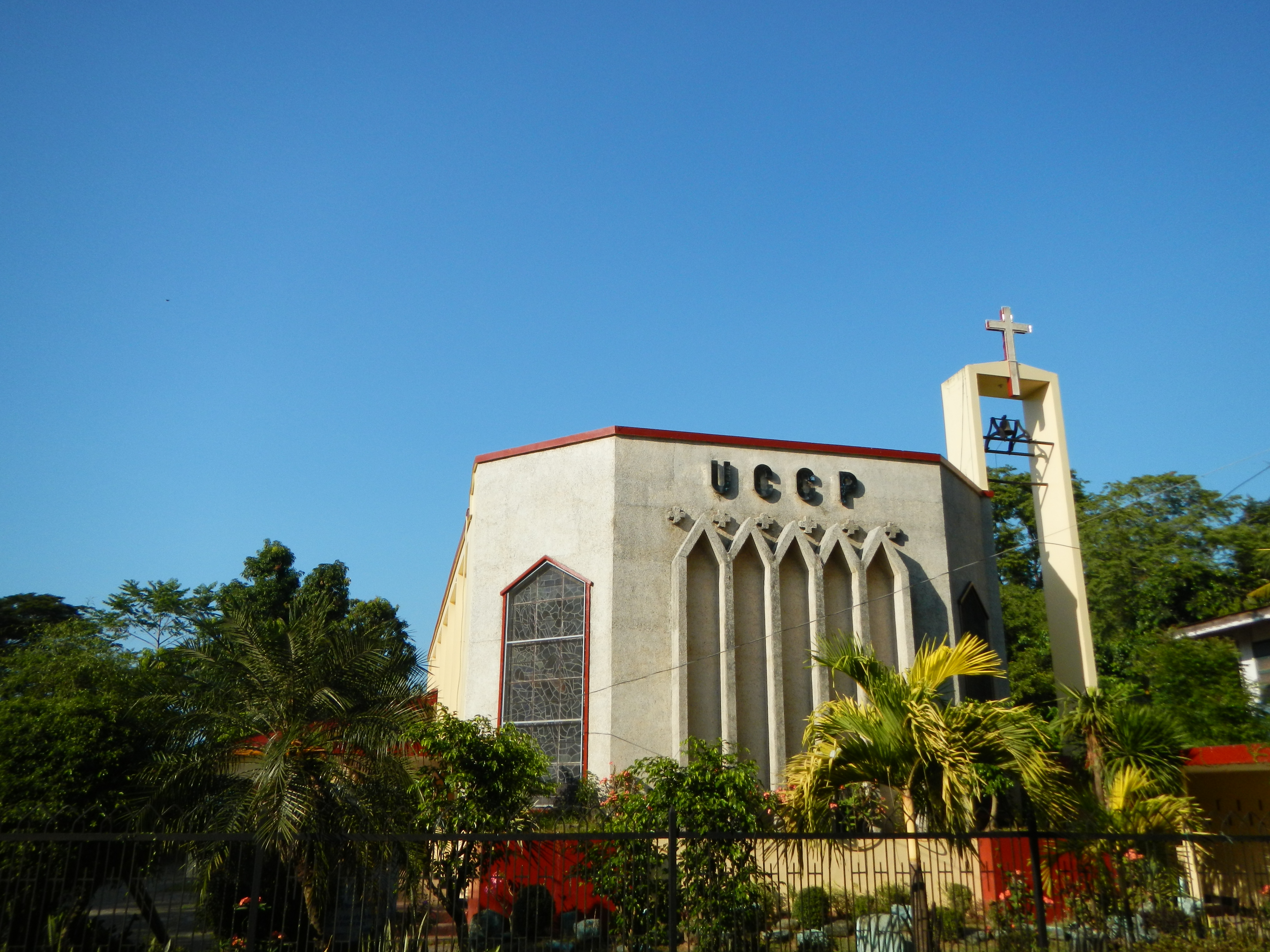
United Church of Christ in the Philippines in Caba

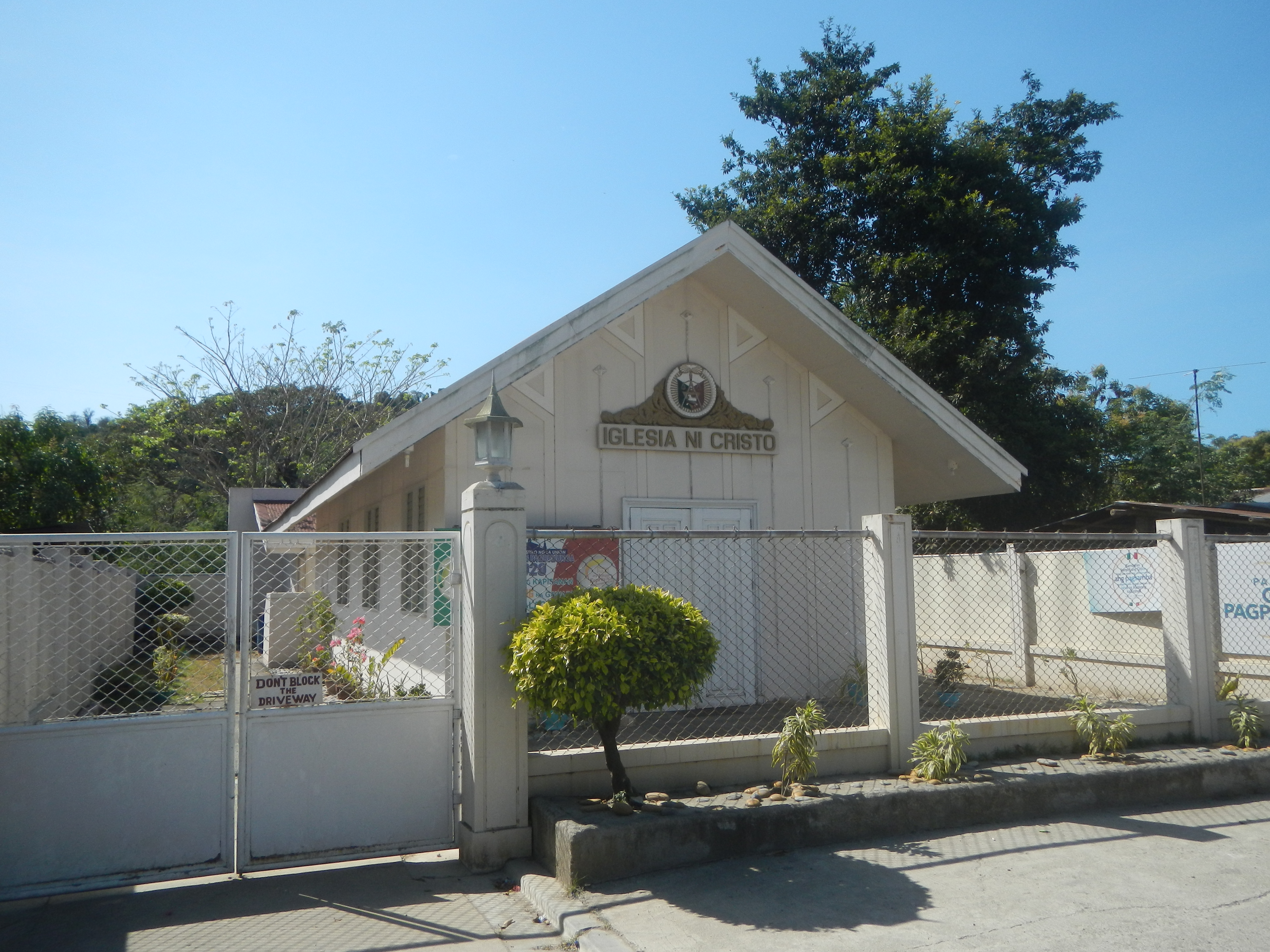
Iglesia ni Cristo in San Gregorio, Caba

Caba is predominantly Roman Catholic, though various other Christian denominations, including Iglesia ni Cristo, Protestant groups, and Jehovah's Witnesses, are also present. Smaller communities practicing Islam and Buddhism can also be found in the town.

- Assemblies of God (Poblacion Norte)
- Assemblies of God (San Jose)
- Assemblies of the First Born (Gana)
- Assemblies of the First Born (Juan Cartas)
- Assemblies of the First Born (Liquicia)
- Assemblies of the First Born (San Cornelio)
- Assemblies of the First Born (San Jose)
- Assemblies of the First Born (Sobredillo)
- Assemblies of the First Born (Urayong)
- Christ Centered Fellowship (Juan Cartas)
- Faith Gospel Mission Church/Yes for Jesus Crusaders International (Poblacion Norte)
- Iglesia Filipina Independiente (Poblacion Norte)
- Iglesia Ni Cristo (Gana)
- Jesus Christ The Glorious Savior International Ministry JCGSIM LU [Full Gospel Christian Church] (Poblacion Norte)
- Messengers of the Cross Bible College/Assemblies of the First Born Full Gospel Church (Poblacion Norte)
- Shinil Caba Christian Fellowship (Poblacion Norte)
- The Lord's Vineyard Baptist Church (Las-ud)
- United Church of Christ in the Philippines (Poblacion Norte)
- Words of Life Christian Ministries (Santiago Norte)

== Education ==
The Caba Schools District Office governs all educational institutions within the municipality. It oversees the management and operations of all private and public elementary and high schools.

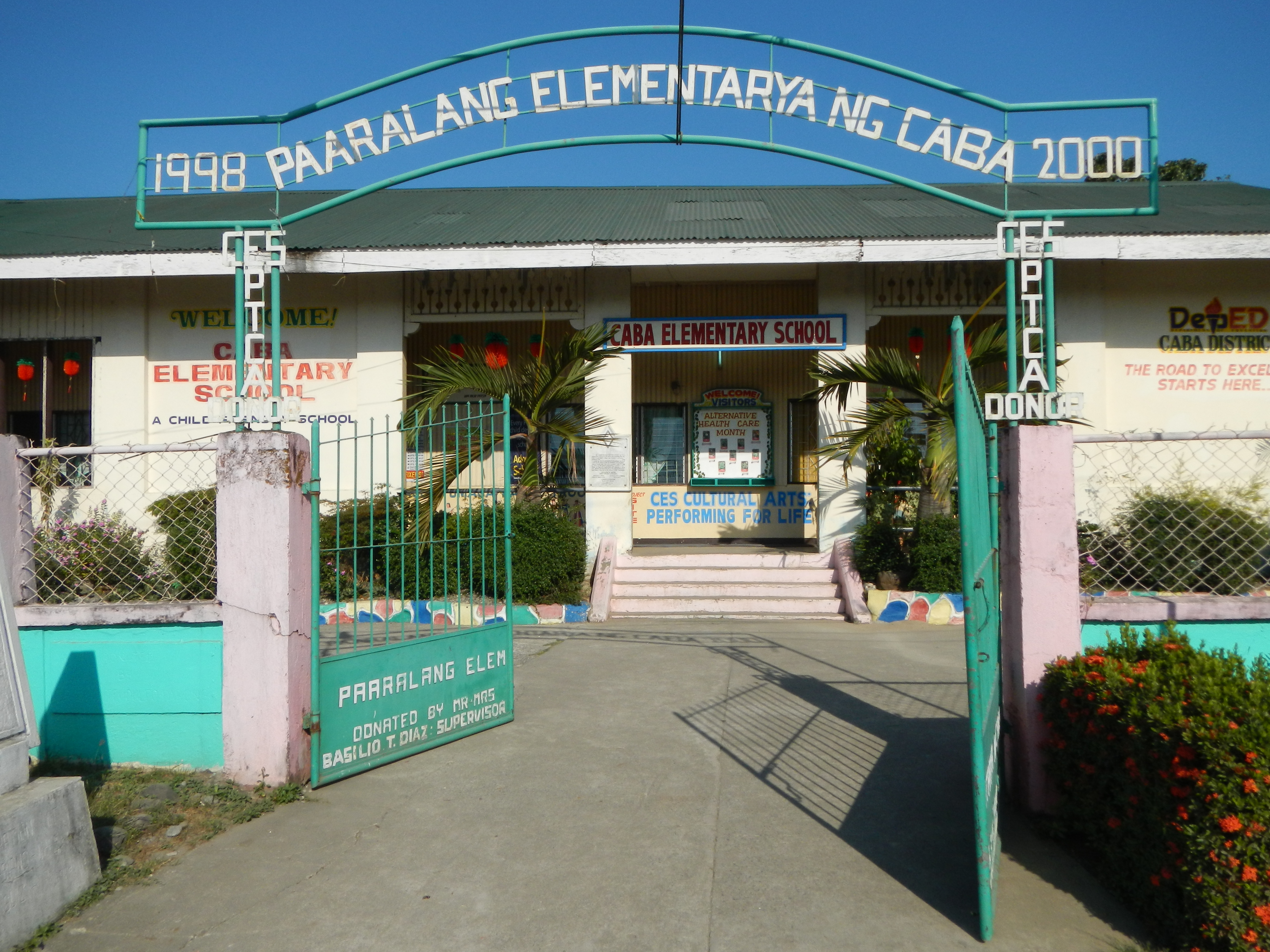
Caba Elementary School

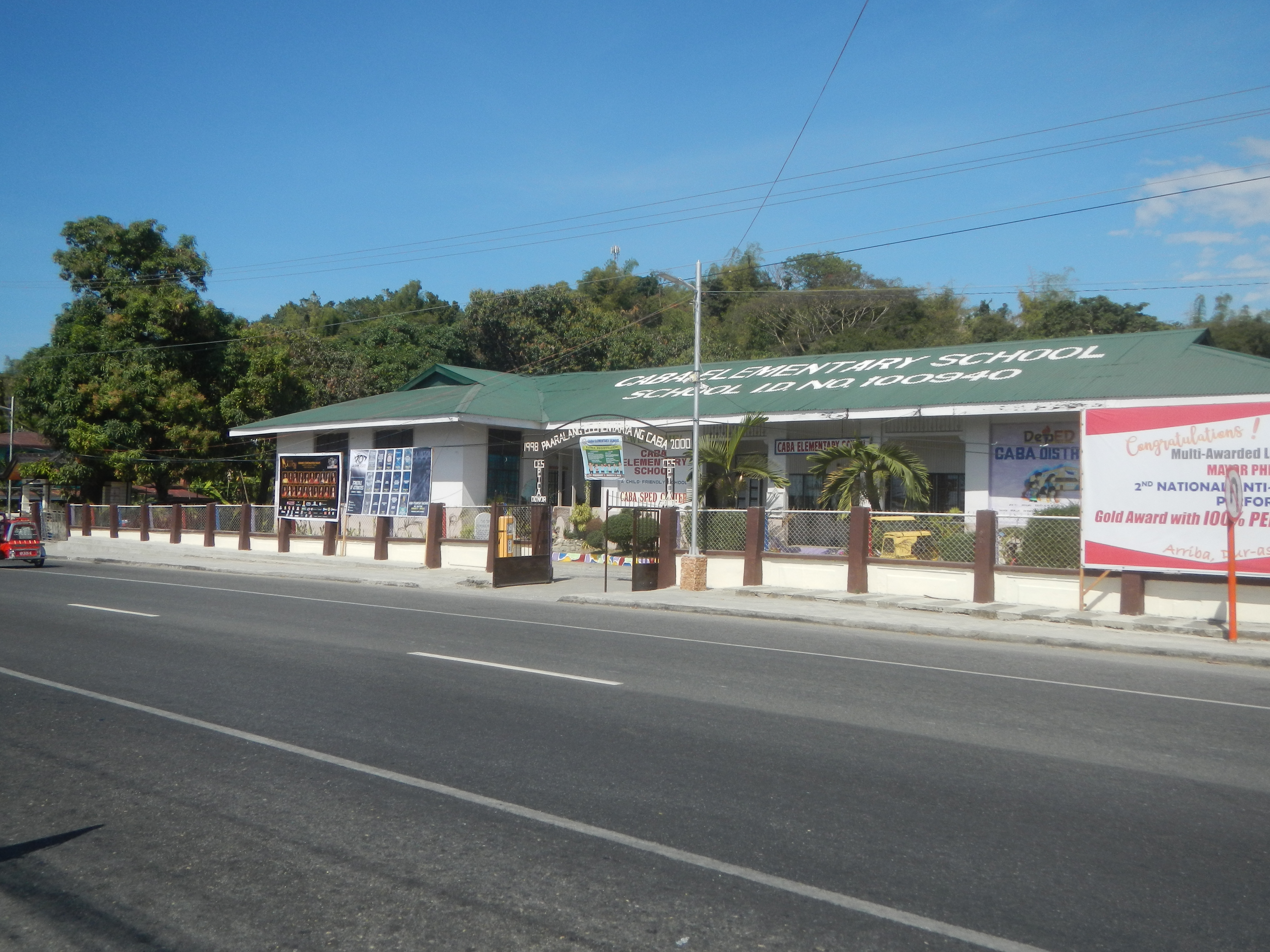
Caba National Highschool

In 2020, 24.59% had completed elementary school, 45.09% had completed high school, 9.38% were college undergraduates, and 15.10% held an academic degree. Among degree holders, 56.28% were female. 71.83% of post-baccalaureate students were female. The literacy rate in Caba was 98.97%, with a slightly higher rate for males (50.69%) than females (49.31%).

The municipality has 11 public elementary schools and 6 public secondary schools providing education to children and young adults in the area.

=== Primary and elementary schools ===
- Caba Central Elementary School
- Doña Antonia Maglaya Elementary School
- Jesus Cares Christian Academy
- Labbon Elementary School
- Liquicia Integrated School
- San Carlos Elementary School
- San Cornelio Elementary School
- San Gregorio Elementary School
- San Jose Elementary School
- Santiago Sur Integrated School
- St. John the Baptist Learning Center
- UCCP Nursery Kindergarten School (Caba)
- Upper Tumapoc Elementary School
- Wenceslao Elementary School

=== Secondary schools ===
- Caba National High School
- Liquicia Integrated School
- San Gregorio National High School
- San Jose National High School
- Santiago Sur Integrated School
- Wenceslao National High School
- La Union Standard Academy

== Economy ==
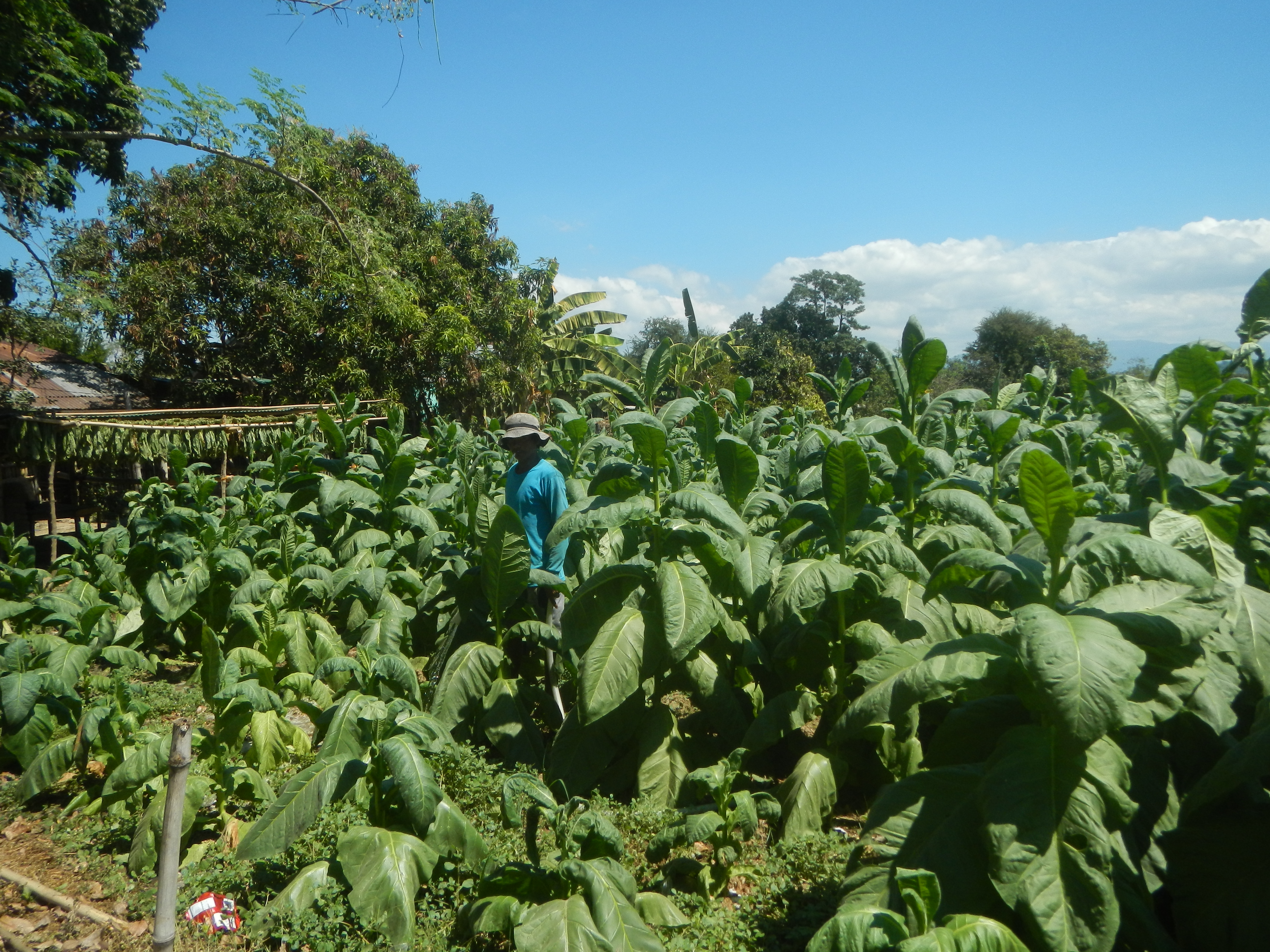
Tobacco farmer in Santiago Norte

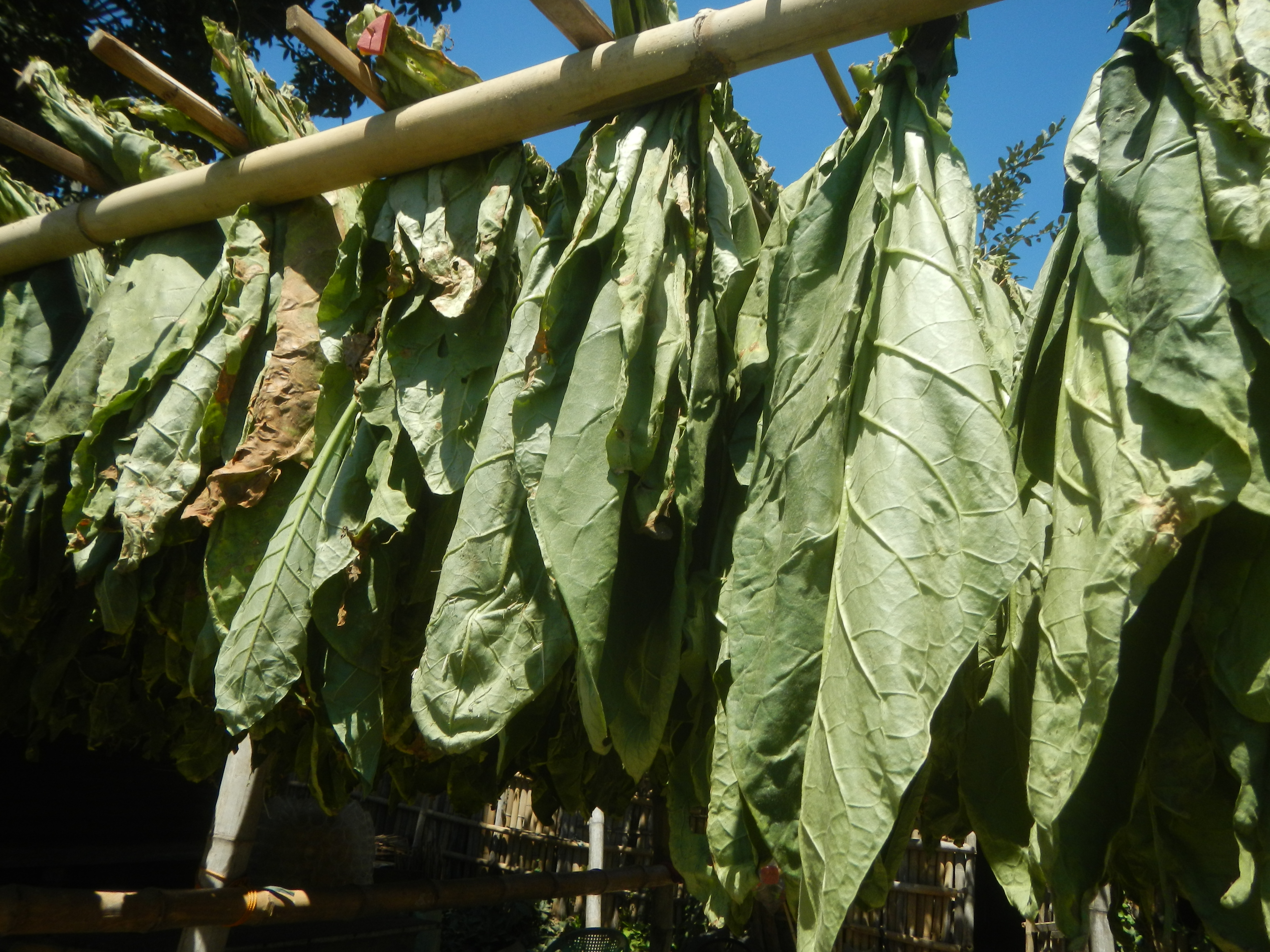
Air-curing of harvested tobacco leaves

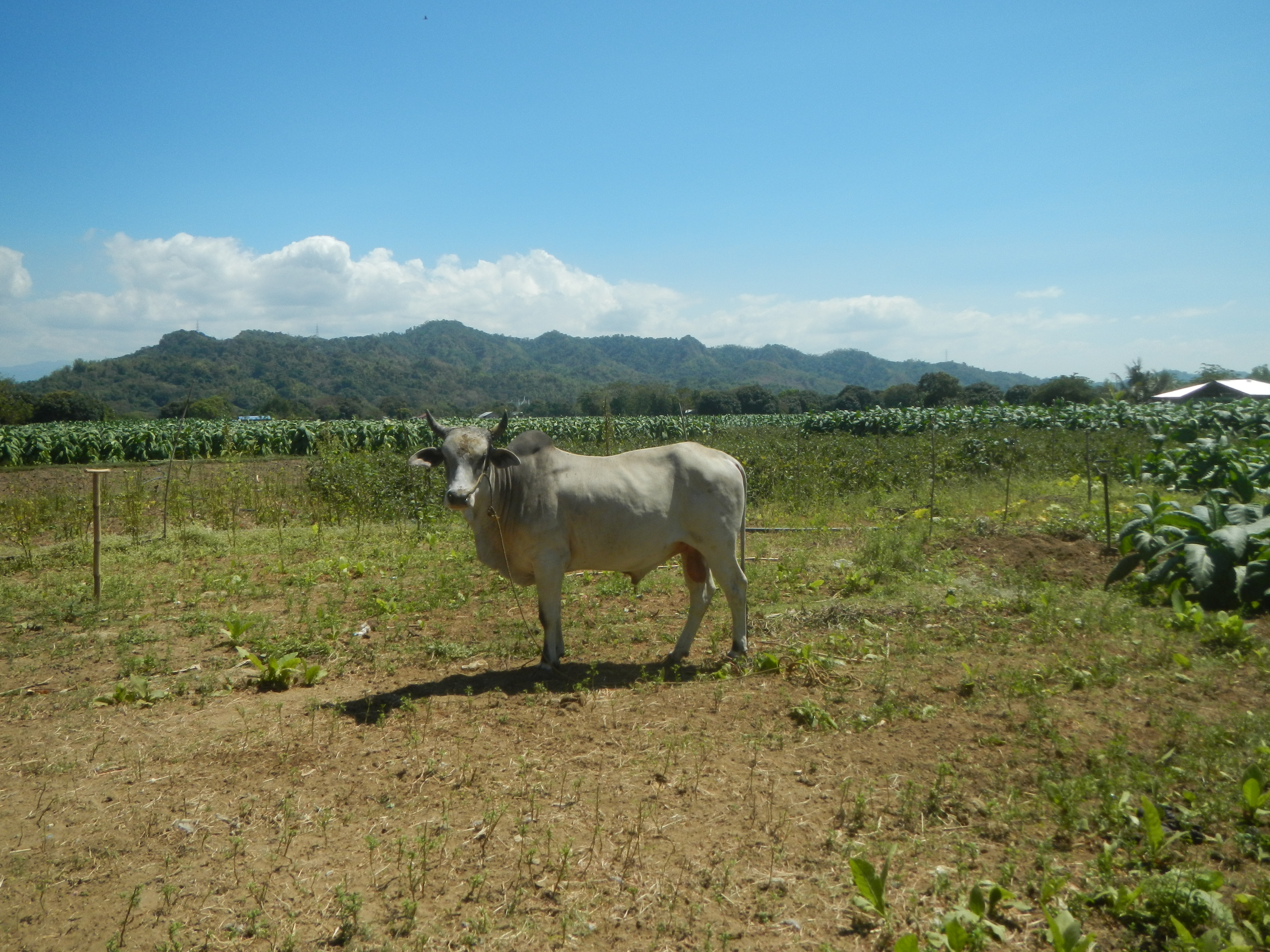
Livestock

The economy of Caba is primarily driven by agriculture, fishing, and small-scale industries, with a growing emphasis on local businesses and tourism. Agriculture serves as a cornerstone of the town's livelihood, with major crops including rice, Virginia tobacco, root crops, corn, and a variety of fruits and vegetables. Mangoes and grapes stand out as the town’s flagship agricultural products, highly valued for both local consumption and trade.

Livestock farming also plays a significant role in supporting the local economy. The town raises poultry, carabaos, goats, and swine, which provide a stable source of income for many residents. Poultry production, in particular, is a notable contributor, supplying fresh meat and eggs to local markets, while carabaos are often utilized as work animals in farming and a source of milk and meat.

Fishing also plays a vital role in Caba’s economy. The South China Sea (Lingayen Gulf), with its abundant marine resources, supports a thriving fishing industry. Local fisherfolk catch a wide variety of seafood, which is sold fresh or processed into products that reach neighboring markets, providing a significant boost to the local economy.

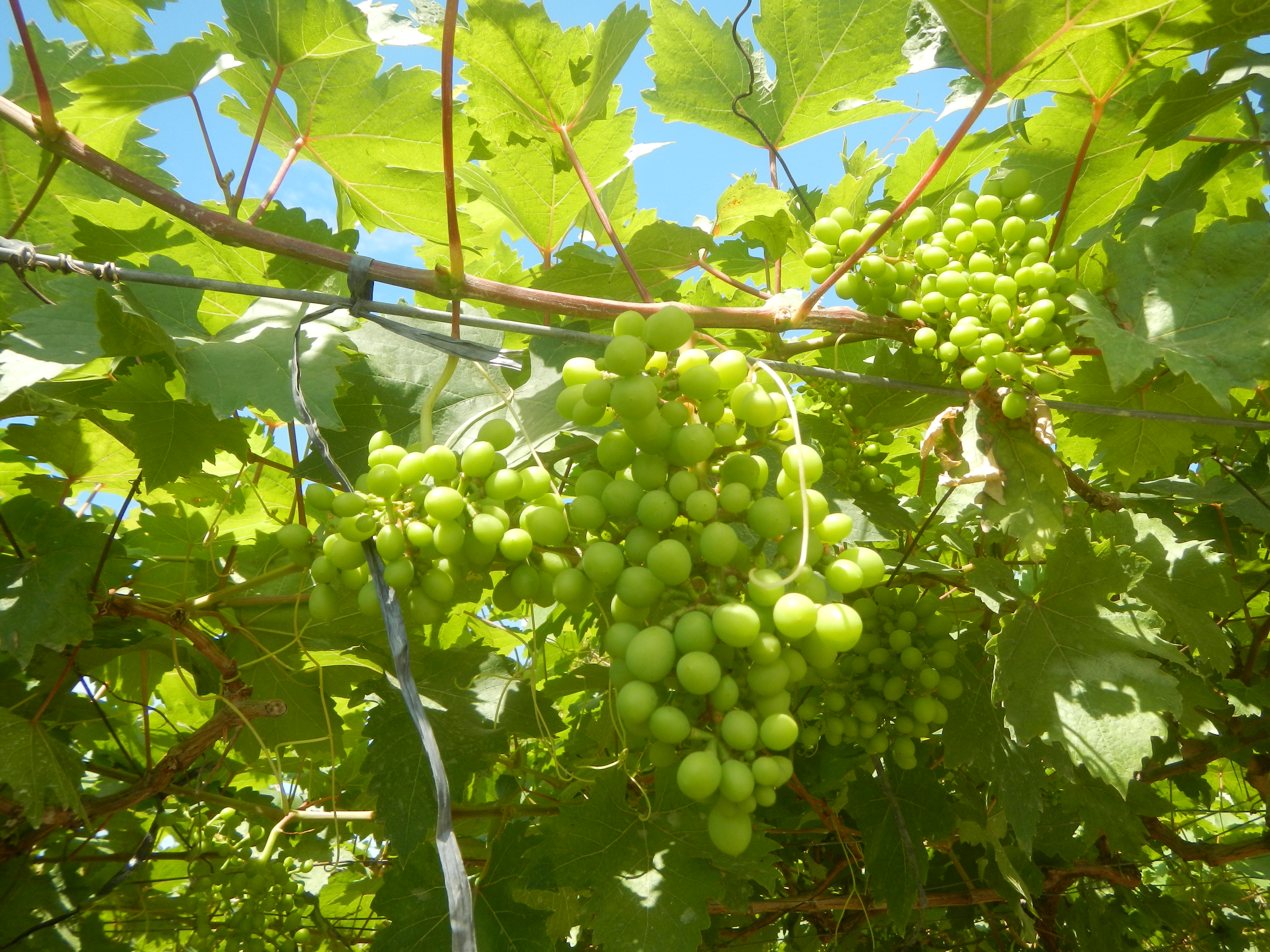
Vineyard in Wenceslao

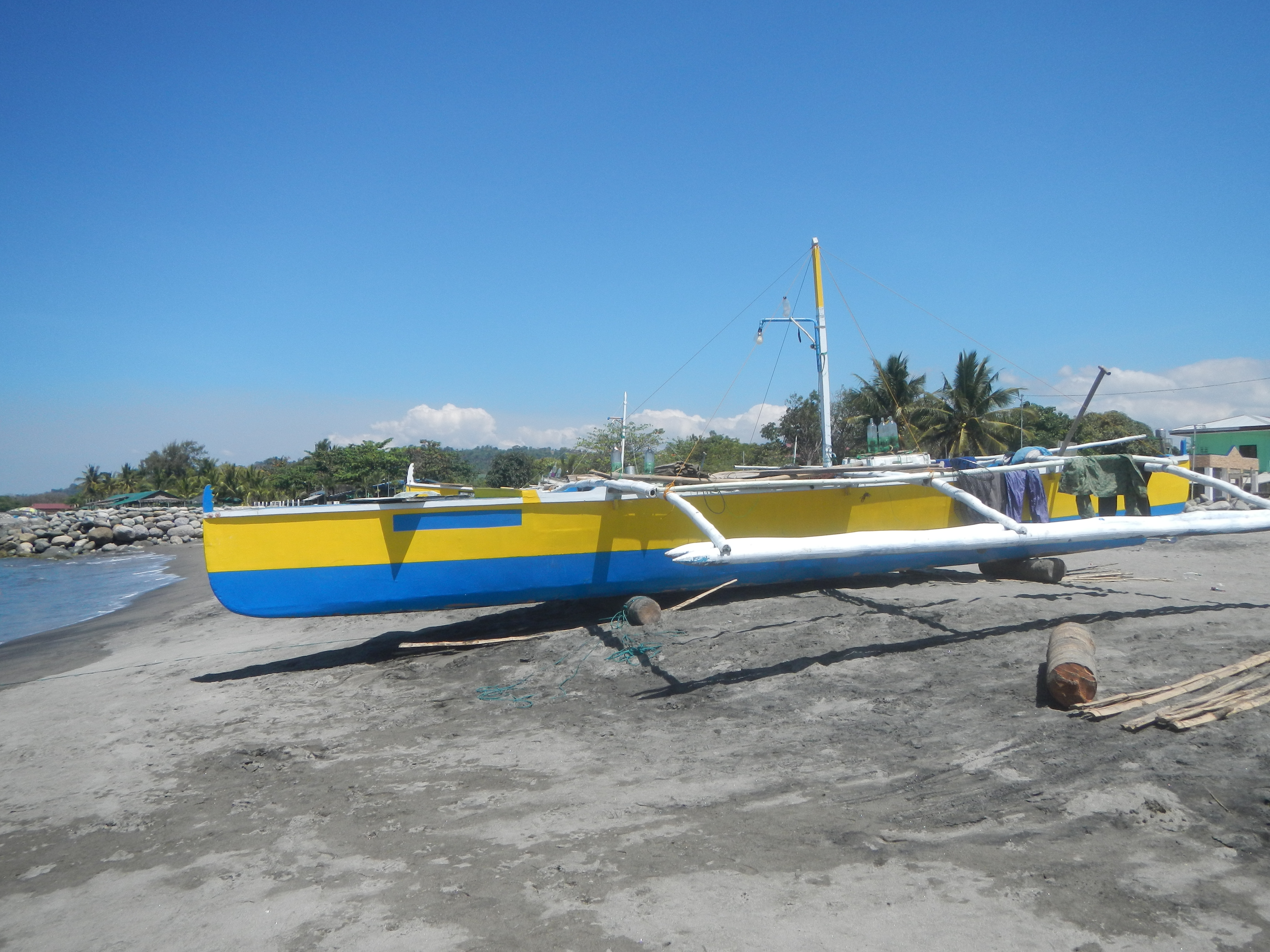
Fishing boat in San Carlos beach

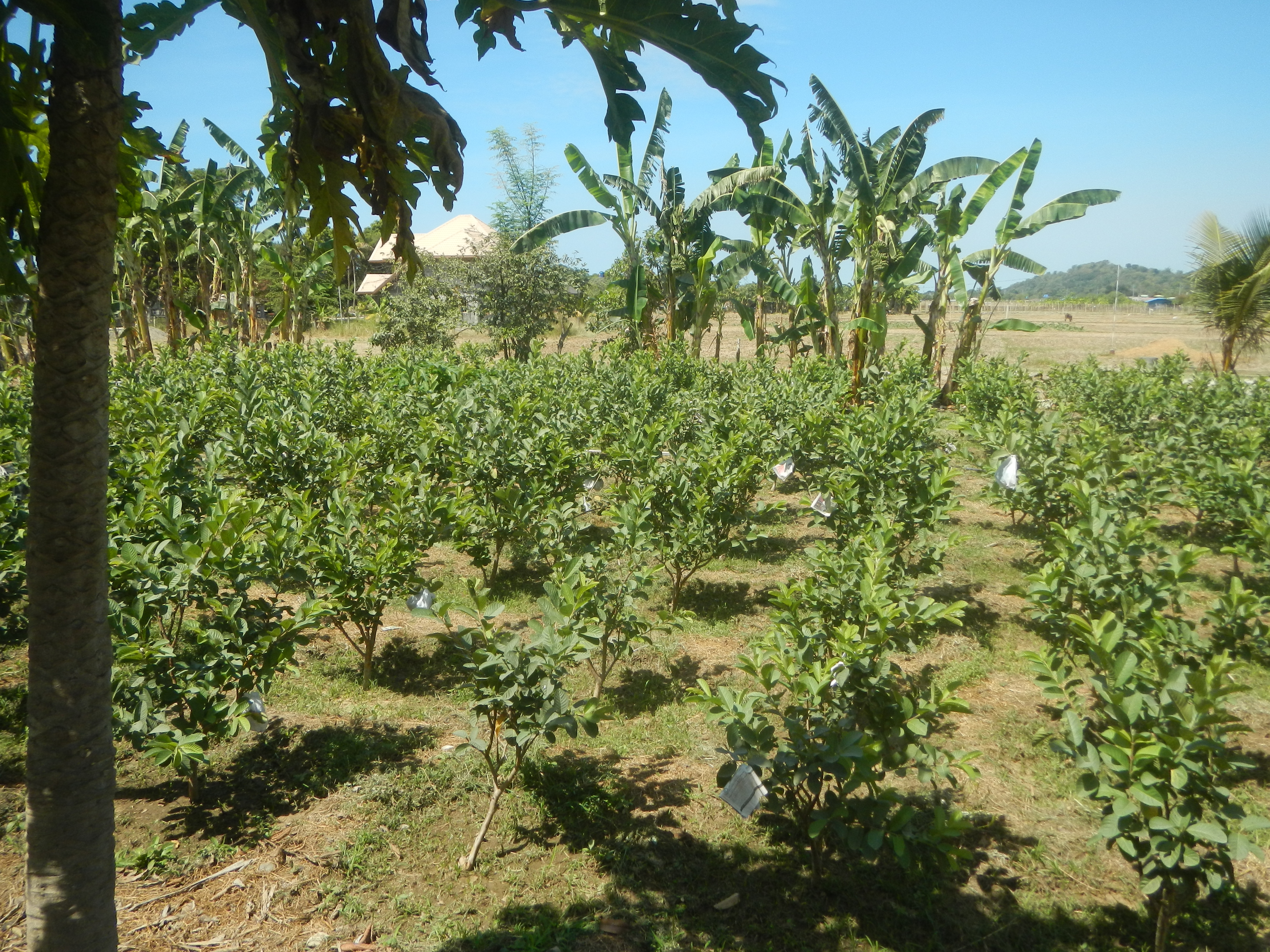
Guapple fruit farming in Wenceslao

Caba is equally well-known for its vibrant cottage industries. The town has built a reputation for bamboo craftsmanship, producing high-quality furniture, baskets, installation art, and even traditional bamboo houses. Another hallmark of Caba's industry is the production of "bugguong padas," a locally famous fermented fish delicacy. Other thriving industries include woodcarving, dried fish production, and weaving, which preserve the town’s rich cultural heritage while contributing to economic growth.

Poverty incidence of Caba (%)

Source: Philippine Statistics Authority

== Government ==
=== Local government ===
Just as the national government, the municipal government of Caba, is divided into three branches: executive, legislative, and judiciary. The judicial branch is administered solely by the Supreme Court of the Philippines. The LGUs have control of the executive and legislative branches.

The executive branch is composed of the mayor and the barangay captain for the barangays.Local Government Code of the Philippines, Book III, Department of the Interior and Local Government official website.

The legislative branch is composed of the Sangguniang Bayan (town assembly), Sangguniang Barangay (barangay council), and the Sangguniang Kabataan for the youth sector.

The seat of Government is vested upon the Mayor and other elected officers who hold office at the Caba Town Hall. The Sanguniang Bayan is the center of legislation, stationed in Caba Legislative Building.

=== Elected officials ===
Members of the Municipal Council (2022-2025)
Position	Name
Congressman	Dante S. Garcia
Governor	Raphaelle Veronica A. Ortega-David
Mayor	Donna R. Crispino
Vice-Mayor	Ronnie P. Mangaser
Councilors	Conrado A. Vito
Councilors	Arleen G. Crispino
Councilors	Maribel B. Runes
Councilors	Igmedio L. Dugenia
Councilors	Don Mar P. Dugenia
Councilors	Charlyn F. Reyes
Councilors	Crisogono D. Hulipas Jr.
Councilors	Imelda D. Vallejo

== Tourism ==
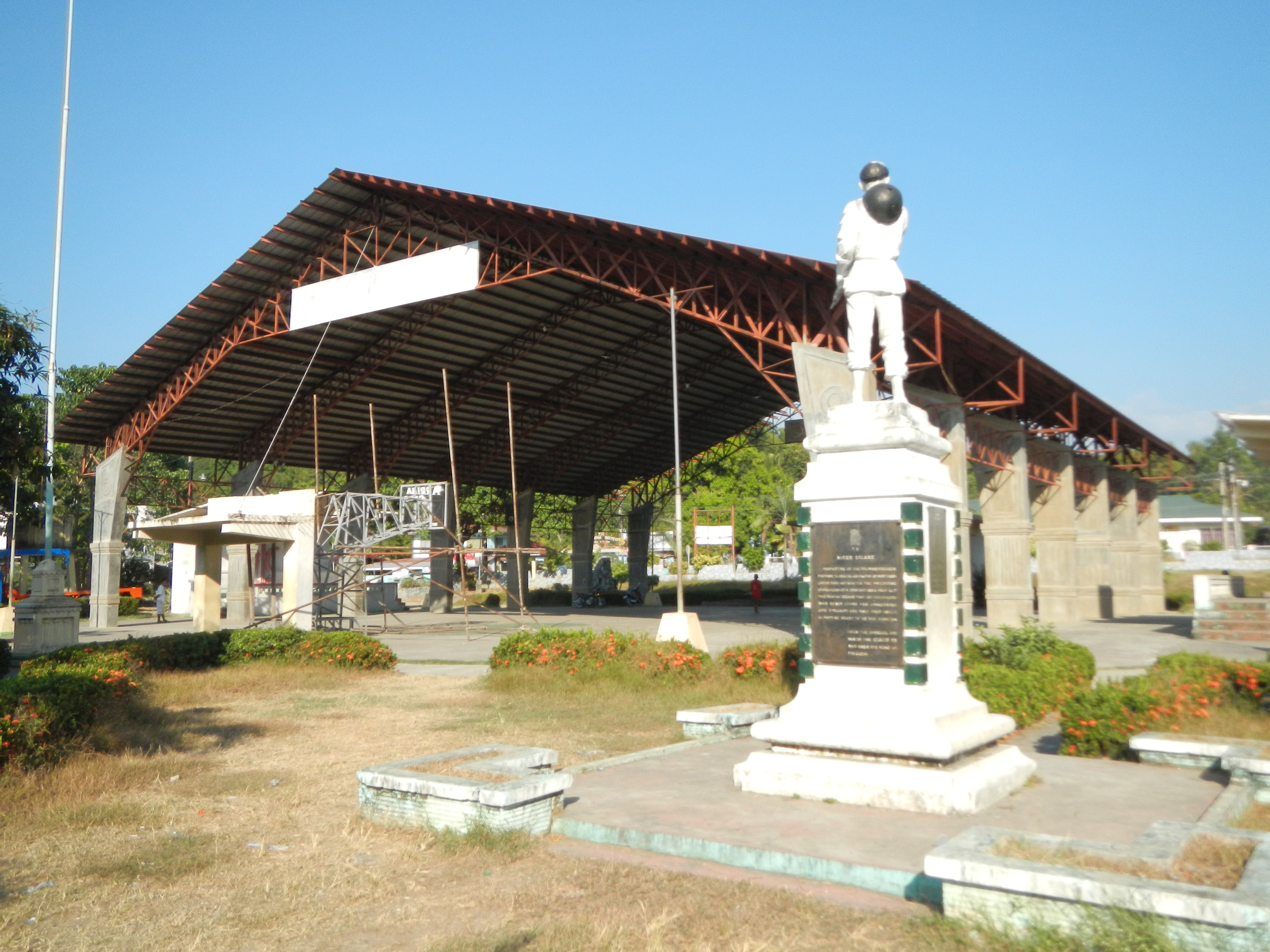
Silang Monument and the Caba covered court, Auditorium

- Diego Silang's monument is erected in the middle of the Town Plaza.
- President Elpidio Quirino's stone monument on the other hand was placed at Barangay Gana highway. Quirino taught in Caba as an elementary public school teacher.
- Ripe and green mangoes, Bagoong, Padas, and Alamang are the town's products that are sold in stalls along the Gana roads.
- Bamboo furniture is one of the prime business of the residents.
- Sobredillo barrio: one can find the 56 Mortar (weapon) (bombs, 81 millimeter each of Japanese soldiers, World War II), were unearthed near Mayor Clyde Crispino's house in Barangay Sobredillo including a 1-high old jar, for serving offerings in religious rites.

Caba celebrates on April 15 to 18, the town fiesta and on June 24, the Feast of Saint John the Baptist.

- Caba holds its Paskua Ti Umili every December.

=== Caba beach ===
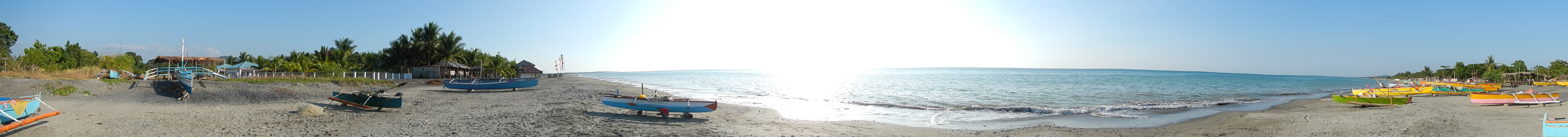
Panorama of Caba's beach

Caba’s beaches are located along Lingayen Gulf.

== Gallery ==
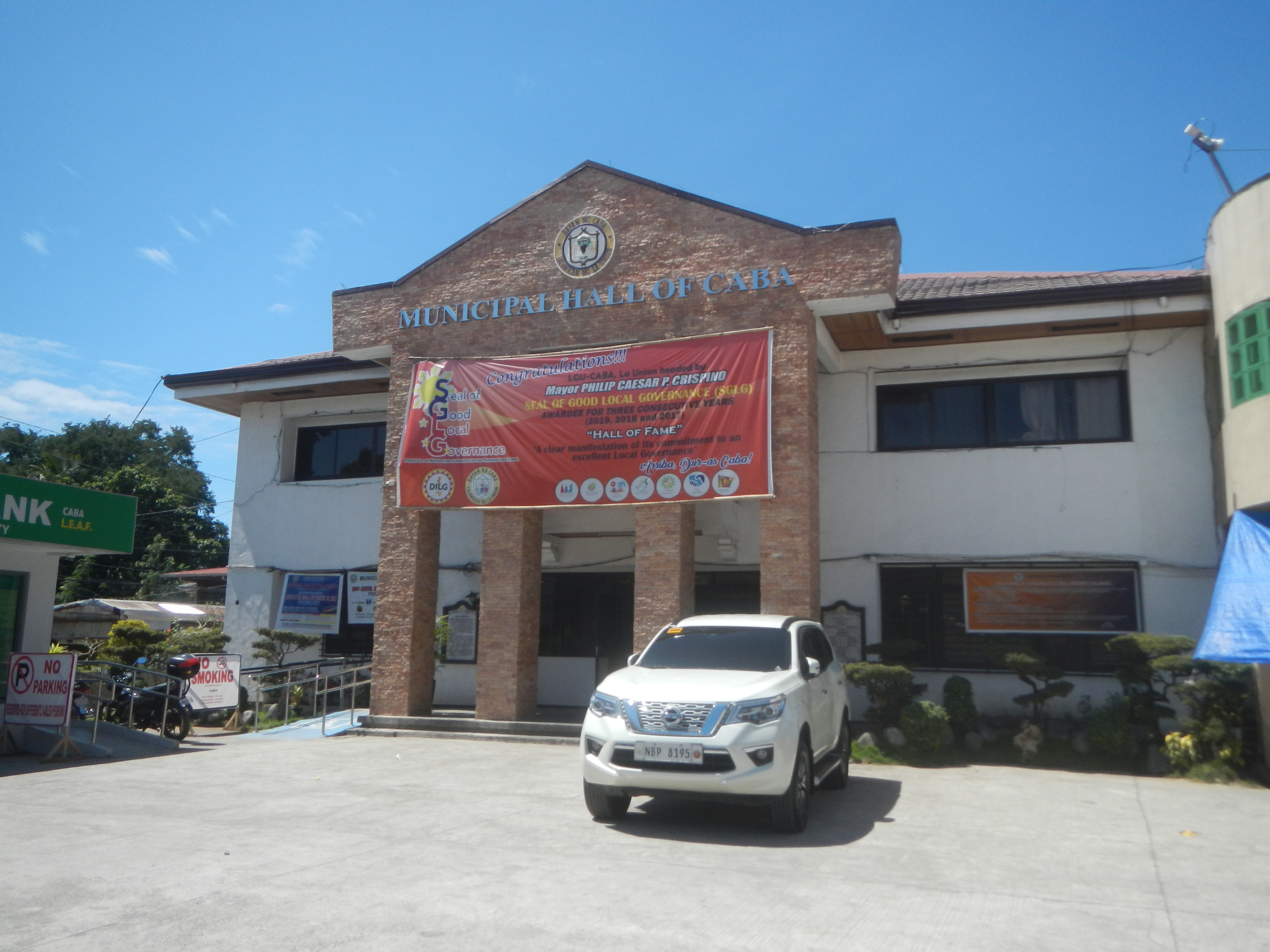
Municipal Hall

Diego Silang Statue

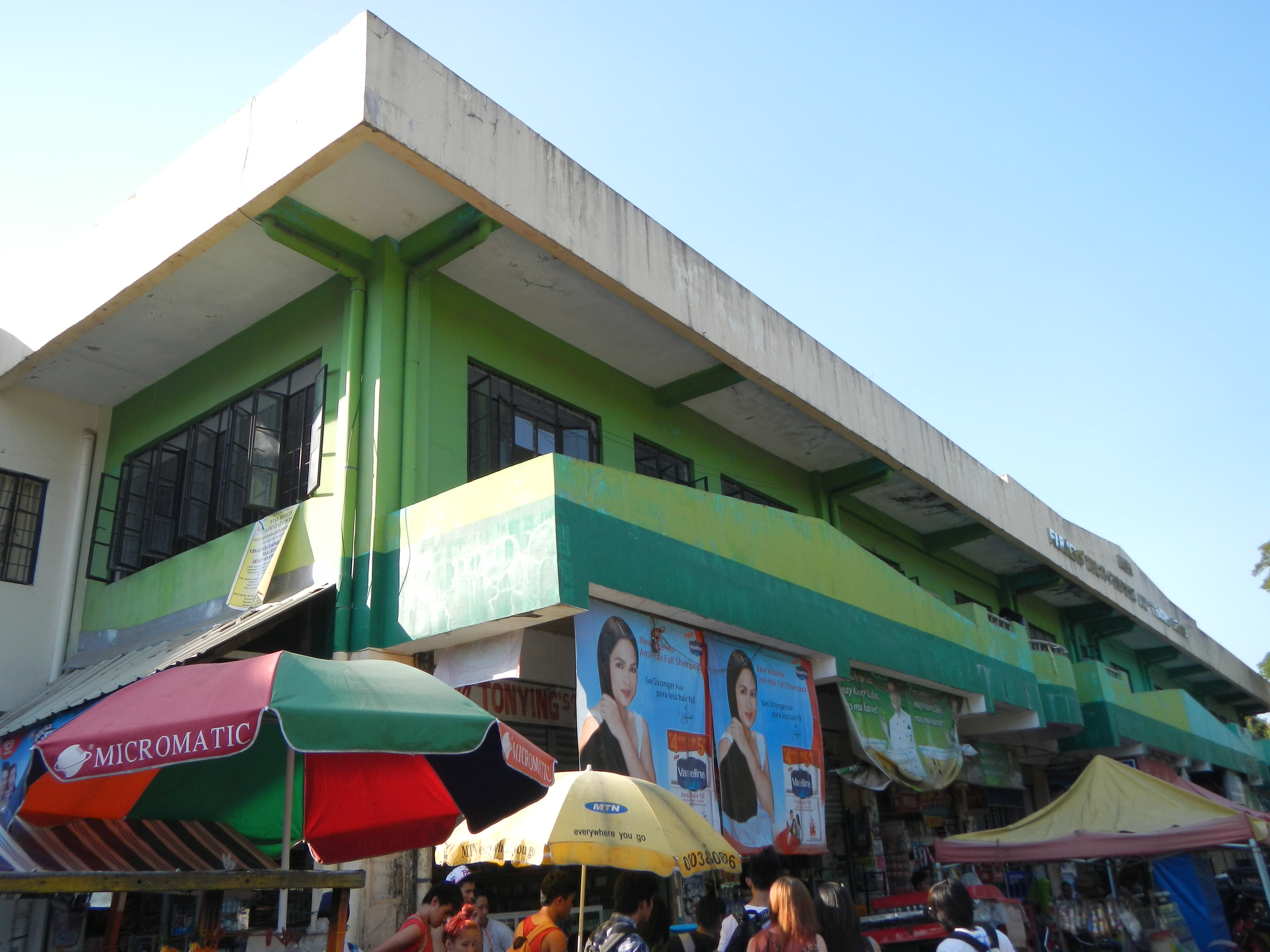
Farmers' Market Building

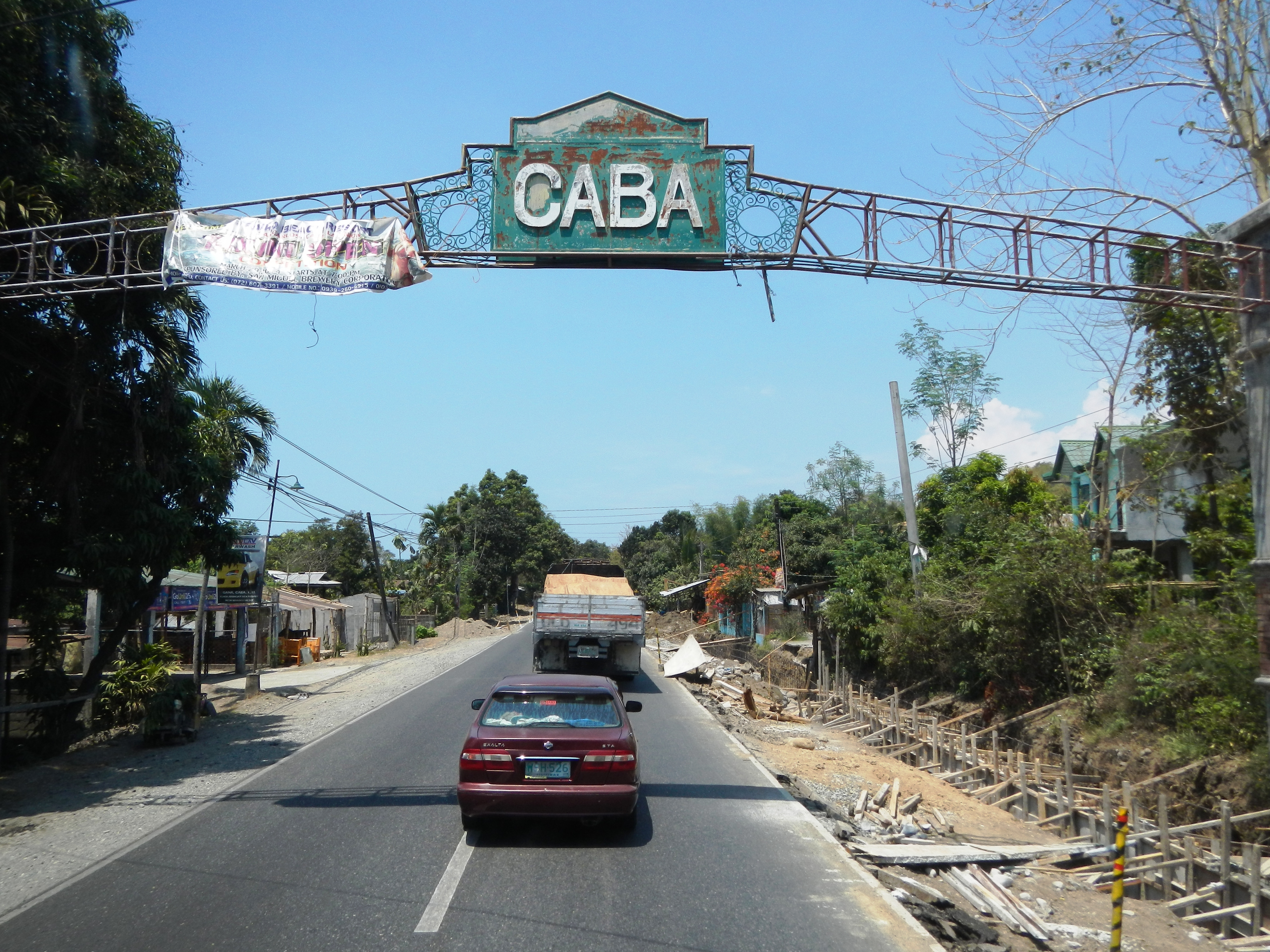
Caba welcome arch

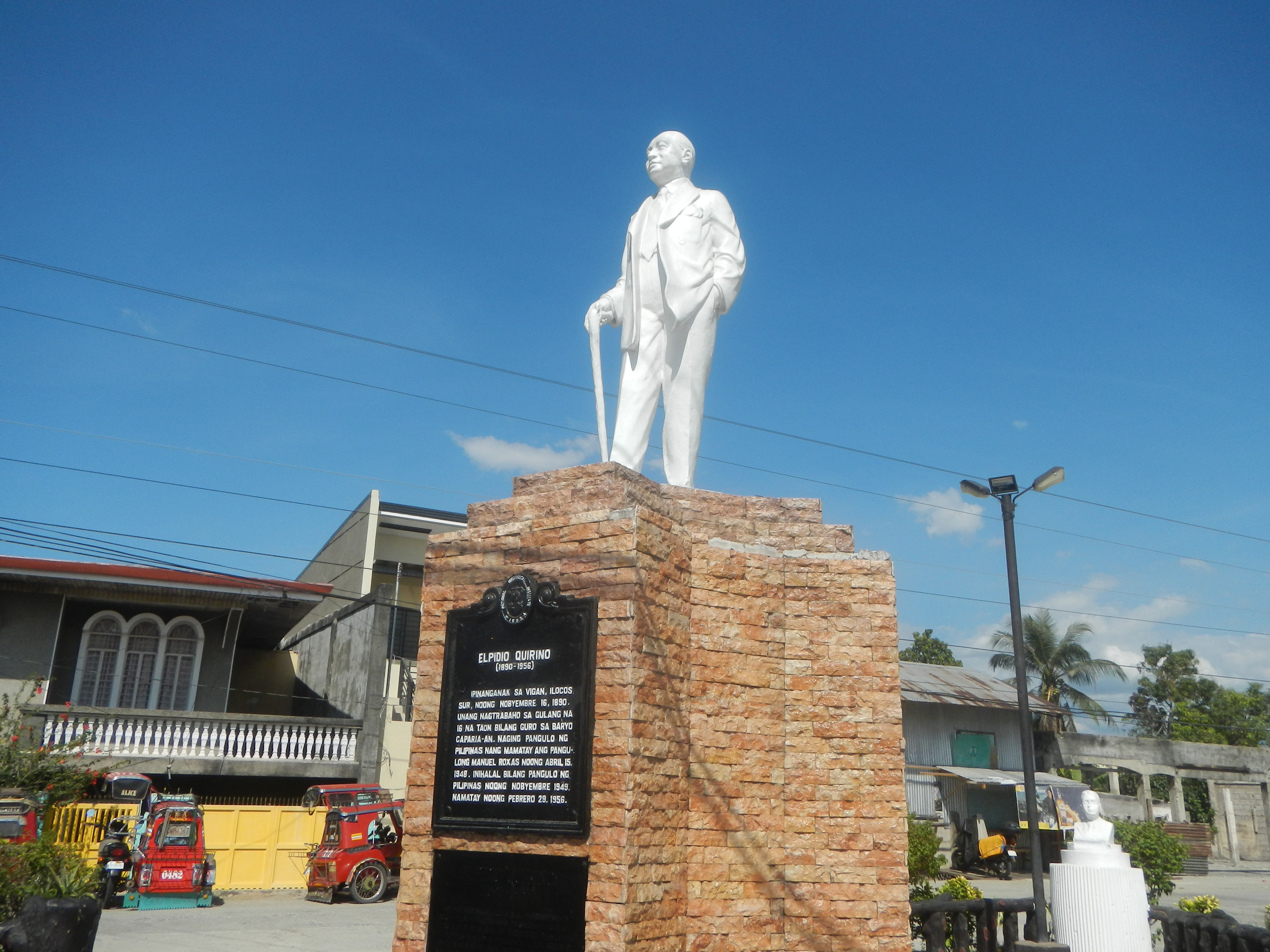
President Elpidio Rivera Quirino Monument

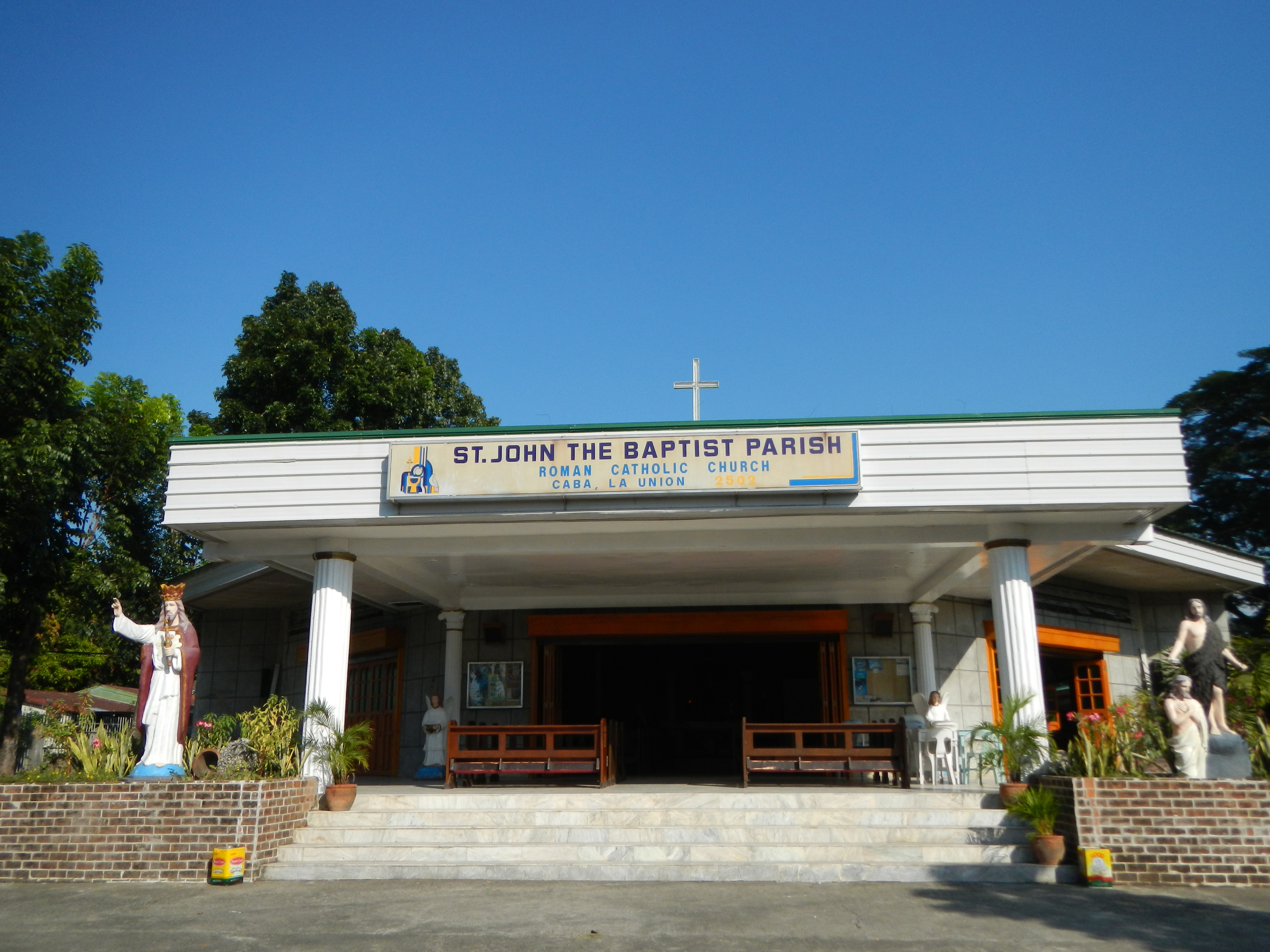
Saint John the Baptist Parish Church

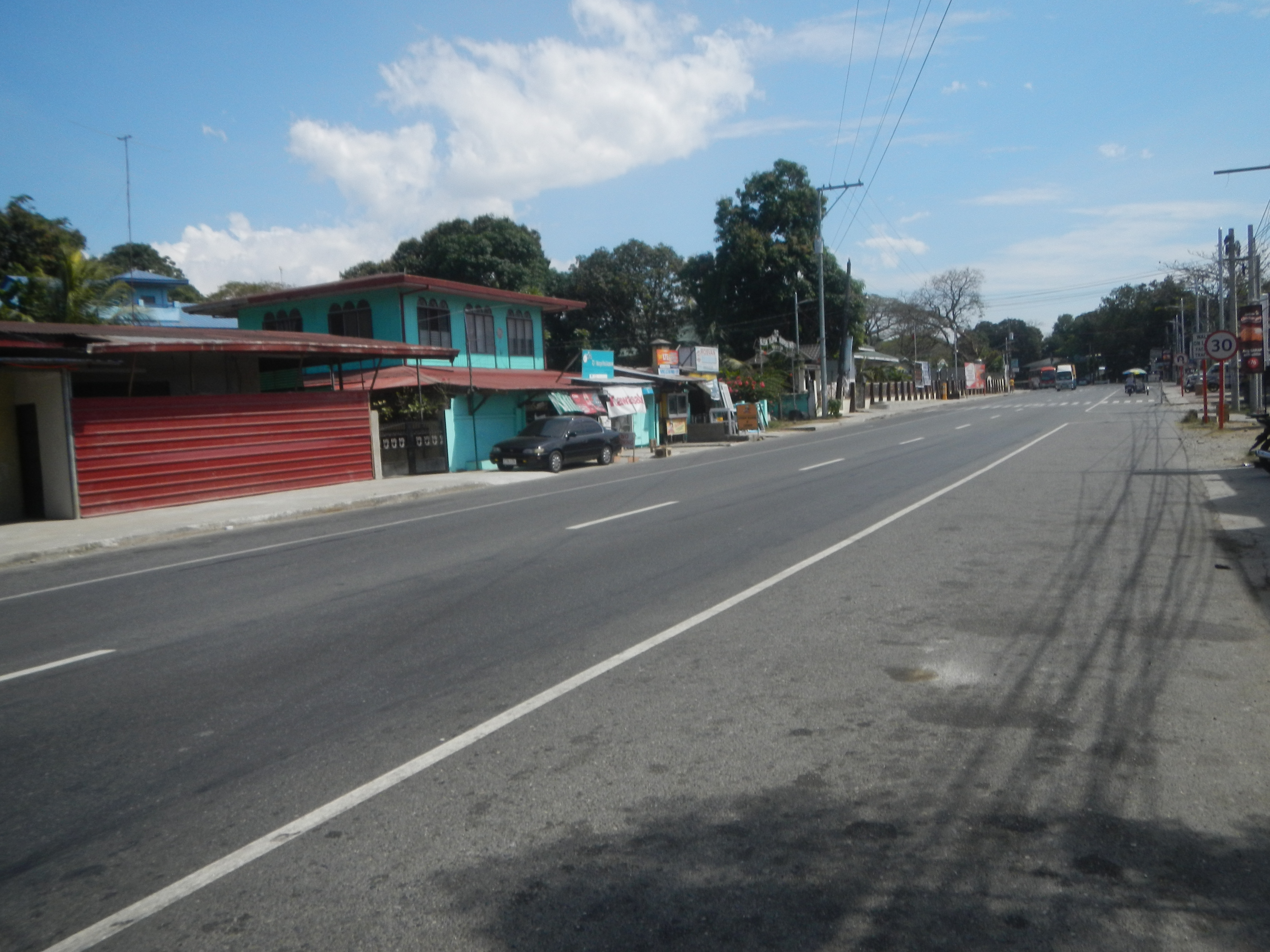
National Highway

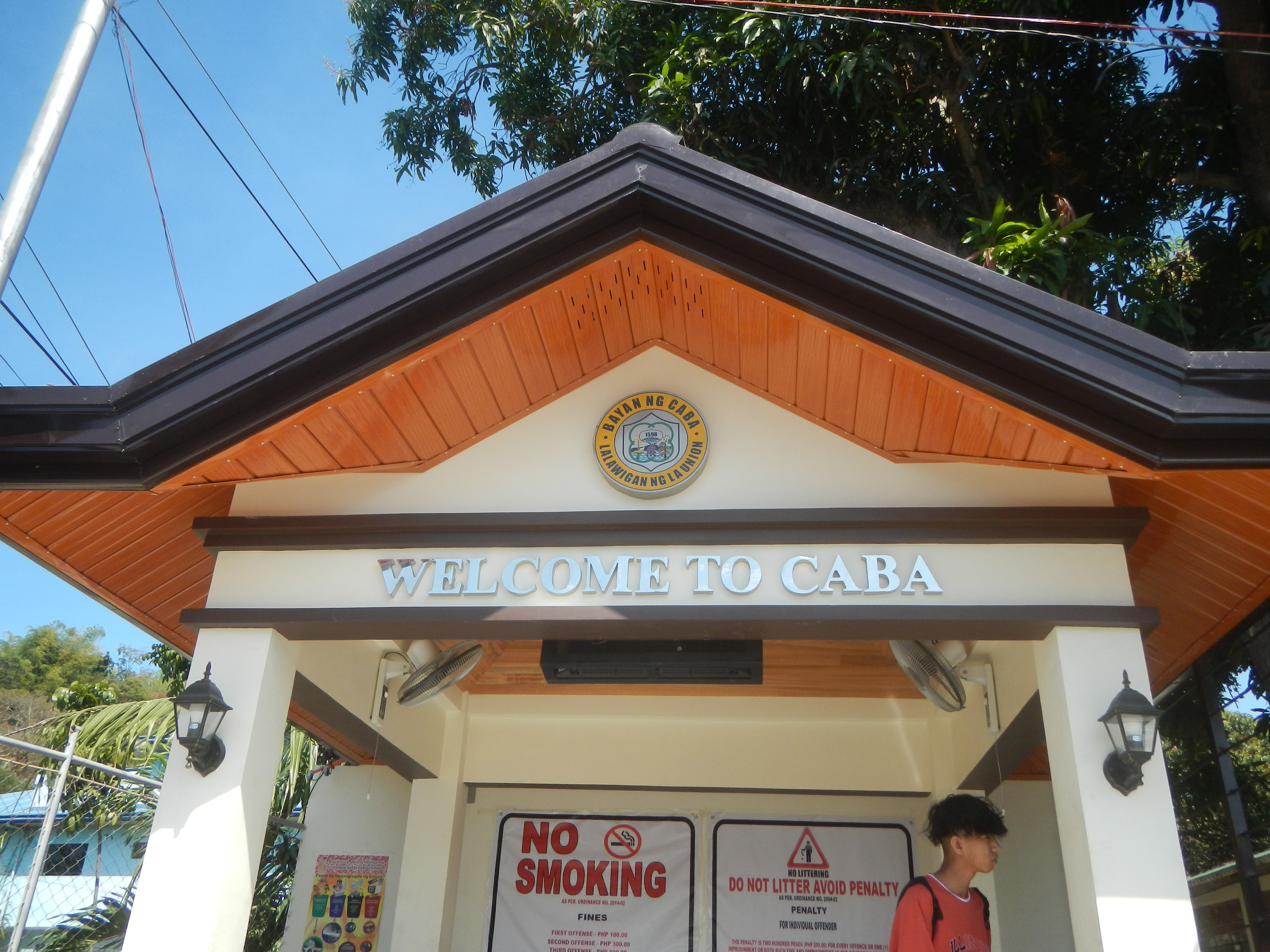
Waiting Shed

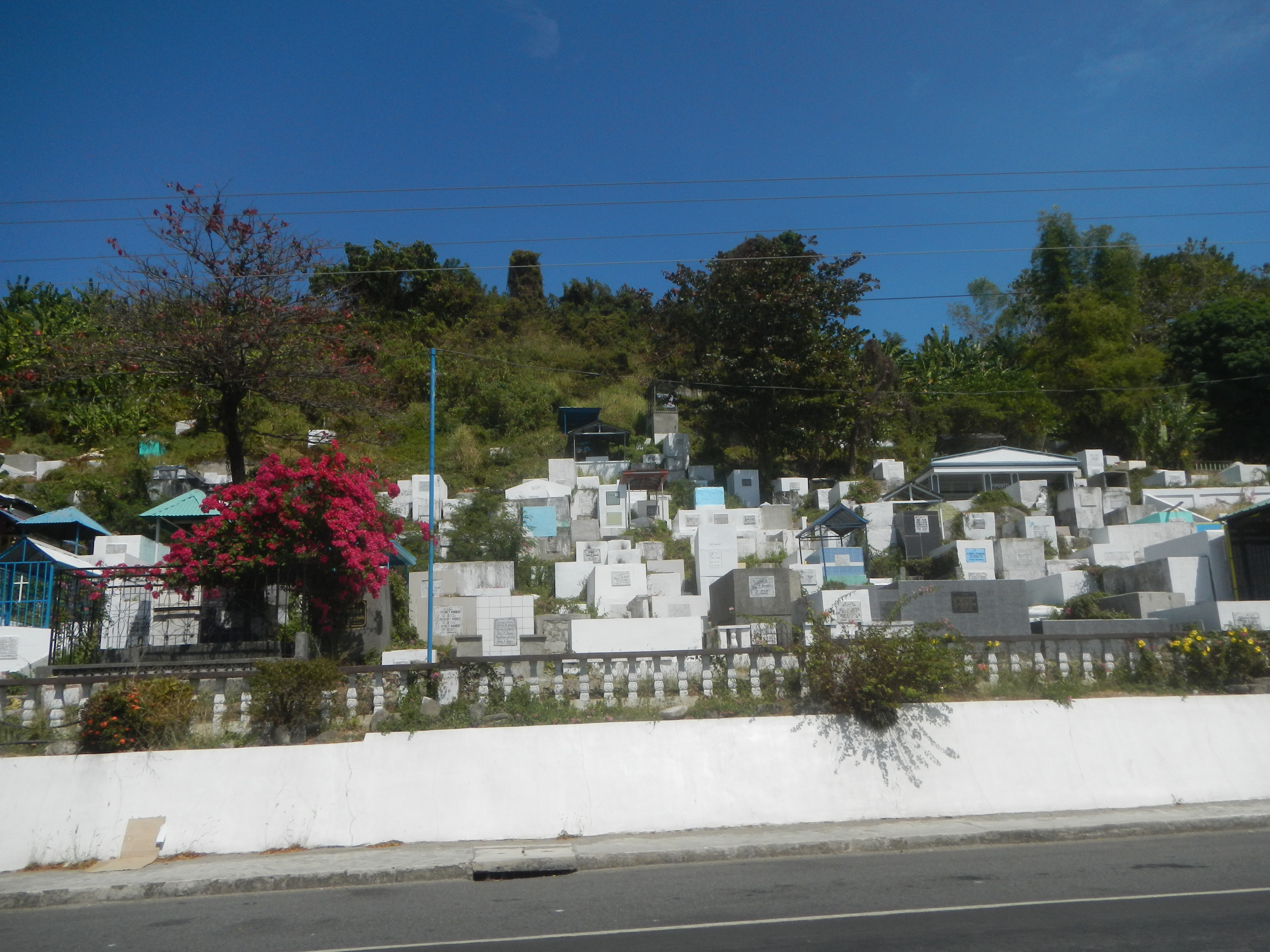
Public Cemetery
