= Pedro Almazán =

- Born: San Nicolas, Ilocos, Captaincy General of the Philippines
- Died: 1661; Ilocos, Captaincy General of the Philippines
- Cause of death: Died in fighting
- Known for: First Ilocano Revolt

Don Pedro Almazán, a wealthy leader from the present-day Ilocos Norte, led the first Ilocano revolt. With his effort, the Ilocanos turned out to be the first ethnic group outside Manila to rebel against the Spanish authority.

== Plans ==
Pedro Almazán was angered by the severe injustice of the Spaniards. In protest against Spanish despotism and to expel the colonizers from his domain, Almazán planned of staging armed revolution. In preparation to his unstoppable scheme, he transformed a certain part under his house into a secret dungeon with a repository of shackles. He intended to chain all the Spanish soldiers and friars in the dungeon and would not release them forever. He was joined in his plot by Juan Magsanop, a leader from Bacarra, Bangui. To strengthen their scheme, Almazan suggested the marriage between his son and Magsanop's daughter.

== Coronation ==
Almazán was more convinced with his plans with news from Lieutenant Andres Malong's successful uprising in Pangasinan, which was now self-proclaimed king of the area by December 1660. When a mutiny ensued in La Union, a huge contingent of Spaniards from Ilocos went to support their besieged comrades. The Augustinian Friar José Arias, who was renowned for his viciousness, joined the party. The absence of Arias was seen by Almazán and Magsanop as the best opportunity for their brood's wedding, which was only a cover for their rebellion. And so, they set it for the end of the month. They sent to fellowmen in Laoag led by Gaspar Cristobal and the latter agreed to Almazán's plans for rebellion. Chieftains and warriors of Kalinga and the Isnegs of Cagayan also joined Almazán's party. They pledged their allegiance and full support to their newly installed king. The entire community jubilantly waved banners as they extensively celebrated the coronation of Almazán as King of Ilocos.

== Revolt ==
On January 31, 1661, the Dominican friar of Clavería, José Santa María, was distracted by a commotion outside the church. A frightened Spanish soldier rushed in and reported to the priest that a furious mob was causing the commotion. Ignoring the soldier, he went out of the church, only seeing himself caught up by the mob. He was beheaded after being attacked with knives.

The next day, as nine friars, including Arias, were celebrating in Narvacan, for the suppression of a big group of Zambal fighters, another aggression erupted in northern Ilocos. Despite the looming danger, no amount of dissuasion by his peers prevented Arias from hurrying back to Bacarra. At his arrival, he met people shouting Almazán as their King and rushed to get the friar but to no avail. Juan Boaya, one of the mutineers, agreed to help in the silent departure of Arias. He told the servants to take the friar to Laoag right away. The rebels, however, caught up with the friar. The warriors beheaded Arias and brought his severed head to Magsanop. Magsanop immediately delivered the head to Almazán and gave the King an account of the incident. Cristobal and all who participated in the insurrection were fetched for the celebration.

== Death ==
The Spanish authorities sent Lorenzo Arqueros of Ilocos to wipe out Almazán and his men. Arqueros' troop consisted of a few Spaniards and more than a thousand native men, mostly collaborators. As Almazán and a few of his men were waiting for the arrival of a large number of supporters from Southern Ilocos, Arqueros and his troops staged a sudden attack and snatched from Almazán the opportunity to fortify his kingdom. Almazán and his men engaged in a running battle and had to gradually retreat to the forest. With the guidance of some native collaborators, the Spaniards trailed Almazán. Magsanop, who was caught up by Arqueros, decided to kill himself. Although greatly outnumbered by the enemy, Almazán's remaining troops continued fighting. In desperation, Almazán rode on his horse and courageously fought the Spaniards. Almazán was hanged at the town plaza. With the two leaders dead, the remaining warriors fled.
