= Ilocos (province) =

- Province of the Philippines
- 1571–1818
- Location of the historical province of Ilocos.
- Capital: Vigan
- Historical era: Colonial Period
  - Established: 1571
  - Disestablished: 2 February 1818
Succeeded by
Ilocos Norte; Ilocos Sur
- Today part of: · Abra · Ilocos Norte · Ilocos Sur · La Union

Ilocos was a province in northern Luzon, Philippines that comprised the present-day provinces of Ilocos Norte, Ilocos Sur, parts of La Union, and Abra. In 1818, the province was disestablshed when it was split into Ilocos Norte and Ilocos Sur through a royal decree due to rapid population growth.

== Etymology ==
Ilocos is derived from Ylokos, the pre-Hispanic name for the coastal plains stretching from Bangui in the north to Namacpacan in the south. It is also derived from the Spanish words y-looc, which translates to "from the coves" or coastal bays or looc/look where inhabitants had built settlements. When Spanish explorer Juan de Salcedo arrived in present-day Vigan on June 13, 1572, he observed the area's natural coves and named the region Ylocos and its people Ylocanos.

== History ==
In 1571, after gaining control over Manila, Spanish conquistadors led by Juan de Salcedo ventured northward with eight armed boats and a small force of 45 men. Salcedo landed in present-day Vigan in 1572 and traveled through present-day Laoag, Currimao, and Badoc, encountering indigenous communities settled in sheltered coves, or looc, and naming the area Ylokos after these coastal inhabitants.

Initially administered as part of an encomienda, the Spanish established Christian missions and governmental institutions across Ilocos to convert the native population to Catholicism. Augustinian missionaries built enduring churches and parishes, and Vigan later became the diocesan seat of Nueva Segovia. It also had 10,041 Chinese Filipino families. However, the Spanish faced resistance due to abusive colonial practices, triggering notable uprisings, including the Dingras uprising (1589), Pedro Almazan revolt (1660), the Diego and Gabriela Silang Revolt (1762–1763), and the Basi Revolt (1807). In 1762, the province became part of the independent Free Ilocos state, when Diego Silang declared liberation from Spanish rule, which then momentarily lost control due to the British occupation of Manila. It was later disestablished upon Silang's assassination in 1763.

On February 2, 1818, the province was split into Ilocos Norte and Ilocos Sur by the promulgation of a royal decree due to rapid population growth.

== See also ==
- Ilocos Norte
- Ilocos Sur
- Ilocos Region
