= Free Ilocos =

Short-lived independent state in Luzon, Philippines

- 1762–1763
- Status: British Protectorate
- Capital: Villa Fernandina
- Common languages: Ilocano, Spanish
- Governor
  - 1761–1763: Diego Silang
- History
  - Established: December 14, 1762
  - Disestablished: May 28, 1763
Preceded by	Succeeded by
Spanish Philippines	Spanish Philippines
- Today part of: Philippines

Free Ilocos was a state in Northern Luzon which was declared independent by revolutionary Diego Silang in December 14, 1762. Villa Fernandina (now Vigan) was designated as the capital of the independent state. Diego Silang led a revolt to liberate Ilocos from Spanish colonial rule taking advantage of the Spanish colonial government's momentary loss due to the British occupation of Manila. Diego Silang accepted an offer of protection and friendship sent by the British Governor of Manila, Dawsonne Drake, on September 24, 1762. Free Ilocos was effectively disestablished upon Diego Silang's assassination in 1763.
