= Garvida =

Surname list

Garvida is a surname. Notable people with the surname include:

- Jasper Garvida (born 1977), Filipino fashion designer
- Jose Garvida Flores (1900–1944), Filipino poet and playwright
