= Underwater Museum =

Underwater Museum may refer to:

- Baiheliang Underwater Museum in China
- Cancún Underwater Museum in Mexico
- Alonissos Underwater Museum in Greece
- Underwater Museum in Spain
- Museum of Underwater Art in Australia
- Pinto Underwater Sculpture Museum in the Philippines
- Whitefish Point Underwater Preserve in United States
