= Ilocos Norte =

- Province
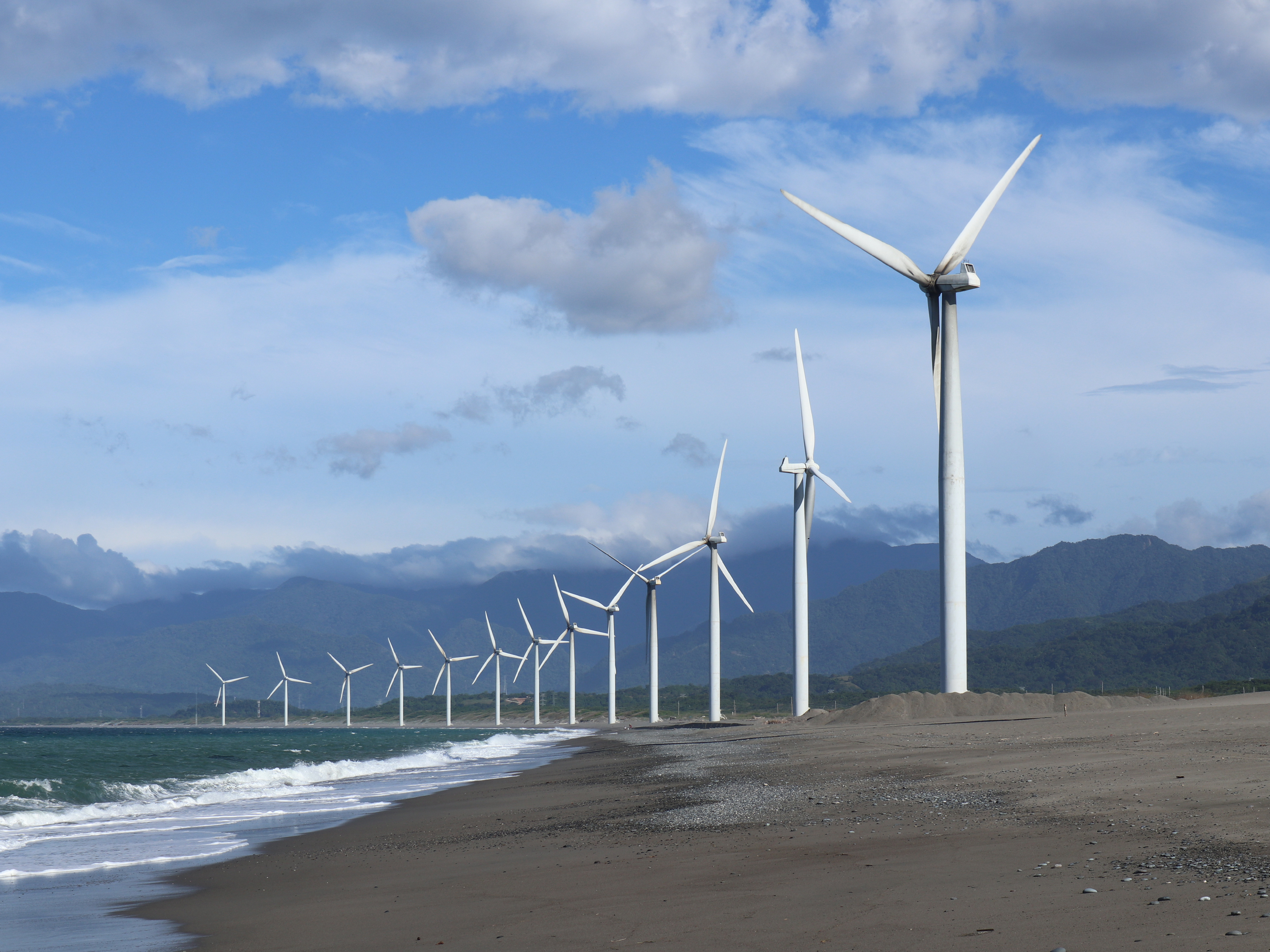
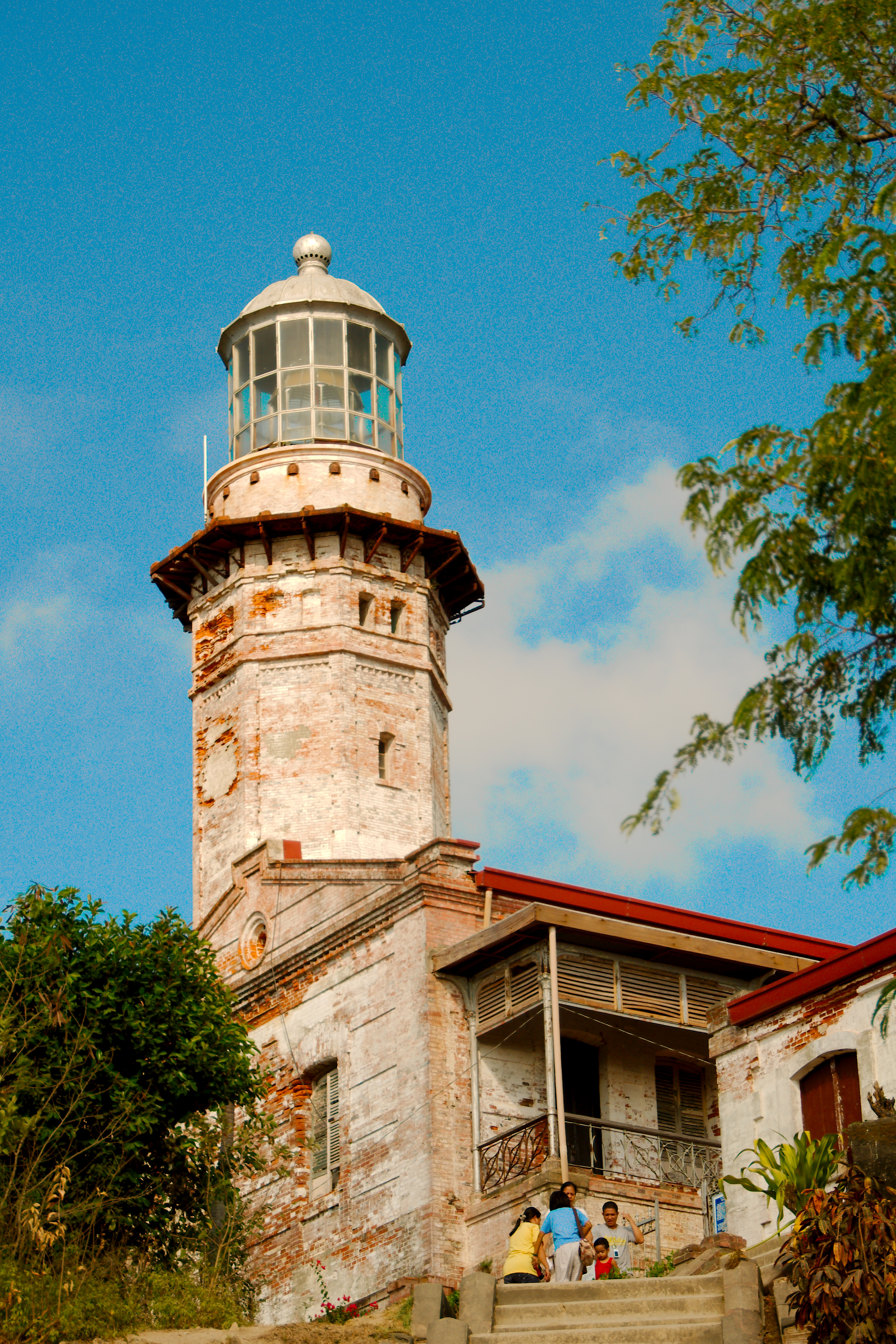
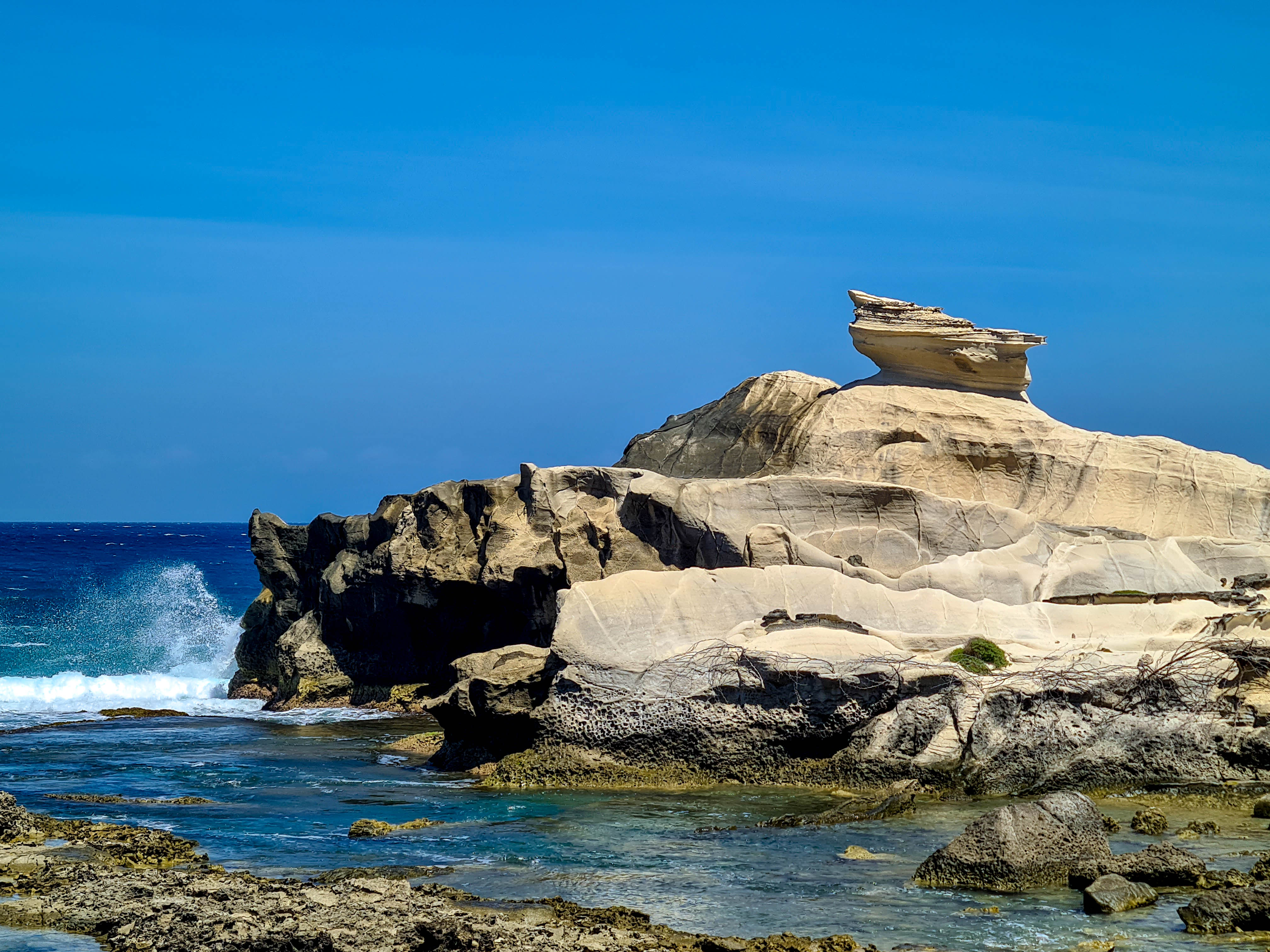
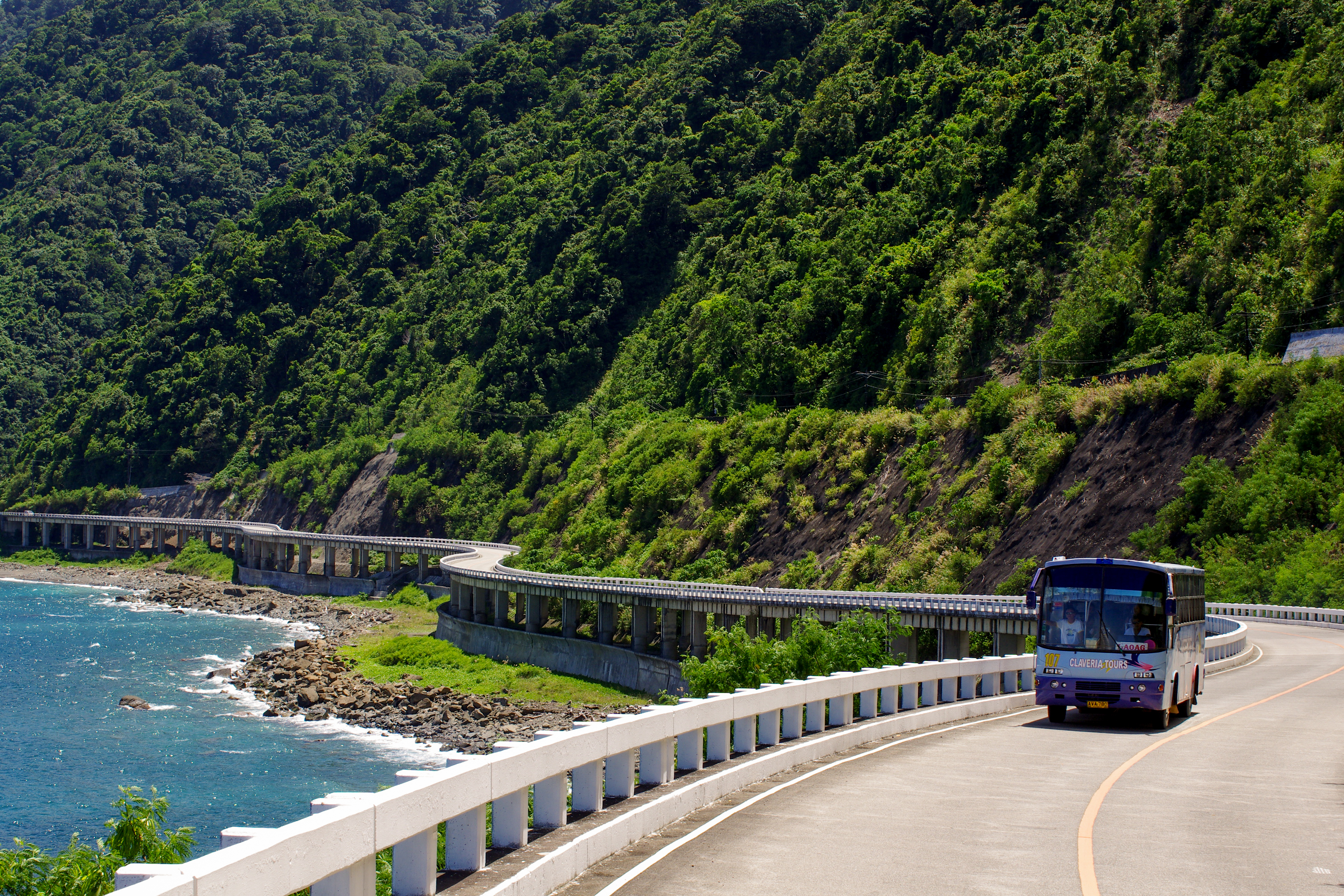
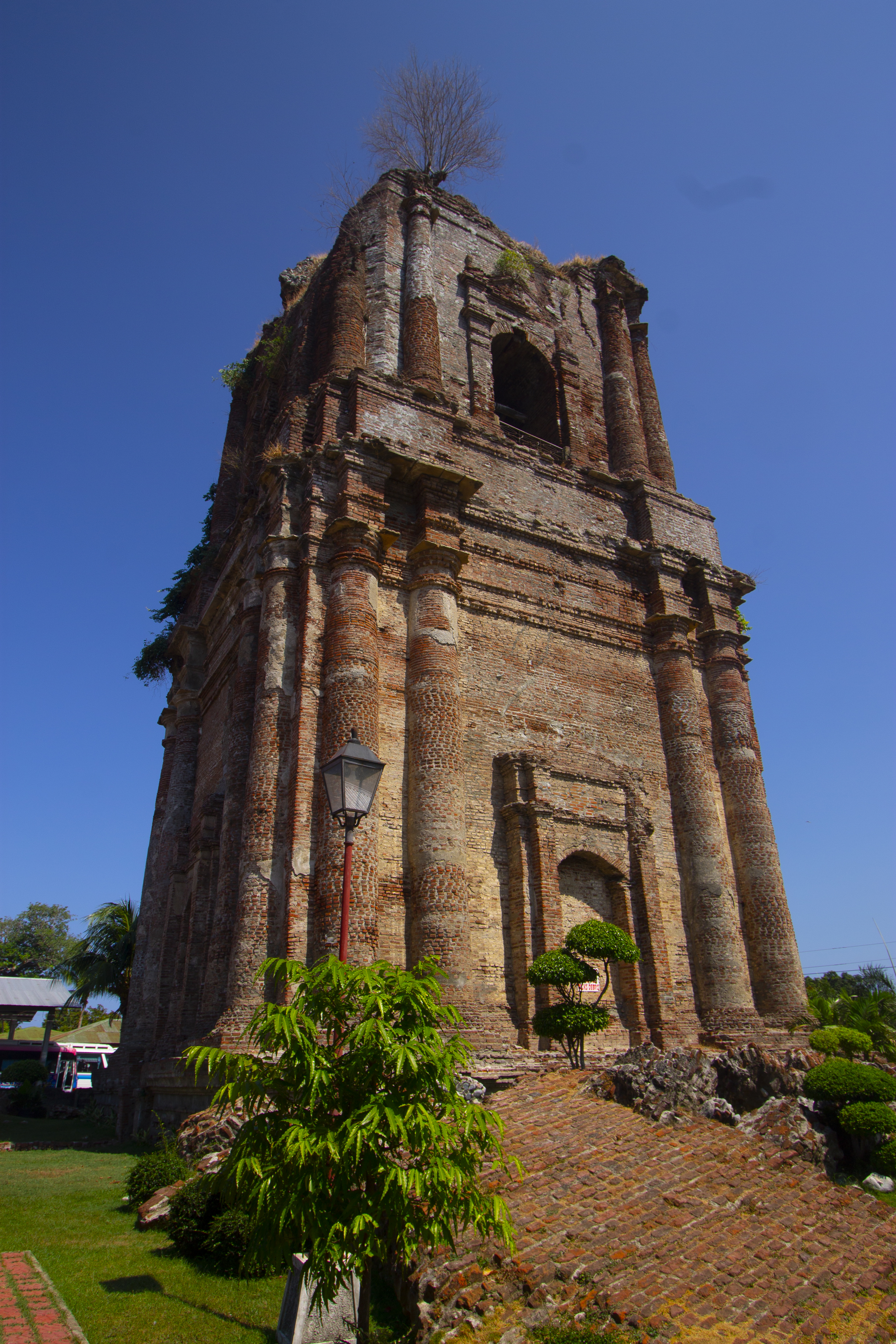
- Clockwise from the top: Bangui Windfarm, Kapurpurawan Rock Formation, Bacarra Church Belltower, Patapat Viaduct, Cape Bojeador Lighthouse

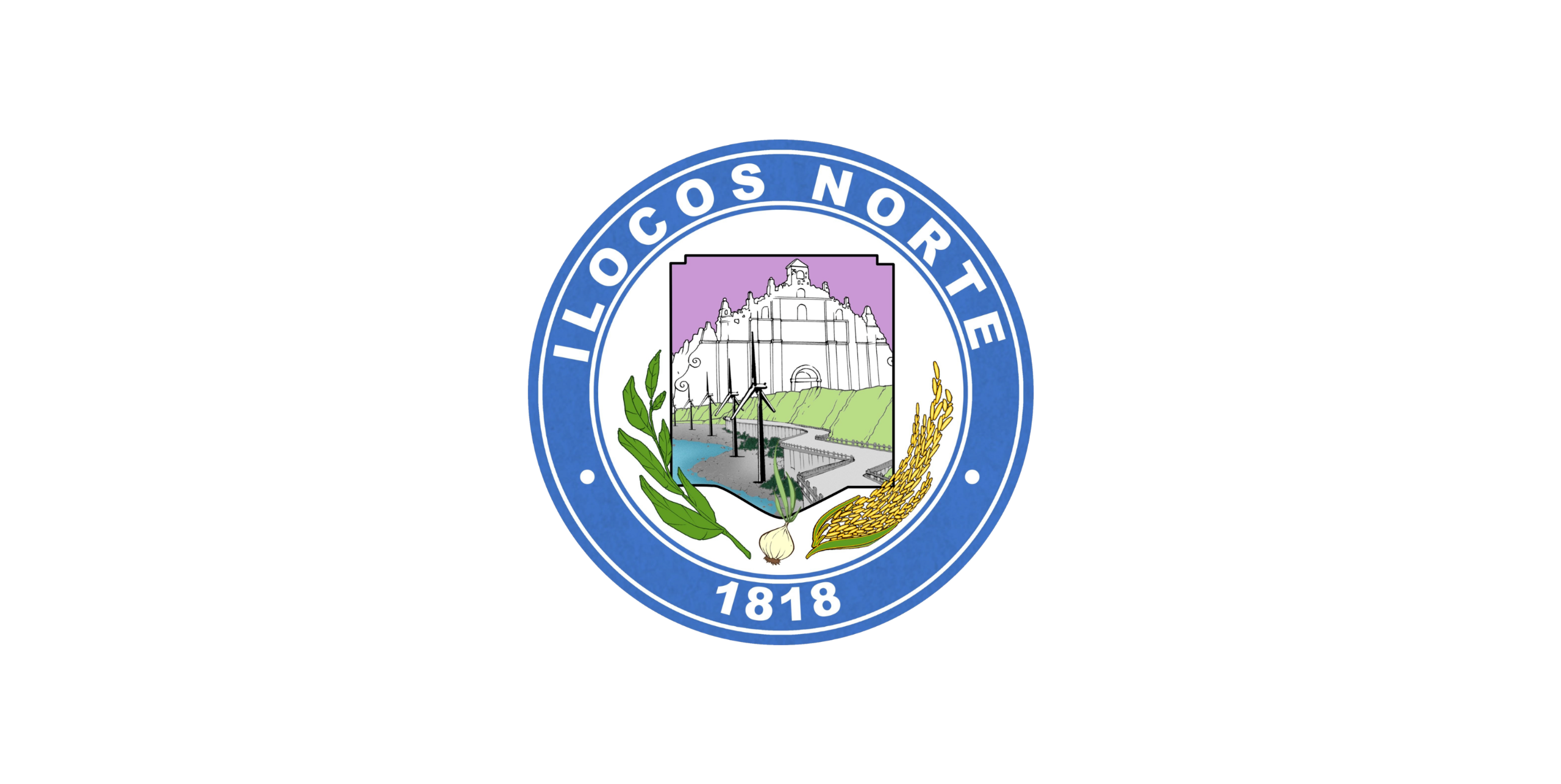
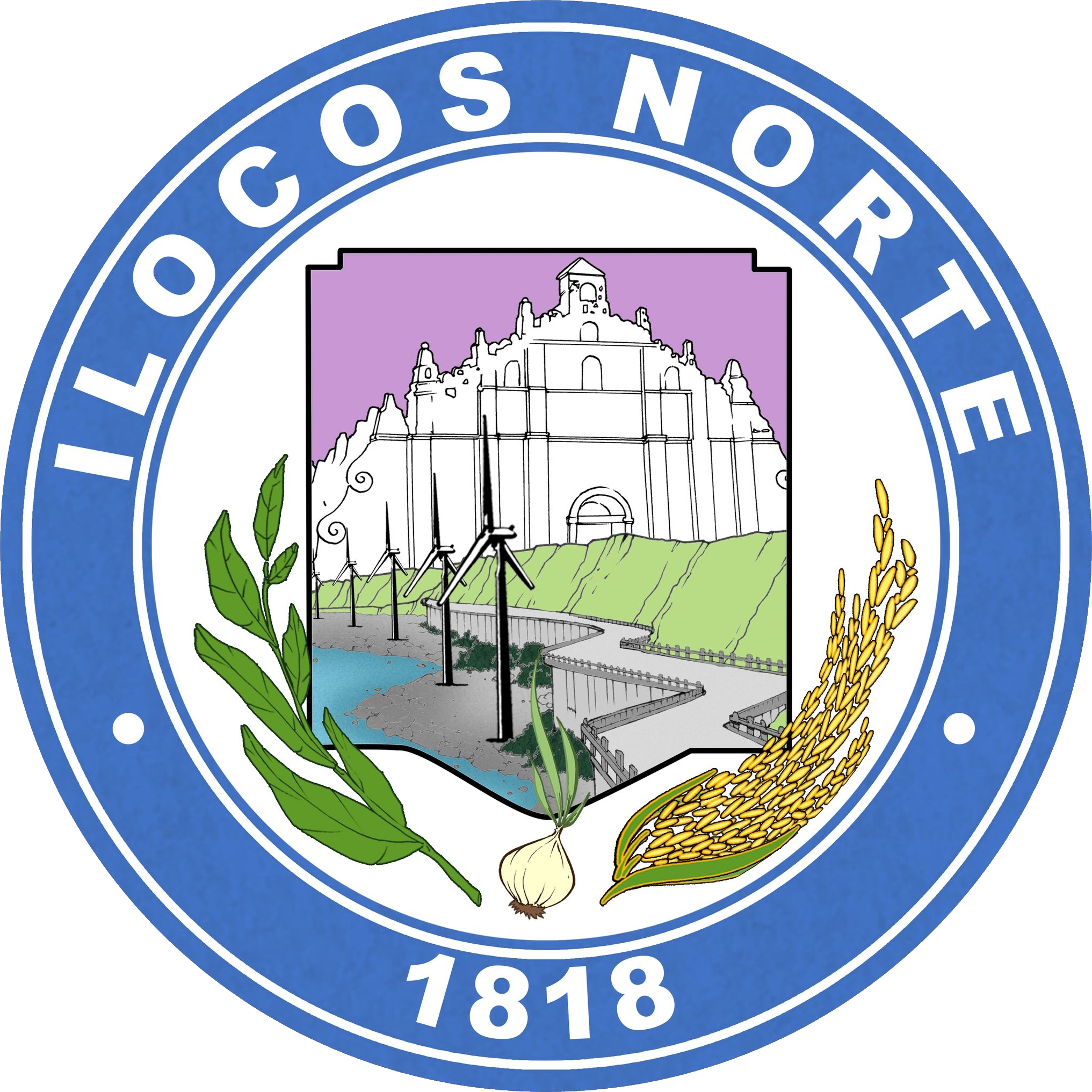
- Flag Seal

- Location in the Philippines
- Interactive map of Ilocos Norte
- Coordinates: 18°10′N 120°45′E
- Country: Philippines
- Region: Ilocos Region
- Founded: February 2, 1818
- Capital and largest city: Laoag

Government
  - Governor: Cecilia Araneta-Marcos (NP)
  - Vice Governor: Matthew Manotoc (NP)
  - Legislature: Ilocos Norte Provincial Board
  - Electorate: 436,087 voters (2025)

Area
  - Total: 3,467.89 km^{2} (1,338.96 sq mi)
  - Rank: 38th out of 82
- Highest elevation (Mount Sicapoo): 2,361 m (7,746 ft)

Population (2024 census)
  - Total: 618,850
  - Rank: 53rd out of 82
  - Density: 178.45/km^{2} (462.19/sq mi)
  - Rank: 52nd out of 82
  - Households: 152,972
- Demonyms: Ilocano (m/n); Ilocana (f)

Divisions
  - Independent cities: 0
  - Component cities: 2: Batac; Laoag
  - Municipalities: 21: Adams; Bacarra; Badoc; Bangui; Banna; Burgos; Carasi; Currimao; Dingras; Dumalneg; Marcos; Nueva Era; Pagudpud; Paoay; Pasuquin; Piddig; Pinili; San Nicolas; Sarrat; Solsona; Vintar
  - Barangays: 559
  - Districts: Legislative districts of Ilocos Norte

Economy
  - Income class: 1st provincial income class
  - Poverty incidence: 0.3% (2023)
  - Revenue: ₱ 4,243 million (2024)
  - Assets: ₱ 12,908 million (2024)
  - Expenditure: ₱ 2,963 million (2024)
  - Liabilities: ₱ 3,153 million (2024)
  - HDI: ▲0.82 (Very High)
  - HDI rank: 3rd (2024)
- Time zone: UTC+8 (PHT)
- PSGC: 012800000
- IDD : area code: +63 (0)77
- ISO 3166 code: PH-ILN
- Spoken languages: Ilocano; Filipino; English
- Website: www.ilocosnorte.gov.ph

Ilocos Norte (English: Northern Ilocos/North of Ilocos), officially the Province of Ilocos Norte (Ilocano: Probinsia ti Ilocos Norte; Tagalog: Lalawigan ng Ilocos Norte), is a province of the Philippines located in the Ilocos Region. It is located in the northwest corner of Luzon island, bordering Cagayan and Apayao to the east, and Abra to the southeast, and Ilocos Sur to the southwest. Ilocos Norte faces the South China Sea to the west and the Luzon Strait to the north. Its capital is Laoag, which is the most populous settlement in the province.

Ilocos Norte is noted for its distinctive geography and culture. This includes numerous examples of well-preserved Spanish colonial era architecture, particularly Saint William's Cathedral in Laoag with its sinking bell tower constructed in the Earthquake Baroque style, the St. Augustine Church in Paoay which is one of UNESCO's World Heritage Sites in the Philippines, and the Cape Bojeador Lighthouse. Famous geographical features include the La Paz Sand Dunes, the beaches of Pagudpud, and the eroded calcarenite Kapurpurawan rock formation in Burgos.

It is the birthplace of several notable Philippine leaders, including former President Ferdinand E. Marcos, Philippine Revolutionary War general Artemio Ricarte and Iglesia Filipina Independiente co-founder Gregorio Aglipay.

Three wind farms are located in Ilocos Norte. They are located in Burgos, Pagudpud, and Bangui; with the latter being the first wind power generation plant in the Philippines.

== History ==
=== Early history ===
Long before the arrival of the Spaniards, there existed an extensive region consisting of Ilocos Norte, Ilocos Sur, Abra and La Union. Merchants from Japan and China often visited the area to trade gold for beads, ceramics, and silk. The Austronesian inhabitants of the region called their place samtoy, from sao mi toy, which literally meant "our language".

=== Spanish colonial era ===
In 1571, the Spanish conquistadors had Manila under their control and they began looking for new sites to conquer. Miguel Lopez de Legazpi's grandson Juan de Salcedo volunteered to lead one of these expeditions. Together with 8 armed boats and 45 men, the 22-year-old voyager headed north. On June 13, 1572, Salcedo and his men landed in present-day Vigan then proceeded to Laoag, Currimao, and Badoc. As they sailed along the coast, they were surprised to see numerous sheltered coves (looc) where the locals lived in harmony. They named the region Ylocos and its people Ylocanos.

As the Christianization of the region grew, so did the landscape of the area. Vast tracts of land were utilized for churches and bell towers in line with the Spanish mission of bajo las campanas. It was not uncommon to see garrisons around the town plaza and under the church bells. Indigenous peoples living in the Ilocos Region, such as the Yapayao and Isneg, were slowly pushed into living in the sparsely populated but resource-rich mountains, which would expose them to conflicts with developers in later eras, such as during Martial Law under Ferdinand Marcos.

Spanish colonization of the region was not completely successful. Owing to the abusive practices of many Augustinian friars, a number of Ilocanos revolted. Noteworthy of these were the Dingras Uprising (1589) and the Pedro Almasan Revolt (San Nicolas, 1660). In 1762, Diego Silang led a series of battles aimed at freeing the Ilocano. When he died from friendly fire, his widow Gabriela continued his cause. Later on, she, too, was captured and executed.

In 1807 the sugar cane (basi) brewers of Piddig rose up in arms to protest the government's monopoly of the wine industry. In 1898, the church excommunicated Gregorio Aglipay for refusing to cut ties with the revolutionary forces of Gen. Emilio Aguinaldo. Unperturbed, Aglipay nevertheless established the Iglesia Filipina Independiente.

In an effort to gain political control and because of the increasing population of the region, a Royal Decree splitting Ilocos into two provinces - Ilocos Norte and Ilocos Sur - was signed on February 2, 1818. Soon thereafter, La Union and Abra became independent provinces. The municipality of Bangui was noted to have 5 Spanish-Filipino families.

=== Japanese occupation ===
After the fall of Corregidor and the subsequent occupation of the Philippines by the Empire of Japan, a number of small guerrilla groups formed in the area of Ilocos Norte. While some resorted to banditry, Governor Roque Ablan Sr. and Philippine Army Lt. Feliciano Madamba were able to put together a guerrilla unit to engage the Japanese forces and to rally the other guerrilla groups into a common force. The leaders were assigned specific sectors using a system for distributing news and orders.

=== Philippine independence ===
The decade after the recognition of Philippine independence marked a return of the tobacco industry to Ilocos Norte. Ever since the end of the tobacco monopoly, tobacco production had declined in the Ilocos as Filipinos started shifting from locally made cigars to foreign made cigarettes. But after reading a feature article series by Maximo Soliven which explained why Virginia tobacco would grow well on Ilocos soil, businessman Harry Stonehill was convinced to invest extensively in rebuilding the industry, establishing the Philippine Tobacco Flue-Curing and Redrying Corporation (PTFCRC) in 1951 and recruiting farmers from throughout Region 1 to produce tobacco. The following year, La Union Congressman Manuel T. Cases filed a bill to "limit the importation of foreign leaf tobacco," which was eventually signed by President Elpidio Quirino as Republic Act 698. This allowed Stonehill's investments to make a handsome profit, and the newly-rebuilt local industry to bloom. Stonehill was later deported a decade later, in the 1960s, for tax evasion and bribery of government officials, in what would later be called the Stonehill scandal, but the tobacco industry continued to grow.

=== Martial law era ===
Ilocos Norte gained additional prominence in December 1965 when Ferdinand Marcos became president, and again when he won a second term in 1969, boosted by debt-driven infrastructure spending that created economic crises and massive social unrest at the beginning of the 1970s. Facing the end of his constitutionally allowed presidential terms, he declared martial law in 1972 and became dictator under a system of constitutional authoritarianism for fourteen more years. His family and cronies were accused of stealing an estimated US$5 billion to US$10 billion during the 1980s, when the Philippine economy sharply declined until Marcos was deposed by the civilian-led People Power Revolution of February 1986.

Various human rights violations were documented in the Ilocos Norte region during the Marcos martial law era, despite public perception that the region was supportive of Marcos' administration. Various farmers from the towns of Vintar, Dumalneg, Solsona, Marcos, and Piddig were documented to have been tortured, and eight farmers in Bangui and three indigenous community members in Vintar were "salvaged" in 1984.

There were also various protests against the Marcos administration at the time, with Aurora Park in the Laoag Plaza being one of the favored places to stage protests. One of the prominent victims of the Martial Law era who came from Laoag was Catholic layperson and social worker Purificacion Pedro, who volunteered in organizations protesting the Chico River Dam Project in the nearby Cordillera Central mountains. Wounded while visiting activist friends in Bataan, she was later killed by Marcos administration soldiers while recuperating in the hospital. Another prominent opponent of the martial law regime was human rights advocate and Bombo Radyo Laoag program host David Bueno, who worked with the Free Legal Assistance Group in Ilocos Norte during the later part of the Marcos administration and the early part of the succeeding Aquino administration. He would later be assassinated by motorcycle-riding men in fatigue uniforms on October 22, 1987 – part of a wave of assassinations that coincided with the 1986–87 coup d'état that tried to unseat the democratic government set up after the 1986 People Power Revolution. Both Bueno and Pedro were later honored among the first 65 people to have their names inscribed on the Wall of Remembrance of the Philippines' Bantayog ng mga Bayani, which honors the martyrs and heroes who fought the dictatorship, and Pedro was listed among Filipino Catholics nominated to be named Servant of God.

=== Contemporary ===
The municipality of Batac became a component city by virtue of Republic Act No. 9407 which sought to convert the municipality into a city. The law was ratified on June 23, 2007. However, the cityhood status was lost twice in the years 2008 and 2010 after the LCP questioned the validity of the cityhood law. The cityhood status was reaffirmed after the court finalized its ruling on February 15, 2011 which declared the cityhood law constitutional.

Ilocos Norte was among the provinces affected by the COVID-19 pandemic in the Philippines, reporting its first three cases of COVID-19 on March 31, 2020, including a male patient each from Batac and Paoay, and former senator Bongbong Marcos, who had arrived from travel to Spain. Ilocos Norte experienced surges in cases in 2021, with the spike reported in August 2021 being attributed to the Delta variant of the virus.

== Geography ==
Ilocos Norte covers a total area of 3,467.89 square kilometres (1,338.96 sq mi) occupying the northern tip of the Ilocos Region in Luzon. The province is bordered by Cagayan to the extreme northeast, Apayao to the east, and Abra to the southeast, Ilocos Sur to the southwest, the South China Sea to the west, and the Luzon Strait to the north.

=== Administrative divisions ===
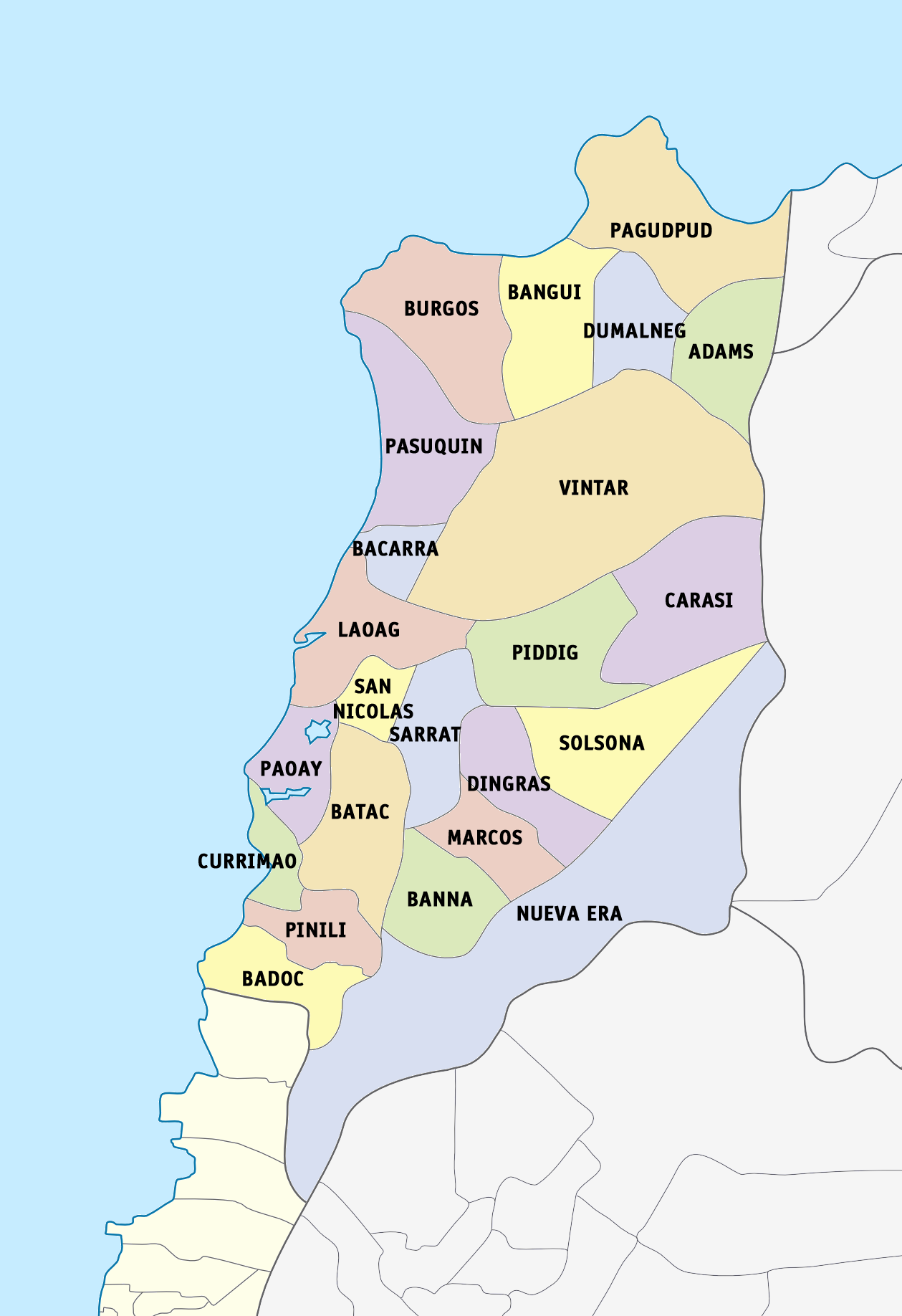
Administrative divisions of Ilocos Norte

Ilocos Norte comprises 21 municipalities and 2 component cities, further subdivided into 559 barangays. There are two legislative districts in the province. Updated classification of municipalities in Ilocos Norte. Updated Income Class of Ilocos Norte Municipalities

- † Provincial capital and component city
- ∗ Component city
- Municipality

City or municipality		District	Population			±% p.a.	Area		Density		Barangay	Coordinates^{[A]}
			(2020)		(2015)		km^{2}	sq mi	/km^{2}	/sq mi		
Adams		1st	0.4%	2,189	1,792	+3.88%	159.31	61.51	14	36	1	18°27′41″N 120°54′13″E
Bacarra		1st	5.5%	33,496	32,215	+0.75%	65.32	25.22	510	1,300	43	18°15′10″N 120°36′42″E
Badoc		2nd	5.3%	32,530	31,616	+0.54%	76.68	29.61	420	1,100	31	17°55′36″N 120°28′26″E
Bangui		1st	2.5%	15,019	14,672	+0.45%	112.98	43.62	130	340	14	18°32′12″N 120°45′57″E
Banna		2nd	3.2%	19,297	19,438	−0.14%	92.73	35.80	210	540	20	17°58′48″N 120°39′18″E
Batac	∗	2nd	9.1%	55,484	55,201	+0.10%	161.06	62.19	340	880	43	18°03′24″N 120°33′50″E
Burgos		1st	1.8%	10,759	9,777	+1.84%	128.90	49.77	83	210	11	18°30′40″N 120°38′37″E
Carasi		1st	0.3%	1,607	1,567	+0.48%	82.97	32.03	19	49	3	18°08′27″N 120°49′17″E
Currimao		2nd	2.0%	12,215	12,184	+0.05%	34.08	13.16	360	930	23	18°01′10″N 120°29′12″E
Dingras		2nd	6.6%	40,127	38,562	+0.76%	96.00	37.07	420	1,100	31	18°06′09″N 120°42′05″E
Dumalneg		1st	0.5%	3,087	2,947	+0.89%	88.48	34.16	35	91	4	18°31′19″N 120°48′35″E
Laoag City	†	1st	18.3%	111,651	111,125	+0.09%	116.08	44.82	960	2,500	80	18°11′50″N 120°35′37″E
Marcos		2nd	3.0%	18,010	17,777	+0.25%	72.77	28.10	250	650	13	18°02′38″N 120°40′38″E
Nueva Era		2nd	2.0%	11,968	9,506	+4.48%	515.02	198.85	23	60	11	17°54′55″N 120°39′58″E
Pagudpud		1st	4.1%	25,098	23,770	+1.04%	194.90	75.25	130	340	16	18°33′36″N 120°47′19″E
Paoay		2nd	4.1%	25,001	24,866	+0.10%	76.24	29.44	330	850	31	18°03′42″N 120°31′10″E
Pasuquin		1st	4.9%	29,678	28,980	+0.45%	210.54	81.29	140	360	33	18°20′02″N 120°37′10″E
Piddig		1st	3.7%	22,475	21,497	+0.85%	216.20	83.48	100	260	23	18°09′49″N 120°42′59″E
Pinili		2nd	2.9%	17,626	17,300	+0.36%	89.48	34.55	200	520	25	17°57′07″N 120°31′33″E
San Nicolas		2nd	6.4%	38,895	36,736	+1.09%	40.18	15.51	970	2,500	24	18°10′30″N 120°35′39″E
Sarrat		1st	4.1%	25,186	25,212	−0.02%	57.39	22.16	440	1,100	24	18°09′24″N 120°38′48″E
Solsona		2nd	4.1%	24,851	24,121	+0.57%	166.23	64.18	150	390	22	18°05′43″N 120°46′24″E
Vintar		1st	5.5%	33,339	32,220	+0.65%	614.35	237.20	54	140	33	18°13′47″N 120°38′57″E
Total				609,588	593,081	+0.52%	3,467.89	1,338.96	180	440	559	(see GeoGroup box)
1. Coordinates mark the city/town center, and are sortable by latitude.

=== Barangays ===
Ilocos Norte has 559 barangays comprising its 21 municipalities and 2 cities.

The most populous barangay in the province is Barangay No. 1, San Lorenzo (Poblacion) in the City of Laoag with a population of 4,391 in the 2010 census. If cities are excluded, Davila in the municipality of Pasuquin has the highest population, at 3,900. The least populous is Sapat in the municipality of Pasuquin, with only 32.

== Demographics ==
Population census of Ilocos Norte
Year	Pop.	±% p.a.
1903	178,995	—
1918	219,129	+1.36%
1939	237,586	+0.39%
1948	251,455	+0.63%
1960	287,333	+1.12%
1970	343,427	+1.80%
1975	371,724	+1.60%
1980	390,666	+1.00%
1990	461,661	+1.68%
1995	482,651	+0.84%
2000	514,241	+1.37%
2007	547,284	+0.86%
2010	568,017	+1.36%
2015	593,081	+0.83%
2020	609,588	+0.58%
2024	618,850	+0.36%
Source: Philippine Statistics Authority

The population of Ilocos Norte in the 2024 census was 618,850 people, with a density of 180 inhabitants per square kilometre or 470 inhabitants per square mile.

=== Religion ===
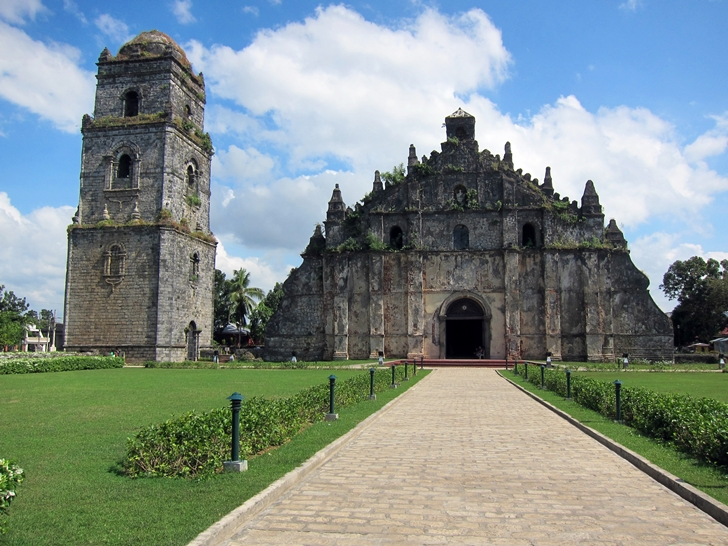
Paoay Church

Roman Catholicism and the Aglipayan Church are the two major religions in the province.

Among the major Roman Catholic churches in Ilocos Norte include:

- Paoay Church — named a UNESCO World Heritage Site in 1993.
- St. William's Cathedral in Laoag — known for its Sinking Bell Tower
- Santa Monica Church in Sarrat — documented to be the biggest church in the Ilocos Region.
- Bacarra Church — destroyed during an intensity VII (on the Rossi-Forel scale) earthquake on August 17, 1983, reconstructed and re-inaugurated in 1984.

Ilocos Norte is the home of two Aglipay Shrines (Aglipayan Church) in which one of it is where the church's first supreme leader, Gregorio Aglipay, was buried (Gregorio Aglipay National Shrine). There are also increasing numbers of Jehovah's Witnesses. There are also minor but steadily increasing members of Iglesia ni Cristo (INC). It has 2 Ecclesiastical Districts (Batac and Laoag). Each district includes 60 plus locales with barangay chapels. INC has 5-6% adherents. Islam is also practiced by Mindanaoan traders and immigrants.

=== Languages ===
Ilocano is the main language of the native majority in the province, with La Union recognized it as an official language since 2012. It became widespread in neighboring regions of Cagayan Valley (Region II), Cordillera Administrative Region and major parts of Central Luzon (Region III)—where Ilocanos settled—as a lingua franca among respective Ilocano and non-Ilocano residents. Ilocano is also recognized as a minority language in Mindoro, Palawan and Mindanao (particularly in some areas in Soccsksargen), where Ilocanos had have been significant residents since the early 20th century. It is a third most widely spoken language in the Philippines, estimating 11 million speakers as of 2022. The language has many speakers overseas, including the American states of California and Hawaii. Filipino/Tagalog and English are also spoken and understood in the region, utilized in business, education and media.

Aside from Ilocano, Filipino (the national language) and English, there are other two indigenous languages in Ilocos Norte. There are the Isnag language of the east and the Itneg in Nueva Era.

== Economy ==
Poverty incidence of Ilocos Norte (%)

Source: Philippine Statistics Authority

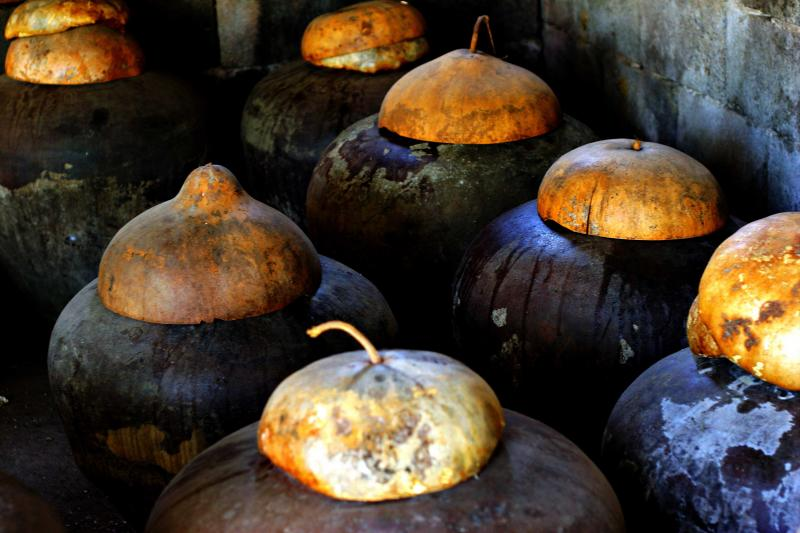
Bagoong fermenting in burnay jars

=== Economic indicators ===
Ilocos Norte's economy is thriving, with a 5.4% growth in 2024, reaching ₱106.51 billion and boasting the highest per capita GDP in the region at ₱172,106. The economy is driven by services (52.3% share), robust tourism, and construction. With a 98.9% employment rate and low poverty, it is a leading economic performer in Region I.

=== Products and industries ===
The province specializes in the following products and industries:

- Agriculture — rice, corn, garlic, legumes, root crops, tobacco, and other fruits and vegetables
- Fishery — tilapia and assorted fishes
- Livestock — swine and cattle
- Cottage industries — loom weaving, furniture, ceramics, iron works
- Manufacturing and food processing — salt, empanada, bagoong, patis, basi (native Ilocano wine), vinegar, longganisa, chicharon, bagnet, chichacorn (cornick), jewelry, garments, cereal processing, packaging, mechanized processing equipment
- Wind Power — Ilocos Norte's position on the northwest corner of Luzon makes it ideal for wind power generation. There is currently a 25 Megawatt wind farm in Ilocos Norte, and several more wind energy projects are being planned
- Tourism
- Pottery

=== Bangui Wind Farm ===
In 2005, NorthWind Power Development Corp. began commercial operation of the Bangui Wind Farm in the Municipality of Bangui, having initiated and developed the project in response to a 1996 study by the National Renewable Energy Laboratory (NREL) which identified Bangui as one of the viable sites for wind energy sites in the Philippines. Connected to the Luzon Grid, the project was the first wind farm in Southeast Asia, supplying 40% of Ilocos Norte's electricity needs, and becoming a major tourist site for Bangui. AC Energy, the listed energy platform of the Ayala Group, acquired the controlling shares of Northwind and of the Bangui Wind Farm in 2017.

== Culture and the arts ==
=== Prominent artists ===
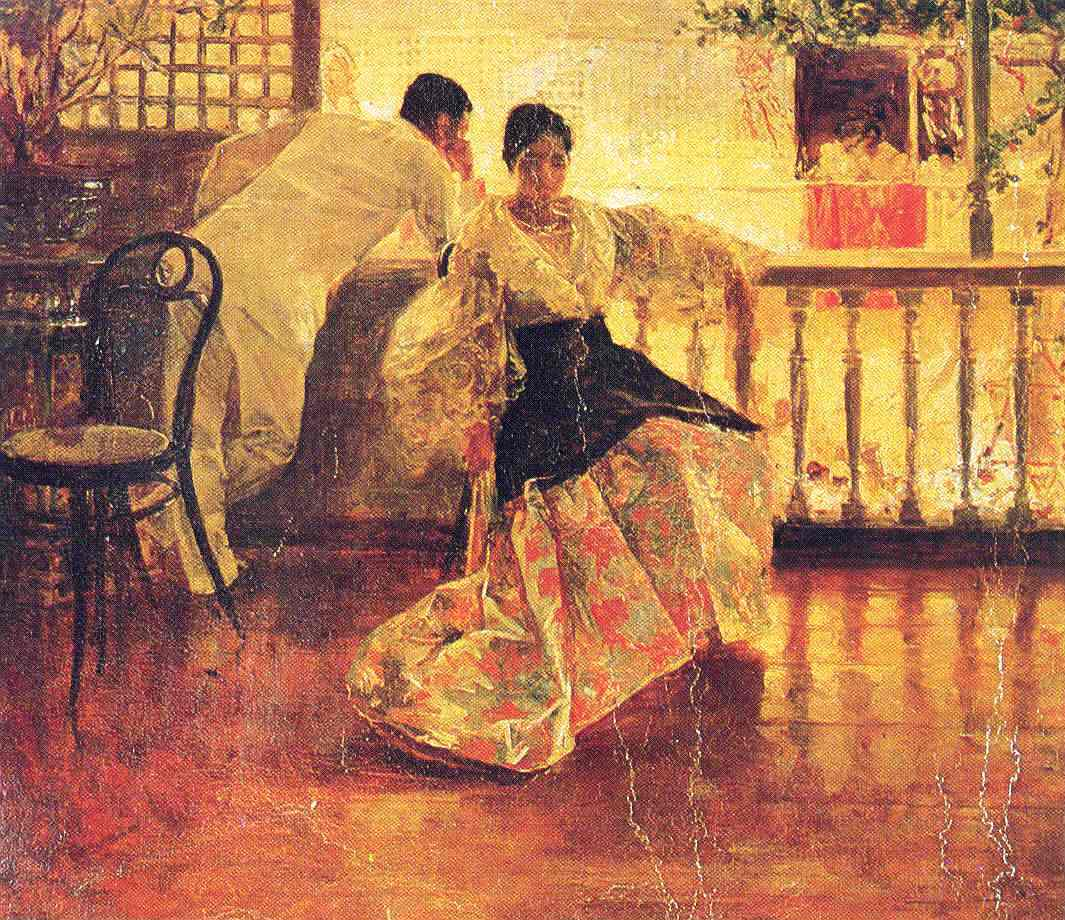
Tampuhan by Juan Luna

Ilocos Norte has given birth to numerous artists that have received national acclaim - perhaps the most notable being Philippine Revolution era activist and leader Juan Luna, who was born in Badoc. The province is also home to at least one National Artists of the Philippines - National Artist for Theater Severino Montano who was conferred the honor in 2001. Another influential artist was Ricarte Puruganan, one of the Philippines' influential "Thirteen Moderns," who broke away from the painting style of Conservatives, led by Fernando Amorsolo, during the first half of the 20th century.

In the folk arts, the Philippines also recognizes Magdalena Gamayo of Pinili. Ilocos Norte as one of its National Living Treasures for textile weaving, preserving the inabel weaving tradition of the Ilocos region.

=== Damili ===
The town of San Nicolas is known for its terracotta pottery, called damili after the Ilocano language word for pottery. San Nicolas' pottery tradition has been declared part of the Philippine National Commission for Culture and the Arts' School of Living Traditions program.

=== Inabel ===
Ilocos Norte is a center of the inabel weaving tradition, whose cloths are well known for being soft but sturdy, with a wide range of pattern designs drawn from Ilocano culture and experience

=== Cuisine ===
Filipino culinary historian Doreen Fernandez notes that bitterness as a flavor principle is a uniquely prominent in Ilocano cuisine, quoting fellow food critic Edilberto Alegre saying the bitter "Ilocos Norte mystique" is best represented in papaitan, a meat variant of kilawin characterized by its bitter flavors.

== Government ==
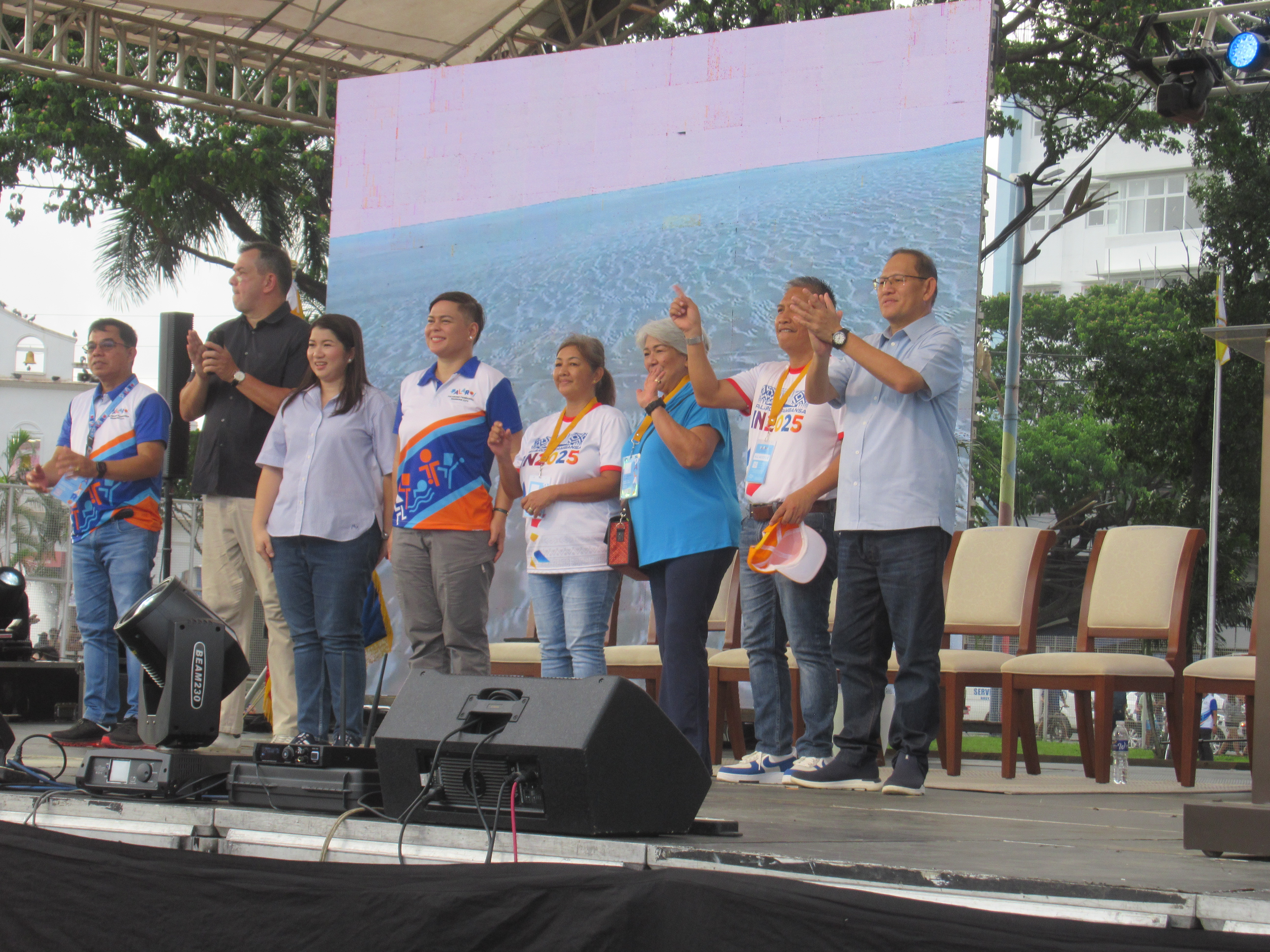
Cecilia Araneta-Marcos at Marikina Sports Center

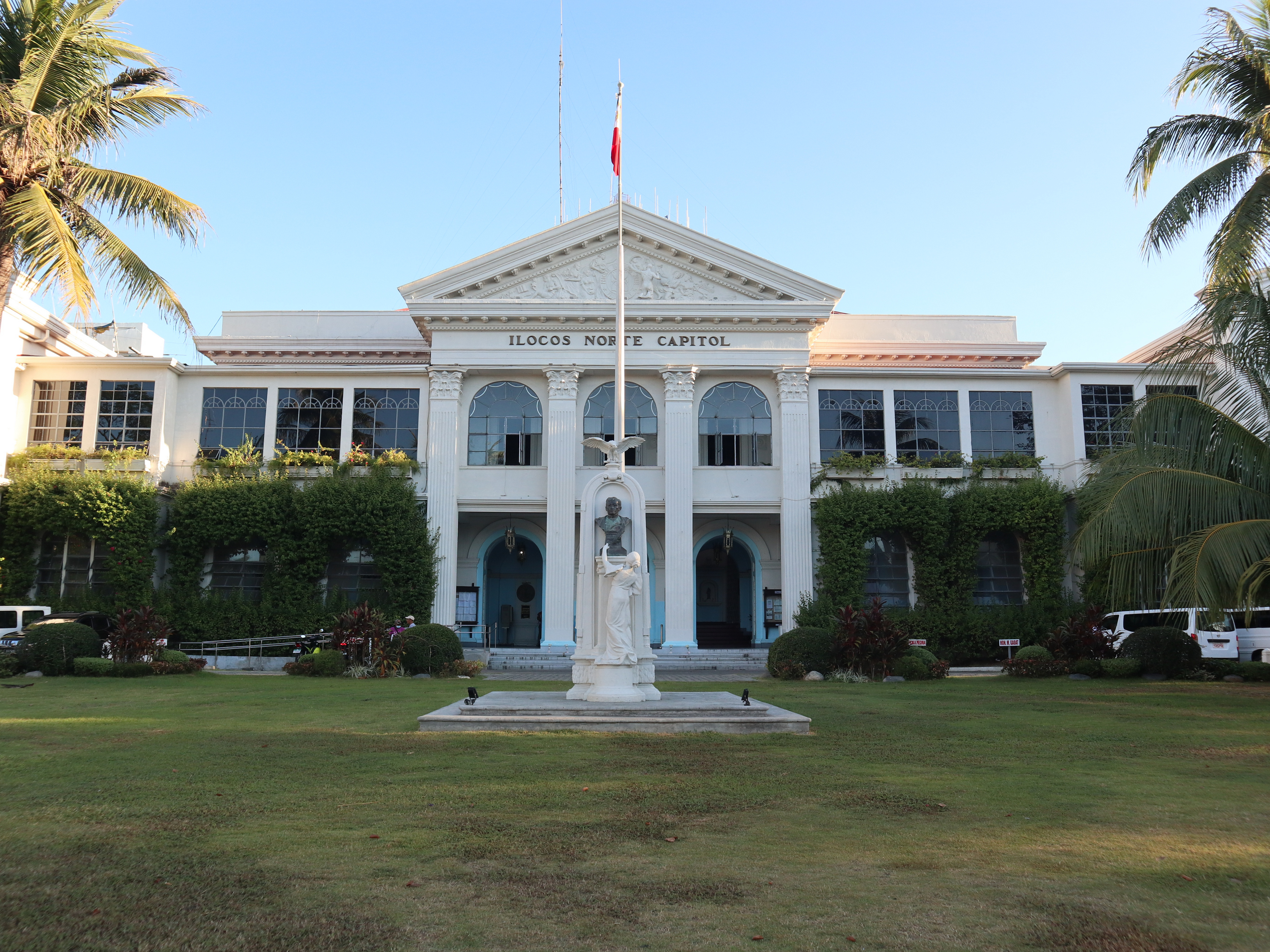
Ilocos Norte Capitol, the seat of the provincial government

Term of Office: June 30, 2025 - June 30, 2028

- Governor: Cecilia Araneta-Marcos (Nacionalista)
- Vice-Governor: Matthew Joseph Marcos-Manotoc (Nacionalista)

Sangguniang Panlalawigan Members

1st District

- Roger John C. Fariñas II (Reporma)
- Johanson T. Chua (Nacionalista)
- Rodolfo Christian G. Fariñas III (Reporma)
- Marlon Ferdinand T. Sales (Nacionalista)
- Saul Paulo A. Lazo (Nacionalista)

2nd District

- Medeldorf M. Gaot (Nacionalista)
- Giancarlo Angelo S. Crisostomo (Nacionalista)
- Aladine T. Santos (Independent)

Ex-Officio Members

- Ryan John Pascua (President, Liga ng mga Barangay)
- Jaybee G. Baquiran (President, PCL)
- Eldritze C. Viernes (President, Panlalawigang Pederasyon ng Sangguniang Kabataan)
- Cheryll Bromeo Tabangay (Representative, IPMR)

== House of Representatives ==
District	Representative	Party	Term	Bloc
1st	Ferdinand Alexander A. Marcos III	Lakas	2	Majority
2nd	Eugenio Angelo M. Barba	Nacionalista	3	Majority

== Tourism ==
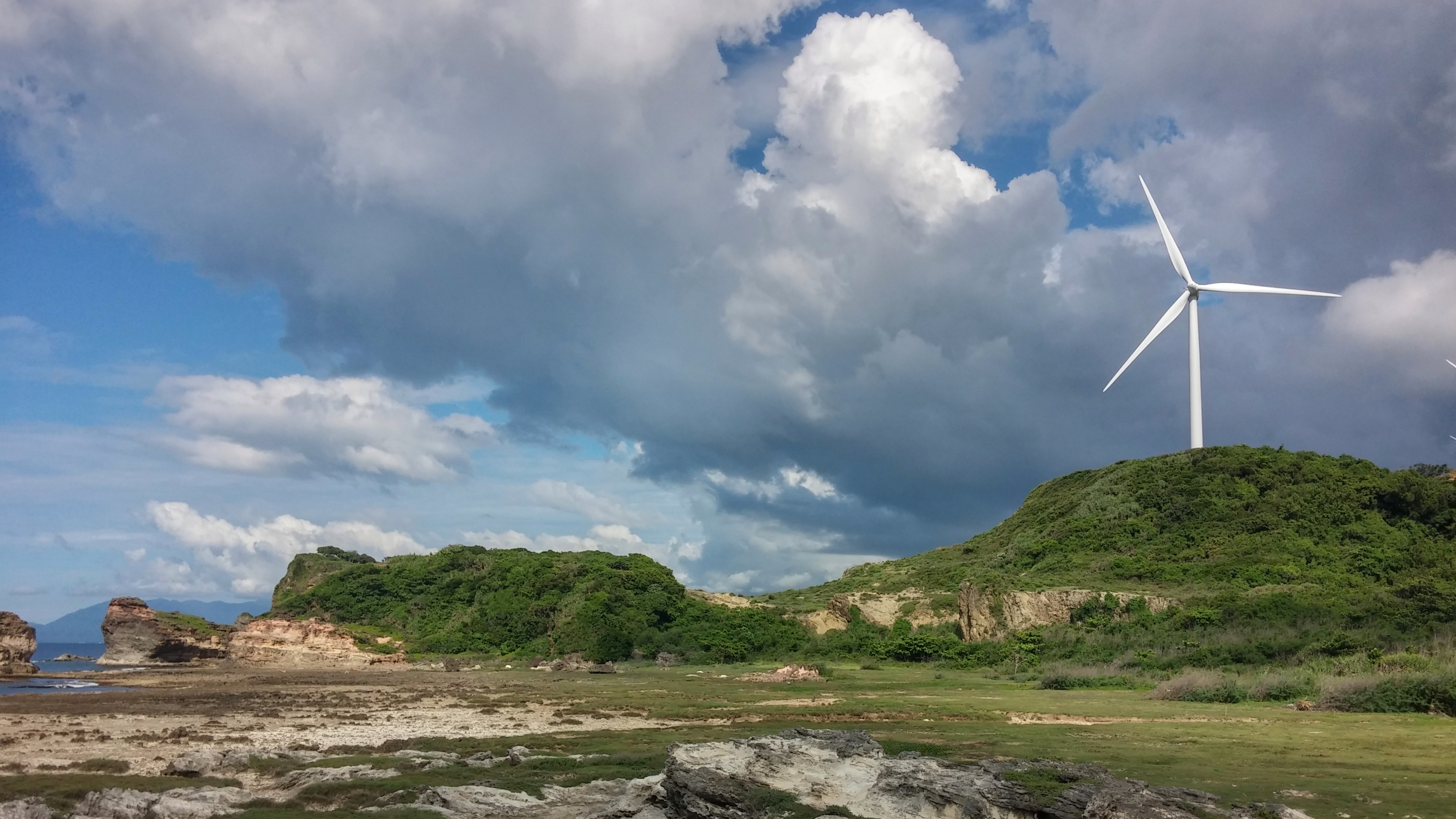
Kapurpurawan Rock Formation in Burgos

Ilocos Norte is a tourist destination, being the location of Fort Ilocandia, hotel, resort and casino. Built between 1981 and 1983 by the Philippine Tourism Authority, the Spanish-Moroccan Villa was designed by Architect Jeorge Ramos. The golf course on Paoay Lake was built by Marcos in 1977 and was designed by Gary Player.

Also of note are the La Paz Sand Dunes, Malacañang of the North, Cape Bojeador Lighthouse, Bangui Wind Farm, Saud Beach in Pagudpud and the Early Pliocene calcarenite Kapurpurawan Burgos Formation which was sculpted by wind and waves.

== Notable people ==
- Gregorio Aglipay – Co-founder and the First Supreme Bishop of the Philippine Independent Church
- Roque B. Ablan, Sr. - Filipino lawyer and politician. He served as the Governor of Ilocos Norte from 1937 to 1943.
- Roque Ablan, Jr. - Filipino lawyer politician who served as representative from the 1st District of Ilocos Norte.
- Rodolfo Fariñas - Filipino lawyer, politician and the former Majority Floor Leader of the House of Representatives of the Philippines and represented the 1st District of Ilocos Norte.
- Ria Christina Fariñas - Filipino politician who represented the 1st District of Ilocos Norte in the Philippine House of Representatives from 2019 to 2022.
- Mariano R. Nalupta, Jr. - Filipino lawyer and politician. He was Congressman of the 2nd District of Ilocos Norte from 1987 to 1992. He later served as Vice Governor of Ilocos Norte from 1992 to 2001.
- Jesus R. Nalupta, Sr. - Filipino lawyer and politician. He served as Mayor of Batac, Ilocos Norte for five terms.
- Antonio Raquiza - Filipino lawyer and politician.
- Rolando Abadilla - Filipino politician and Philippine Constabulary (PC) officer best known for heading the PC Metropolitan Command's Intelligence and Security Group (METROCOM).
- Benjamin C. Acorda, Jr. - Filipino police officer who served as the Chief of the Philippine National Police from April 24, 2023 until his extended forced retirement on March 31, 2024. He was currently the Executive Director of the Presidential Anti-Organized Crime Commission.
- Ricardo Visaya - Retired Philippine Army general serving as the administrator of the National Irrigation Administration (NIA) since 2017. He was the 47th Chief of Staff of the Armed Forces of the Philippines from July to December 2016.
- Arsenio M. Balisacan - Filipino economist and academic who has served as the first secretary of the Department of Economy, Planning, and Development, under President Bongbong Marcos since 2025.
- Jacinto Caoili - Poet and author of famous literary works such as 'Pasyon' at 'Urbana at Felisa'.
- Saralogo Ambaristo - Tingguian leader of Basi Revolt in 1807.
- Anastacia Giron-Tupas - Founder of Philippine Nursing Association
- Pedro Mateo - Leader of Basi Revolt in 1807.
- Pedro Bukaneg - Poet. He is considered the "Father of Ilocano literature."
- Claro Caluya - Foremost vernacular poet and dramatist
- Valentín Díaz – Filipino revolutionary and who was among the founders of the Katipunan that started the Philippine Revolution against Spain.
- Antonio Luna – Filipino Revolutionary General
- Mateo Noriel Luga – Filipino Revolutionary General
- Artemio Ricarte – Filipino general during the Philippine Revolution and the Philippine–American War. Considered the "Father of the Philippine Army"
- Josefa Llanes Escoda – Feminist, civic leader, social worker, World War II heroine, and suffragette.
- Fidel Segundo – Filipino brigadier general and World War II hero.
- Juan Luna – Filipino painter and a political activist of the Philippine Revolution during the late 19th century.
- Purificacion Pedro – Filipina social worker and Catholic layman who was killed by soldiers under the Marcos dictatorship. Her name is inscribed in the Bantayog ng mga Bayani.
- Pedro Almazan - Wealthy leader from the present-day Ilocos Norte, led the first Ilocano revolt. With his effort, the Ilocanos turned out to be the first ethnic group outside Manila to rebel against the Spanish authority.
- Soledad Salvador – Filipina religious worker and activist in the Philippines who fought against the Marcos dictatorship. Her name is inscribed in the Bantayog ng mga Bayani.
- David Bueno – Filipino human rights lawyer and radio show host during the Marcos dictatorship. His name is inscribed in the Bantayog ng mga Bayani.
- Antonio Zumel – Filipino journalist during the Marcos dictatorship. His name is inscribed in the Bantayog ng mga Bayani.
- Severino Montano – National Artist of the Philippines for Literature
- Ramon Barba – National Scientist of the Philippines for Horticulture
- Magdalena Gamayo – inabel weaver and recipient of Gawad sa Manlilikha ng Bayan
- Ricarte Puruganan - painter
- Ray Albano - Curator, art critic, writer, poet, painter, and scholar who served as museum director of the Cultural Center of the Philippines from 1970 until his death in 1985.
- Pedro Flores - Businessman and yo-yo maker who has been credited with popularizing yo-yos in the United States. He patented an innovation to yo-yos that used a loop instead of a knot around the axle, allowing for new tricks such as the ability to "sleep".
- Salvador P. Lopez – 10th Secretary of Foreign Affairs, former Chairman of the United Nations Commission on Human Rights, and 12th President of the University of the Philippines
- Fred Ruiz Castro – 12th Chief Justice of the Supreme Court of the Philippines
- Diosdado Peralta – 26th Chief Justice of the Supreme Court of the Philippines
- Conchita Carpio-Morales – 5th Ombudsman of the Philippines, and 151st Associate Justice of the Supreme Court of the Philippines
- Rodolfo Biazon - Senator of the Philippines from June 30, 1992, up to June 30, 1995, and from June 30, 1998, up to June 30, 2010
- Aquilino "Nene" Pimentel, Jr. - Filipino politician and human rights lawyer during the Marcos Dictatorship, former mayor of Cagayan de Oro from 1980 to 1984
- Tomas Fonacier – prominent educator and historian
- Santiago Albano Pilar – writer and art historian
- Jose Garvida Flores – Ilocano poet and playwright
- Niña Ruiz Abad – Filipina Catholic Servant of God
- Orlando Quevedo – Filipino Catholic cardinal, and Archbishop Emeritus Archdiocese of Cotabato
- Cornelio Balmaceda - Former Secretary of Commerce and Industry in the Philippines.
- Santiago Fonacier – 2nd Second Supreme Bishop of the Philippine Independent Church
- Roy Cimatu - Secretary of DENR, 2017-2022 and Chief of Staff of the Armed Forces of the Philippines, 2002
- Teófilo Yldefonso – first Filipino and Southeast Asian to win an Olympic medal, and the first Filipino to win multiple medals.
- Felino Palafox - Architect and urban planner. He is the Principal Architect-Urban Planner and Founder of Palafox Associates.
- Joven Cuanang - prominent Filipino neurologist, art patron, and cultural advocate, renowned for founding the Pinto Art Museum in Antipolo, which supports local artists and promotes Filipino contemporary art.
- Ysabel Ortega - actress
- Linabelle Villarica - Filipino politician, Mayor of Meycauayan, Bulacan, wife of Henry Villarica
- Marcos family:
  - Mariano Marcos - Lawyer, educator, and politician.
  - Ferdinand Marcos - 10th President of the Philippines
  - Pacifico Marcos - Filipino physician and known younger brother of former President of the Philippines Ferdinand E. Marcos.
  - Imelda Marcos - Former first lady, widow of Ferdinand Marcos
  - Bongbong Marcos - 17th President of the Philippines, son of Ferdinand and Imelda Marcos
  - Liza Araneta Marcos - First Lady, wife of Bongbong Marcos
  - Imee Marcos - senator, daughter of Ferdinand and Imelda Marcos
  - Aimee Marcos - daughter of Ferdinand and Imelda Marcos
  - Sandro Marcos - Congressman, son of Bongbong and Liza Marcos
  - Michael Marcos Keon - Filipino politician. He served as Mayor of Laoag City from 2019-2025 and Governor of Ilocos Norte from 2007-2010.
- Julio Nalundasan - Lawyer and politician. He was first elected as representative of the 2nd district of Ilocos Norte in 1934.
- Mans Carpio - Second Gentleman Of The Philippines, lawyer, and husband of Vice-president Sara Duterte
- Fabian C. Ver - a former General and Chief of the Armed Forces of the Philippines.
