= Ricarte =

Ricarte may refer to:

- Ricarte Puruganan (1912–1998), Filipino painter
- Artemio Ricarte (1866–1945), Filipino general
- BRP Artemio Ricarte (PS-37), the third ship of the Jacinto-class corvettes
