= La Paz Sand Dunes =

Coastal sandy desert in Laoag, Philippines

Coordinates: 18°13′08″N 120°32′42″E

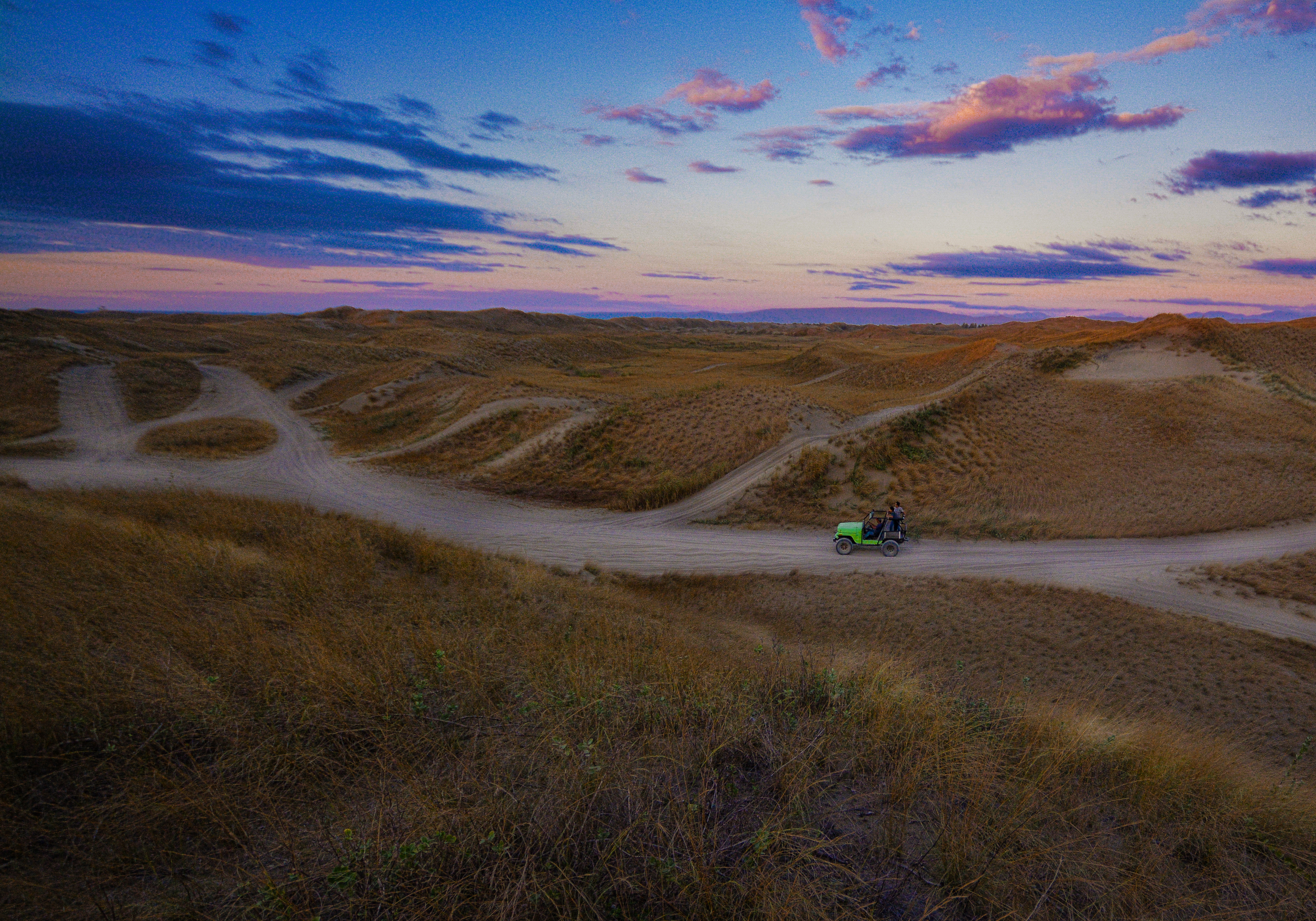

Ecology
- Biome: Deserts and xeric shrublands

Geography
- Countries: Philippines
- States: Ilocos Norte
- Climate type: Hot desert (BWh)

The La Paz Sand Dunes is an 85-square-kilometer (33 mi^{2}) protected sandy coastal desert and beach located in Laoag, Ilocos Norte, in the Philippines.

4x4 riders at La Paz Sand Dunes

The area is popular for recreational activities such as sandboarding and 4x4 vehicle riding.
