= Mateo Noriel Luga =

Filipino revolutionary (1860–68?–1935)

General Mateo Noriel Luga (1860–1868?, Ilocos Norte – April 9, 1935, Manila), with the nom-de-guerre of Alimokon, was a Filipino revolutionary who left Isabela province to join the 1896–1898 Philippine Revolution in Manila. He also participated in the consequent Philippine–American War in Luzon but was later appointed in April 1899 by Philippine President Emilio Aguinaldo and then Secretary of War Antonio Luna to assist in the resistance in Cebu. In January 1900, Luga joined the last major battle to be fought openly in said island, the Battle of Sudlon. After the fall of Sudlon, Luga and most of the revolutionaries of Cebu resorted to guerrilla warfare against the Americans which would last until the surrender of Philippine President Emilio Aguinaldo in 1901.

Following his revolutionary activities, Luga would join the Philippine Constabulary in 1904 with the rank of Third Lieutenant until 1914 when he resigned from service with the rank of Captain. After his military service, he would work under the Philippine Refining Company and will later transfer to the Public Lands Commission. He died in 1935 due to cancer. Despite not having been a Cebuano, his exploits in the Philippine-American War in Cebu gained him the distinction of being one of the 100 prominent natives of Cebu.

== Early life and military service ==
Mateo Luga was born in Paoay, Ilocos Norte, but later migrated to Tumauini Isabela province. He responded to the call-to-arms against the Spanish towards the end of the 19th century. He left home in 1896, joined the Katipuneros in Bulacan, Manila, Laguna, and Cavite, and fought the Spanish forces in Balinta, Antipolo, Montalban, San Pedro de Makate, Palipanan, Monting Lupa, Kalo-okan, and other areas until early 1899. During this period, Mateo Luga increasingly took on a leadership role in combat situations.

== Cebu Revolutionary government ==
Between the summer of 1898 and mid-1899, the province of Cebu witnessed a so-called "war within a war", during the peak of the armed insurrection against Spain. In December 1898, the Spanish Governor Adolfo Montero abandoned the province of Cebu and sought refuge in Zamboanga. As a consequence, Juan Faller Climaco and Arcadio Maxilom established a revolutionary government in Cebu, and were appointed chief of staff and councilor of peace and internal order, respectively. With the unexpected arrival of the American occupation forces in Cebu, armed hostilities broke out between the American occupying forces and the fledgling Cebuano revolutionary force in February 1899.

In April 1899, General Emilio Aguinaldo and Minister of War General Antonio Luna appointed Mateo Luga as the Katipunan's personal adviser to the Cebu revolutionary government. With his two bodyguards, Manalo Luga and another Luga cousin, Mateo travelled to Cebu disguised as a sailor on board the cargo ship Butuan. On the way to Cebu, the group passed through Iloilo, where Mateo Luga met his future wife, Ruperta Valdez, an Ilongga woman of Spanish descent. On arrival in Cebu he was arrested by the local revolutionaries on suspicion of being a Spanish spy. He was brought before General Climaco, who freed him based on a letter from General Aguinaldo confirming his allegiance to Aguinaldo and Luna. The Cebu revolutionary government divided Cebu into three operational sectors: the north under General Maxilom, the south under General Troadio Galicano, and the central zone under General Luga, the only non-Visayan in the Cebu revolutionary force, except Don Bonifacio Aranas from Camiguin.

The first encounter between the forces of General Luga and the Americans was in Mahayahay. The two forces carried out raids, assaults, ambushes, and frontal confrontations from 1899 to the latter part of 1901. Luga's fiercest battle was at Sudlon, the Revolutionary redoubt of the Katipuneros. The confrontation lasted for nine days, until January 8, 1900. The Americans assaulted the Kota defenses of General Luga, before turning back, leaving their dead and wounded behind. Despite the superior armaments of the Americans, the Katipuneros' knowledge of the terrain, fighting acumen, and willingness to sacrifice gave them an edge over the Americans.

In the following months, the Katipuneros made forays into American territory. On one occasion, General Luga and his force almost captured General Henry W. Lawton at Pardo. The Americans were having a party when General Luga conducted a raid, which surprised the Americans. General Lawton escaped by running to the seashore, boarding a launch, and remaining on board while the raid was in progress. Other bloody battles included those in San Nicolas, Bulusan, Guadalope, Mabolo, Talamban, and the city itself. General Luga was a wanted man, and his wife and children were imprisoned by the Americans to force him to surrender. Instead, Luga entered the city to stage a rescue of his family.

== End of hostilities ==
On September 15, 1901, General Robert P. Hughes arrived in Cebu with 2,000 troops, and towns, villages, and crops were laid to waste. Homes and the people's means of livelihood were demolished, and little distinction was made between combatants and the general population. Without the necessary support to continue hostilities, terms of peace were discussed with the Americans. One by one, the revolutionary leaders surrendered after General Maxilom laid down his arms on October 27, 1901. General Luga and his troops surrendered to Captain Frank McIntyre of the 19th U.S. Infantry on the same day.

Luga believed that the surrender was not the end of his fighting career. He accepted the commission to become an officer of the constabulary organized by the Americans to maintain peace and order in the region. Despite his mistrust of the Americans, he accepted the commission, hoping that he could help bring peace back to the countryside. He joined the constabulary force along with a few men, including General Rafael Crame. His activities as a peace officer took him as far as Samar and Leyte, in pursuit of a bandit group known as the Pulahanes. He was tasked to make Cebu clean and bandit-free. By 1908, Luga had risen to the rank of captain in the constabulary.

== Dissent and retirement ==
In 1914, Luga disapproved of the widely anticipated battle for power in South East Asia between the United States and Japan. He had been critical of the onerous provisions of the Hare–Hawes–Cutting Act, which provided for the establishment of the Philippine Commonwealth, under which a ten-year transitional government supervised by the United States would be set up prior to independence, as well as the establishment of American military and naval bases in the Philippines. Luga called the act, "a castle coated with honey", adding that "Those naval and military reservations are the stumbling blocks to the granting of our freedom and in our policy on foreign relations. There is really nothing wrong with us if America will not go to war with other countries. But if she does, we will be the first ones to suffer for we will be made to pay dearly for the consequences." This statement would be proven later during the Second World War. Despite Luga's unblemished record of service, his views led him to be placed under surveillance. Eventually, he resigned from the constabulary.

Upon his resignation in 1914, he was employed by the Philippine Refining Company, an American firm that was the predecessor of Unilever Philippines. After this, he worked for the Public Lands Commission, where he was assigned the task of giving away homesteads to deserving applicants. He was able to acquire 24 hectares for himself in Sagay, Negros Occidental where he retired into a simple country life with his wife, Ruperta, and their children, Maria, Jose, Pilar and twins Emilio and Antonio, who were named after Aguinaldo and Luna.

On his way back home to Negros from a visit to his hometown in Isabela, Luga was found to be stricken with cancer. He died in Manila in 1935. Many of his comrades-in-arms attended his funeral, including General Aguinaldo and the remaining Katipuneros.

== Legacy ==
According to Victor Hurley, Luga was "a gallant insurgent leader before donning the red epaulets of the Constabulary", and "no member of the corps wore the uniform of the jungle police with greater distinction than this swart, fearless Filipino." It was said that Luga had gained the respect of the American army during the insurrection with his courage and honourable conduct. One American officer reportedly that, "In Mateo Luga, you saw a man to remember as long as you live."
