= David Bueno =

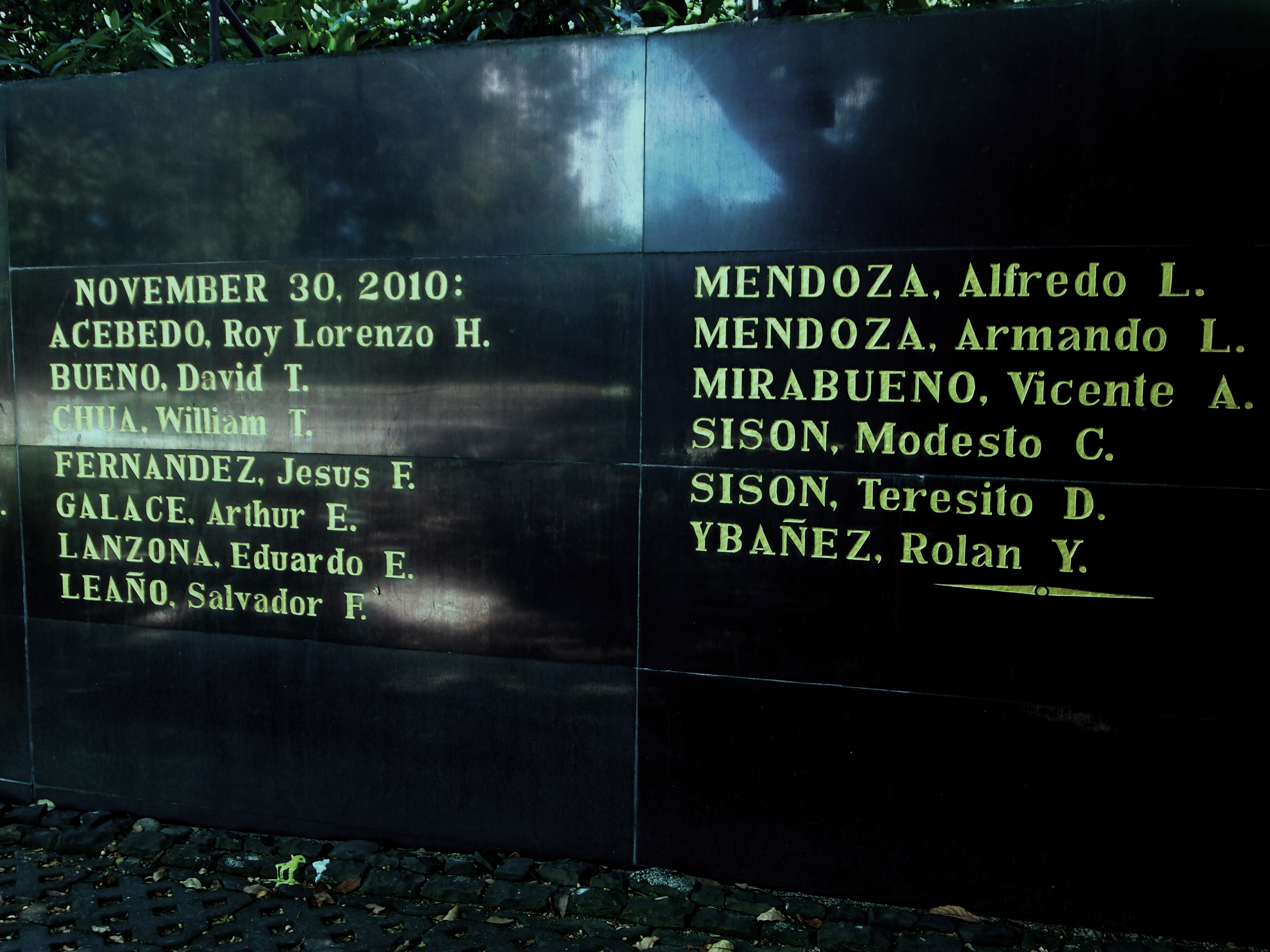
- Detail of the Wall of Remembrance at the Bantayog ng mga Bayani, showing names from the 2010 batch of Bantayog Honorees, including that of David Bueno.
- Born: David Triunfante Bueno; April 14, 1956; Piddig, Ilocos Norte, Philippines
- Died: October 22, 1987 (aged 31); Laoag, Ilocos Norte, Philippines
- Education: San Beda College (LL.B.)
- Occupations: Lawyer, radio personality
- Organization: Free Legal Assistance Group

David Triunfante Bueno (April 14, 1956 – October 22, 1987) was a Filipino human rights lawyer and radio show host from Ilocos Norte, best known his work as the most prominent human rights lawyer in Ilocos Norte during the later part of the Marcos administration and the early part of the succeeding Aquino administration. He was a member of the prestigious group called the Free Legal Assistance Group or FLAG, the oldest and largest group of human rights lawyers in the country.

On October 22, 1987, Bueno was assassinated by two men on a motorcycle wearing fatigue uniforms – considered to be part of a wave of assassinations that included the murder of activist Lean Alejandro and labor leader Rolando Olalia. This coincided with the 1986-87 coup d'état that tried to remove Corazon Aquino from power following the 1986 People Power Revolution.

He was honored in 2010 by having his name inscribed on the wall of remembrance at the Philippines’ Bantayog ng mga Bayani, which honors the heroes and martyrs who fought against Ferdinand Marcos and his martial law regime.

== See also ==
- Bantayog ng mga Bayani
- Rolando Olalia
- Lean Alejandro
