= Pinto Underwater Sculpture Museum =

Art museum in Ilocos Norte, Philippines

- Established: 2023
- Location: Poblacion Bay, Currimao, Ilocos Norte, Philippines
- Type: Underwater art museum
- Collection size: 16 sculptures/artworks
- Founders: Pintô Art Museum; Currimao municipal government
- Curator: Carlomar Daoana
- Owner: Joven Cuanang

The Pinto Underwater Sculpture Museum for Marine Ecosystem Regeneration is located in Currimao, Ilocos Norte's Poblacion Bay, in the Philippines.

== Background ==
A project of the Pintô Art Museum and Filipino neurologist Joven Cuanang in cooperation with the Office of the Second Congressional District of Ilocos Norte led by House of Representatives member Angelo Marcos Barba, the underwater museum is the very first of its kind in the northern part of the Philippines.

The underwater museum was launched on May 1, 2023, at Barangay Poblacion in Currimao, Ilocos Norte, Philippines with the help of the Philippine Navy, the Philippine Coast Guard, the 4th Marine Brigade of the Philippine Marines, the Philippine Air Force TOG 1, and the Philippine Army.

Pinto and the Second Congressional District of Ilocos Norte coordinated with the Municipality of Currimao, the Mariano Marcos State University's College of Aquatic Sciences and Applied Technology, the Bureau of Fisheries and Aquatic Resources, the Department of Environment and Natural Resources, the Philippine Ports Authority, and the Provincial Government of Ilocos Norte.

The operation started as early as mid-April 2023 when all the sculptures were shipped from different parts of the country to Sitio Remedios, the home of Cuanang in the province of Ilocos Norte. His niece Kathleen Dacanay Lagustan, a supplies management expert, was in charge of getting all 20 sculptures together in one place.

By the time half of the sculptures arrived at Sitio Remedios in Currimao, Congressman Barba called in Bam Sevilla and the rest of the congressional team for a meeting. Environmental Policy Analyst Sigrid Salucop and special operations expert Ralph Atienza Mckenzie, were also involved in the submersion operations.

All of the sculptures were moved from Sitio Remedios on April 30, 2023, through a company owned by Erik Franco. The boom truck and payloader then waited for the landing craft BRP Waray to dock at the Port of Currimao. By the early morning of May 1, 2023, BRP Waray, along with the boom truck, payloader, and sculptures, sailed for Poblacion Bay. A program was held at the fish port for the underwater museum's launch. The heavy landing craft was escorted by three boats crewed by the Philippine Coast Guard. The coast guard also ferried tactical divers from the Philippine Navy, master divers from the coast guard, and divers from the Philippine Army. The submersion operation continued until the afternoon of May 2, 2023.

== Collection ==
The underwater museum's collection is curated by Carlomar Daoana, Ateneo de Manila University arts department head. It consist of 16 sculptures and other artworks by 20 artists which ranges from 400 to 2,500 kilograms (880 to 5,510 lb). They were submerged at a depth of 3.05 meters (10.0 ft) and placed in waters 1.5 kilometers (0.93 mi) away from the shoreline. They are meant to function as artificial reefs.
