= Jose Garvida Flores =

José Garvida Flores (December 9, 1900 – August 12, 1944) was an Ilocano poet, playwright and lawyer from Bangui, Ilocos Norte, Philippines. He graduated from Philippine Law School in 1932.

Flores was known for his contributions to Ilocano literature, particularly in poetry and drama. His published works include Wayawaya ken Sabsabali a Dandaniw (“Liberty and a Collection of Poems”), Pitik Ti Puso (“Heartbeat”), Kaanunto (“When Will It Be”), and Tanda Ti Ayanayat (“In Remembrance of Love”). He also wrote plays such as Dagiti Ayayat ni Dr. Rizal (“The Many Loves of Dr. Rizal”) and Ayat Iti Ili ken Dadduma Pay a Drama (“Love of Country and Other Dramas”).

In addition to his literary work, Flores contributed articles to various publications in multiple languages. He wrote in Ilocano for periodicals such as Bannawag and Ti Bagnos, in English for The Tribune, and in Spanish for La Lucha and El Norte. He also served as editor-in-chief of the Ilocano newspaper Dangadang, which he co-published with fellow Ilocano cleric and politician Santiago S. Fonacier.

== Literary works ==
=== Poetry ===
- Filipinas, Nadayag a Filipinas (Philippines, Beloved Philippines) – this literary piece is sung during Independence Day, and during ceremonies at the Iglesia Filipina Independiente (Philippine Independent Church).
- No Awan Siit, Awan Balangat (If There is No Thorn, There is No Crown)
- Pitik Ti Puso - Napili a Dandaniw a Mairukney iti Daga a Nakayanakan; Dandaniw iti Nalibuos a Filipina Maipapan iti Natanok a Biag (Heartbeat - Selected Poems Dedicated to the Land of Birth; A Poem about a Charming Filipina of Good Moral Values) / 29p, Laoag, I.N. 1928
- Wayawaya ken Sabsabali a Dandaniw (Liberty and A Collection of Poems) / 24p, Dangadang, Bangui, I.N. 1931
- Kaanunto (When Will It Be)
- Tanda Ti Ayanayat (In Remembrance of Love)

=== Dramas / Plays / Zarzuela Ilocana ===
- Teriang, a colourful village maiden's life which hit local theatres because of its natural and well-organized dialogue.
- Ayat Iti Ili ken Dadduma Pay a Drama (Love of Country and Other Dramas) / with English translation
- Dagiti Ayayat ni Dr. Rizal - Maipabuya a Putar ni José Garvida Flores (The Many Loves of Dr. Rizal - Play written by José Garvida Flores) / 51p, Dangadang, Manila 1940

=== Translations ===
Rudyard Kipling’s If— and José Rizal’s Mi Último Adios both into the Ilokano/Ilocano language, among many others.

== 20th–21st century legacy ==
Some of his works are now listed and kept in Philippine eLib, a collaborative project of the National Library of the Philippines (NLP), University of the Philippines (UP), Department of Science and Technology (DOST), Department of Agriculture (DA), and the Commission on Higher Education (CHED).

During his term as congressman, the late Rep. Antonio Raquiza passed a bill to rename Sentinella Hill in Bangui as José Garvida Flores Park (its construction was initiated and government-funded but was never completed and recognized as such).

Wayawaya Ken Sabsabali a Dandaniw, is featured at the Museo Ilocos Norte in Laoag City, Ilocos Norte, Philippines.

== Personal life ==
Flores was born in Bangui, Ilocos Norte, to Rufo Manegdeg Flores, a former presidente (municipal chief executive), and Maria Agullana Garvida. He was the sixth of seven children and the only son. He later met Rosalina Lauyan Apostol (1909-1955), a teacher from Batac, Ilocos Norte, who graduated from the Philippine Normal School in 1933 and was assigned to teach in Bangui. They were married on December 27, 1934, and had four children. His nephew, Soliman Ganno, later became the seventh supreme bishop of the Iglesia Filipina Independiente.
