= Pintô Art Museum =

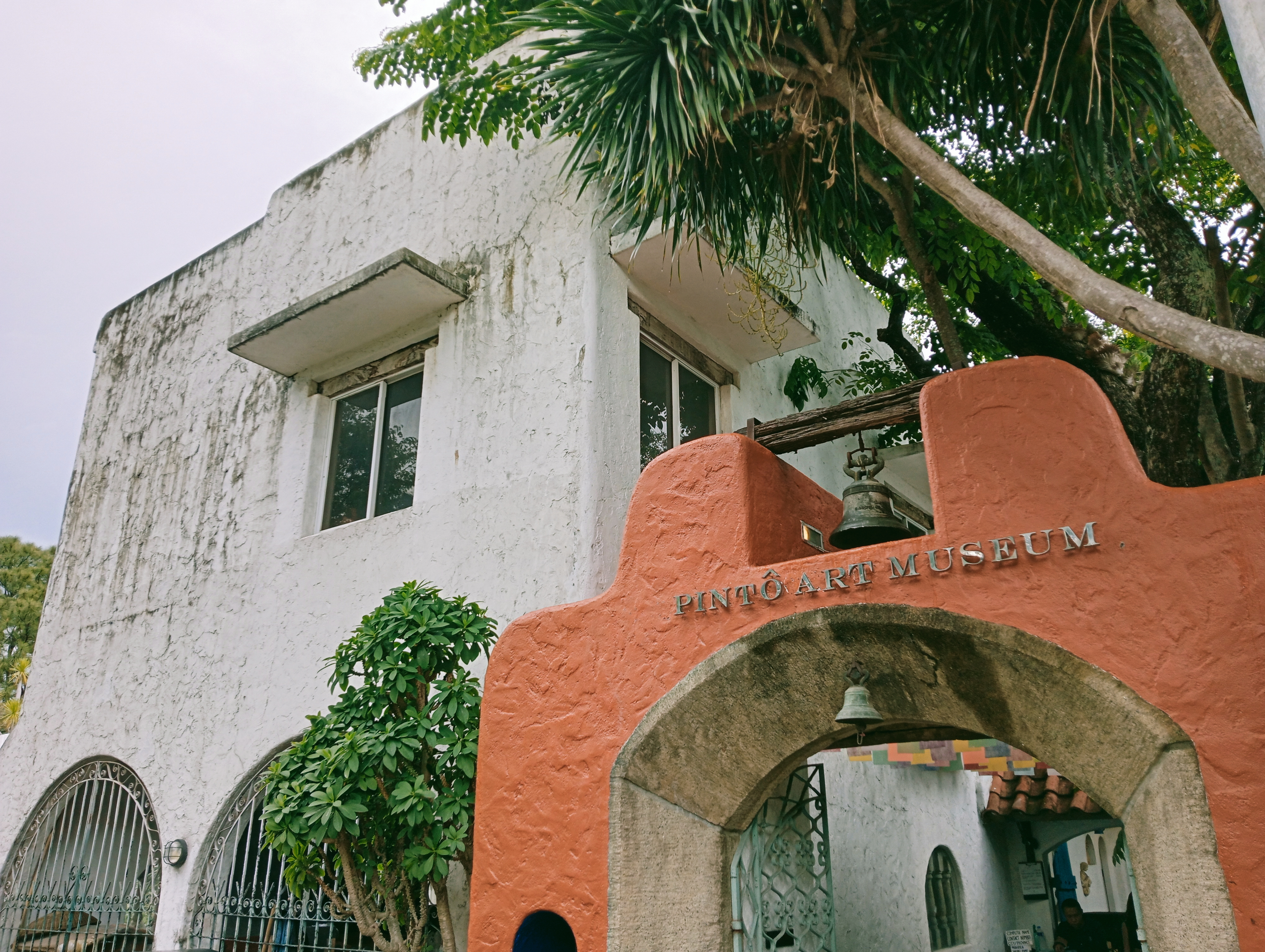
- Main entrance of the museum
- Established: 2010 (Note: Established in 2000 as the Pinto Art Gallery. Established as a museum in 2010.)
- Location: Antipolo, Rizal, Philippines
- Coordinates: 14°34′51.8″N 121°09′50.3″E
- Type: Art museum
- Collections: Contemporary; Indigenous
- Founder: Joven Cuanang
- Owners: Silangan Foundation for the Arts, Culture, and Ecology
- Website: www.pintoart.org

The Pintô Art Museum is a contemporary art museum complex in Antipolo, Rizal, Philippines.

== History ==
Joven Cuanang, a former doctor who was a chief medical officer at the St. Luke's Medical Center – Global City, would buy a house and lot in Antipolo that would later be associated with the Pintô Art Museum in the 1970s. Cuanang would open the Pinto Gallery around the year 2000 and in 2010, he would found the Pintô Art Museum. The museum is linked to Cuanang being a patron of local Antipolo artists – particularly the amateur art troupe, named Saling Pusa. During the 1990s, he would exhibit the local Antipolo artists' works on a clothesline which became known as "Sampayan Art".

The museum would be run under the Silangan Foundation for the Arts, Culture, and Ecology. The group was co-established by Cuanang as the Antipolo Foundation for Arts, Culture, and Ecology after the People Power Revolution of 1986.

== Museum ==
The Pintô Art Museum consists of six buildings and stands on 12,000 square meters (130,000 sq ft) of land at the Grand Heights subdivision in Antipolo, Rizal. The buildings are not air-conditioned and rely on open-air ventilation to preserve its collection. Tony Leaño, a Saling Pusa member designed the buildings in an organic and eclectic style. (Note: With bahay na bato, Spanish colonial, American pueblo and mission architecture, Greek and Balearic houses named as inspiration for the eclectic architecture style.)

The complex has two museums – one for contemporary art and another for indigenous art. It has an academy for literature, visual and performing arts. Pintô also has a cafe, an arboretum. The 2000 square meter arboretum has 500 indigenous plant species as of 2021.

The museum hosts the collection of Joven Cuanang. Works of Saling Pusa members would be featured in the museum.

Its largest exhibition space for contemporary art is Gallery 7 which opened in January 2020.

== Gallery ==
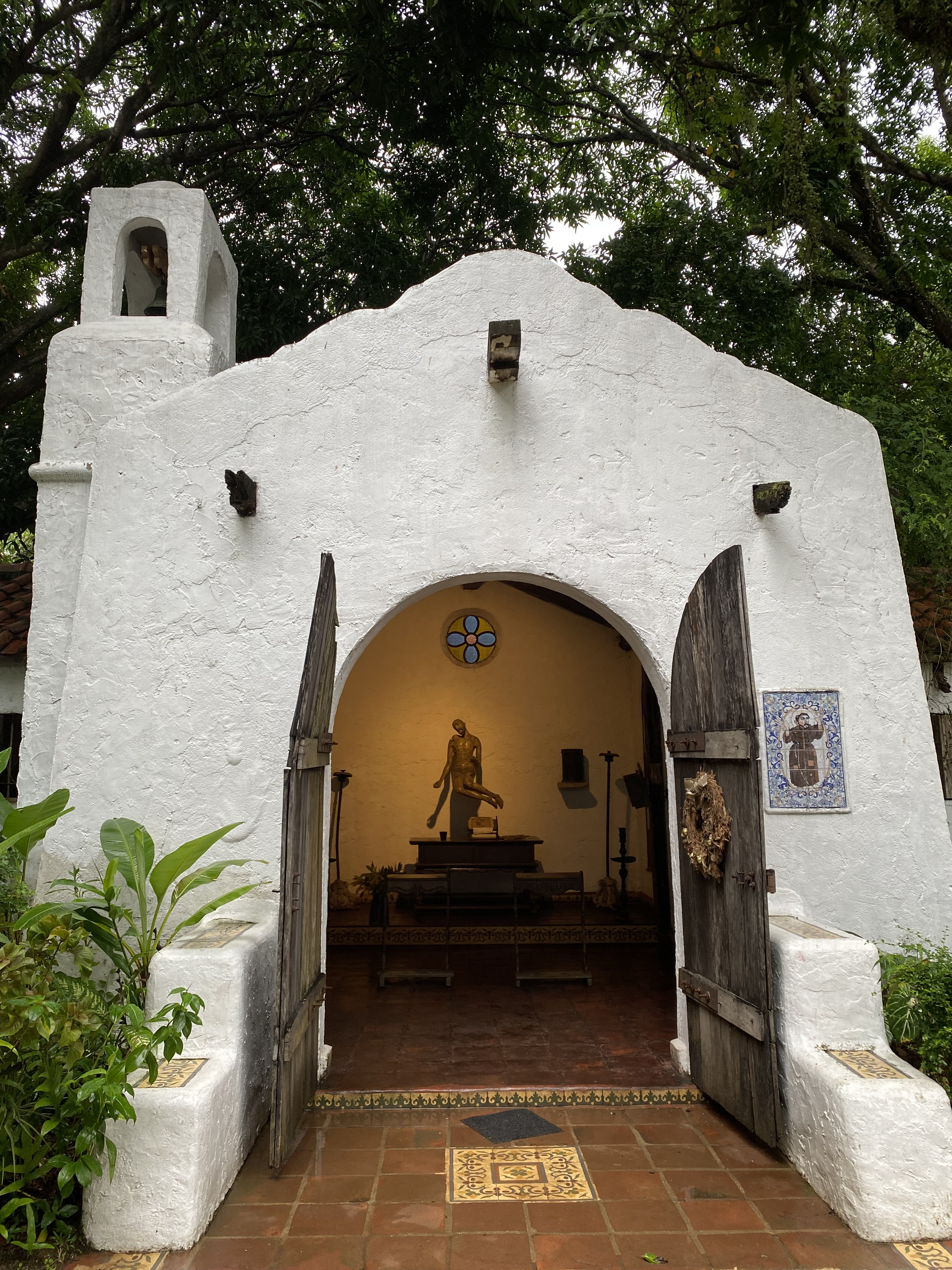
Chapel

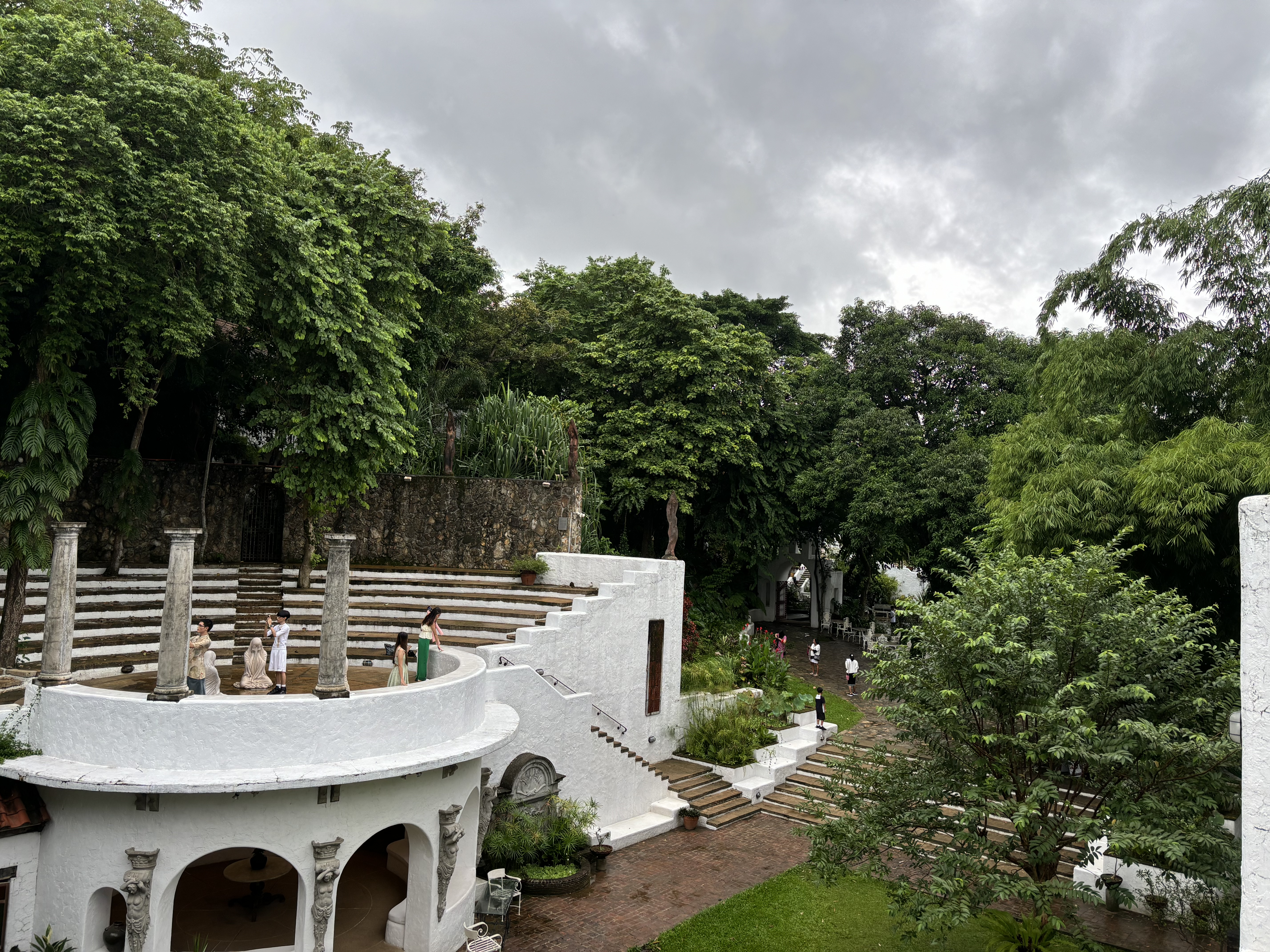
Amphitheater

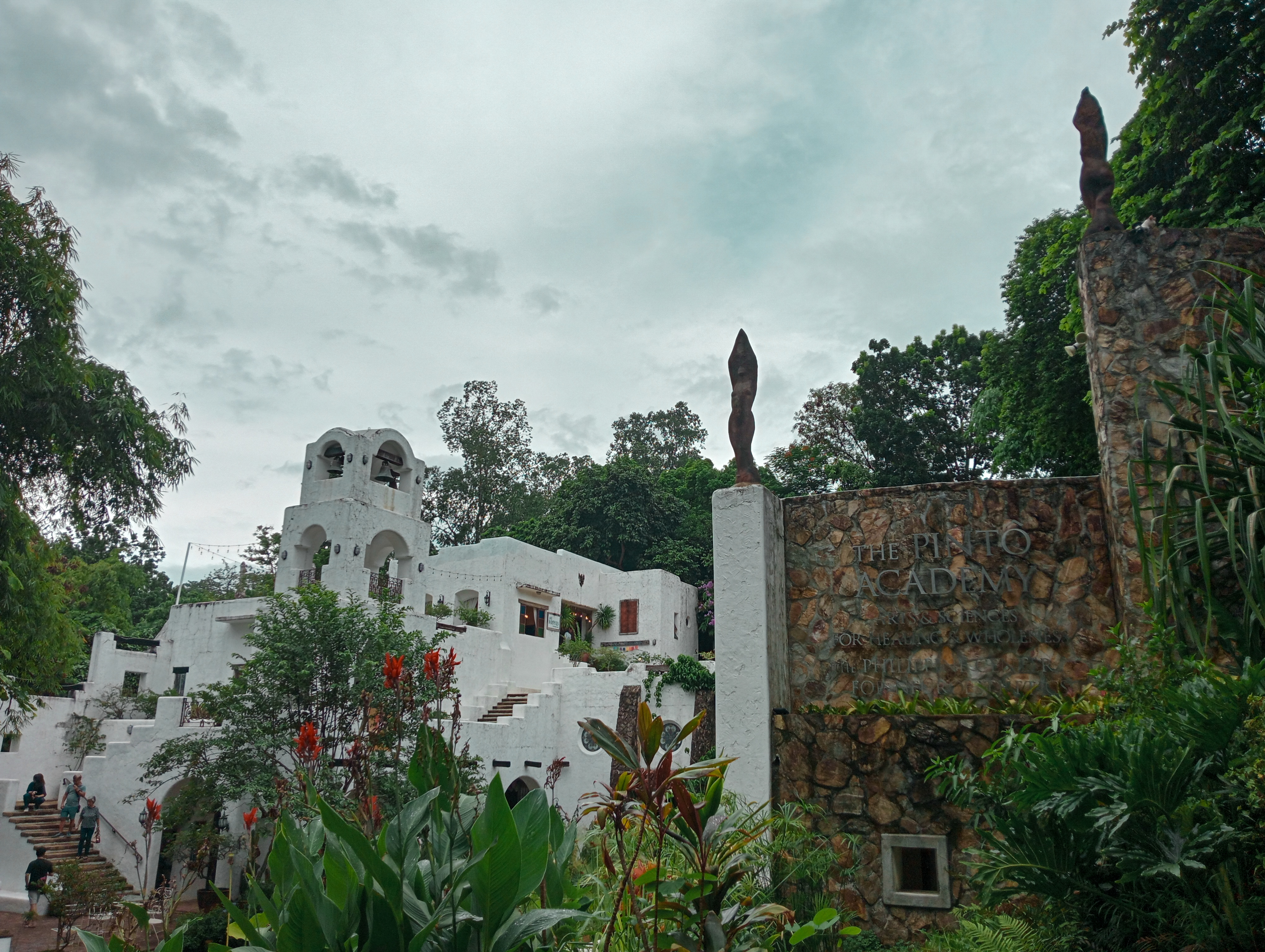
The Pinto Academy

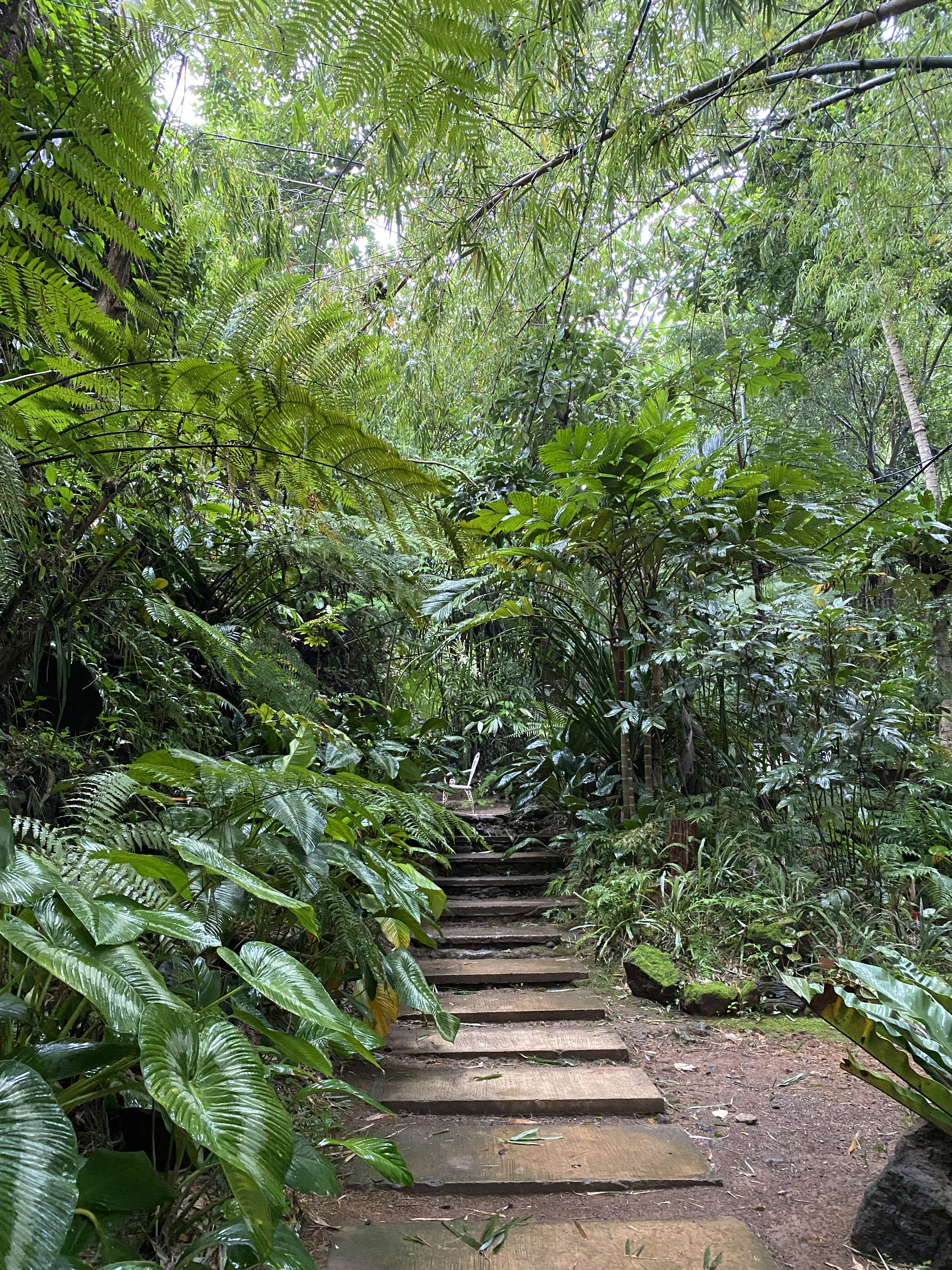
Arboretum

== See also ==
- Pinto Underwater Sculpture Museum
