= Ricarte Puruganan =

Filipino painter

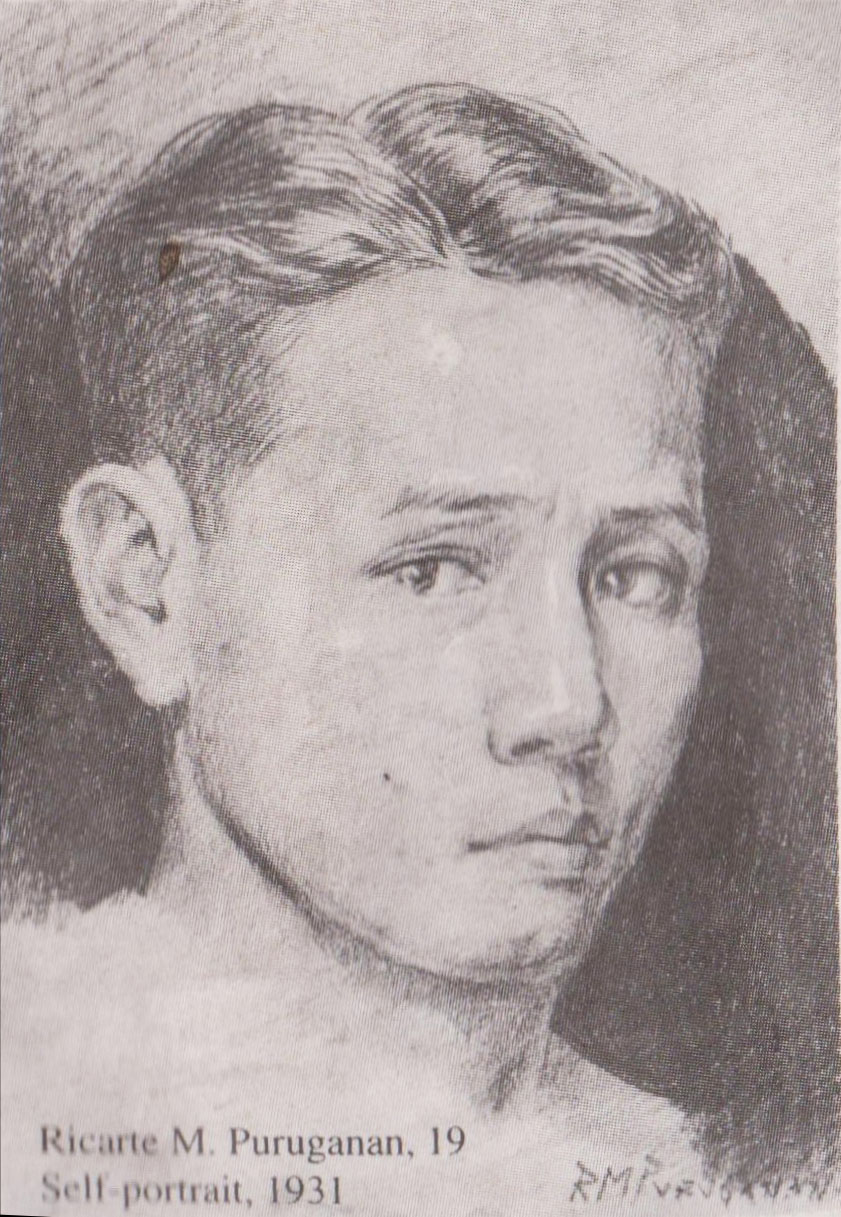

Ricarte Madamba Puruganan (November 20, 1912 – January 15, 1998) was a Filipino painter.

He was born in Dingras, Ilocos Norte. He is the first of six children of Honorio S. Puruganan, a musician, composer, poet and painter, and Victoria M. Puruganan, a school teacher and housewife. Puruganan trained at the University of the Philippines school of fine arts.

Puruganan is regarded as "One of the Thirteen Moderns", a group of artists that broke away from the Conservatives, led by Fernando Amorsolo. His paintings were exhibited side by side with those of the other masters: Juan Luna, Felix Resurreccion Hidalgo, Fabian de la Rosa, Amorsolo, Victorio C. Edades, Vicente Manansala, Hernando R. Ocampo & Cesar Legaspi. The other side of Ricarte Puruganan's artistry is manifested by the 60 existing government and private edifices, sculptures and landscapes which he undertook during his 25 years of self-imposed exile from the art scene of Manila starting 1950. During those years, he spent communing with his ancestral town of Dingras, Ilocos Norte. Which is why we see in many of his paintings those scenes closest to his heart – the rustic, the indigenous; quaint seascapes and evocative agricultural.(*)

== Education ==
- 1920 - 1927 Dingras Elementary School
- 1927 - 1931 Ilocos Norte National High School
- 1931 - 1936 School of Fine Arts, University of the Philippines “Diploma in Painting”
- 1939 - 1941 College of Fine Arts and Architecture, University of Santo Tomas,(Degree Bachelor of Fine Arts)

== Honors as a student and a faculty member ==
- At UP - Awarded 6 Medals (first prize), 25 honorable mentions, and two special prizes from the President of University and from the School Director, and named “Most Distinguished Graduate” of the year.
- Elected School Representative to the UP Student Council.
- Elected Class Representative to the UP Senior Council.
- Appointed ‘Chief – Artist’ of the 1936 Philippinensian.
- At UST - Awarded “Full Scholar” for two years on the basis of maintaining excellent grades on every academic subject every semester
- Appointed Instructor, School of Fine Arts, 1937
- Appointed Assistant Professor, College of Fine Arts and Architecture, 1946
- Appointed Associate Professor, 1948–1950

== Achievements as a professional artist ==
- 1935 – Painting, “Coming Storm”, 1st Prize Winner. National Landscape Painting Competition, sponsored by the Philippine Vistas Gallery, Intramuros Manila.

2nd Prize Winner – Anita Magsaysay-Ho
3rd Prize Winner – Vicente Manansala
4th Prize Winner – Arsenio Capili

- 1937 - “Salty Breeze”, First Prize, Third Annual Art Exhibition, sponsored by the UP President's Committee on Culture, Up Manila.
- 1938 - “Inauguration of the Philippine Commonwealth”, Second Prize, National Historical Painting Contest occasioned by celebration of Dr. Jose Rizal’s Birthday in Calamba Laguna, sponsored by UP.
- 1943 - “Bull-Fight”, First and Second Prizes, first National Art Contest, Escolta Manila, under the auspices of the Japanese sponsored Philippine Government.
- 1943 - “One December Morning” (a portrayal of Dr. Jose Rizal and his vision as he fell) First Prize, Literary and Art contest, City Foundation day Celebration, Manila.
- 1944 - “Mass Burial of the Heroes at Capas” and “Railroad Scene” were among five finalists in the second National Art Contest held at Escolta Manila, under the auspices of the Japanese sponsored by the Philippine Government, but were disqualified from the final judgement for Strong Anti-Japanese Sentiment (issued in Mallari's article, “Moderns on Parade”, was published in the Philippine Review magazine in 1944)
- 1949 – “Adobe Stone” Third Prize, Second Annual National Art Competition sponsored by the Art Association of the Philippines, Manila, 1949.
- 1949 – “Neighbors” First Prize, “Suburban” Third Prize and “Father and Son” Honorable Mention. These three prizes were awarded during the semi-annual National Art Competition jointly sponsored by the Manila Club and the Art Association of the Philippines, Manila 1949.
