= List of power plants in the Philippines =

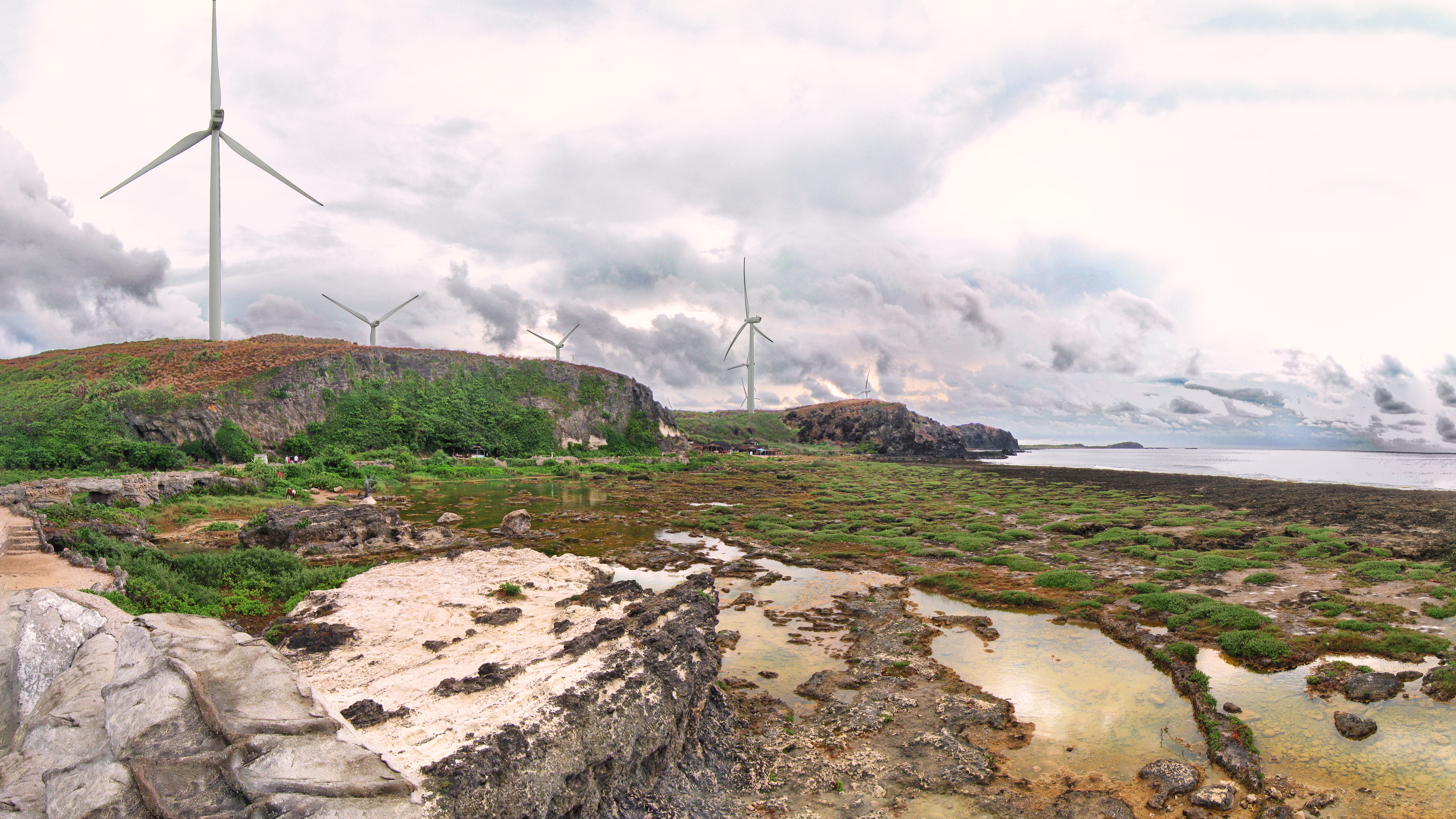
Burgos Wind Farm in Burgos, Ilocos Norte

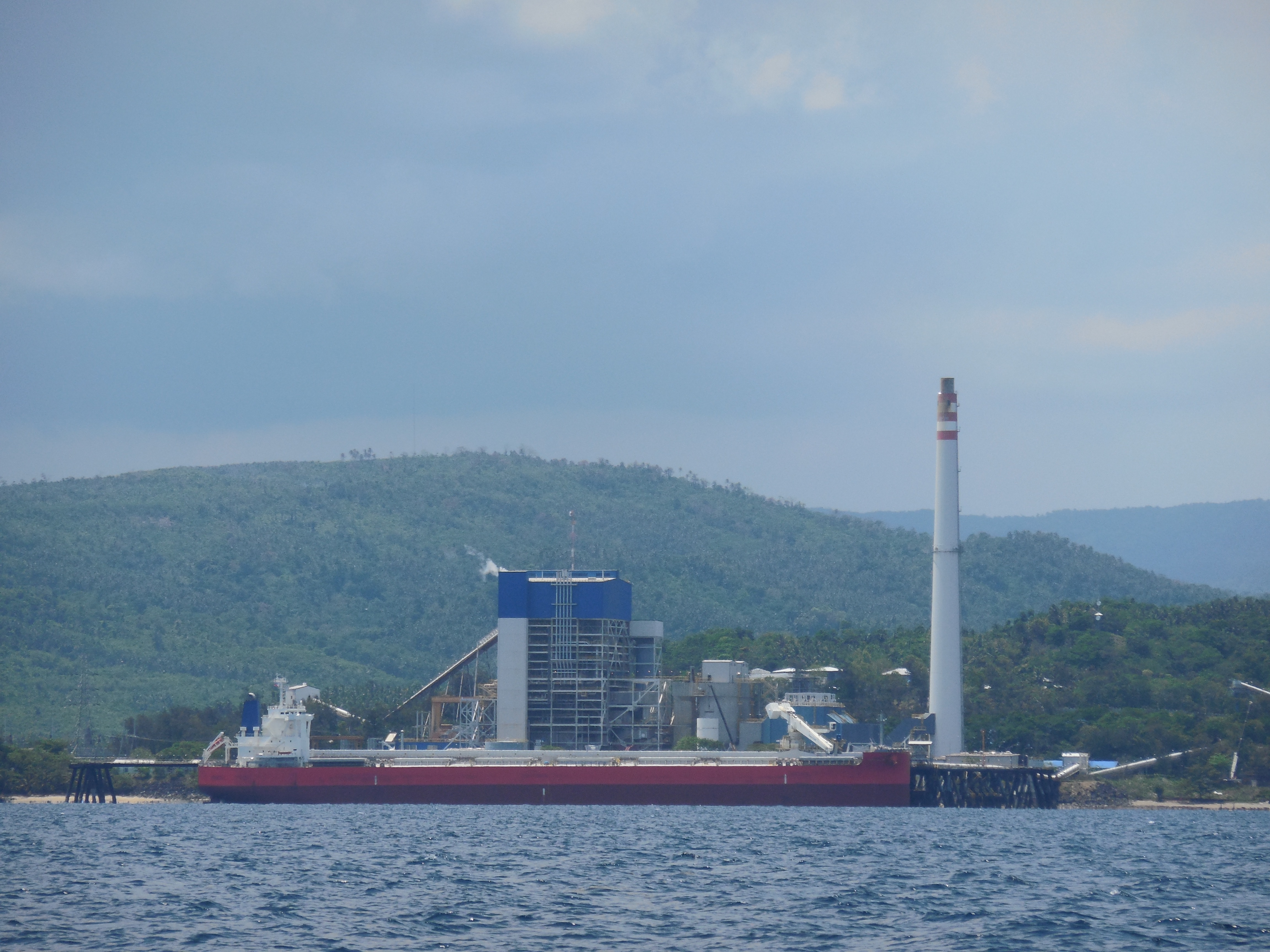
Coal-fired Quezon Power Plant in Mauban, Quezon

This is an incomplete list of power plants present in the Philippines.

== Renewable energy ==
=== Hydropower ===
Station	Community	Coordinates	Capacity (MW)	Operator	Commissioned	Ref
Agus 1 Hydroelectric Power Plant	Marawi, Lanao del Sur		80.00		1994	
Agua-Grande Hydroelectric Power Plant	Pagudpud, Ilocos Norte	18°34′13.7″N 120°53′57.7″E	80.00	Ilocos Norte Electric Cooperative	1983	
Angat Hydro Electric Power Plant	Norzagaray, Bulacan	14°52′15″N 120°08′30″E	218	National Power Corporation	1967	
Magat Hydro Electric Power Plant	Ramon, Isabela	16°49′30″N 121°27′14″E	360	National Power Corporation	1982	
Agus 6 Hydroelectric Power Plant	Iligan		200.00		1953, 1977	
Agusan 2 Hydroelectric Power Plant	Damilag, Manolo Fortich, Bukidnon	8°21′9″N 124°46′8″E	1.60	First Gen Corporation	1957	
Ambuklao Hydroelectric Power Plant	Bokod, Benguet		105.00		2011	
Lon-oy Hydro	Lon-oy, San Gabriel, La Union		3.60		1993	
Talomo Hydro 2B	Brgy. Mintal, Davao City		0.30		2005	
Talomo Hydro 3	Brgy. Catalunan Pequeño, Davao City		1.92		2005	
Sabangan Hydro	Sabangan, Mountain Province		14.00		2015	
Linao Cawayan Mini-Hydro Power Plant	Oriental Mindoro		3.00		2014	
Pantabangan-Masiway Hydroelectric Power Plant	Pantabangan town, Nueva Ecija		132		1977	
Lake Mainit Hydro Power Plant	Jabonga, Agusan del Norte	9°20′56″N 125°29′04.4″E	24.9	Agusan Power Corporation	2023	
Asiga Hydro Power Plant	Santiago, Agusan del Norte	9°15′50″N 125°36′31.6″E	8	Asiga Green Energy Corporation	2023	
Siguil River hydropower plant					2023	
SUWECO HDPP	Catanduanes	13.7089° N, 124.2422° E	3.6	Sunwest Water & Electric Co., Inc.	2010	

=== Geothermal ===
Station	Community	Coordinates	Capacity (MW)	Commissioned	Notes	Ref
BacMan Geothermal Production Field (Energy Development Corporation)	Sorsogon City, Sorsogon	13°03′16.9160″N 123°57′55.6333″E	150 (Total)	1979	Produces steam for BacMan 1 and 2 power plants. Total 150 MW	
BacMan 1 Geothermal Power Station (Energy Development Corporation)	Sorsogon City, Sorsogon	13°03′16.9160″N 123°57′55.6333″E	120	1993	Steam is from BacMan Geothermal Production Field	
BacMan 2 Geothermal Power Station (Energy Development Corporation)	Sorsogon City, Sorsogon	13°03′16.9160″N 123°57′55.6333″E	20	1995	Steam is from BacMan Geothermal Production Field	
Leyte Geothermal Production Field Energy Development Corporation	Kananga, Leyte and Ormoc, Leyte	11°8′30.1693″N 124°37′11.9608″E	0	1975	Produces steam for Malitbog, Mahanagdong, Upper Mahiao and Leyte Optimization Power Plants. 588.4 MW total	
Malitbog Geothermal Power Station	Malitbog, Tongonan, Kananga, Leyte	11°9′7″N 124°38′58″E	232.5	1996	Steam is from Leyte Geothermal Production Field	
Upper Mahiao Geothermal Power Station	Limao, Kananga, Leyte	11°10′25.0889″N 124°37′40.2938″E	125	1996	Steam is from Leyte Geothermal Production Field	
Mahanagdong Geothermal Power Station	Ormoc, Leyte	11°10′25.0889″N 124°37′40.2938″E	180	1997	Steam is from Leyte Geothermal Production Field	
Leyte Optimization Geothermal Power Station	Tongonan and Limao, Kananga, Leyte	11°10′25.0889″N 124°37′40.2938″E	50.9	1997	Steam is from Leyte Geothermal Production Field	
Tongonan Geothermal Power Plant	Limao, Kananga, Leyte	11°10′25.0889″N 124°37′40.2938″E	112.5	1982	Steam is from Leyte Geothermal Production Field	
Mindanao Geothermal Production Field (Energy Development Corporation)	Mount Apo, Kidapawan, Cotabato	7°00′47.9819″N 125°13′07.6865″E	0	1987	Produces steam for Mindanao 1 and 2 power plants. Total 106 MW	
Mindanao 1 Geothermal Power Plant	Mount Apo, Kidapawan, Cotabato	7°00′47.9819″N 125°13′07.6865″E	52	1997	Steam is from Mindanao Geothermal Production Field	
Mindanao 2 Geothermal Power Plant	Mount Apo, Kidapawan, Cotabato	7°00′47.9819″N 125°13′07.6865″E	54	1999	Steam is from Mindanao Geothermal Production Field	
Northern Negros Geothermal Production Field (Energy Development Corporation)	Murcia, Negros Occidental	10°28′55.3483″N 123°05′58.8563″E	0		Decommissioned	
Southern Negros Geothermal Production Field (Energy Development Corporation)	Valencia, Negros Oriental	9°17′14.6317″N 123°14′20.9170″E	0	1983, 1993 – 1994, 1995	Produces steam for Palimpinon 1 & 2, Nasulo geothermal powerplants. Total 221.9 MW	
Palinpinon 1 Geothermal Power Plant	Valencia, Negros Oriental	9°17′14.6317″N 123°14′20.9170″E	112.5	1983, 1993 – 1994, 1995	Steam is from Southern Negros Geothermal Production Field	
Palinpinon 2 Geothermal Power Plant	Valencia, Negros Oriental	9°17′14.6317″N 123°14′20.9170″E	80	1983, 1993 – 1994, 1995	Steam is from Southern Negros Geothermal Production Field	
Nasulo Geothermal Power Plant	Valencia, Negros Oriental	9°17′14.6317″N 123°14′20.9170″E	49.4	2015	Steam is from Southern Negros Geothermal Production Field	
Tiwi Geothermal Power Plant	Tiwi, Albay	13°27′56″N 123°38′55″E	275	1979	Philippine Geothermal Production Company, Inc.	
Maibarara Geothermal Power Plant	Santo Tomas, Batangas		20	2014		
Makiling-Banahaw (Mak-Ban) Geothermal Power Plant	Brgy. Bitin, Bay, Laguna	14°5′17″N 121°13′35″E	480	1979, 1980, 1984, 1996	Philippine Geothermal Production Company, Inc.	
Ampiro Geothermal Power Project	Misamis Occidental		(30)		Proposed	
Mt. Sibulan-Kapatagan Geothermal Power Project	Davao del Sur		(300)		Proposed	
Balatukan-Balingasag Geothermal Prospect	Balingasag, Misamis Oriental		(40)		Proposed	
Lakewood Geothermal Prospect	Lakewood, Zamboanga del Sur		(40)		Proposed	
Montelago Power Plant	Oriental Mindoro		44	2016		
Biliran Geothermal Plant	Biliran		(49)	2016	Under construction	

=== Wind power plants ===
Station	Community	Coordinates	Capacity (MW)	Commissioned	Notes	Ref
Burgos Wind Farm	Burgos, Ilocos Norte	18°30′58″N 120°38′46″E	150	2014		
Mindoro Wind Farm	Puerto Galera, Oriental Mindoro	18°31′40″N 120°42′50″E	48		Under construction	
Bangui Wind Farm	Bangui, Ilocos Norte	18°31′40″N 120°42′50″E	33	2005		
Caparispisan Wind Farm	Pagudpud, Ilocos Norte	18°36′17″N 120°47′54″E	81	2014		
Balaoi and Caunayan Wind Farm	Pagudpud, Ilocos Norte		160		Under construction	
San Lorenzo Wind Farm	San Lorenzo, Guimaras	10°25′36″N 122°41′32″E	54	2014		
Sibunag Wind Farm	Sibunag, Guimaras		40		Proposed	
Pililla Wind Farm	Pililla, Rizal		54	2015	Operational	
Nabas Wind Farm	Nabas, Aklan		36	2015		
Sembrano Wind Farm	Pililla, Rizal		72		Under construction	

=== Biomass power ===
Station	Community	Coordinates	Capacity (MW)	Commissioned	Notes	Ref
North Negros BioPower	Manapla, Negros Occidental		24.9	2019	Operational	
CLEAN GREEN Energy Corp.	Bagac, Bataan		12	2017	Operational	
Green Power Panay Phil. Inc.	Mina, Iloilo		35	2016	Under construction	
Green Power Bukidnon Phil. Inc.	Maramag, Bukidnon		35	2016	Under construction	
Green Power Alcala Phil. Inc.	Alcala, Cagayan		35	2016	Under construction	
Kalilangan Biomass Energy Corporation	TBA (Mindanao)		10	2017	Under construction	
Don Carlos Biomass Energy Corporation	TBA (Mindanao)		10	2017	Under construction	
Misamis Oriental Biomass Energy Corporation	Misamis Oriental		12	2017	Under construction	
Aseagas Corporation	Lian, Batangas		8.8	2015	Ceased Operation	
San Carlos BioPower	San Carlos, Negros Occidental		19.9	2015		
Isabela Biomass Energy Corporation	Alicia, Isabela		18	2015		
Asea One Power	Aklan, Panay		42	2014		

== Non-renewable ==
=== Coal ===
Station	Community	Coordinates	Capacity (MW)	Commissioned	Ref
Sual Power Station	Sual, Pangasinan	16°6′24″N 120°5′17″E	1294	1999	
AES Corp.	Masinloc, Zambales	15°34′02″N 119°55′22″E	600	1998	
EGCO Group	Mauban, Quezon	14°13′45″N 121°45′18″E	511	2000	
San Buenaventura Power Ltd. Co. Supercritical Coal Power Plant	Mauban, Quezon	14°13′45″N 121°45′18″E	500	2018	
Tokyo Electric Power Marubeni	Pagbilao, Quezon	13°53′35″N 121°44′42″E	728	1996	
Pagbilao Energy Corporation	Pagbilao, Quezon	13°53′35″N 121°44′42″E	420	2018	
Mariveles Coal-Fired Power Plant	Mariveles, Bataan	14°25′21″N 120°32′15″E	651.6	2013	
Calaca Power Station (DMCI Holdings)	Calaca, Batangas	13°55′49″N 120°47′19″E	600	1984, 1995	
Calaca Power Station (SLTEC)	Calaca, Batangas	13°55′08.7″N 120°49′36.7″E	270	2014	
SMC Limay Power Plant	Limay, Bataan	14°31′11.5″N 120°36′12.5″E	600	2017	
APEC Power Station	Mabalacat, Pampanga	15°14′08″N 120°36′37″E	50	2006	
Toledo Power Corp. (Metrobank)	Toledo, Cebu		246	1993	
KEPCO-SPC Power Plant	Naga, Cebu		200	2011	
STEAG Power Plant (Steag GmbH)	Villanueva, Misamis Oriental		232	2006	
Lanao Kauswagan Power Station	Kauswagan, Lanao del Norte		552	2019	
PEDC Coal Fired Power Plant	La Paz, Iloilo City		167.4		
Therma South Inc. Coal Fired Power Plant	Brgy. Binugao, Toril District, Davao City		300	2015	
Sultan Energy Philippines Corp.	Sultan Kudarat		200	2012	
SMI Power Corp.	Malalag, Davao del Sur		500	2016	
Therma Visayas Inc.	Cebu		300		

=== Diesel ===
Station	Community	Coordinates	Capacity (MW)	Commissioned	Ref
Bohol Diesel Power Plant	Tagbilaran, Bohol		11	1978, 1986, 1996	
SPC Cebu Diesel Power Plant	Naga, Cebu		43.8	1994	
Cebu Private Power Corporation	Cebu City		43.8	1994	
Panay Diesel Power Plant	Iloilo City		74.9	1999	
CELCOR Power Plant	Cabanatuan, Nueva Ecija		26.5	1996	
Western Mindanao Power Corporation	Brgy. Sangali, Zamboanga City	7°04′58.4″N 122°12′56.9″E	100	1997	
Bauang Diesel Power Plant	Bauang, La Union		215	1994	
Subic Diesel Power Plant	Subic Bay Freeport Zone		116	1994	
SUWECO DPP	Catanduanes		14	2019	
Therma Marine Inc. - Mobile 1	San Roque, Maco, Davao de Oro		100	1994	
Therma Marine, Inc. - Mobile 2	Santa Ana, Nasipit, Agusan del Norte		100	1994	

=== Natural gas ===
Station	Community	Coordinates	Capacity (MW)	Commissioned	Ref
Avion Close Open Cycle Power Plant	Batangas City	13°46′16.7344″N 121°01′33.8733″E	97	2016	
Ilijan Combined-Cycle Power Plant	Batangas City	13°37′19″N 121°04′47″E	1200	2000	
Limay Combined Cycle Gas Turbine Power Plant	Limay, Bataan	14°32′33.8″N 120°35′55.4″E	620	1993	
San Gabriel Combined Cycle Power Plant	Batangas City	13°46′16.7344″N 121°01′33.8733″E	414	2016	
San Lorenzo Combined Cycle Power Plant	Batangas City	13°46′16.7344″N 121°01′33.8733″E	500	2002	
Santa Rita Combined Cycle Power Plant	Batangas City	13°46′16.7344″N 121°01′33.8733″E	1000	1997	

=== Nuclear ===
Station	Community	Coordinates	Capacity (MW)	Commissioned	Notes	Ref
Bataan Nuclear Power Plant	Morong, Bataan	14°37′45″N 120°18′49″E	621	N/A	Completed but never operated.	

== See also ==
- Geothermal power in the Philippines
- List of power stations in Asia
- List of largest power stations in the world
