= Renewable energy in the Philippines =

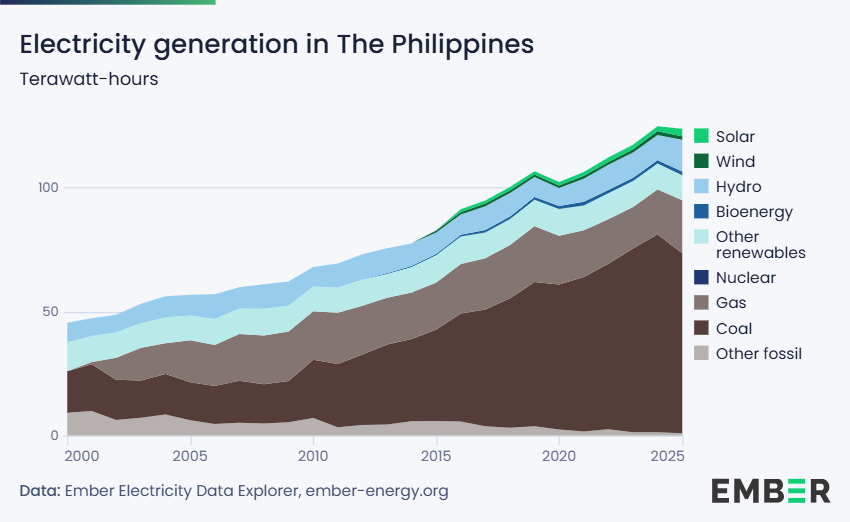
Electricity generation in the Philippines in terawatt-hours

As of 2023, renewable energy sources accounted for about 22% of the Philippines' total installed electricity generation capacity, according to the Department of Energy. The Philippines remains a net importer of fossil fuels, which underscores the government's push to expand local renewable energy options. Available renewable resources include hydropower, geothermal power, wind power, solar power, and biomass power. The government has implemented a range of policies and targets aimed at increasing the contribution of renewables to the country's overall energy mix.

The Philippine government has committed to increasing the share of renewables to 50% of total installed power capacity by 2030, equivalent to about 15.3 gigawatts (GW). This target is aligned with the country's nationally determined contribution (NDC) under the Paris Agreement, which aims to reduce greenhouse gas emissions by up to 75% by 2030.

== Background ==
Philippine energy policy aims to reduce reliance on fossil fuels because of air pollution, climate risks, and exposure to volatile import prices. Key statutes supporting renewable energy include the Electric Power Industry Reform Act of 2001 (Republic Act No. 9136); the Biofuels Act of 2006 (RA 9367); the Renewable Energy Act of 2008 (RA 9513); and the Climate Change Act of 2009 (RA 9729).

Renewable energy implementation is important to the Philippines for several reasons. The geographic characteristics of the country make it vulnerable to the adverse effects of climate change. Rising sea levels are a threat because the Philippines is an archipelago with many cities located in coastal areas. As the coastline recedes due to rising seas, coastal cities become vulnerable to flooding. Climate change has also been linked to changing weather patterns and extreme weather events.

Reliance on fossil fuels is detrimental to the energy security of the Philippines. The Philippines is a net importer of fossil fuels. In 2012, the Philippines imported 20 million tons of coal. Eight million tons were produced domestically. In 2010, the Philippines imported 54 million barrels of oil and produced 33,000 barrels. Given this dependence on imported coal and oil, the Philippines is vulnerable to price fluctuations and supply constraints.

The Philippine Department of Energy wrote:

The harnessing and utilization of renewable energy comprises a critical component of the government's strategy to provide energy supply for the country. This is evident in the power sector where increased generation from geothermal and hydro resources has lessened the country's dependency on imported and polluting fuels. In the government's rural electrification efforts, on the other hand, renewable energy sources such as solar, micro-hydro, wind and biomass resources are seeing wide-scale use.

== Sources ==
The Philippines utilizes renewable energy sources including hydropower, geothermal and solar energy, wind power and biomass resources. In 2013, these sources contributed 19,903 GWh of electrical energy, representing 26.44 percent of the country's electricity needs. Among the renewable energy sources available in the country, geothermal shows to be the cheapest and most (economically) attractive energy source followed by wind, hydropower, and lastly, solar PV.

Renewable electricity production (GWh) by source
Year	Geothermal	Hydropower	Biomass	Solar	Wind	Total renewables	Total electricity	Renewables % of electricity production
2003	9,822	7,870	0	0	0	17,692	52,941	33.42%
2004	10,282	8,593	0	0	0	18,875	55,957	33.73%
2005	9,902	8,387	0	2	17	18,308	56,568	32.36%
2006	10,465	9,939	0	1	53	20,459	56,784	36.03%
2007	10,215	8,563	0	1	58	18,836	59,612	31.60%
2008	10,723	9,834	0	1	61	20,620	60,821	33.90%
2009	10,324	9,834	14	1	64	20,237	61,934	32.68%
2010	9,929	9,788	27	1	62	19,807	67,743	29.24%
2011	9,942	7,803	115	1	88	17,950	69,176	25.95%
2012	10,250	10,252	183	1	75	20,761	72,922	28.47%
2013	9,605	10,019	212	1	66	19,903	75,266	26.44%
2014	10,308	9,137	196	17	152	19,809	77,261	25.64%
2015	11,044	8,665	367	139	748	20,963	82,413	25.44%
2016	11,070	8,111	726	1,097	975	21,979	90,798	24.21%
2017	10,270	9,611	1,013	1,201	1,094	23,189	94,370	24.57%
2018	10,435	9,384	1,105	1,249	1,153	23,326	99,765	23.38%

=== Hydroelectric plants ===
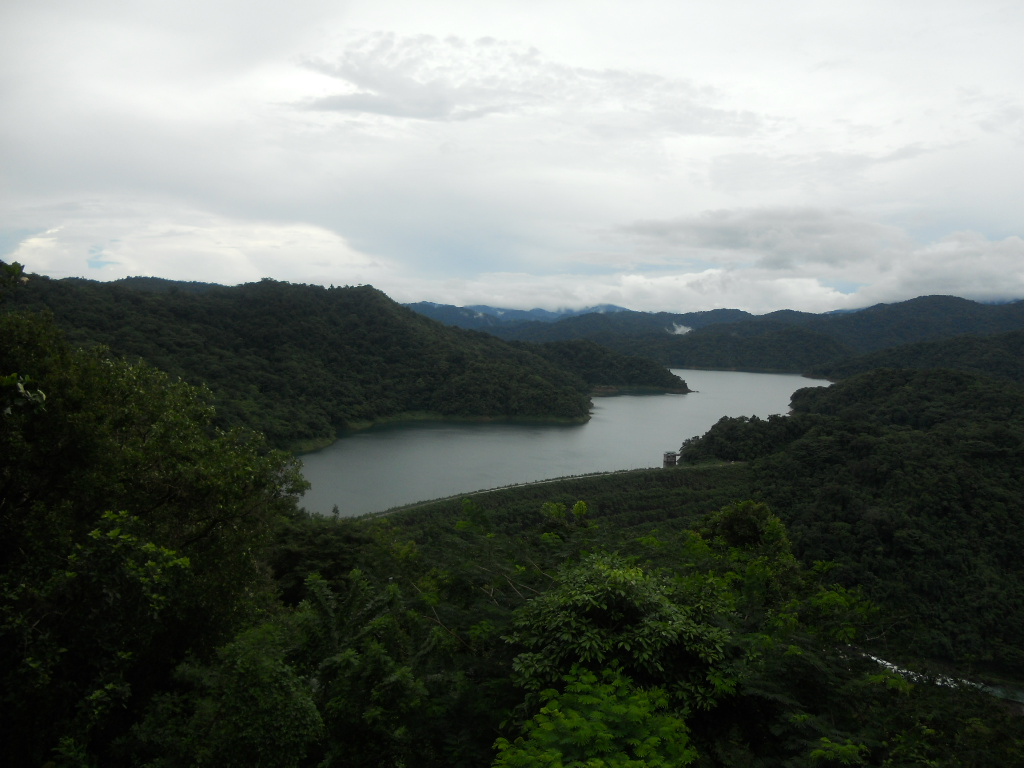
Angat Dam, a major hydropower facility in the Philippines

Hydropower is one of the main sources of renewable energy in the Philippines. There are hydroelectric plants of both the conventional dam and run-of-the-river types in the country. Of twenty-nine hydroelectric plants, fourteen are conventional dam and fifteen are run-of-the-river systems. Hydropower accounts for 11.8% of the energy generation and 17-18% of installed capacity in the Philippines.

Many areas of the Philippines are suitable for hydroelectricity production. However, hydroelectricity production in the Philippines can cause upstream and downstream flooding during monsoonal weather and when excess water is released from dams. Hydropower integration also has the potential to disturb pre-existing natural ecosystems and cultures as well as cause land dispossession and community resettlement. The methods of using geographic information system (GIS) and remote sensing (RS) to determine suitable sites for constructing hydroelectric plants do not tend to incorporate social or environmental considerations. In response to the construction of large scale hydroelectric infrastructure, opposition movements have arisen. Anti-dam organizations and protests may advocate for indigenous peoples, environmental conservation, anti-capitalism, or anti-imperialism. Vocal environmental human rights defenders have been red-tagged by the government or extrajudicially killed by the military or police. The rights, concerns, and political agency of indigenous peoples trying to protect their villages and sacred sites from being submerged have often been disregarded due to urban-centric economic development.

Incorporating small scale plants, especially micro-hydroelectric plants that have a capacity of less than 0.1 MW (100 kW), may mitigate adverse side effects and be a cost-effective way to bring electricity to rural and off-the-grid communities. Isolated mountain communities have seen improvements in education, community engagement, and economy due to improved lighting provided by micro-hydropower.

Hydropower output of the Philippines
	2004	2005	2006	2007	2008	2009	2010	2011	2012	2013	2014	2015
Hydropower output (GWh)	8,593	8,387	9,939	8,563	9,834	9,788	7,803	9,698	10,252	10,019	9,137	8,665
Percentage change		(2.40%)	18.50%	(13.84%)	14.84%	(0.47%)	(20.28%)	24.29%	5.71%	(2,27%)	(8.80%)	(5.45%)

Major hydropower sites
Facility name	Type	Installed capacity (MW)	Location	Owner	Year commissioned
San Roque	Dam	411.0	Pangasinan	San Roque Power Corporation	2003
HEDCOR	Run-of-river	33.8	Benguet	HEDCOR	1993
Kalayaan PSPP	Dam	739.2	Laguna	CBK Power Company Ltd.	1998/2004
Magat	Run-of-river	360.0	Isabela	Aboitiz Power	1983
Caliraya	Dam	35.0	Laguna	CBK Power Company Ltd.	1942/1947/1950
Botocan	Run-of-river	22.8	Laguna	CBK Power Company Ltd.	1967/1986
Angat	Dam	246.0	Bulacan	PSALM	1967/1986
Pantabangan-Masiway	Dam	132.0	Nueva Ecija	First Gen Hydro Power Corp.	1977/1981
Ambuklao	Dam	105.0	Benguet	Aboitiz Power	1957
Binga	Dam	132.0	Benguet	Aboitiz Power	1960
Bakun	Run-of-river	70.0	Ilocos Sur	Luzon Hydro Corp.	2000/2001
Casecnan	Dam	165.0	Nueva Ecija	CE Casecnan Water & Energy Co.	2002
Sabangan	Run-of-river	13.2	Mt. Province	HEDCOR	2015
NIA-Baligtan	Run-of-river	6.0	Isabela	NIA	1987
JANOPOL	Run-of-river	5.2	Bohol	BOHECO I	1992
AGUS 1	Dam	80.0	Lanao del Sur	PSALM	1992
AGUS 2	Dam	180.0	Lanao del Sur	PSALM	1992
AGUS 4	Dam	55.0	Lanao del Norte	PSALM	1985
AGUS 5	Dam	200.0	Lanao del Norte	PSALM	1985
AGUS 6	Dam	54.0	Lanao del Norte	PSALM	1953/1971
AGUS 7	Dam	255.0	Lanao del Norte	PSALM	1983
Pulangi IV	Run-of-river	232.0	Bukidnon	PSALM	1985/1986
Sibulan HEP	Run-of-river	42.6	Davao del Sur	HEDCOR	2010
Agusan	Run-of-river	1.6	Bukidnon	FG Bukidnon Power Corp.	1957
Bubunawan	Run-of-river	7.0	Bukidnon	BPC Inc.	2001
Cabulig HEP	Run-of-river	9.2	Misamis Oriental	Mindanao Energy Systems	2012
Talomo HEP	Run-of-river	4.5	Davao del Sur	HEDCOR	1998
Tudaya 1	Run-of-river	6.6	Davao del Sur	HEDCOR	2014
Tudaya 2	Run-of-river	7.0	Davao del Sur	HEDCOR	2014

=== Geothermal power ===
In the Philippines, geothermal energy is used to generate electricity. Two types of technologies are used in the Philippines. These are firstly, the higher temperature flash steam method and secondly, the lower temperature binary cycle method. In the Philippines, the first is the more common. The second is used only at the MAKBAN plant. Geothermal plants are suitable for areas with low winds, such as Mindanao, and areas that have rainy weather, such as Batanes. Geothermal energy production can result in the release of toxic substances such as mercury, hydrogen sulfide, arsenic and selenium. In 2014, at a geothermal plant in Biliran, eight plant workers were hospitalized with hydrogen sulphide poisoning.

Geothermal energy output
	2004	2005	2006	2007	2008	2009	2010	2011	2012	2013	2014	2015
Geothermal power output (GWh)	10,282	9,902	10,465	10,215	10,723	10,324	9,929	9,942	10,250	9,605	10,308	11,044
Percentage change		(3.70%)	5.69%	2.39%	4.97%	(3.72%)	(3.83%)	(0.13%)	3.10%	(6.29%)	7.32%	7.14%

Major geothermal sites
Facility name	Type	Installed capacity (MW)	Location	Owner	Year commissioned
MAKBAN	Flash/binary	442.8	Laguna	AP Renewable Inc.	1979
BACMAN	Flash	130.0	Sorsogon	Bac-Man Geothermal Inc.	1993
Tiwi	Flash	234.0	Albay	AP Renewable Inc.	1979
MANITO-Lowland	Flash	1.5	Albay	Bac-Man Geothermal Inc.	No date
MAIBARARA	Flash	20.0	Batangas	Maibarara Geothermal Inc.	2014
Palinpinon GPP	Flash	192.5	Negros Oriental	Green Core Energy	1983
Leyte	Flash	112.5	Leyte	Green Core Energy	1983
Unified Leyte	Flash	610.2	Leyte	Energy Development Corp.	1996/1997
Nasulo GPP	Flash	50.0	Negros Occidental	Energy Development Corp.	2014
Mt. Apo	Flash	103.0	North Cotabato	Energy Development Corp.	1996

=== Solar power ===
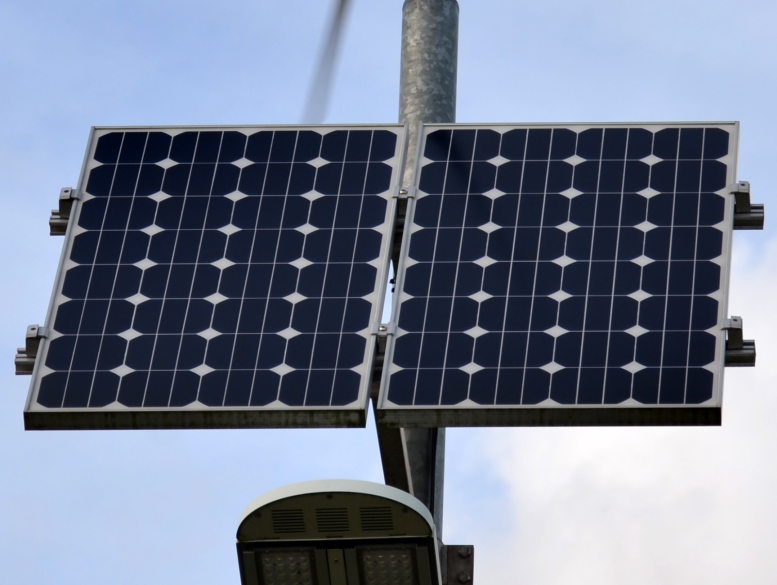
Photovoltaic solar cell

The Philippines receives some of the highest levels of solar irradiance in Southeast Asia, with average daily values reaching over 7 kWh/m^{2} in April and around 3 kWh/m^{2} in December, based on measurements in 33 cities nationwide.

In 2019, solar power accounted for about 1.2% of the country's total installed generation capacity of 23 GW. Government projections indicate that solar could reach at least 3.5% of a forecast 43 GW by 2040. In 2019, a 2.16 MWp commercial rooftop solar project in Calamba, Laguna, developed by PROINSO and Solaren Renewable Energy Solutions, was awarded the Asian Power Awards "Solar Power Project of the Year".

By the end of 2024, Department of Energy data recorded 2,312 MW of installed solar photovoltaic (PV) capacity, driven by both utility-scale facilities and distributed systems in the commercial and residential sectors. The International Renewable Energy Agency (IRENA) reported 1.7 GW of capacity earlier in the year, reflecting continuing growth in the sector.

Major planned developments include the Meralco Terra Solar Farm, with a projected capacity of over 700 MW, which will contribute to the expansion of utility-scale solar generation in the country.

As of 2025, commercial PV systems are increasingly adopted by businesses, farms, schools, and local government facilities, contributing to reductions in daytime peak demand and offsetting grid electricity costs.

In the commercial rooftop segment, a 2.16 MWp installation in Calamba, Laguna received the Asian Power Awards' 2019 "Solar Power Project of the Year – Philippines".

Major solar power sites
Facility name	Type	Installed capacity (MW)	Location	Owner	Year commissioned
Tarlac-2	Photovoltaic	20	Tarlac, Tarlac	PetroSolar Corp.	2019
Tarlac-1	Photovoltaic	50	Tarlac, Tarlac	PetroSolar Corp.	2016
Majestic	Photovoltaic	41.3	Cavite	Majestic Power Corp.	2015
Pampanga Solar	Photovoltaic	10.0	Mexico, Pampanga	Raslag Corp.	2015
Burgos Solar	Photovoltaic	4.0	Burgos, Ilocos Norte	Solar Philippines	2015
CEPALCO Solar PV	Photovoltaic	1.0	Cagayan de Oro, Misamis Oriental	CEPALCO	2004
Valenzuela – Isla	Photovoltaic	8.6	Valenzuela, Metro Manila	Valenzuela Solar Energy Inc.	2015
Valenzuela – Tagalag	Photovoltaic	20.69	Valenzuela, Metro Manila	Eco-Park Energy of Valenzuela Corporation	2019

Solar, wind, and biomass energy output
	2005	2006	2007	2008	2009	2010	2011	2012	2013	2014	2015
Solar, wind, and biomass output (GWh)	19	55	59	63	79	90	205	259	279	364	1,254
Percentage change		189.47%	7.27%	6.78%	25.40%	13.92%	127.78%	26.34%	7.72%	30.66%	244.50%

=== Wind power ===
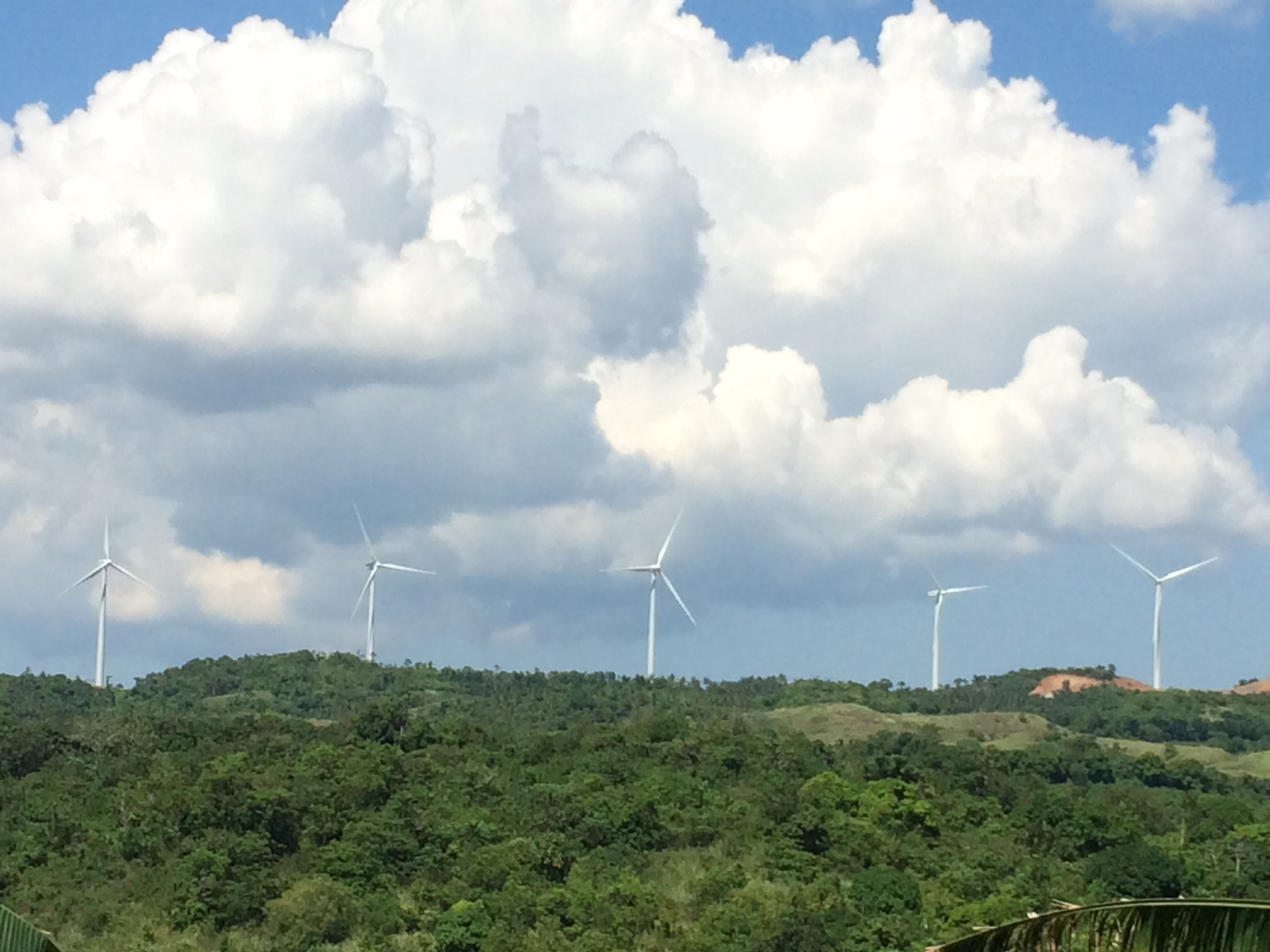
Pililla wind farm

As of the end of 2023, the Philippines had 427 MW of installed wind power capacity, according to the Department of Energy. Most wind power sites are onshore facilities, with Ilocos Norte hosting the country's first large-scale wind farms. Other projects, such as the Pililla Wind Farm in Rizal and the Bangui Wind Farm in Ilocos Norte, have also become popular tourist destinations.

On March 13, 2024, German wind and solar developer wpd GmbH announced plans to invest ₱392.4 billion in the Philippines to establish offshore wind farms in Cavite, Negros Occidental, and Guimaras. The undertaking, registered with the Board of Investments (BOI) in 2023, represents the largest renewable energy investment of its kind in the country. According to the BOI, the projects in Cavite and Negros (1 & 2) will have a combined capacity of 3,260 MW and an estimated value of ₱400 billion.

Major wind power sites
Facility name	Type	Installed capacity (MW)	Location	Owner	Year commissioned
Bangui Wind Farm Power Phase 1 and 2	On-shore	33.0	Ilocos Norte	North Wind Power Development Corp.	2005
Bangui Wind Farm Power Phase 3	On-shore	18.9	Ilocos Norte	North Wind Power Development Corp.	2014
Burgos Wind Farm	On-shore	150.0	Ilocos Norte	EDC	2014
Carispisan Wind	On-shore	81.0	Ilocos Norte	North UPC	2014
Pililla Wind Farm	On-shore	54.0	Rizal	Alternegy Philippine Holdings Corp.	2015
TAREC	On-shore	54.0	Guimaras	TAREC	2014
NABAS Wind Phase 1	On-shore	36.0	Aklan	PWEI	2015

=== Biomass power ===
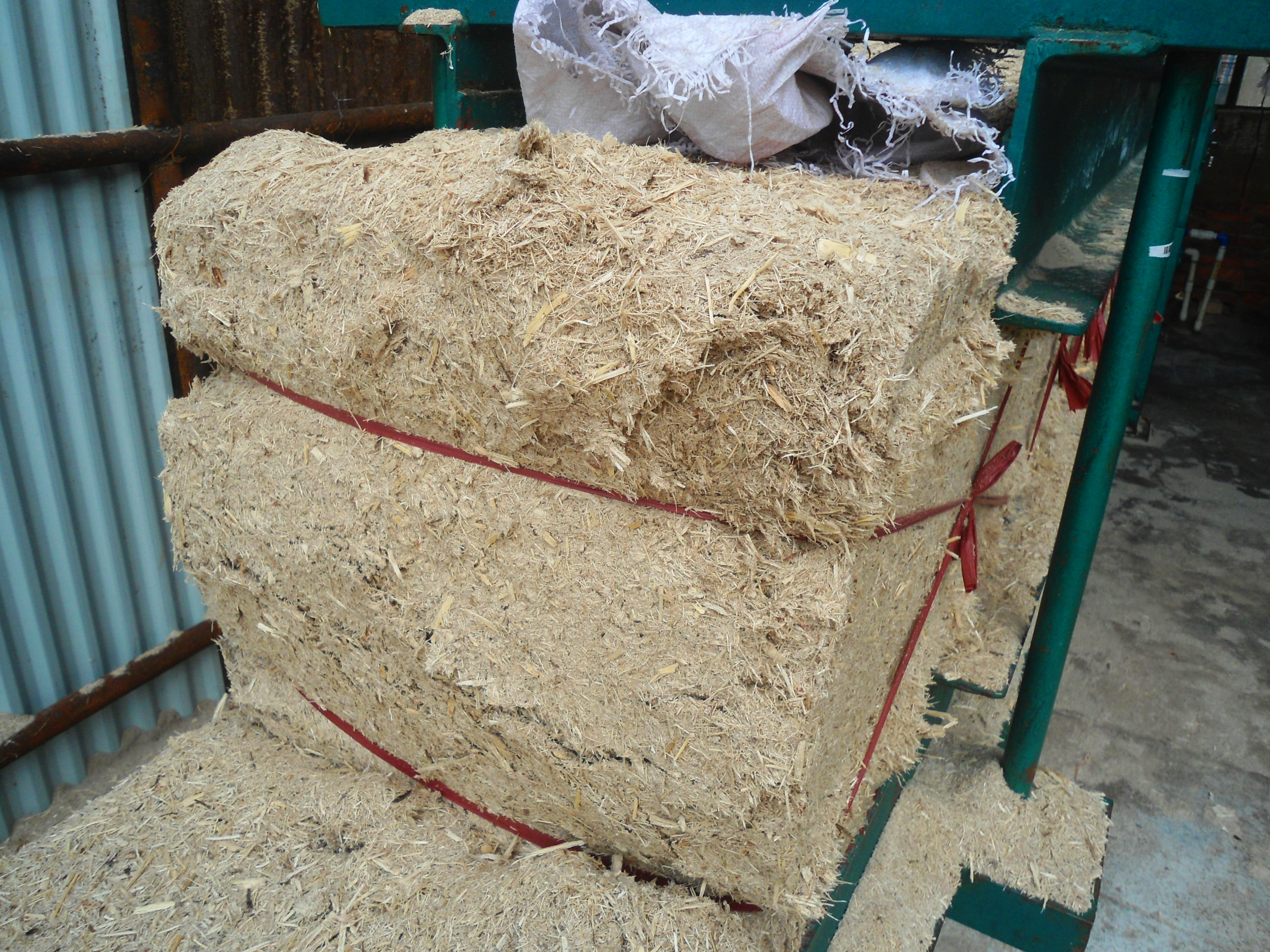
Bagasse, a kind of biomass fuel

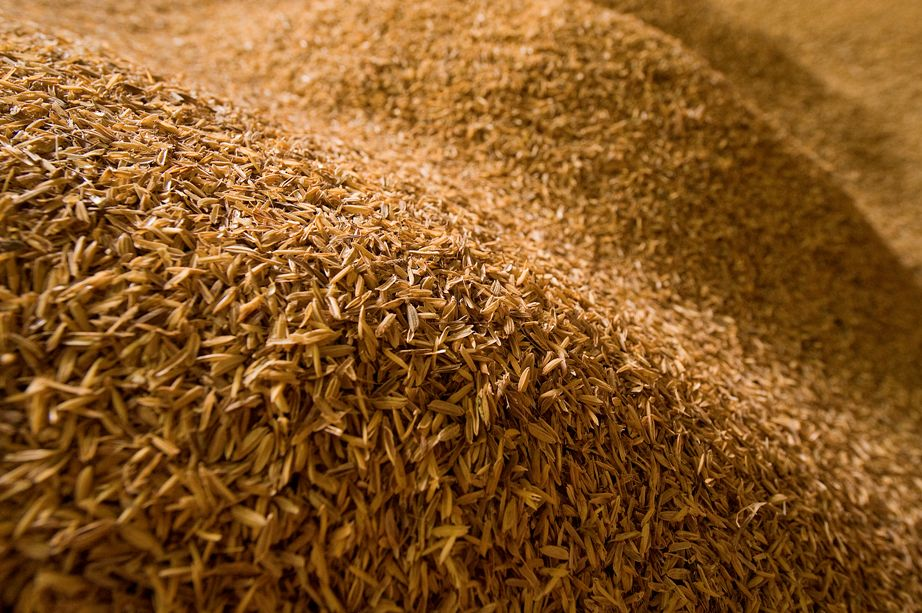
Rice husks

Biomass energy refers to energy derived from plant and animal sources. Biomass resources are abundant in the Philippines due to its large agricultural industry. Bagasse, rice husks, and coconut husks are used to generate power. The Philippines also uses biogas from landfill as a biomass energy source. The availability of biomass can be affected by events such as drought.

Major biomass power sites
Facility name	Type	Installed capacity (MW)	Location	Owner	Year commissioned
Green Future	Bagasse	19.8	Isabela	Green Future Innovation Inc.	2014
5JC Power	Rice husk	12.0	Nueva Ecija	I Power Corp.	2015
Montalban LFG	Landfill gas	9.3	Rizal	Montalban Methane Power Corp.	2009
Laguna LFG	Landfill gas	4.2	Laguna	Bacavalley Energy Inc.	2011
Lucky PPH	Bagasse	4.0	Isabela	Lucky PPH International Inc.	2008
Pangea	Landfill gas	1.2	Metro Manila	Pangea Green Energy Phil Inc.	2013

== Legislation ==
The Philippine government has passed four laws that seek to improve the state of renewable energy. These are the Electric Power Industry Reform Act of 2001 (RA 9136); the Biofuel Act of 2006 (RA 9367); the Renewable Energy Act of 2008 (RA 9513); and the Climate Change Act of 2009 (RA 9729).

The Electric Power Industry Reform Act (2001) (EPIRA) promotes the use of renewable energy particularly through private sector investment. However, after a decade of EPIRA's enactment, advocacy groups and lawmakers said the law only strengthened monopolies and caused electricity rates to double.

The Biofuels Act (2006) documents state policy to reduce the Philippines' dependence on imported fossil fuels. It encourages investment in biofuels through incentives including reduced tax on local or imported biofuels; and bank loans for Filipino citizens engaged in biofuel production. The law resulted in the formation of the National Biofuel Board (NBB).

The Renewable Energy Act (2008) legislates state policy to accelerate the development and use of renewable energy resources. Under this act (section 6), mandated a minimum percentage of generation of electricity from renewable sources (a renewable portfolio standard (RPS)). Also under this act (section 7), a feed-In tariff system was implemented for electricity produced from renewable sources, giving producers the security of long term fixed prices. Electricity utilities make net metering agreements with qualified end-users of renewable energy systems. A minimum percentage of electricity from renewable sources for the off-grid missionary electrification system was also mandated.

Under the Renewable Energy Act (2008), incentives are available to developers of renewable energy. These incentives include an income tax holiday for the first seven years of the entity's commercial operations; duty-free importation and special realty tax rates on renewable energy machinery, equipment and materials within the first ten years; net operating loss carry-over; zero percent Value-Added Tax (VAT) rate for the sale of fuel or power generated from renewable sources of energy; and Tax Credit on domestic capital equipment and services.

The Climate Change Act (2009) legislated state policy to incorporate a gender-sensitive, pro-children and pro-poor perspective in all climate change and renewable energy efforts.

== Feed-in tariff program statistics ==
FIT Monitoring Board summary
Resource	For nomination / Conversion		With Certificate of Confirmation of Commerciality		With Certificate of Endorsement to ERC	
Resource	No. of projects	Capacity (MW)	No. of projects	Capacity (MW)	No. of projects	Capacity (MW)
Hydro	–	–	66	610.93	4	26.60
Wind	7	1,023.55	5	431.00	6	393.90
Solar	18	681.30	30	892.54	6	131.90
Biomass	–	–	4	24.37	11	94.25
Total	25	1704.85	105	1,958.84	27	646.65

FiT degression
RE technology	Proposed FiT ($/kWh)*	Approved FiT ($/kwh)*	Degression rate
Solar	0.407	0.220	6% after 1 year from effectivity of FiT
Wind	0.235	0.193	0.5% after 2 years from effectivity of FiT
Biomass	0.159	0.150	0.5% after 2 years from effectivity of FiT
Run-of-river hydro	0.139	0.134	0.5% after 2 years from effectivity of FiT
*Based on US$1.00 : PHP 44.00

== Private sector involvement ==
The Renewable Energy Act (2008) encourages the involvement of the private sector in renewable energy production through fiscal and non-fiscal incentives.

Fiscal incentives include tax reductions, as well as funding assistance from both government and third parties. A number of international organizations have expressed willingness to aid Philippine businesses in developing local renewable energy infrastructure including German Technical Cooperation (GTZ), United States Agency for International Development (USAID), Asian Development Bank (ADB), United Nations Development Programme (UNDP), and Japan International Cooperation Agency (JICA). Impediments to private sector investment include high transaction costs, social engineering costs, lack of suitable local technology, and caps on electricity prices made by the Energy Regulatory Commission.

Itemized partial list of required permits, licenses and certificates for RE project application
Required documents issued by the National Government	Required documents issued by the Local Government Units
1. SEC Registration; 2. DOE Certificate/Endorsement; 3. DOE Accreditation; 4. BOI Registration; 5. CSR Approval — Anti-poverty Commission; 6. DENR EPC Certificate; 7. DENR Environmental Certificate (ECC); 8. DENR Permit to Operate; 9. Development Permit (endorsed to LGU); 10. Transfer Certificate of Title (LRB, HLURB); 11. BIR Certified Tax Declaration; 12. ERC Certificate of Compliance; 13. NTC Permit to Purchase; 14. NTC License to operate 15. ERC Compliance to Grid Code; 16. ERC Compliance to Distribution Code; 17. WESM Registration; 18. Right of Way permit 19. Power Purchase Agreements; 20. Certificate of Registration as Importer	1. LGU Endorsements (Governor, Mayor, Councils); 2. Realty Tax; 3. Barangay Clearance to operate 4. Business and Operations Tax; 5. Building permit 6. Real Estate Tax Receipt; 7. Sanitary Permit; 8. Barangay Clearance for Construction; 9. Right of Way permits 10. Water Rights

Renewable energy technology	Issued FIT rate (per kWh)	Proposed rate (per kWh)
Solar	Php 9.68	Php 17.95
Wind	Php 8.53	Php 10.37
Biomass	Php 6.63	Php 7.00
Hydropower	Php 5.90	Php 6.15

=== Public-private partnership ===
As of June 2015, the Department of Energy (DOE) had awarded 646 service contracts as public-private partnerships to private sector entities under the Renewable Energy Law, with an installed capacity of 2,760.52 MW.

Resources	Awarded projects	Installed capacity	Potential capacity
Geothermal	42	1,896.19	750.00
Hydro	407	136.73	7,884.54
Wind	51	426.90	1,168.00
Solar	93	108.90	2,206.51
Biomass	45	191.80	357.00
Ocean energy	8	–	31.00
Total	646	2,760.52	12,397.05

Instances of private sector projects include:

Island group	Resource	Project name	Project proponent
Luzon	Hydropower	Kapangan	Cordillera Hydro Electric Power Corporation
Luzon	Hydropower	Bulanao	DPJ Engineers and Consultants
Luzon	Hydropower	Prismc	PNOC-Renewables Corporation
Luzon	Hydropower	Magat A	Isabela Electric Cooperative, Inc.
Luzon	Hydropower	Magat B	Isabela Electric Cooperative, Inc.
Luzon	Hydropower	Tubao	Tubao Mini-Hydro Electric Corporation
Luzon	Hydropower	Catuiran*	Sta. Clara Power Corp.
Luzon	Hydropower	Inabasan*	Ormin Power, Inc.
Luzon	Solar	San Rafael Solar Power Plant	SPARC Solar Powered AgriRural Communities Corporation
Luzon	Solar	Morong Solar Power Plant	SPARC Solar Powered AgriRural Communities Corporation
Luzon	Solar	Cabanatuan Solar Power Project	First Cabanatuan Renewable Ventures, Inc.
Luzon	Solar	Palauig Solar Power Plant	SPARC Solar Powered AgriRural Communities Corporation
Luzon	Solar	Currimao Solar Photovoltaic Power Project	Mirae Asia energy Corporation
Luzon	Solar	Macabud Solar Photovoltaic Power Project	ATN Philippines Solar energy Group, Inc.
Luzon	Solar	Sta. Rita Solar Power Project	Jobin-Sqm Inc.
Luzon	Solar	YH Green	YH Green
Luzon	Solar	Tarlac Solar Power Project	PetroSolar Corporation
Luzon	Solar	Calatagan Solar Power Project Phase I	Solar Philippines Calatagan Corporation
Luzon	Geothermal	Bacman 3 (Tanawon) Geothermal Project	energy Development Corporation
Luzon	Geothermal	Maibarara 2 Geothermal Project	Maibarara Geothermal Inc.
Luzon	Biomass	2 MW ACNPC WTE Biomass Power Plant Project	Asian Carbon Neutral Power Corporation
Luzon	Biomass	12 MW Biomass Power Plant Project	Green Innovations for Tomorrow Corporation
Luzon	Biomass	5 MW Bicol Biomass energy Corporation	Bicol Biomass energy Corporation
Luzon	Biomass	8.8 MW Biogas Power Plant Project	AseaGas Corporation
Luzon	Biomass	24 MW SJCiPower Rice Husk-Fired Biomass power Plant Project (Phase 1 – 12MW Phase 2 – 12 MW)	San Jose City I Power Corporation
Luzon	Biomass	70 kW Biomass Gasification Power Plant Project*	PowerSource Philippines, Inc.
Visayas	Geothermal	Biliran Geothermal Plant Project	Biliran Geothermal Incorporated
Visayas	Hydropower	Villasiga HEP	Sunwest Water & Electric Co., Inc.
Visayas	Hydropower	Igbulo (Bais) Hydroelectric Power Project	Century Peak energy Corporation
Visayas	Hydropower	Cantakoy	Quadriver energy Corp.
Visayas	Hydropower	Amlan HEPP	Natural Power Sources Integration, Inc.
Visayas	Solar	Miag-ao Solar Power Project	COSMO Solar energy, Inc.
Visayas	Solar	La Carlota Solar Power Project Phase A (SACASOL II-A)	San Carlos Solar energy Inc.
Visayas	Solar	Cadiz Solar Power Project	Phil.Power Exploration & Development Corporation
Visayas	Wind	Nabas Wind Power Project Phase I – 34 Phase II-16	PetroWind energy Corporation
Visayas	Biomass	12 MW Multi-Feedstock Biomass Power Plant Project	Megawatt Clean energy, Inc.
Visayas	Biomass	2.5 MW Rice Husk-Fired Biomass Power Plant Project	Megawatt Clean energy, Inc.
Mindanao	Hydropower	Lake Mainit	Agusan Power Corporation
Mindanao	Hydropower	Puyo Hydroelectric Power Project	First Gen Mindanao Hydropower Corp.
Mindanao	Hydropower	Asiga	Asiga Green energy Corp.
Mindanao	Hydropower	Manolo Fortich I	Hedcor Bukidnon, Inc.
Mindanao	Hydropower	Manolo Fortich 2	Hedcor Bukidnon, Inc.
Mindanao	Solar	Kibawe Solar Power Project	Asiga Green energy Corp.
Mindanao	Solar	Digos Solar Power Project Phase I	Enfinity Philippines Renewable Resources, Inc.
Mindanao	Solar	Digos Solar Power Project Phase II	Enfinity Philippines Renewable Resources, Inc.
Mindanao	Biomass	3 MW Biomass Cogeneration Facility	Philippine Trade Center, Inc.
Mindanao	Biomass	15 MW LPC Biomass Power Plant Project	Lamsan Power Corporation
Mindanao	Biomass	3.5 MW Biomass Cogeneration System	Green Earth Enersource Corporation
Mindanao	Biomass	10MW Malay-balay Bioenergy Corporation Multi Feedstock Generating Facility	Malaybalay Bio-energy Corporation
Mindanao	Biomass	23.5 MW EPC Woody Biomass Power Plant Project	Eastern Petroleum Corporation
Mindanao	Biomass	12 MW Napier Grass-Fired Biomass Power Plant Project	Manolo Fortich Biomass energy Corporation

* off grid project

== Social and environmental issues ==
Renewable energy companies in the Philippines continue to invest in fossil fuel expansion. Environmentalists say these companies are deliberately delaying the development of renewable energy to increase profits. Youth climate activist Jonelle Mitzi Tan said that the energy sector should phase out coal, stop the expansion of liquefied natural gas (LNG), and commit to "retiring fossil fuels on urgent timelines, respecting human rights and Indigenous sovereignty, and protecting workers through job guarantees".

Mining in the Philippines has expanded to supply nickel, copper, and other transition materials during the Philippines' and the global energy shift. According to Global Witness, this has led to the displacement of indigenous peoples' communities, killings and forced disappearances, militarization in mining areas, damage to forests and rivers, and worsening climate risks such as floods and landslides.

== See also ==
- Electricity sector in the Philippines
- Energy in the Philippines
- Geothermal power in the Philippines
- Wind power in the Philippines
