= Geothermal power in the Philippines =

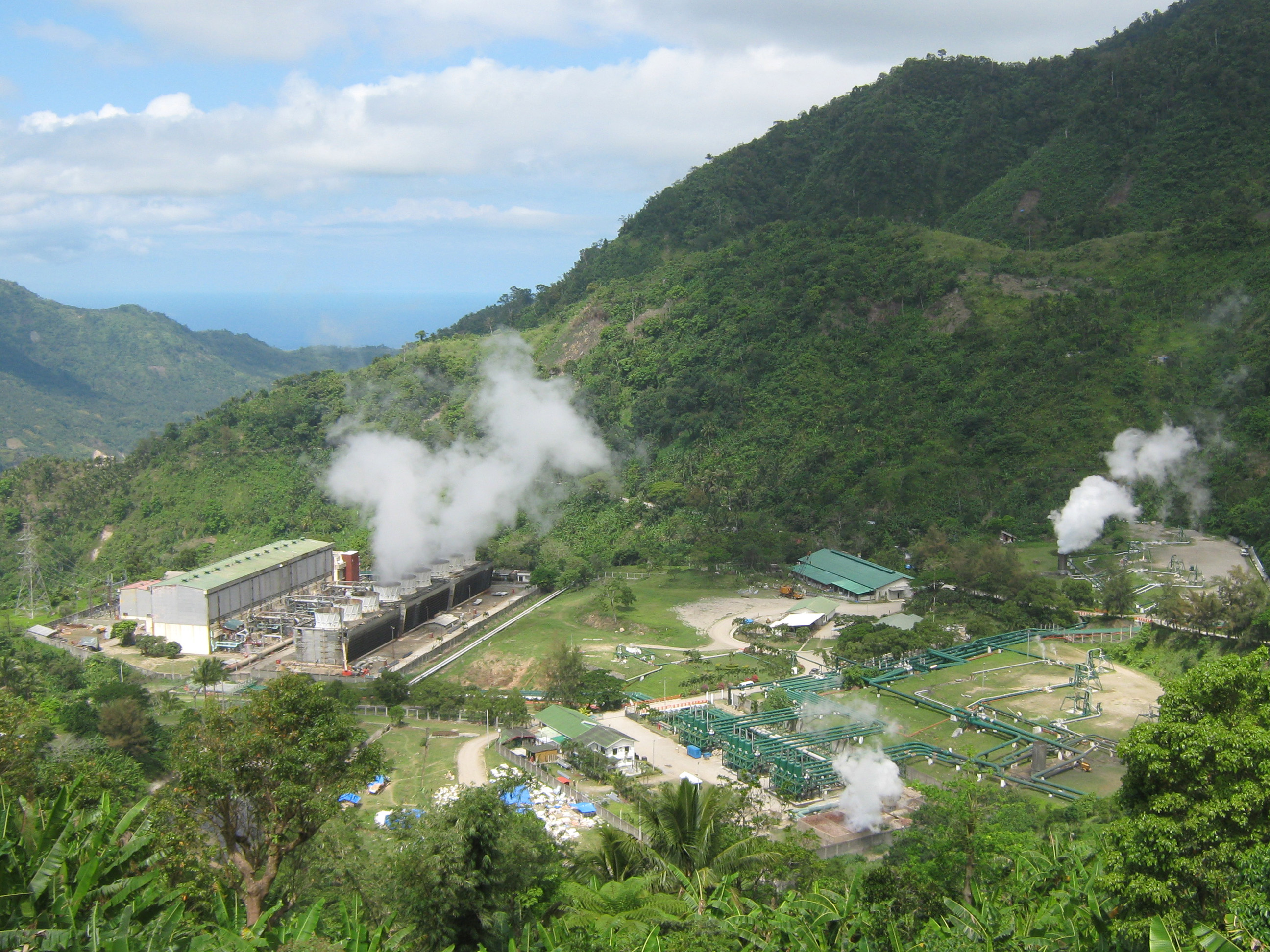
Geothermal power plant in Valencia, Negros Oriental

Geothermal power in the Philippines is the country's second largest source of renewable energy, and the fifth largest source of energy overall. Among sources of renewable energy, it is second only to hydroelectric power, although both sources are surpassed by the amount of energy drawn from coal, oil, and natural gas in that order.

The Philippines is one of the world's top producers of geothermal power, owing to its location along the Ring of Fire zone of Pacific volcanoes. The Geothermal Education Office and a 1980 article titled "The Philippines geothermal success story" by Rudolph J. Birsic published in the journal Geothermal Energy noted the remarkable geothermal resources of the Philippines. During the World Geothermal Congress held in 2000 in Beppu, Ōita Prefecture of Japan, it was reported that the Philippines is the largest consumer of electricity from geothermal sources and highlighted the potential role of geothermal energy in developing countries.

According to a 2015 study by Bertani, the Philippines ranks second to the United States worldwide in producing geothermal energy. The study notes that in 2015, the US had a capacity of 3450 megawatts from geothermal power, while the Philippines had a capacity of 1870 megawatts. The Philippines was then followed by Indonesia, which had 1340 MWe.

Early statistics from the Institute for Green Resources and Environment stated that Philippine geothermal energy provides 16% of the country's electricity. By 2005, geothermal energy accounted for 17.5% of the country's electricity production. More recent statistics from the IGA show that combined energy from the nation's six geothermal fields, located in the islands of Luzon, Leyte, Negros and Mindanao, still accounts for approximately 17% of the country's electricity generation.

In September 2025, the National Geothermal Association of the Philippines (NGAP) announced its 6th International Geothermal Conference aimed at promoting sustainable geothermal energy development.

== Geothermal power plants in the Philippines ==
Leyte island is where the first geothermal power plant, a 3 megawatt wellhead unit, started operations in July 1977. Larger-scale commercial production of geothermal power began in 1979 with the commissioning of a 110-megawatt plant at Tiwi field in Albay province. IGA figures as of December 2009 show the nation's installed geothermal capacity stands at 1904 megawatts, with gross generation of 10,311 gigawatt-hrs for all of 2009, representing 17% of the nation's total power generation mix.

As of 2017, the International Renewable Energy Agency estimated the Philippines' net installed geothermal energy capacity at 1.9 gigawatts (GW)—out of the global geothermal installed capacity of 12.7 GW—ranking behind the United States (2.5 GW) and ahead of Indonesia (1.5 GW). By the end of 2024 the Philippines' installed geothermal capacity had reached about 1,984 MW (roughly 2.0 GW), but it had slipped to third place worldwide as Indonesia (about 2,653 MW) overtook it for second; the United States (about 3,937 MW) remained the largest producer. Global installed geothermal power capacity stood at around 15 GW at the end of 2024. It also estimates that the country can potentially generate 2.1 GW from geothermal sources by 2025.

The country commissioned the 12-megawatt Maibarara Geothermal Power Plant-2 on March 9, 2018, in Santo Tomas, Batangas.

== Ownership of geothermal projects ==
Prior to 2020, foreign investments in geothermal projects were limited by a constitutional provision which limited foreign ownership of public utilities in the Philippines to 40 percent. On October 20, 2020, however, a modification of the implementing rules and regulations of the Renewable Energy Act of 2008 allowed an exception in the case of financial or technical agreements covering the large-scale exploration, development, and utilization of such resources, effectively allowing 100% ownership of any geothermal projects whose initial investment costs are over $50 million.

== See also ==
- Renewable energy in the Philippines
- Wind power in the Philippines
- List of Geothermal power plants in the Philippines
