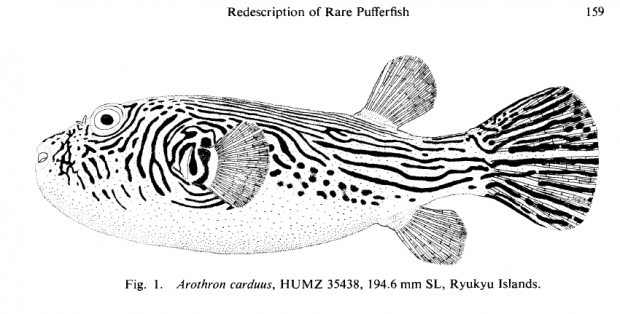
- Photograph (top) and illustration (bottom) of the second specimen collected in 1973

Conservation status
- Data Deficient (IUCN 3.1)

Scientific classification
- Kingdom: Animalia
- Phylum: Chordata
- Class: Actinopterygii
- Division: Teleostei
- Order: Tetraodontiformes
- Family: Tetraodontidae
- Genus: Arothron
- Species: A. carduus

Binomial name
- Arothron carduus (Cantor, 1849)

Synonyms
- Tetrodon carduus Cantor, 1849

= Arothron carduus =

Species of fish

Arothron carduus is a ray-finned fish in the family Tetraodontidae. It is an uncommon species with only three known specimens, and is native to the tropical and sub-tropical Indo-Pacific region.

== Taxonomy ==
Only three specimens of Arothron carduus are known.

The first specimen was the holotype of Arothron carduus's original 1849 description, and was collected at Penang Island. This specimen consisted only of the skin from the right side of the body, making subsequent evaluation of its taxonomic status difficult. No more specimens were reported until 1973, when one was caught in the Ryukyu Islands. In 1990, a third specimen was found in a souvenir shop in the Izu Islands, having been made into a lantern. The shop keeper said it may have been imported from the Philippines.

In 1991, the species was redescribed on the basis of these three specimens.

== Distribution and habitat ==
Arothron carduus is an uncommon fish and is known from two separate locations. In the eastern Indian Ocean it occurs in the seas around Penang Island, Malaysia, and in the Western Pacific Ocean, it occurs in the seas around the Ryukyu Islands, Japan. A dried specimen found in Japan may have originated from the Philippines. This fish typically inhabits coral reefs and is found in waters shallower than 10 m (30 ft).

== Description ==
This species is characterised by having narrow black convoluted lines on a white background. It is similar in appearance to another very rare species, Arothron multilineatus from Pagbilao in the Philippines, which has narrow white convoluted lines on a black background.

The third and last known specimen of the species was the largest, having a total length of 43.5 cm.

== Status ==
No particular threats to this fish have been recognised, but not enough is known about it to determine its population trends and conservation needs, so the International Union for Conservation of Nature has assessed its status as "data deficient". As a denizen of coral reefs, the degradation of the reefs may well have an adverse future effect on the species. However, parts of its known range are within the boundaries of some marine protected areas.
