= Siguil River hydropower plant =

Hydropower plant in Philippines

- Interactive map of Siguil River hydropower plant
- Location: Maasim, Sarangani, Philippines
- Coordinates: 5.9622°N 125.0527°E
- Construction began: 2019

Dam and spillways
- Impounds: Siguil River

Power Station
- Installed capacity: 14.5 MW

Siguil River Hydropower Plant is a 14.5-megawatt (MW) run-of-river hydroelectric facility located at the Siguil River basin in Maasim, Sarangani, Philippines. The facility uses the flow of the Siguil River, utilizing a 786-meter (2,579 ft) tunnel as part of a 21.6-kilometer (13.4 mi) waterways to convey water to the plant's turbines.

== Development and construction ==
Construction of the Siguil Hydropower Plant commenced in 2019 and was initially projected to begin commercial operations in early 2022. However, subsequent reports indicated that the start date was adjusted to the second quarter of 2023.

The project entailed an investment of approximately ₱4.5 billion.

== See also ==
- List of power plants in the Philippines
