= Wind power in the Philippines =

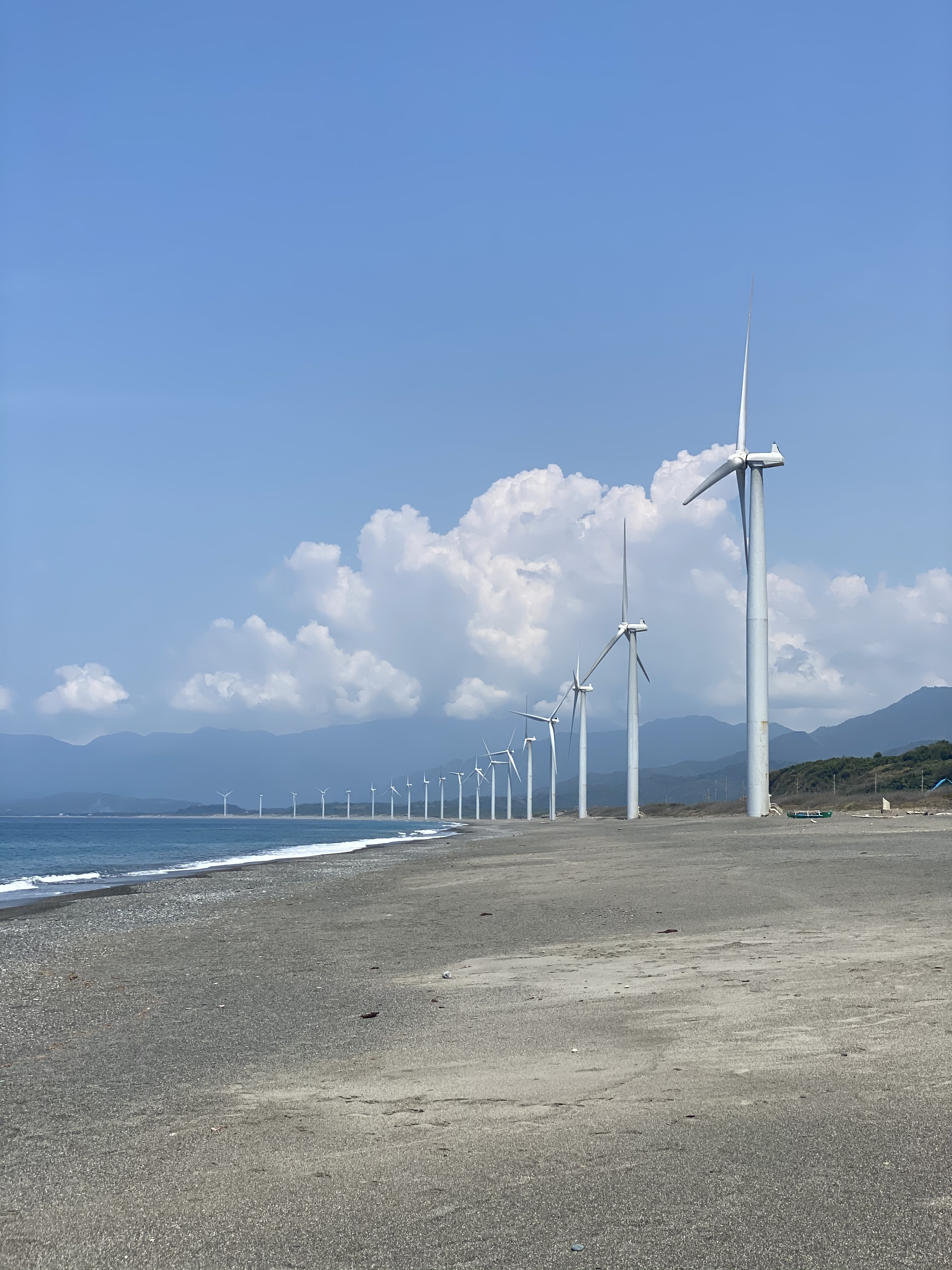
Burgos Wind Farm. It is currently the largest wind farm in the Philippines, providing 150MW of power to residents of Burgos, Ilocos Norte.

Wind power in the Philippines accounts for a total of 443MW as of 2020 according to the Department of Energy, covering about 1.6% of the country's total installed capacity for both renewable and non-renewable energy sources. When it comes to existing renewable energy sources in the country (i.e., geothermal, hydropower, biomass, solar, and wind), wind power has a total share of approximately 5.4%. Despite currently being a small contributor to the country's energy mix, wind power installations have increased from 33MW in 2012-2013 to 337MW in 2014, 427MW in 2015-2018, and 443MW in 2019-2021. Moreover, the Department of Energy's National Renewable Energy Plan (NREP) 2020-2040 aims to commission 2,345MW of total wind power capacity by 2030. There has been a setback, however, as the wind power industry was moderately affected by COVID, particularly in the import of wind turbines. Due to this, several projects such as the Aklan onshore wind project got delayed. To further drive the wind energy sector in the country, an increased demand for renewable energy, greater government commitments, and reduced wind power tariff are needed.

== State of wind farms ==
As of 2021, all wind farms in the Philippines consist of onshore (land-based) wind farms. On April 20, 2022, the Department of Energy and World Bank Group released the Philippines Offshore Wind Roadmap, which shows that the country has 178GW of technical offshore wind potential. Unlike onshore wind farms, offshore (water-based) wind farms are at the initial stages of development and has a global installation share of only 0.3% in the wind power industry, totaling 121.4MW. Despite this, offshore wind farms have a vast potential since they are built at waters and therefore have a wider coverage area. Since wind also blows stronger at oceans and seas, offshore wind farms have a higher power generation capacity.

Among the leading players in the Philippines' wind energy market include Alternergy Ltd, AC Energy Inc., General Electric Company, PetroEnergy Resources Corporation, and Vestas Wind Systems A/S. As renewable energy demand rises, wind turbines are at a unique position to help the country transition away from fossil-fuel based energy sources. By taking advantage of wind energy, the country can improve energy security, lower greenhouse gas emissions, increase renewable energy supply, and benefit the overall economy. Some policies and mechanisms that help make this possible include the Renewable Energy Law of 2008, Feed in Tariff (FIT), Net Metering Mechanism, Renewable Portfolio Standard (RPS), and Green Energy Option Program (GEOP). The Philippines also has several roadmaps and plans in place, such as the NREP, Philippine Energy Plan 2020-2040, and Philippine Renewable Energy Roadmap 2017-2040.

== Wind potentials in the country ==
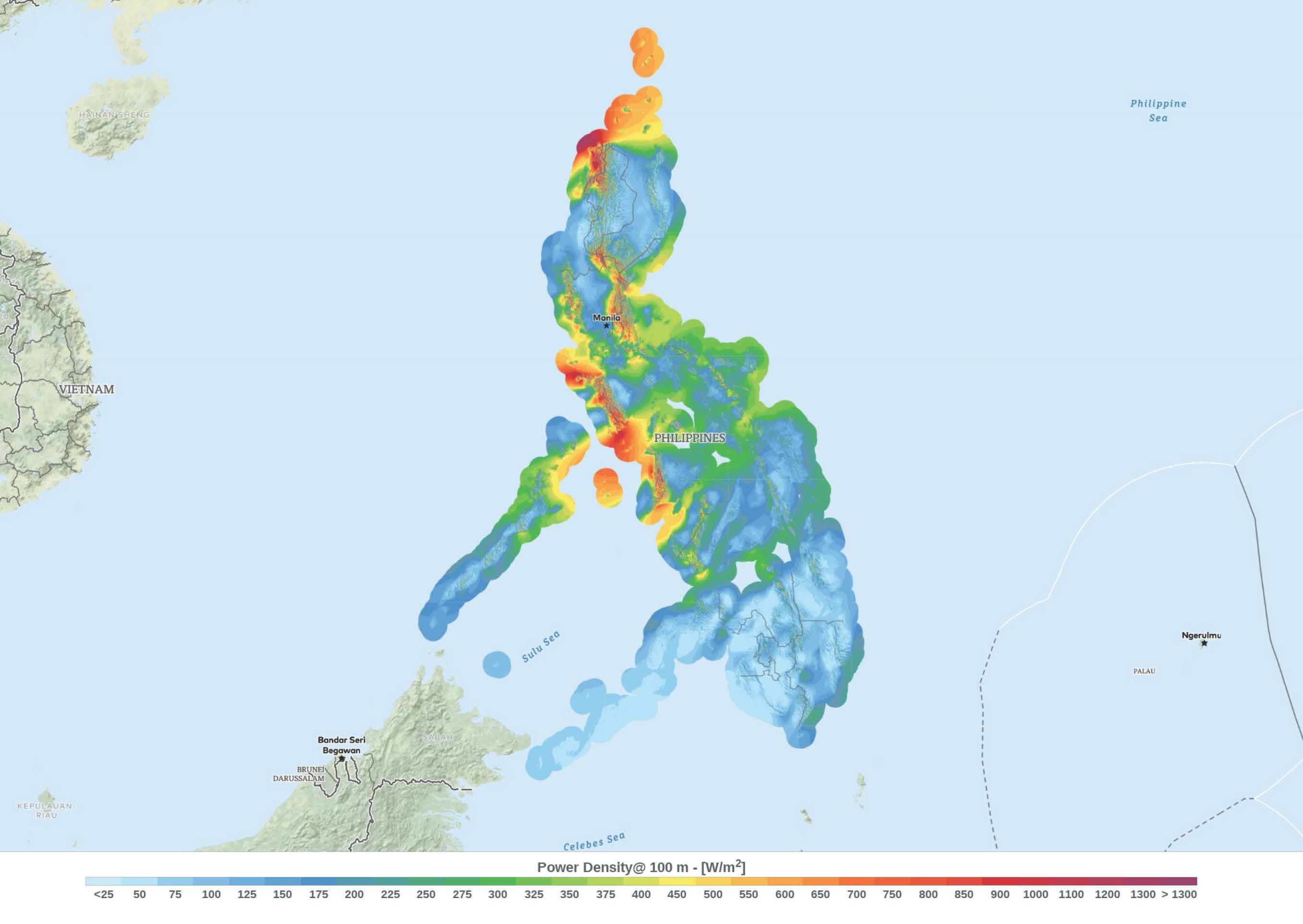
Philippines Wind Power Density Map. This wind resource map provides an estimated summary of mean wind power density at 100 m above surface level. Power density indicates wind power potential, part of which can be extracted by wind turbines. The map is derived from high-resolution wind speed distributions based on a chain of models, which downscales winds from global models (~70 km), to mesoscale (9 km) to microscale (150 m terrain). The resulting resolution is 250 m.

The greatest source of wind energy in the Philippines can be found in the northern and central areas, as well as the northern and central Luzon areas. Wind energy developers are highly interested in commercializing wind energy in the country due to this high potential. Overall, the country has 11,055km^{2} of 'windy' land that is estimated to have 'good to excellent' potential wind resource. Wind speeds at these areas range from 6.4 meters per second (m/s) to 10.1 m/s, with wind-power-density values of 300 to 1,250 watts per square meter (W/m^{2}).

When considering only the 'good to excellent' wind resource potential in the country, this accounts for 47 provinces with at least 500MW of wind potential for utility-scale or village power applications, and 25 provinces with at least 1,000MW. Based on conservative assumptions of 7MW per km^{2}, these provinces have a 7GW potential of installed wind power capacity. When factoring in the areas that do not have good to excellent wind conditions, the Philippines would have a wind resource potential of approximately 170GW.

Throughout the Philippines, the wind is strongest from November to February, and weakest from April to September. However, there are also regional differences. In northern Philippines, winds are strongest from October to February; In central and southern Philippines, the wind is strongest from November to March; finally, in southeastern Mindanao coast and western coast of Palawan, the wind is relatively strong from June to September.

According to a November 2000 report by the National Renewable Energy Laboratory, the best wind resources in the Philippines are found in six regions: (1) the Batanes and Babuyan islands north of Luzon; (2) the northwest tip of Luzon (Ilocos Norte); (3) the higher interior terrain of Luzon, Mindoro, Samar, Leyte, Panay, Negros, Cebu, Palawan, eastern Mindanao, and adjacent islands; (4) well-exposed east-facing coastal locations from northern Luzon southward to Samar; (5) the wind corridors between Luzon and Mindoro (including Lubang Island); and (6) between Mindoro and Panay (including the Semirara Islands and extending to the Cuyo Islands).

== Operating wind farms ==
As of 2021, there are seven wind farms operating in the Philippines. The Bangui Wind Farm is the oldest wind farm in the Philippines, commissioned in 2005. Meanwhile, the youngest wind farm is the Puerto Galera Wind Farm, commissioned in 2019. Currently, all wind farms in the country are onshore wind farms, which means they are either land-based or installed near shores. Offshore wind farms have yet to reach the waters of the Philippines, but according to the Department of Energy, around 30 wind energy service contracts (WESCs) were already awarded for offshore wind, totaling over 20GW of capacity. As more energy developers set their eyes on offshore wind power, the Philippines will begin to see wind farms operating even above waters.

=== Burgos Wind Farm ===
The Burgos Wind Farm in Ilocos Norte is currently the largest wind farm in the Philippines, powering locals with 150MW of energy. In October 2016, the Provincial Board of Ilocos Norte unanimously designated Ilocos Norte as a “clean, green, and coal-free province”. Currently, Ilocos Norte's Burgos Wind Farm is the largest of its kind in Southeast Asia, providing approximately 370GWh of energy and offsetting 200,000 tonnes of CO_{2} emissions annually. The Burgos Wind Farm consists of 50 V90 wind turbines each with a capacity of 3MW, making it a 150MW wind farm. Since being commissioned in 2014, the Burgos Wind Farm has won the Asia Power Engineering International Best Renewable Energy Project in 2015; it has also been nominated for the Philippine Government's feed-in-tariff incentive scheme which allowed the project to receive government subsidies.

=== Caparispisan Wind Farm ===
The second largest, Caparispisan Wind Farm (also known as the North Luzon Renewables Wind Farm) is a wind farm in Pagudpud, Ilocos Norte, Philippines. The wind farm was a joint venture of AC Energy Holdings, the Philippine Alliance for Infrastructure and the UPC Philippines Wind Holdco. The wind farm project amounted to $220 million. The wind farm's groundbreaking took place on September 3, 2013. It was fully commissioned by the Energy Regulatory Commission on November 11, 2014, and was later inaugurated on November 19 at the same year. The wind farm has 27 individual wind turbines occupying a 625-hectare land area.

=== Pililla Wind Farm ===
The Pililla Wind Farm, owned and operated by Alternergy Philippine Holdings Corporation (APHC), covers an area of 4,515 hectares under Department of Energy WESC NO. 2009-09-018. This Wind Energy Service Contract (WESC) has two phases, Pililla Wind Power Project under WESC NO. 2009-09-018-AF1 and the Mt. Sembrano Wind Power Project under WESC NO. 2009-09-018-AP2. The project consists of 27 wind turbine generators grouped into three clusters with an aggregate capacity of 54MW. The project interconnects to Meralco's Malaya-Teresa 115 kilovolts (kV) transmission line located 10km from the project site.

=== San Lorenzo Wind Farm ===
The San Lorenzo Wind Farm is based in San Lorenzo, Guimaras. It is owned and operated by Trans-Asia Renewable Energy Corporation (TAREC) and was commissioned in 2015. Since its commissioning, the wind farm has sparked tourism and economic development in the province. Tourism increased by approximately 50% owing to the attraction of locals to the wind farm. The wind farm consists of 27 wind turbines, each generating 2 MW of power. The turbines span 14 kilometers across four barangays in San Lorenzo. It is the first wind energy project that can consistently deliver 100% of capacity to the Visayas grid.

=== Puerto Galera Wind Farm ===
The Puerto Galera Wind Farm, also called the Wind Energy Power System (WEPS), is a 48MW wind farm project located near Puerto Galera in Mindoro Oriental. Philippines Hybrid Energy Systems Inc (PHESI) is the owner-developer and operator of the project. The first phase of the project is composed of 8 units of Gamesa G90 (2.0MW) turbines with a combined 16.0MW generating capacity, an access road, a substation, a 7.5km long 69kV transmission line, and a metering station which was completed mid-2019 and achieved commercial operations in Q3 2019. The project adds a substantial renewable energy source to an island grid heavily dominated by diesel-based electricity supply. A hybrid expansion of the project is underway, with a 6.0MW/6.0MWh Battery Energy Storage System under construction to complement the operating plant (COD expected in Q3/2020) and an additional 10.0MW of wind power to begin construction in 2021. Situated within the ancestral domain of the Mangyan tribe of indigenous people, the project co-exists with the indigenous people community and provides them a livelihood program in the form of maintaining a tree nursery and tree plantation.

=== Nabas Wind Farm ===
The Nabas Wind Farm is based in Nabas, Aklan. It is owned and operated by PetroWind Energy, Inc. The first phase, which consists of 36MW, was commissioned in 2015. The second phase consisting of 14MW is under development and expected to be commissioned by approximately 2023. In July 2022, reports show that PetroWind Energy, Inc. is finalizing the selection of a contractor to begin the second phase before making a final investment decision.

=== Bangui Wind Farm ===
The Bangui Wind Farm is a wind farm in Bangui, Ilocos Norte, Philippines. The wind farm uses 20 units of 70m (230 ft) high Vestas V82 1.65 MW wind turbines, arranged in a single row stretching along a 9-kilometer (5.6 mi) shoreline off Bangui Bay, facing the South China Sea. Phase I of the NorthWind power project in Bangui Bay consisted of 15 of those wind turbines, each with a maximum production capacity of 1.65 MW of electric power, making a total of 24.75 MW. These 15 onshore turbines are spaced 326m (1,070ft) apart, each 70m (230 ft) high, with 41 meters (135 ft) long blades, with a rotor diameter of 82 meters (269 ft) and a wind swept area of 5,281 square meters (56,840 sq ft). Phase II was completed in August 2008, and added five more of the same wind turbines, bringing the total maximum capacity to 33 MW. Ayala Corporation energy platform AC Energy, which already holds the controlling shares in Bangui Wind Farm as of 2021, has announced its intent to acquire 100% of the shares of NorthWind in order to boost their renewable energy portfolio, pending approvals from oversight entities like the Philippine Competition Commission.

Operating wind farms in the Philippines as of 2021, largest to smallest in MW
Project	Type	Island	Location	Commission year	Owner	Operator	Installed capacity
Burgos Wind Farm	Onshore	Luzon	Burgos, Ilocos Norte	2014	EDC Burgos Wind Power Corporation	Vestas Wind Systems A/S	150MW
Caparispisan Wind Farm	Onshore	Luzon	Pagudpud, Ilocos Norte	2014	Joint venture between AC Energy Holdings, Philippine Alliance for Infrastructure and UPC Philippines Wind Holdco	North Luzon Renewable Energy Corporation	81MW
Pililla Wind Farm	Onshore	Luzon	Pililla, Rizal	2016	Alternergy Philippine Holdings Corporation	Alternergy Philippine Holdings Corporation	54MW
San Lorenzo Wind Farm	Onshore	Visayas	San Lorenzo, Guimaras	2015	Trans-Asia Renewable Energy Corporation	Trans-Asia Renewable Energy Corporation	54MW
Bangui Wind Farm	Onshore	Luzon	Bangui, Ilocos Norte	2005	AC Energy, Inc.	NorthWind Power Development Corp.	Phase 1: 24.75 MW Phase 2: 8.25 MW Phase 3: 18.90 MW Total: 51.9 MW
Nabas Wind Farm	Onshore	Visayas	Nabas, Aklan	2015	PetroWind Energy, Inc.	PetroWind Energy, Inc.	36MW
Puerto Galera Wind Farm	Onshore	Luzon	Puerto Galera, Oriental Mindoro	2019	Philippines Hybrid Energy Systems Inc.	Philippines Hybrid Energy Systems Inc.	16 MW

== Wind farms under development ==
=== Balaoi and Caunayan Wind Farm ===
The Balaoi and Caunayan Wind Farm is an onshore wind farm in Pagudpud, Ilocos Norte that is currently under construction by AC Energy in partnership with UPC Renewables. AC Energy is a Philippines-based power generation company, while UPC Renewables is an independent renewable energy company headquartered in Hong Kong. The construction began in 2021 and upon completion, it will become the biggest wind farm in the Philippines by power output and the second wind farm of AC Energy in Pagudpud after the Caparispisan Wind Farm. It is projected to be completed by 2023 and reportedly cost USD 238.48 million (PHP 11.4 billion). The wind farm will have a total capacity of 160MW to be powered by 32 onshore wind turbines with a rated power generation capacity of 5MW. Siemens Gamesa supplies the wind turbines.

=== Aklan I Wind Project ===
The Aklan Wind Farm is a 75.6MW onshore wind farm in the north-western tip of Panay that is currently at the permitting phase. It is being developed by wpd, a Bremen-based project developer and operator of wind and solar farms, in cooperation with Triconti ECC Renewables Corporation, a German-Swiss-Filipino joint venture. The Aklan wind farm will comprise 18 Vestas V136 turbines with a capacity of 4.2 MW each. The hilly site is located at an altitude of between 123m and 362m above sea level. At the current planning stage, commissioning is scheduled for the end of 2023. The project is part of a large-scale grid reinforcement and expansion for the islands of Cebu, Negros and Panay, called “CNP Backbone Extension”. The wind farm will be connected to the grid via a new substation, which is being built by wpd and Triconti for the National Grid Corporation of the Philippines. The project partners are currently in talks to market the electricity generated by the wind farm locally via a Power Purchase Agreement (PPA).

=== Offshore wind farms under development ===
In January 2022, Iberdrola S.A. signed an agreement with Triconti ECC Renewables to construct five offshore wind projects with up to 3.5 GW capacity in the upcoming years. This project helps the Philippines promote its National Renewable Energy Program (NREP) for 2020-2040, which has set a target of 35% share of renewable energy in the power generation mix by 2030 and 50% share by 2040. During the same month, The Blue Circle and its partner CleanTech Global Renewables Inc. signed a contract to construct an offshore wind project in the Philippines with the capacity of 1.2 GW located in Bulalacao, Oriental Mindoro. The wind farm will feature 100 turbines with a unit capacity of 12 MW.
