= Asiga Hydro Power Plant =

Hydropower plant in Philippines

Coordinates: 9.2645°N 125.5829°E

Asiga Hydropower Plant is a 8MW hydro electricity generation facility located in the Caraga region on Mindanao Island, Philippines. Construction of the project began in 2012 as part of a broader effort to develop sustainable energy sources in the Philippines. The plant utilizes generators manufactured by Voith Fuji Hydro, a joint venture between Japanese and German engineering firms. The project aligns with the Japanese government’s promotion of low-carbon, high-efficiency infrastructure exports and supports both sustainable development in the Philippines and Japan’s goals for global greenhouse gas (GHG) reductions.

== See also ==
- List of power plants in the Philippines
