= Balaoi and Caunayan Wind Farm =

Wind farm in the Philippines

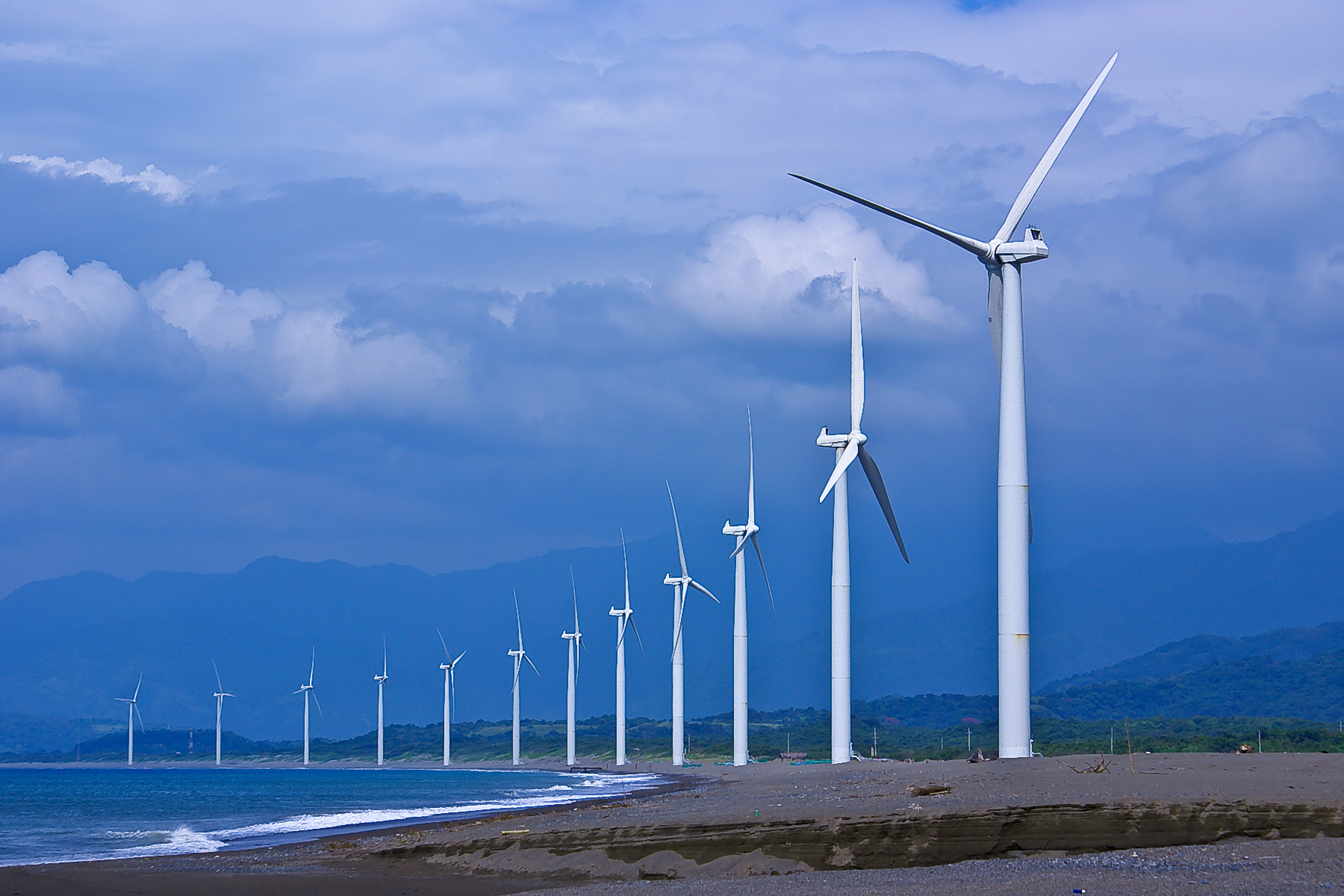
- Country: Philippines
- Location: Pagudpud, Ilocos Norte
- Status: Under construction
- Construction began: 2021
- Operator: UPC Renewables

Wind farm
- Type: Onshore

Power generation
- Units operational: 32 X 5 MW
- Nameplate capacity: 160 MW

The Balaoi and Caunayan Wind Farm, is a wind farm under construction in Pagudpud, Ilocos Norte, Philippines.

The construction of the wind power facility by AC Energy, in partnership with developer UPC Renewables, began in 2021. Upon its completion it will become the biggest wind farm in the Philippines by power output and the second wind farm of AC Energy in Pagudpud after the Caparispisan Wind Farm. It is projected to be completed by late 2022. The wind farm project reportedly cost ₱11.4-billion.

The Balaoi and Caunayan Wind Farm will have a total capacity of 160MW, to be powered by 32 5MW wind turbines to be supplied by Siemens Gamesa.
