= Mount Apo Geothermal Power Plant =

- Location within Philippines
- Country: Philippines
- Location: Kidapawan, Cotabato
- Coordinates: 7.013°N 125.22°E
- Status: Operational
- Commission date: March 1997
- Owners: FDC Utilities, Inc.
- Operator: Energy Development Corporation

Geothermal power station
- Type: Flash steam
- Wells: 19 production wells 9 reinjection wells

Power generation
- Units operational: 1 × 52 MW; 1 × 54 MW
- Nameplate capacity: 106 MW

The Mount Apo Geothermal Power Plant is a 106-MW geothermal power station located in Barangay Ilomavis, Kidapawan, Cotabato, Philippines.

Drawing steam from the Mindanao Geothermal Production Field, the power station is situated near the foot of Mount Apo. It is currently part of the Mindanao Grid that supplies electricity to Kidapawan and Davao Region.

It is built with the ancestral domain of the Manobo, who receive royalty from the operation of the power station.

== History ==
Plans for a geothermal plant was in place as early as 1988. The project was an initiative of the Energy Development Corporation (EDC) which was then a subsidiary of the state-owned Philippine National Oil Company (PNOC).

The project was subject to delay with opposition to it due to Mount Apo being a site of a national park and a designated ASEAN Heritage Park. Also the Manobo considers the area as linked to their faith.

On March 10, 1992, a ritual known as Pamaas was conducted in Lake Agco by a tribal elder who sought permission from Apo Sandawa, the mountain deity. The Manobo also as a result also is entitled to royalty due to usage of their ancestral land.

The first unit of the Mount Apo Geothermal Power Plant was commissioned on March 4, 1997. Due to a build–operate–transfer scheme it was operated under an American-Japanese consortium of Oxbow Power Corp. and Marubeni. The second unit was commissioned on June 17, 1999.

The consortium was to turn over the operation back to the EDC after ten years. But this was extended taking into account the second unit's commissioning. The EDC was privatized in 2007 and was taken over by the Lopez Group. The EDC acquired the geothermal station in 2009.

The Manobo renewed their consent to use the site by the EDC in exchange for royalties with the conduct of the samaya ritual in 2019.

== Facilities ==
Unit	Capacity	Commissioned
Mindanao 1 Geothermal Partnership (M1GP)	52-MW	1997
Mindanao 2 Geothermal Partnership (M2GP)	54-MW	1999
