= Bauang Diesel Power Plant =

- Country: Philippines
- Location: Bauang, La Union
- Coordinates: 16.49042°N 120.32712°E
- Commission date: 1995
- Owner: 1590 EC
- Operator: 1590 EC

Thermal power station
- Primary fuel: Diesel

Power generation
- Nameplate capacity: 215 MW

The Bauang Diesel Power Plant (BDPP) is a diesel-powered electricity generator in Bauang, La Union, Philippines. It is the largest bunker-fired power plant in terms of generating capacity. The plant has helped address the supply needs of the Luzon grid since the start of its commercial operations in 1995.

== History ==
The Bauang Diesel Power Plant (BDPP) is a result of a build-operate-transfer (BOT) agreement between the private consortium First Private Power Corp. (FPPC) and the state-owned National Power Corporation (NPC) in 1993. FPPC was formed by Meralco, First Philippine Holdings, JG Summit Holdings and PCI Capital in response to a power crisis in the 1990s. The FPPC incorporated the Bauang Private Power Corporation (BPPC) to maintain and operate the power plant after its completion. The BDDP was commissioned on July 25, 1995.

Upon the expiry of the BOT deal in July 2010, the BPPC turned over the facility back to the national government, specifically to the Power Sector Assets and Liabilities Management Corporation (PSALM) and the NPC. PSALM-NPC, turned over the facility to the provincial government of La Union.

In 2019, the property associated with the power plant was acquired by the local government of La Union.

On April 6, 2022, the Provincial Government of La Union (PGLU) issued the notice of award to 1590 EC for the ownership of the power facility, which 1590 EC has been operating and maintaining since 2010 under a lease contract with the provincial government. 1590 EC is a majority-owned subsidiary of Vivant Energy Corp. (Vivant Energy), which is in turn a wholly owned subsidiary of Vivant Corp.
