= Pagbilao Power Station =

Coal-fired power station in the Philippines

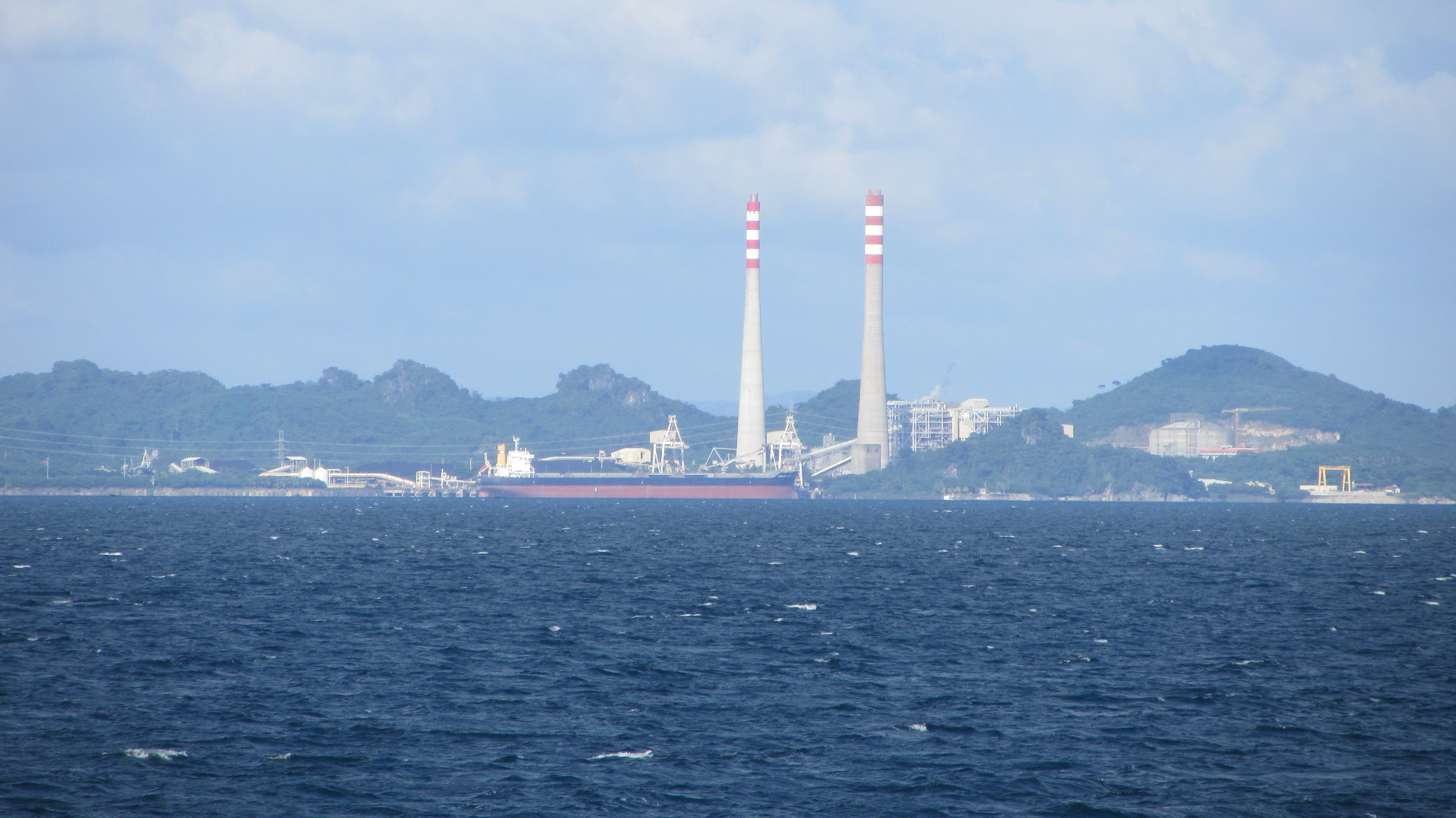
- Country: Philippines
- Location: Pagbilao, Quezon
- Coordinates: 13°53′38″N 121°44′43″E
- Status: Operational
- Commission date: 1993
- Owners: TeaM Energy (Units 1 and 2); Pagbilao Energy (Unit 3)
- Operators: AboitizPower; JERA; Marubeni

Thermal power station
- Primary fuel: Coal

Power generation
- Units operational: 3
- Nameplate capacity: 1,155 MW

External links
- Commons: Related media on Commons

The Pagbilao Power Station is a 1,155-MW coal-fired power station in Pagbilao, Quezon, Philippines.

Situated at Isla Grande, the Pagbilao Power Station began operations in 1993.

The power station was originally developed by Consolidated Electric Power Asia Ltd (CEPA), a subsidiary of Hopewell Holdings, CEPA was acquired by Mirant Philippines and was acquired by TeaM Energy, a joint venture of Japanese firms TEPCO and Marubeni, in 2007.

In May 1994, President Fidel V. Ramos instructed public works officials to design a navigational water channel through Quezon province modeled after the Suez Canal, intended to connect the Pacific Ocean directly to the South China Sea. Concurrently, during a site visit to a plant, Ramos reviewed additional infrastructure ventures proposed by the Hong Kong firm, which comprised a six-lane expressway to Manila, a continuation of the South Superhighway, and an inter-plant highway route extending to Sual, Pangasinan.

In December 2014, a 420-MW third unit started operations, expanding the capacity of the facility, which had a capacity of 735 MW. The third unit was a project of Pagbilao Energy Corporation, a joint venture of Aboitiz Power Corporation and TeaM Energy.
