= Pagbilao =

Municipality in Quezon, Philippines

- Municipality
- Municipality of Pagbilao
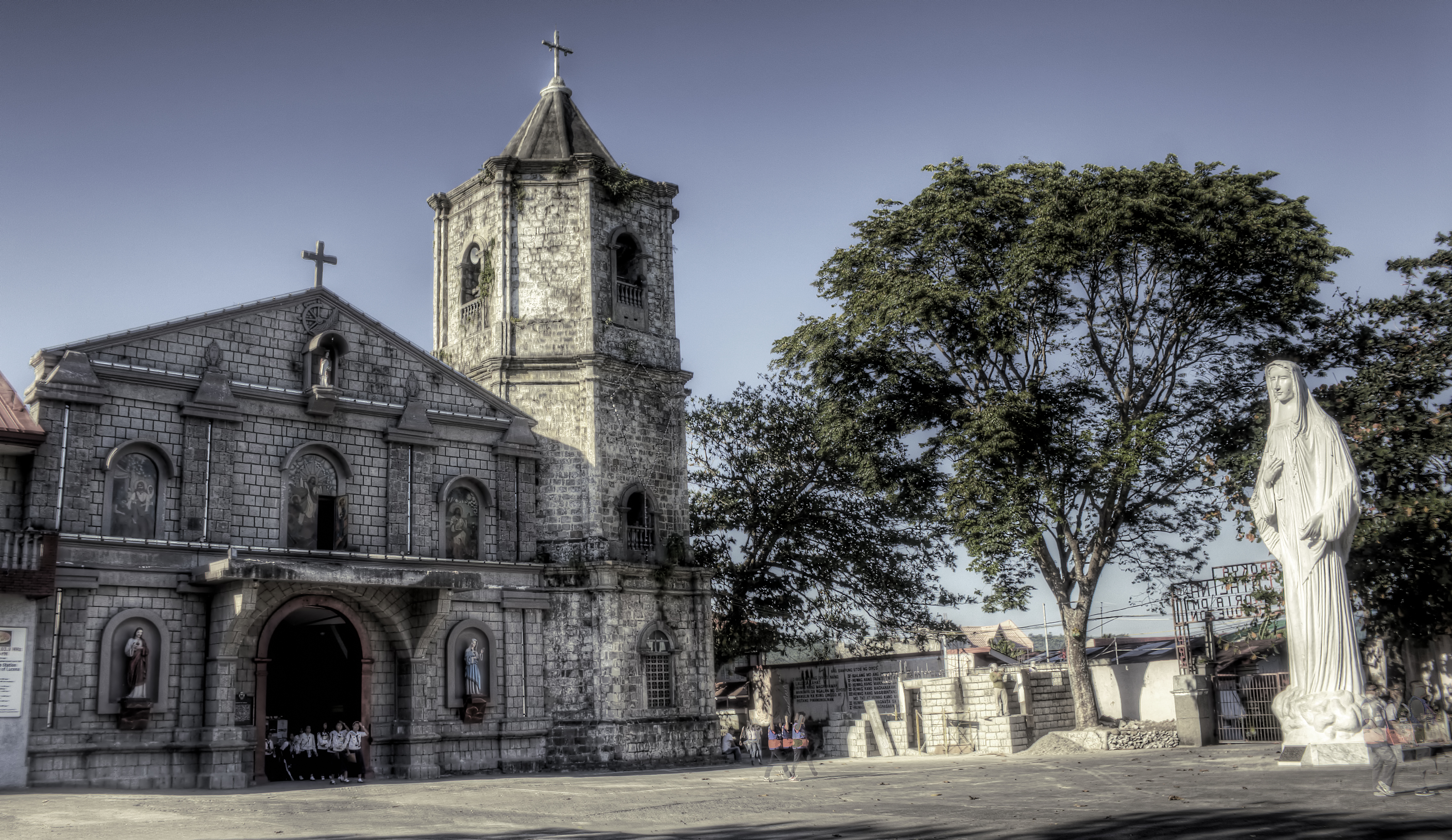
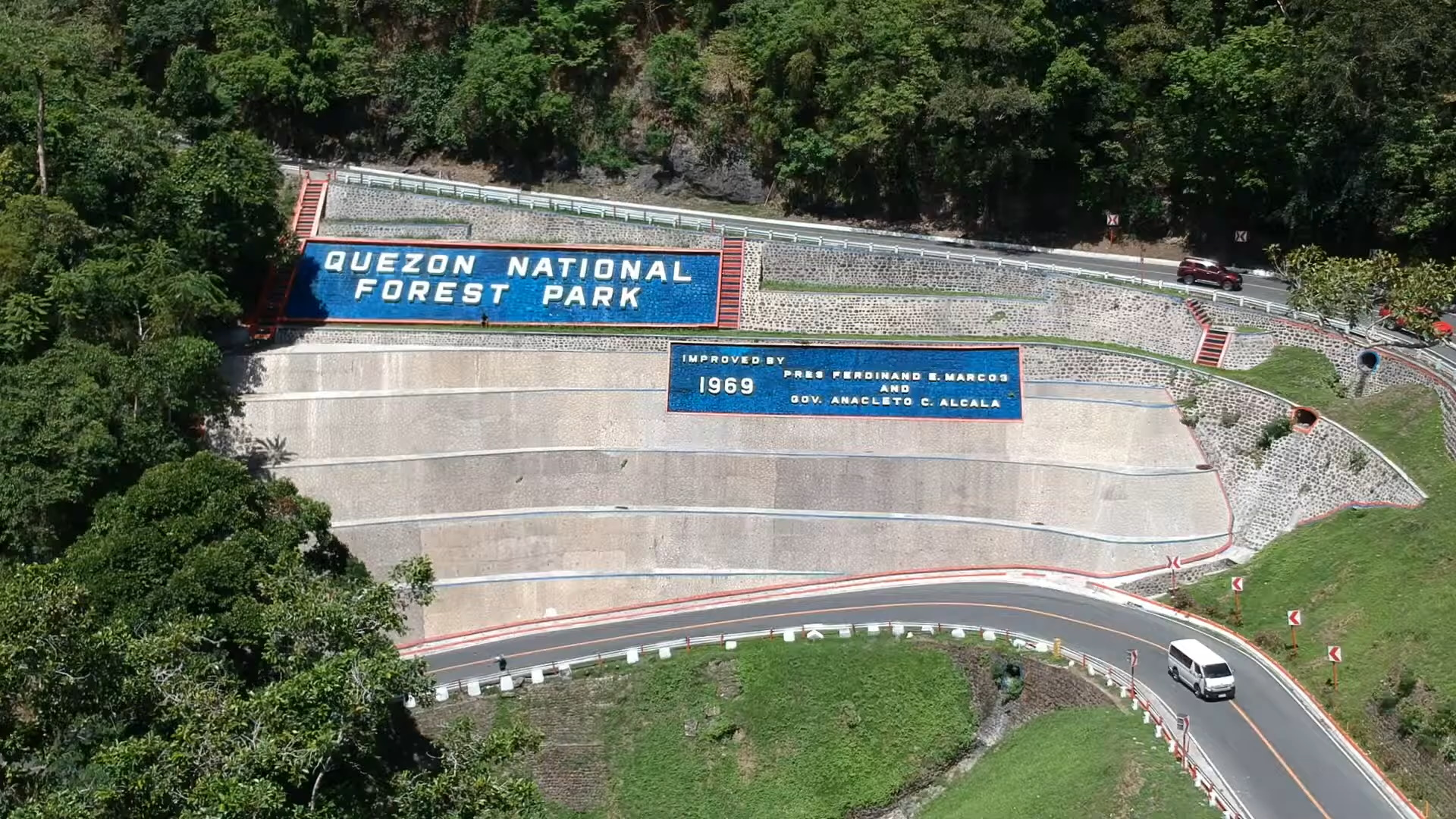
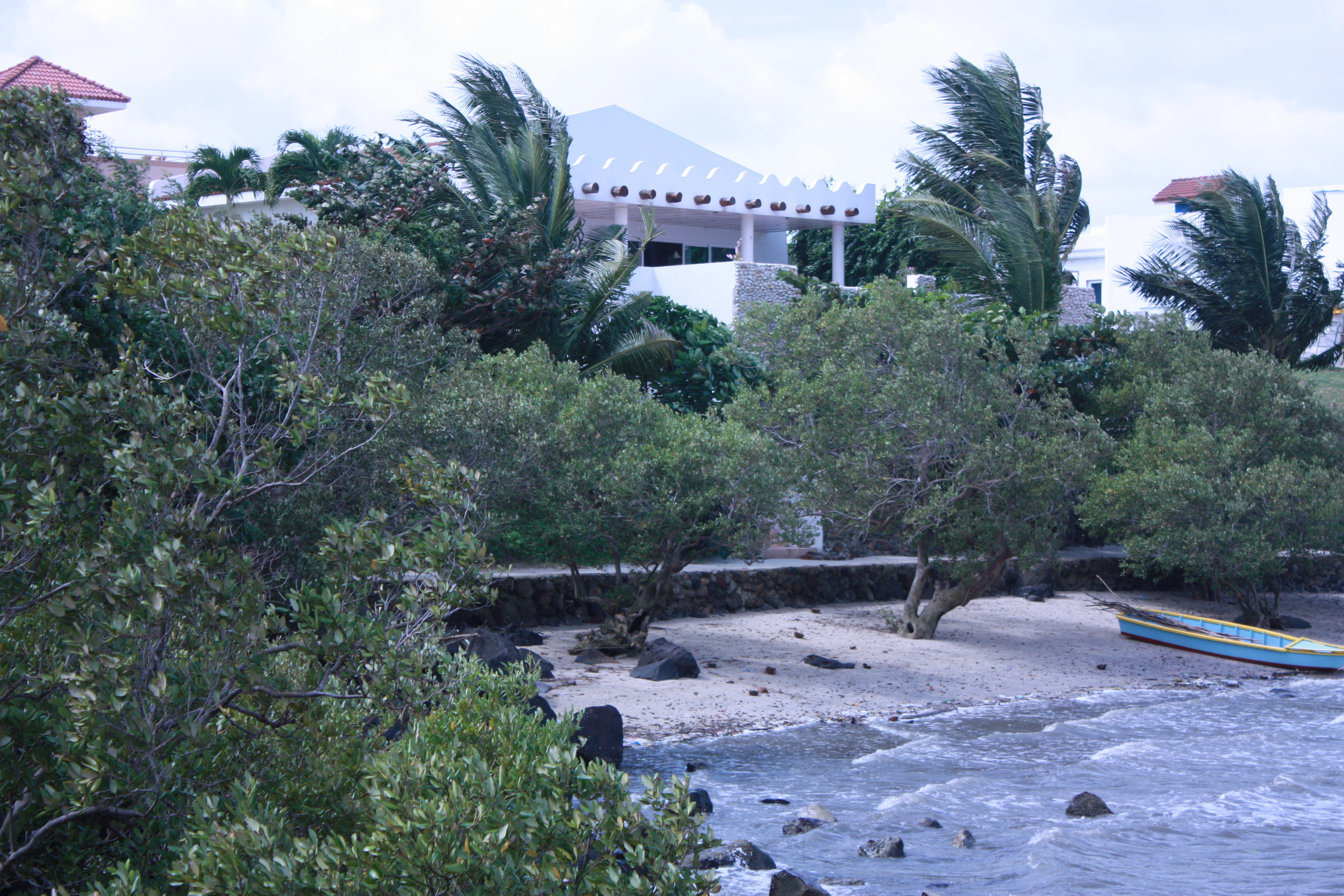
- From top, left to right : St. Catherine of Alexandria Parish Church • Zigzag Road, Quezon National Forest Park • Pueblo La Playa Resort

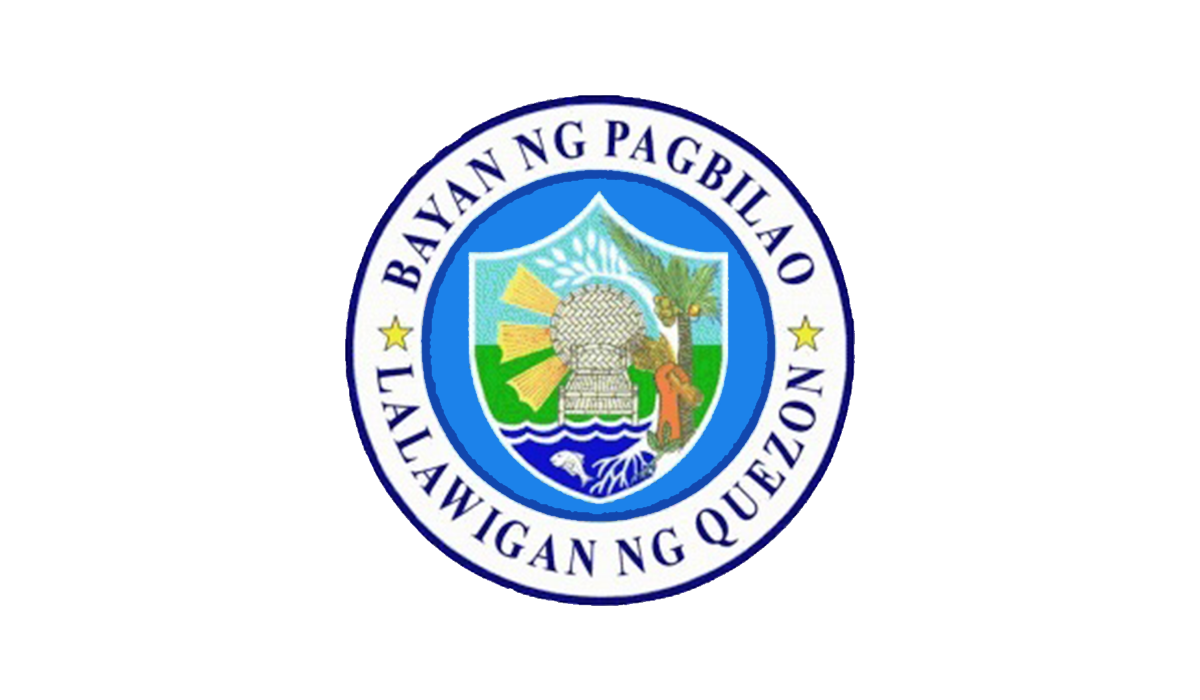
- Flag

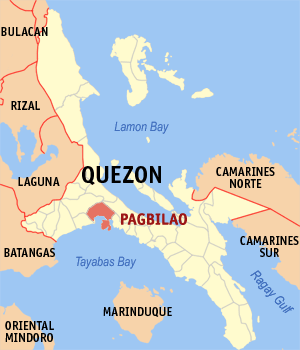
- Map of Quezon with Pagbilao highlighted
- Interactive map of Pagbilao
- Location within the Philippines
- Coordinates: 13°58′19″N 121°41′13″E
- Country: Philippines
- Region: Calabarzon
- Province: Quezon
- District: 1st district
- Founded: August 29, 1730
- Barangays: 27 (see Barangays)

Government
  - Type: Sangguniang Bayan
  - Mayor: Angelica G. Portes
  - Vice Mayor: Walter G. Dapla
  - Representative: Wilfrido Mark M. Enverga
  - Municipal Council: Members: Joseph Manuel G. Luce; Dr. Joseph C. Garcia; Dr. Emmanuel C. Roces; Mary Catherine M. Garcia; Angelo Laurence P. Arriola; Ariel T. Martinez; Celedonio C. Dapla; Jeffrey A. Tiñana
  - Electorate: 50,829 voters (2025)

Area
  - Total: 170.96 km^{2} (66.01 sq mi)
- Elevation: 24.2 m (79 ft)
- Highest elevation: 259 m (850 ft)
- Lowest elevation: −1 m (−3.3 ft)

Population (2024 census)
  - Total: 82,132
  - Density: 480.42/km^{2} (1,244.3/sq mi)
  - Households: 19,501
- Demonym: Pagbilaoin

Economy
  - Income class: 1st municipal income class
  - Poverty incidence: 3.63% (2023)
  - Revenue: ₱ 664.2 million (2024)
  - Assets: ₱ 2,199 million (2024)
  - Expenditure: ₱ 289.8 million (2024)
  - Liabilities: ₱ 502.2 million (2024)

Service provider
  - Electricity: Manila Electric Company (Meralco)
- Time zone: UTC+8 (PST)
- ZIP code: 4302
- PSGC: 0405630000
- IDD : area code: +63 (0)42
- Native languages: Tagalog
- Website: www.pagbilao.gov.ph

Pagbilao, officially the Municipality of Pagbilao (Tagalog: Bayan ng Pagbilao), is a municipality in the province of Quezon, Philippines. According to the 2024 census, it has a population of 82,132 people.

The name of Pagbilao is said to have been derived from the Tagalog words papag (bamboo beds) and bilao (winnowing basket).

== Geography ==
Pagbilao is located on the northern shore of Tayabas Bay on Luzon, just east of Lucena, the provincial capital. It is 9 kilometres (5.6 mi) from Lucena and 139 kilometres (86 mi) from Manila.

=== Barangays ===
Pagbilao is politically subdivided into 27 barangays, as indicated below. Each barangay consists of puroks and some have sitios.

- Alupaye
- Añato
- Antipolo
- Bantigue
- Barangay 1 Castillo (Poblacion)
- Barangay 2 Daungan (Poblacion)
- Barangay 3 Del Carmen (Poblacion)
- Barangay 4 Parang (Poblacion)
- Barangay 5 Santa Catalina (Poblacion)
- Barangay 6 Tambak (Poblacion)
- Bigo
- Binahaan
- Bukal
- Ibabang Bagumbungan
- Ibabang Palsabangon (detour)
- Ibabang Polo
- Ikirin
- Ilayang Bagumbungan
- Ilayang Palsabangon
- Ilayang Polo
- Kanlurang Malicboy
- Mapagong
- Mayhay
- Pinagbayanan
- Silangang Malicboy
- Talipan
- Tukalan

=== Climate ===
Climate data for Pagbilao, Quezon
| Month | Jan | Feb | Mar | Apr | May | Jun | Jul | Aug | Sep | Oct | Nov | Dec | Year |
|---|---|---|---|---|---|---|---|---|---|---|---|---|---|
| Mean daily maximum °C (°F) | 26 (79) | 27 (81) | 29 (84) | 31 (88) | 31 (88) | 30 (86) | 29 (84) | 29 (84) | 29 (84) | 29 (84) | 28 (82) | 26 (79) | 29 (84) |
| Mean daily minimum °C (°F) | 22 (72) | 22 (72) | 22 (72) | 23 (73) | 24 (75) | 24 (75) | 24 (75) | 24 (75) | 24 (75) | 24 (75) | 23 (73) | 23 (73) | 23 (74) |
| Average precipitation mm (inches) | 83 (3.3) | 55 (2.2) | 44 (1.7) | 37 (1.5) | 90 (3.5) | 123 (4.8) | 145 (5.7) | 125 (4.9) | 135 (5.3) | 166 (6.5) | 163 (6.4) | 152 (6.0) | 1,318 (51.8) |
| Average rainy days | 15.1 | 10.8 | 11.9 | 11.4 | 19.9 | 23.7 | 26.3 | 23.9 | 23.9 | 22.1 | 20.2 | 18.6 | 227.8 |
Source: Meteoblue

== Demographics ==
Population census of Pagbilao
| Year | Pop. | ±% p.a. |
|---|---|---|
| 1903 | 6,085 | — |
| 1918 | 6,879 | +0.82% |
| 1939 | 11,379 | +2.43% |
| 1948 | 12,978 | +1.47% |
| 1960 | 17,303 | +2.43% |
| 1970 | 26,587 | +4.38% |
| 1975 | 29,304 | +1.97% |
| 1980 | 31,681 | +1.57% |
| 1990 | 41,635 | +2.77% |
| 1995 | 49,605 | +3.34% |
| 2000 | 53,442 | +1.61% |
| 2007 | 62,561 | +2.20% |
| 2010 | 65,996 | +1.96% |
| 2015 | 75,023 | +2.47% |
| 2020 | 78,700 | +1.01% |
| 2024 | 82,132 | +1.03% |
Source: Philippine Statistics Authority

== Economy ==
Poverty incidence of Pagbilao (%)

Source: Philippine Statistics Authority

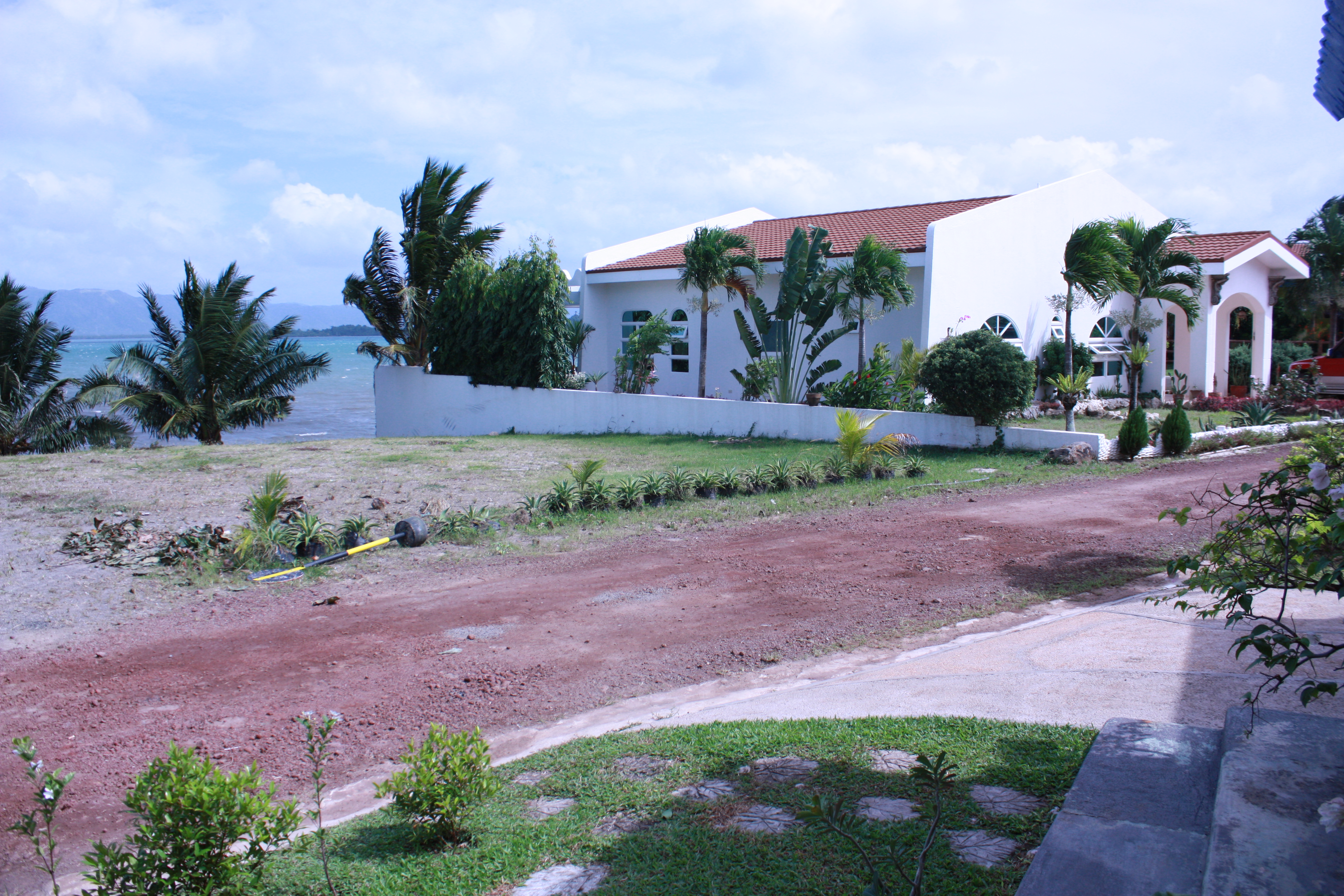
Pueblo La Playa Resort

Most of the land in Pagbilao is used for agriculture; mainly coconut, rice and poultry farms. Some lands are used for industrial purposes which include mostly of industrial plants and ice plants.

The Province of Quezon announced that they are planning to make an industrial park or economic zone in the Barangays of Alupaye and Bantigue of Pagbilao. It will really help the employment of the people of Quezon Province.

Commerce has rapidly grown especially in the downtown area but is starting to spread in other parts of the town. There are also a growing number of commercial establishments. La Suerte Mega Warehouse, for instance, is considered the largest center of commerce in Pagbilao.

In terms of tourism, there is an observed growth in Pagbilao. Many hotels can be found especially in highways or beachfronts in Barangay Bantigue.

The DEPED-Division of Quezon Province has its main office in town. Both the DepEd division and municipal government are top employers in the municipality.

The Pagbilao Power Station, which is also one of the largest job providers in the town, is located in Isla Grande in Pagbilao.

== Government ==
=== Elected officials ===
Municipal council (2022–2025):

- Mayor: Angelica Portes Tatlonghari
- Vice Mayor: Shierre Ann Portes Palicpic
- Councilors:
  - Manuel D. Luna
  - Michael E. Martinez
  - Jeffrey A. Tiñana
  - Mary Catherine M. Garcia
  - Aldrien R. Calabia
  - Joahnnes R. Mercado
  - Celedonio C. Dapla
  - Bernardita D. Ayaton
  - Maria Assumpta Z. Ariate (ABC)
  - Stephanie Ann A. Porte (SKMF)

Municipal council (2019–2022):

- Mayor: Shierre Ann Portes-Palicpic
- Vice Mayor: Joseph C. Garcia
- Councilors:
  - Michael E. Martinez
  - Manuel D. Luna
  - Joahnnes R. Mercado
  - Aldrien R. Calabia
  - Lolito M. Merle
  - Apolinar R. Martinez
  - Bernardita D. Ayaton
  - Jacinto A. Piñon
  - Wilfredo C. Zafra (ABC)
  - Joseph Manuel G. Luce (SKMF)

== Infrastructure ==
=== Transportation ===
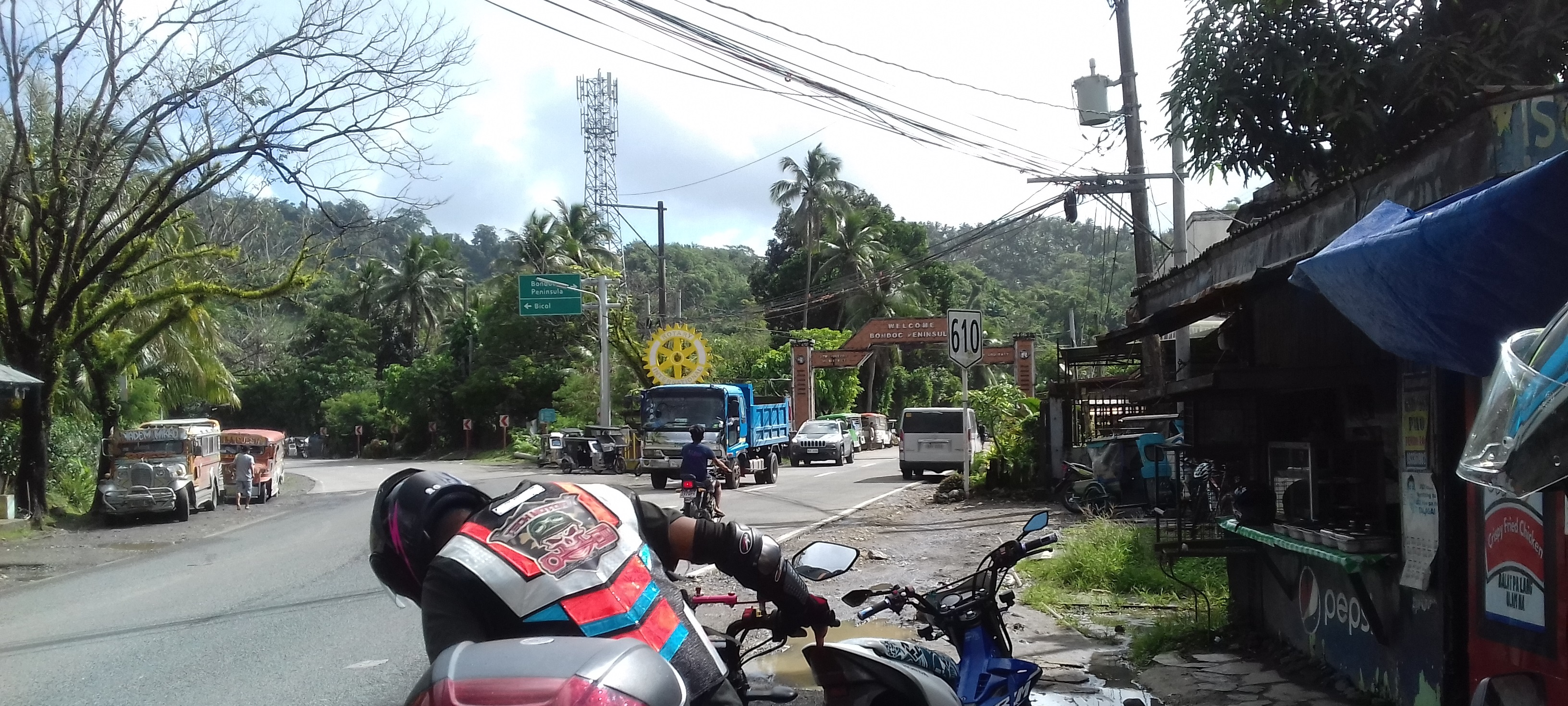
The intersection of Pan-Philippine Highway and Pagbilao–Padre Burgos Road in Barangay Silangang Malicboy

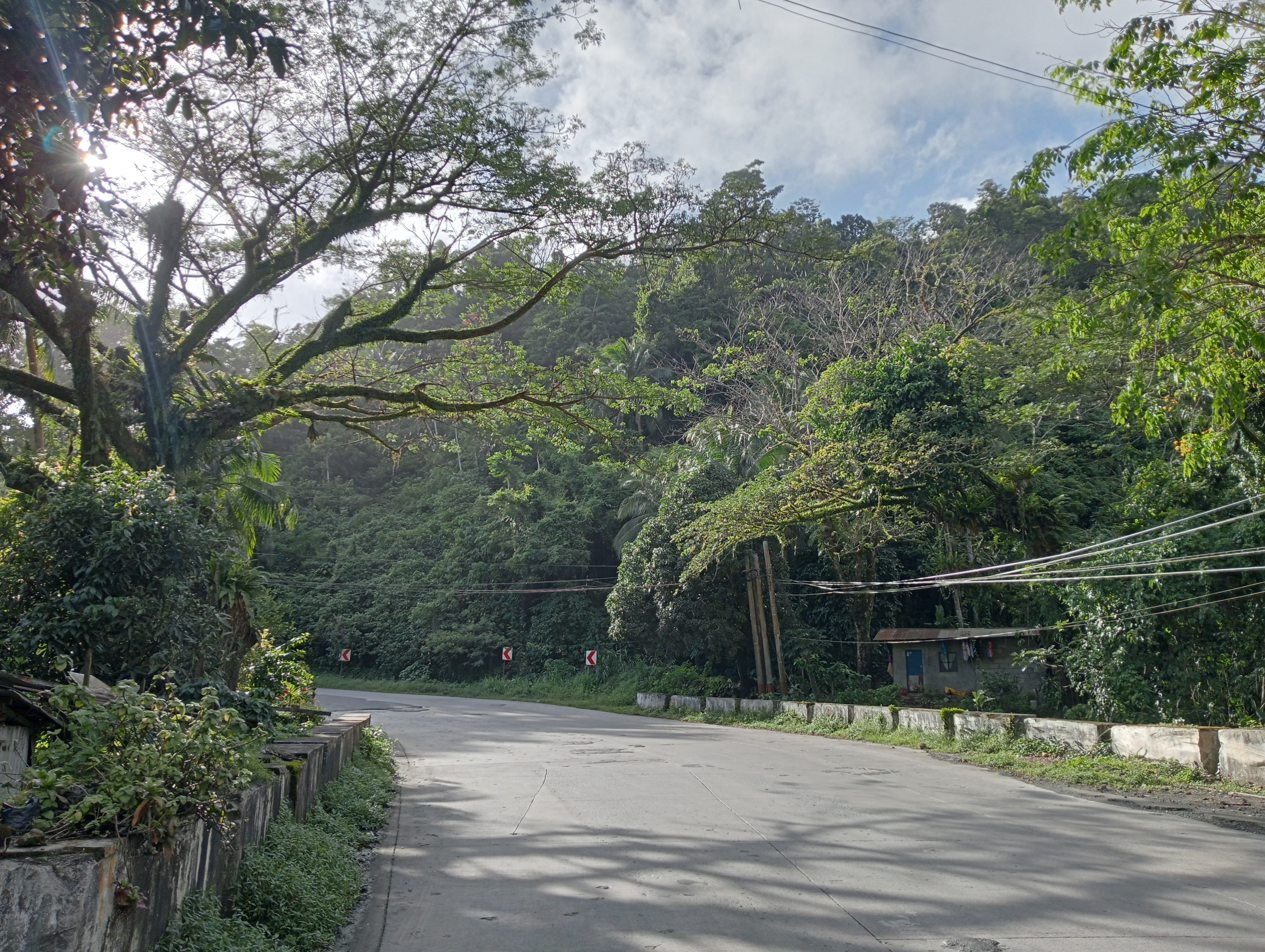
New Diversion Road

The municipality is connected with Manila by the Pan-Philippine Highway. Until 2014, there were also daily rail services to and from Naga and Legazpi provided by the Philippine National Railways. A new Pagbilao station has already been set for construction under the PNR South Long Haul project, a reconstruction of the PNR South Main Line that passes through the area.

In order to spur development in the municipality, the Toll Regulatory Board declared Toll Road 5, the extension of South Luzon Expressway. A 420-kilometer, four lane expressway starting from the terminal point of the now under construction SLEX Toll Road 4 at Barangay Mayao, Lucena City in Quezon to Matnog, Sorsogon, near the Matnog Ferry Terminal. On August 25, 2020, San Miguel Corporation announced that they will invest the project which will reduce travel time from Lucena to Matnog from 9 hours to 5.5 hours.

=== Communications ===
Pagbilao has numerous mobile phone, internet and cable services providers. The following are:

- Dito Telecommunity
- Globe Telecom
- Smart Communications
- Asian Vision Cable Holdings (MyCaTV)

== Education ==
The Pagbilao Schools District Office governs all educational institutions within the municipality. It oversees the management and operations of all private and public, from primary to secondary schools.

Pagbilao has numerous primary and secondary educational institutions. The following are:

=== Primary and elementary schools ===
- Alcastle Educational School
- Bagumbungan Elementary School
- Bantigue Elementary School
- Bigo Elementary School
- Binahaan Elementary School
- Bukal Elementary School
- Casa del Niño Jesus de Pagbilao
- Lord's Angel Learning School
- Malicboy East Elementary School
- Malicboy West Elementary School
- Mapagong-Alupaye Elementary School
- Pagbilao Central Elementary School
- Pagbilao Academy
- Pagbilao East Elementary School
- Pagbilao Family Kiddie School
- Pagbilao West Elementary School
- Palsabangon Elementary School
- Parang-Pinagbayanan Elementary School
- Polo North Elementary School
- Polo South Elementary School
- Talipan Elementary School

=== Secondary schools ===
- Pagbilao Grande Island National High School
- Silangang Malicboy National High School
- Pagbilao National High School
- Quezon National Agricultural School
- Talipan National High School

=== Higher educational institution ===
- CVE Colleges
