= Caparispisan Wind Farm =

Wind farm in the Philippines

Caparispisan Wind farm
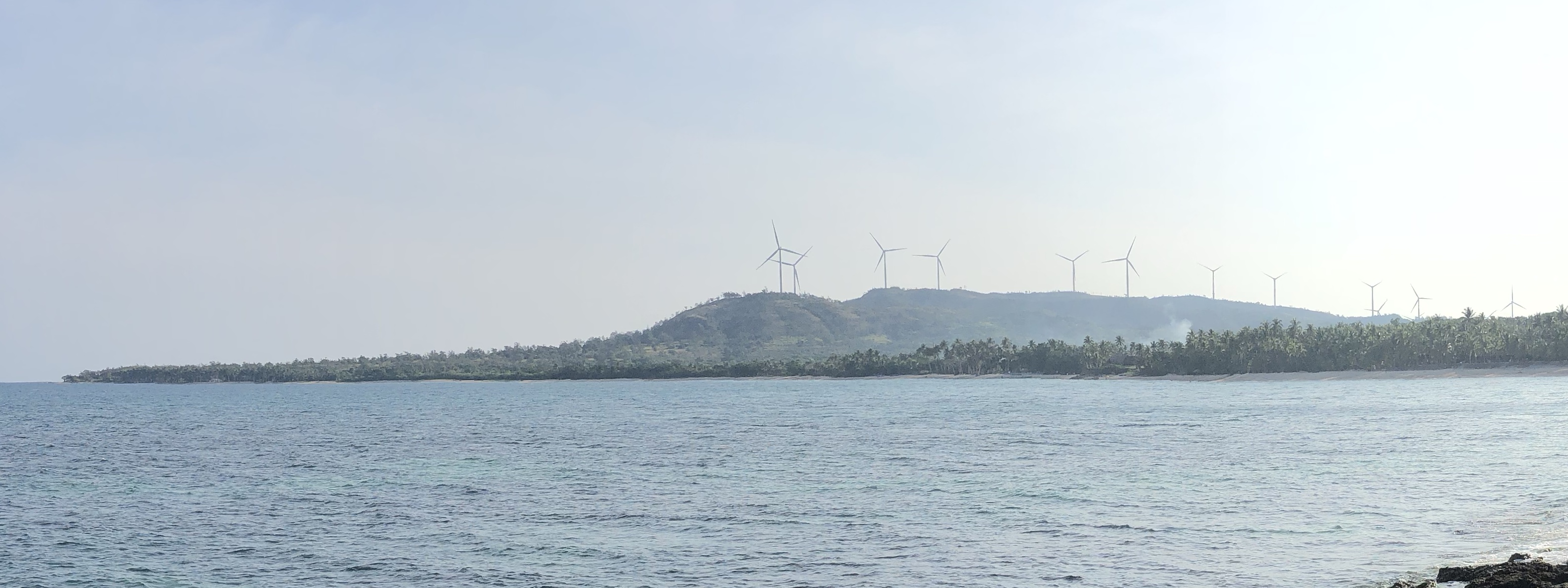
- Caparispisan Wind Farm as viewed from Saud Beach
- Official name: North Luzon Renewables Wind Farm
- Country: Philippines
- Location: Pagudpud, Ilocos Norte
- Coordinates: 18°37′21″N 120°48′37″E
- Status: Operational
- Construction began: September 3, 2013
- Commission date: November 11, 2014
- Operator: North Luzon Renewable Energy Corporation

Wind farm
- Type: Onshore
- Site area: 625 ha (6,250,000 m^{2})

Power generation
- Units operational: 27 X 3 MW
- Nameplate capacity: 81 MW

Caparispisan Wind Farm, also known as the North Luzon Renewables Wind Farm, is a wind farm in Pagudpud, Ilocos Norte, Philippines. The wind farm was a joint venture of AC Energy Holdings, the Philippine Alliance for Infrastructure and the UPC Philippines Wind Holdco. The wind farm project amounted to $220 million.

The wind farm's groundbreaking took place on September 3, 2013, initially planned that the plant be connected to the national grid by June 2014. The wind farm was fully commissioned by the Energy Regulatory Commission on November 11, 2014, and was later inaugurated on November 19 of the same year. The wind farms has 27 individual wind turbines occupying a 625 hectare land area. AC Energy Holdings Inc. planned to increase the wind farms capacity to 81 MW (Safety Factored) by 2015.

Residents belonging to at least 10 families living in barangays Malasin, Abaca, and Dadaur of Bangui, Ilocos Norte protested the installation of a 69 km transmission line, which they claimed passes through their land, and demanded for the transmission line to be relocated.
