= Pililla Wind Farm =

Wind farm in Rizal, Philippines

- Country: Philippines
- Location: Pililla, Rizal
- Coordinates: 14°28′53″N 121°21′09″E
- Status: Operational
- Construction began: June 18, 2013
- Commission date: 2016
- Operator: Alternergy Philippine Holdings Corporation (APHC)

Wind farm
- Type: Onshore
- Site area: 4,515 ha (45,150,000 m^{2})

Power generation
- Units operational: Phase 1 - 27
- Nameplate capacity: Phase 1- 67.5 + Phase 2- 72

External links
- Commons: Related media on Commons

The "Pililla, Rizal" Wind Energy Service Contract granted to Alternergy Philippine Holdings Corporation (APHC) covers an area of 4,515 hectares under Department of Energy WESC NO. 2009-09-018. This Wind Energy Service Contract (WESC) has two phases, Pililla Wind Power Project under WESC NO. 2009-09-018-AF1 and the Mt. Sembrano Wind Power Project under WESC NO. 2009-09-018-AP2.

== Background ==
In December 2008, Alternergy Philippine Holdings Corporation (APHC) was awarded by the Department of Energy (DOE) the exclusive right to develop wind power projects in 3 locations: Pililla in Rizal, Abra de Ilog in Occidental Mindoro, and Kalayaan, Laguna. These locations were among those identified under the Philippine Wind Atlas as potential sites for wind farms due to good to excellent wind resources. APHC was subsequently awarded additional wind energy service contracts in 3 other locations in 2009. APHC is committed to implementing the wind projects if the wind measurements and site-specific studies demonstrate that the power plants are commercially viable.

Phase 1 of this project is a wind farm in Barangay Halayhayin in Pililla, Rizal, Philippines. The wind farm is being undertaken by Alternergy Wind One Corporation. The total cost for the construction of the wind farm is US$177.9 million.

The project consists of 27 wind turbine generators grouped into three clusters with an aggregate capacity of 54 megawatts (MW). The said project, after completion, will interconnect to Meralco's Malaya-Teresa 115 kilovolts (kV) transmission line located just 10 kilometers from the project site.

Phase 2 located in Pililla, Rizal and Mabitac, Laguna was not initially included by Alternergy Philippine Holdings Corporation (APHC) in the Technical Assistance (TA) from the Asian Development Bank. A minor change in the ADB TA implementation was approved in February 2013 to prioritize the development of the Pililla, Rizal wind farm site and expand the study to Pililla Stage 2, which covers the southern portion of the area, as initial findings showed certain limitations in wind resource and constructability in the Laguna and Occidental Mindoro sites. Construction of a wind power project in Abra de Ilog, Occidental Mindoro, in particular, is not feasible until either the National Grid Corporation of the Philippines (NGCP) or the Philippine government has installed a submarine cable connecting Mindoro and Luzon. Based on the initial findings, further studies on the Laguna and Mindoro sites were discontinued; unutilized TA budget for these sites was reallocated instead to fund the study for Pililla Stage 2. The projected cost for Phase 2 is Php 7.056 Billion and its planned output is 72 megawatts (MW).
