= Arothron multilineatus =

Scientific classification
- Kingdom: Animalia
- Phylum: Chordata
- Class: Actinopterygii
- Division: Teleostei
- Order: Tetraodontiformes
- Family: Tetraodontidae
- Genus: Arothron
- Species: A. multilineatus

Binomial name
- Arothron multilineatus Matsuura, 2016

Species of fish

Arothron multilineatus, the multilined pufferfish, is a species of ray-finned fish in the family Tetraodontidae. It is an uncommon fish and is known only from four specimens from Pagbilao in the Philippines, although photographs of individuals in the Ryukyu Islands, Mozambique and the Red Sea show that it has a wide distribution. It was first described by the Japanese ichthyologist Keiichi Matsuura in 2016.

== Description ==
The dorsal fin of A. multilineatus has ten to eleven soft rays and the anal fin has nine to eleven. The body is covered with small spinules except around the eyes and mouth, the gill openings, the fin bases and the sides of the caudal peduncle. This fish grows to a maximum length of 43 cm (17 in). It is characterised by having narrow white convoluted linear markings on a deep greenish-brown background. It is similar in appearance to another rare species, Arothron carduus, which has narrow dark-coloured convoluted lines on a white background.

== Distribution and habitat ==
A. multilineatus is found at depths of between 10 and 25 m (30 and 80 ft) on sandy seabeds in the Ryukyu Islands. Underwater photographs from there, Mozambique and the Red Sea, and documentary evidence from the Philippines, indicate that it has a wide distribution.

== Controversy ==
Pufferfish in the genus Arothron are common in the shallow tropical waters of the Indo-Pacific region. These fish have been extensively photographed and studied, but this large distinctive fish was not described until 2016, the author basing his findings on four specimens from the Philippines and photographs of two specimens from the Red Sea. This raises the question of why such a sizeable fish had not been observed before; a certain minimum population size would have had to exist for the species to be viable.

An alternative hypothesis is that this might not be a valid species at all, but might be an unusually patterned hybrid, perhaps a cross between A. hispidus and A. stellatus. The description was made on the basis of the markings alone, and the confusion will be resolved when a taxonomic revision is done on this genus, including a genetic study.
