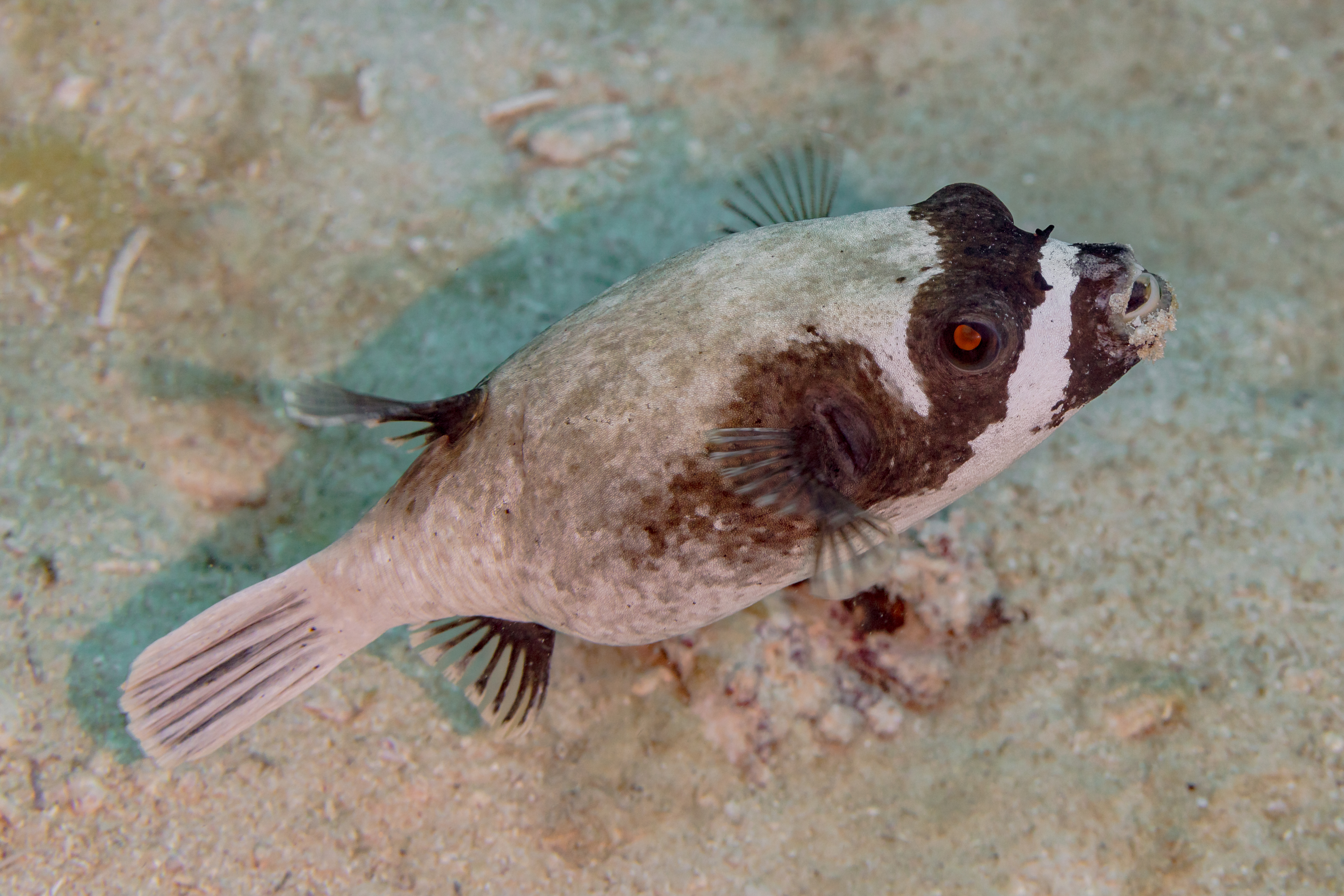

Conservation status
- Least Concern (IUCN 3.1)

Scientific classification
- Kingdom: Animalia
- Phylum: Chordata
- Class: Actinopterygii
- Division: Teleostei
- Order: Tetraodontiformes
- Family: Tetraodontidae
- Genus: Arothron
- Species: A. diadematus

Binomial name
- Arothron diadematus (Rüppell, 1829)

= Masked puffer =

Species of fish

The masked puffer (Arothron diadematus) is a pufferfish in the family Tetraodontidae.

== Distribution ==
Red Sea only.

== Description ==
Maximum length 30 cm, olive-green/grey with a black mask over the eyes and pectoral fins, mouth has a black border. Usually solitary but schools during mating period. Some authors believe this to be a variation of the species Arothron nigropunctatus.

== Habitat ==
Associated with coral reefs, from surface to 20m depth.

== Gallery ==
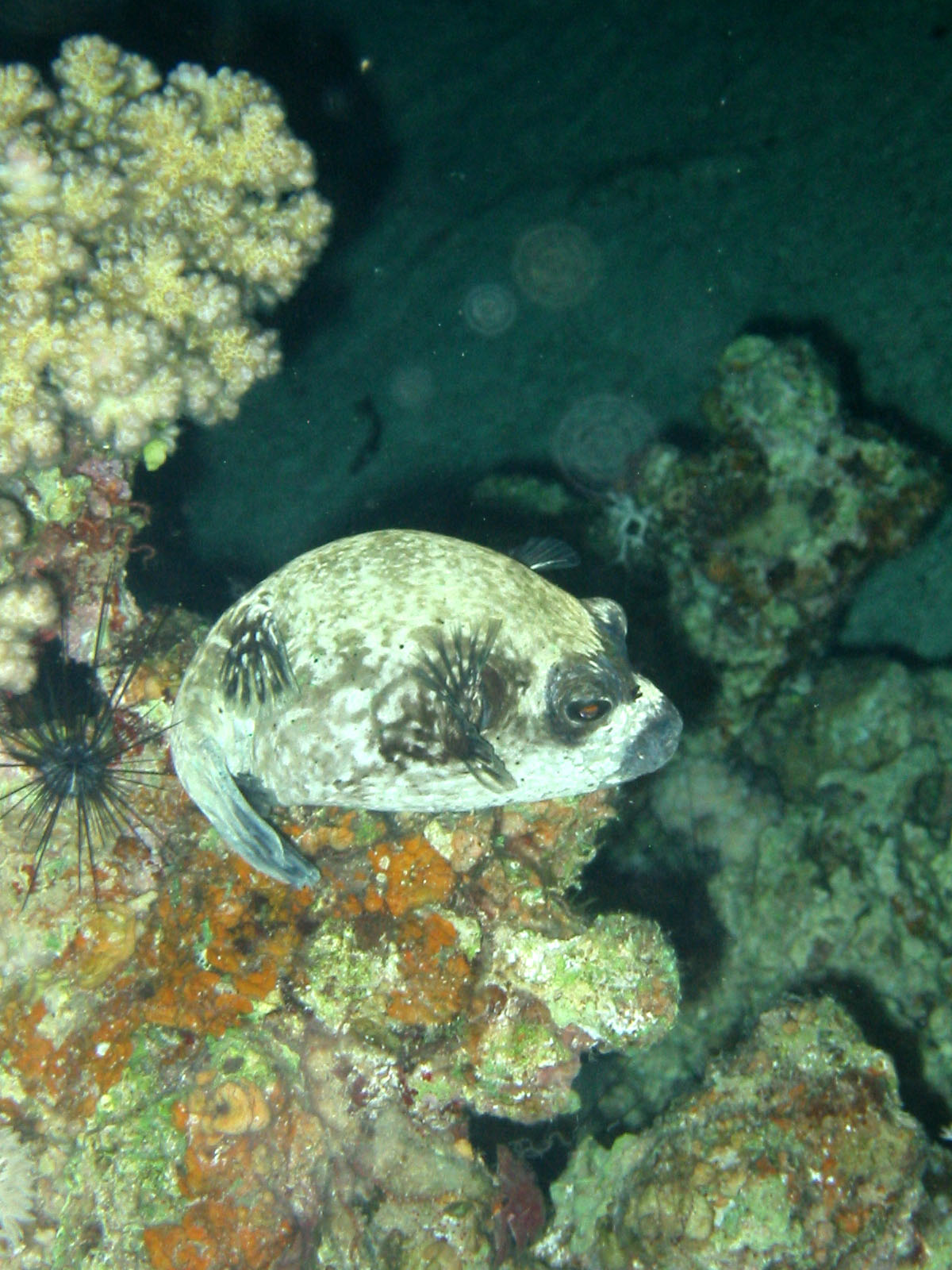
At night, resting (sleeping?) on a coral outcrop

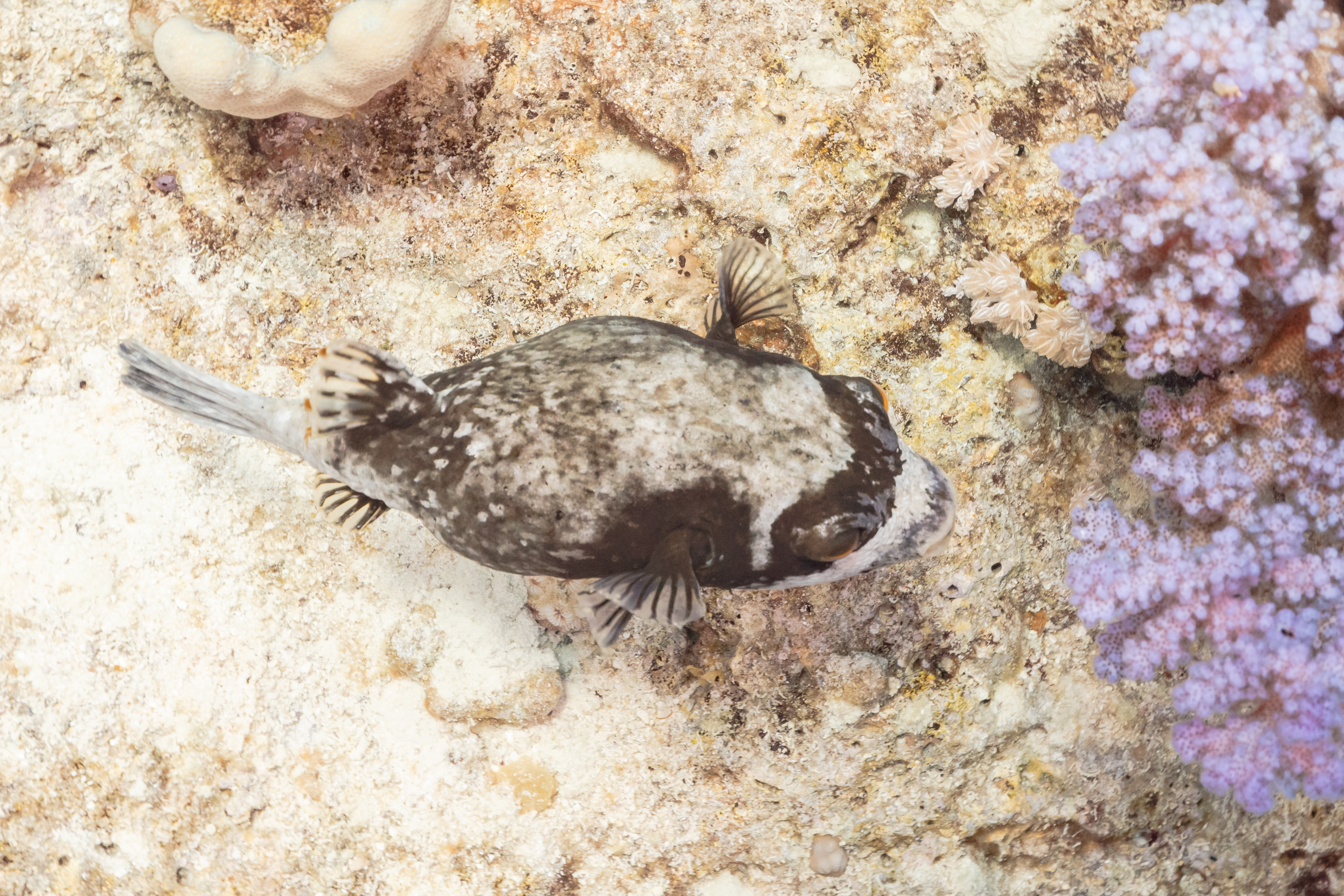
Dorsal view

In the Red Sea

In the Red Sea

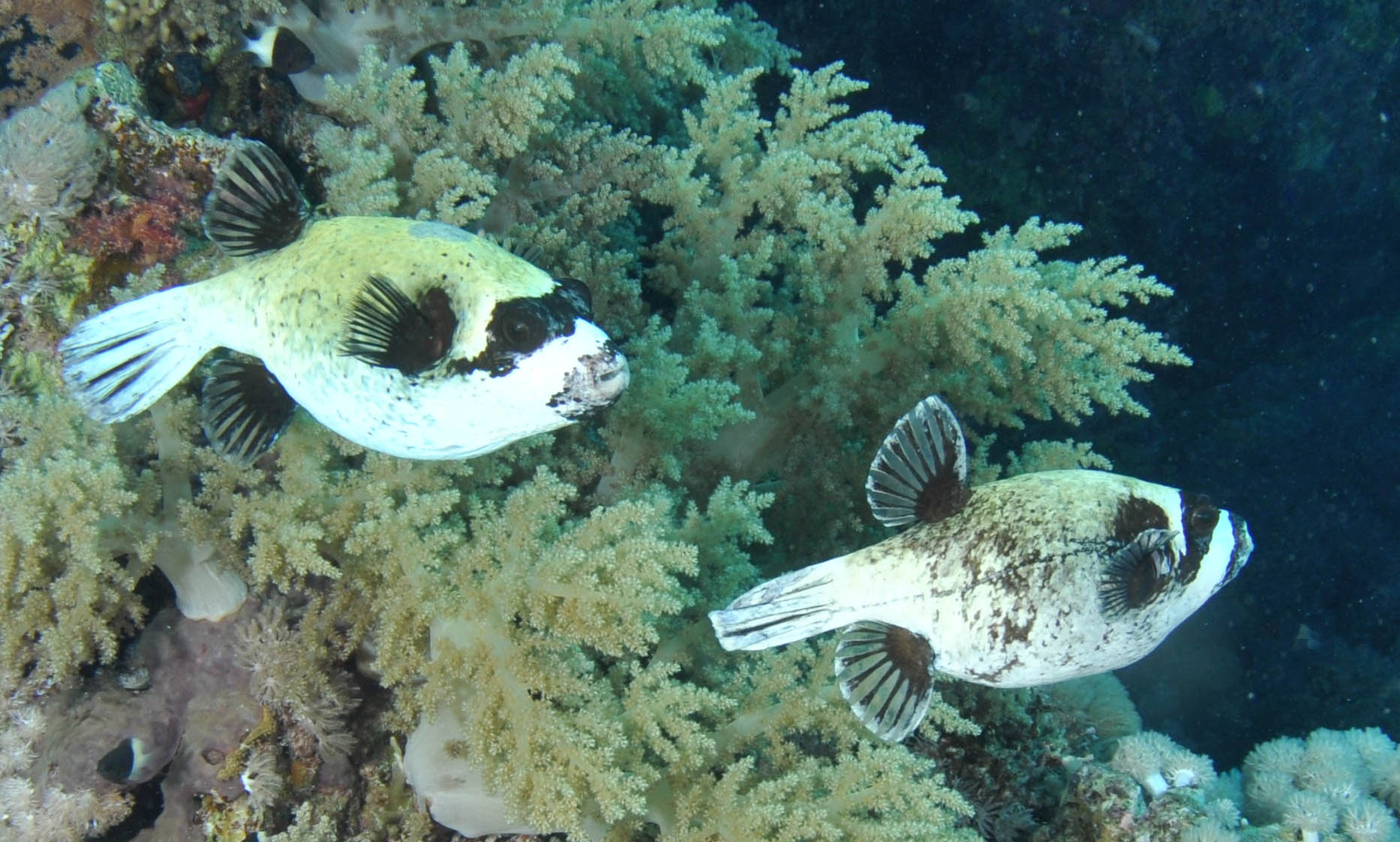
Two masked puffers
