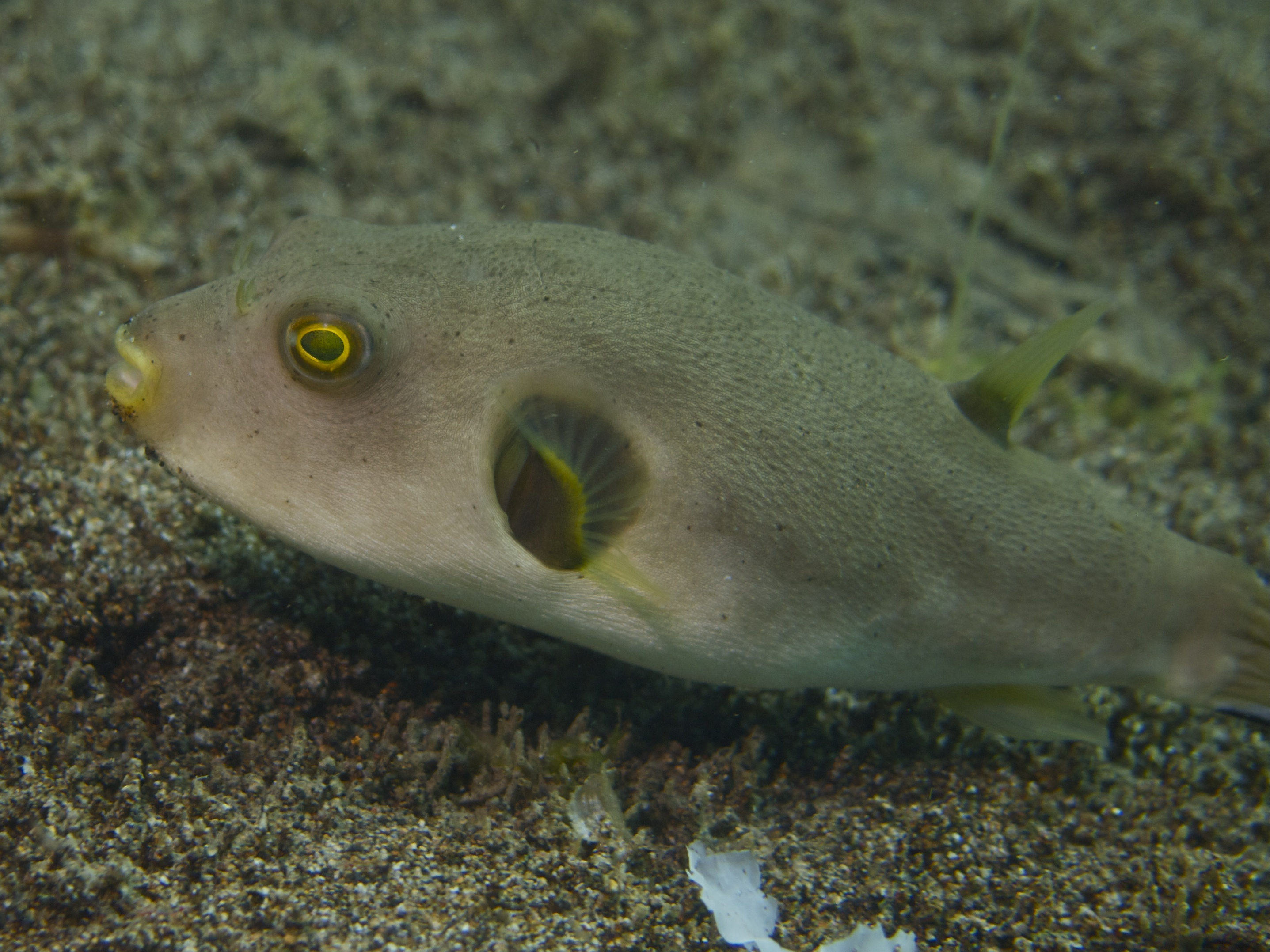
- In the Philippines

Conservation status
- Least Concern (IUCN 3.1)

Scientific classification
- Kingdom: Animalia
- Phylum: Chordata
- Class: Actinopterygii
- Division: Teleostei
- Order: Tetraodontiformes
- Family: Tetraodontidae
- Genus: Arothron
- Species: A. immaculatus

Binomial name
- Arothron immaculatus (Bloch & J. G. Schneider, 1801)

= Arothron immaculatus =

Immaculate puffer

Species of ray-finned fish

Arothron immaculatus, the immaculate puffer or yellow-eyed puffer, is a pale greyish to brownish pufferfish from the Indo-West Pacific. It is a species of marine fish in the family Tetraodontidae.

== Distribution ==
At Réunion

The immaculate puffer is distributed in the Indo-West Pacific Ocean from the northern coast of Australia throughout Indonesia and even as far west as Madagascar and the east coast of Africa. They are usually found on sandy bottoms close to reefs and in lagoons to a depth of 30 meters.

Immaculate puffers are often found hunting in patches of isolated rubble and in fields of sea grasses.

== Description ==
The immaculate puffer is a pufferfish and has a rounded body with a short tail. They have no scales or clear lateral line. They are grey or light brown, though they have the ability to change this to a mottled grey-green coloration presumably used for camouflage. The lips and iris of the immaculate pufferfish are yellow. The caudal fin is yellow, bordered with black.

== Diet ==
The immaculate puffer is primarily carnivorous but has been reported feeding on sea grasses and mangroves as well. Their normal diet consists of crustaceans and mollusks.

== Gallery ==
In Kenya

In South Africa

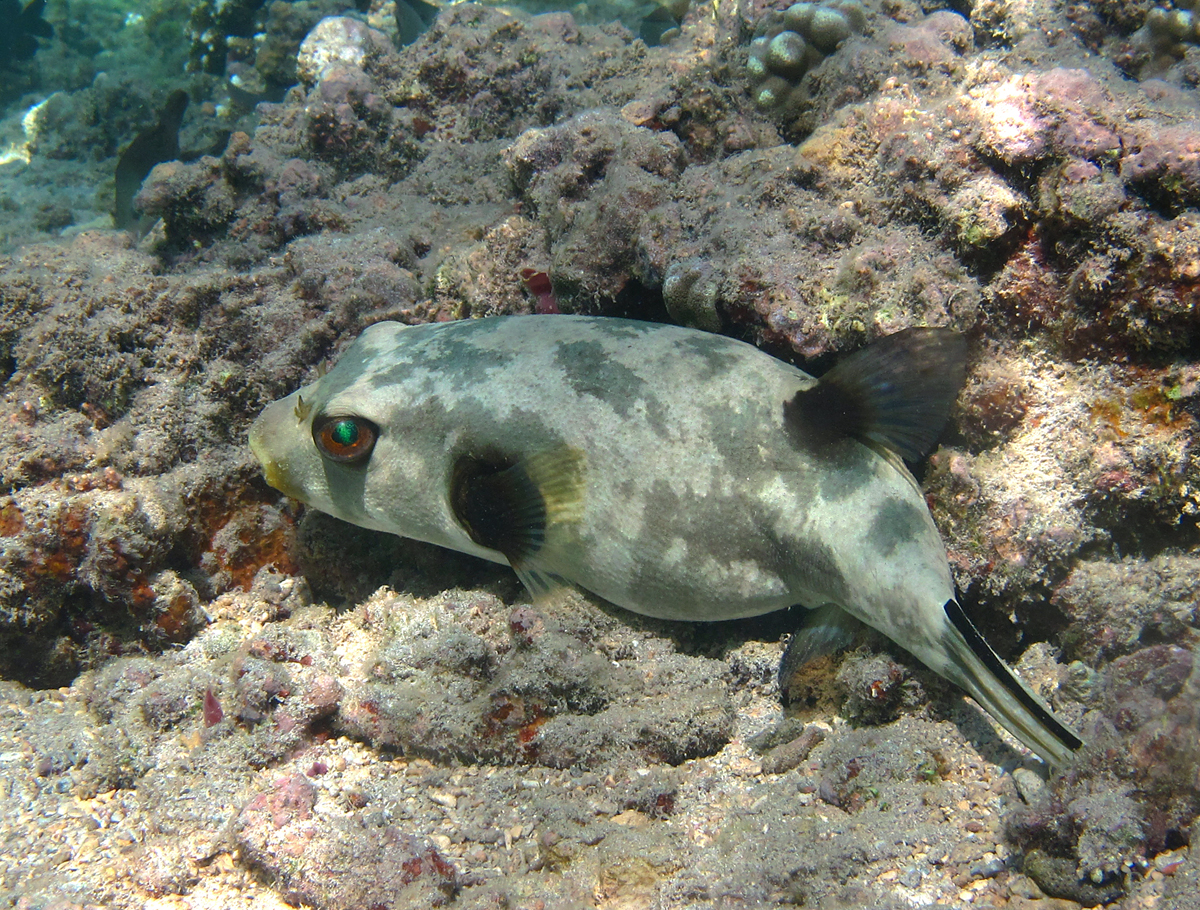
At Réunion
