= Arothron reticularis =

Conservation status
- Least Concern (IUCN 3.1)

Scientific classification
- Kingdom: Animalia
- Phylum: Chordata
- Class: Actinopterygii
- Division: Teleostei
- Order: Tetraodontiformes
- Family: Tetraodontidae
- Genus: Arothron
- Species: A. reticularis

Binomial name
- Arothron reticularis (Bloch & Schneider, 1801)

Synonyms
- Tetraodon reticularis Bloch & Schneider, 1801

Species of fish

Arothron reticularis, variously known as the reticulated pufferfish, reticulated blowfish or reticulated toadfish, is a ray-finned fish in the family Tetraodontidae. It is native to the tropical and sub-tropical Indo-Pacific region where its habitats include sandy and muddy seabeds, coral reefs, estuaries and mangrove areas.

== Distribution and habitat ==
Arothron reticularis is found in the tropical western Indo-Pacific, its range extending from the east coast of India to southern Japan, south to Australia and east to Samoa. It occurs in the sea and in estuaries and brackish water at depths down to about 20 m (66 ft). Suitable habitats include coral reefs near to areas with sand and seaweed, sandy areas, seagrass meadows, and mangrove areas. Juvenile fish are often found among mangroves and sometimes enter the lower parts of streams.

== Description ==
In Indonesia

The reticulated pufferfish grows to a length of about 425 mm (17 in). The body is oblong and of flabby texture and is covered in short spines. The area between the eyes is broad and flat and the nostrils bear a small, solid branched tentacle. The lateral line is indistinct and bends sharply above the anal fin. Both dorsal and anal fins are rounded and have one or two spines and eight or nine soft rays. The body colour is brown or deep grey, with whitish rounded spots on the dorsal surface, giving a net-like appearance. About nine bands of colour, alternately dark and pale, start near the snout and bend round below the eye, the mouth and the pectoral fin base. There is a large blackish blotch on the gill flap and on the base of the pectoral fin. The tail-fin is spotted and the other fins are translucent yellowish-brown.

== Behaviour ==
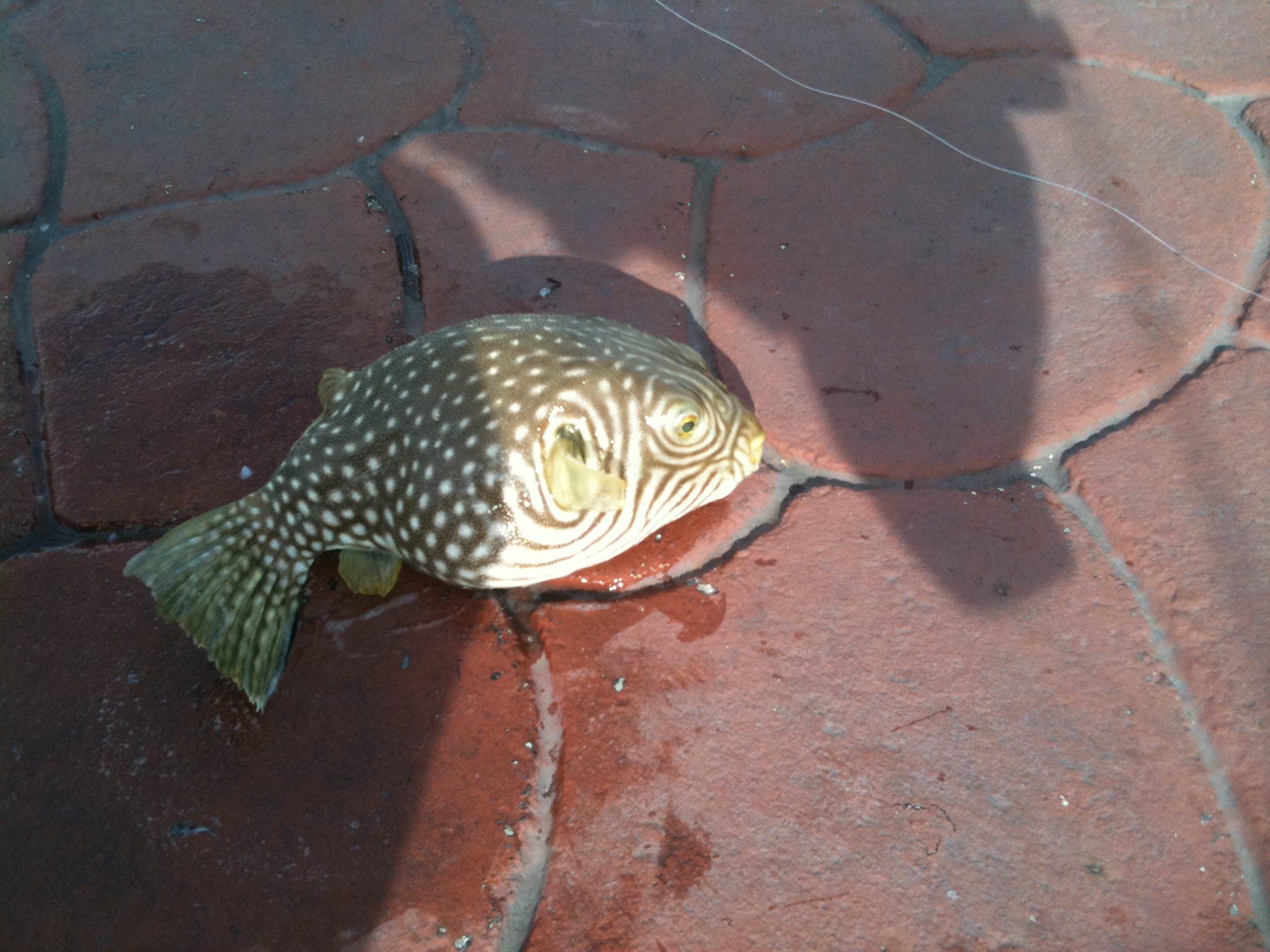
Caught in Singapore

Pufferfish are slow moving fish. They defend themselves by swallowing and filling the stomach with water, thus inflating themselves to intimidating proportions. When the fish is inflated, the spines project; the fish also produces and builds up toxic substances in its skin, gonads and liver, including tetrodotoxin and saxitoxin. During the day, this fish is sometimes found lying on the muddy seabed.

== Status ==
The reticulated pufferfish is common in many parts of its range. Although it is collected to a certain extent for the aquarium trade, it is not thought that this significantly affects populations; however, the coral reefs, seagrass beds and mangrove swamps where it lives are being degraded, which may impact populations in the future. Some of its range is within marine conservation areas and the International Union for Conservation of Nature has assessed its status as being of "least concern".

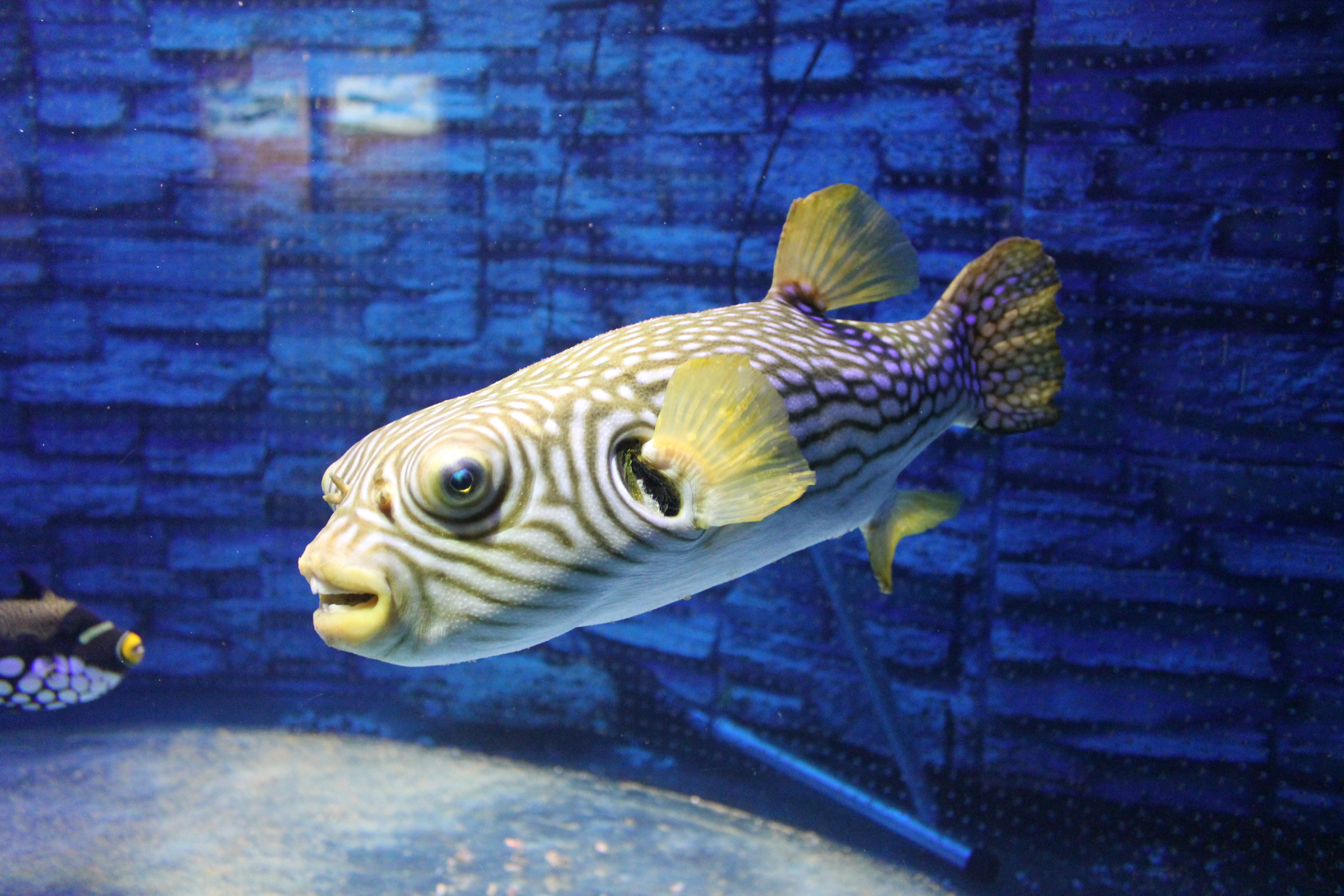
In captivity

In captivity

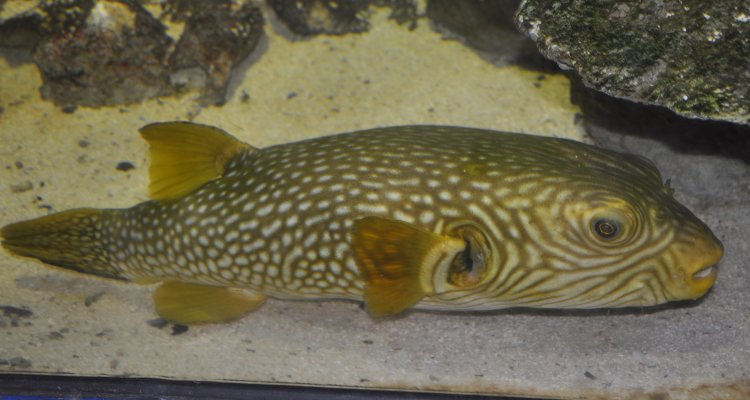
In captivity
