= Arothron caeruleopunctatus =

- In Indonesia

Conservation status
- Least Concern (IUCN 3.1)

Scientific classification
- Kingdom: Animalia
- Phylum: Chordata
- Class: Actinopterygii
- Division: Teleostei
- Order: Tetraodontiformes
- Family: Tetraodontidae
- Genus: Arothron
- Species: A. caeruleopunctatus

Binomial name
- Arothron caeruleopunctatus Matsuura, 1994

Species of fish

Arothron caeruleopunctatus, also known as the blue-spotted pufferfish, is a demersal marine fish belonging to the family Tetraodontidae.

== Description ==
Arothron caeruleopunctatus is a medium-sized fish which grows up to 80 cm (31 in) length. Its body is oval shape, spherical et relatively elongated. The skin is not covered with scales. The fish has no pelvic fin and no lateral line. The dorsal fin and the anal fin are small, symmetric and located at the end of the body. Its snout is short with two pairs of nostrils and its mouth is terminal with four strong teeth.

Its body colors and patterns are variable but the background coloration is blue grey except the ventral part which is whitish, a yellowish blotch with an extremely irregular size and outline covers the dorsal part. The body is also studded with bluish to white spots in rice shape and the eyes are circled with concentric lines.

== Distribution and habitat ==
This species is found in tropical and subtropical waters from the oceanic islands of the Indian Ocean to the western Pacific Ocean. It lives on the external slopes of rocky or coral reefs from the surface to 25 m (80 ft) depth.

== Feeding ==
Arothron caeruleopunctatus feeds on benthic invertebrates.

== Behaviour ==
This pufferfish is active in the daytime, and is solitary and shy.
