= Starry toado =

- In Japan

Conservation status
- Least Concern (IUCN 3.1)

Scientific classification
- Kingdom: Animalia
- Phylum: Chordata
- Class: Actinopterygii
- Division: Teleostei
- Order: Tetraodontiformes
- Family: Tetraodontidae
- Genus: Arothron
- Species: A. firmamentum

Binomial name
- Arothron firmamentum (Temminck & Schlegel, 1850)

Species of fish

The starry toado (Arothron firmamentum) is a pufferfish of the family Tetraodontidae, found in subtropical oceans worldwide, at depths between 10 and 360 m. Its length is up to 40 cm.

== Gallery ==

In Victoria, Australia

In captivity

In Japan

Inflated, in Japan
