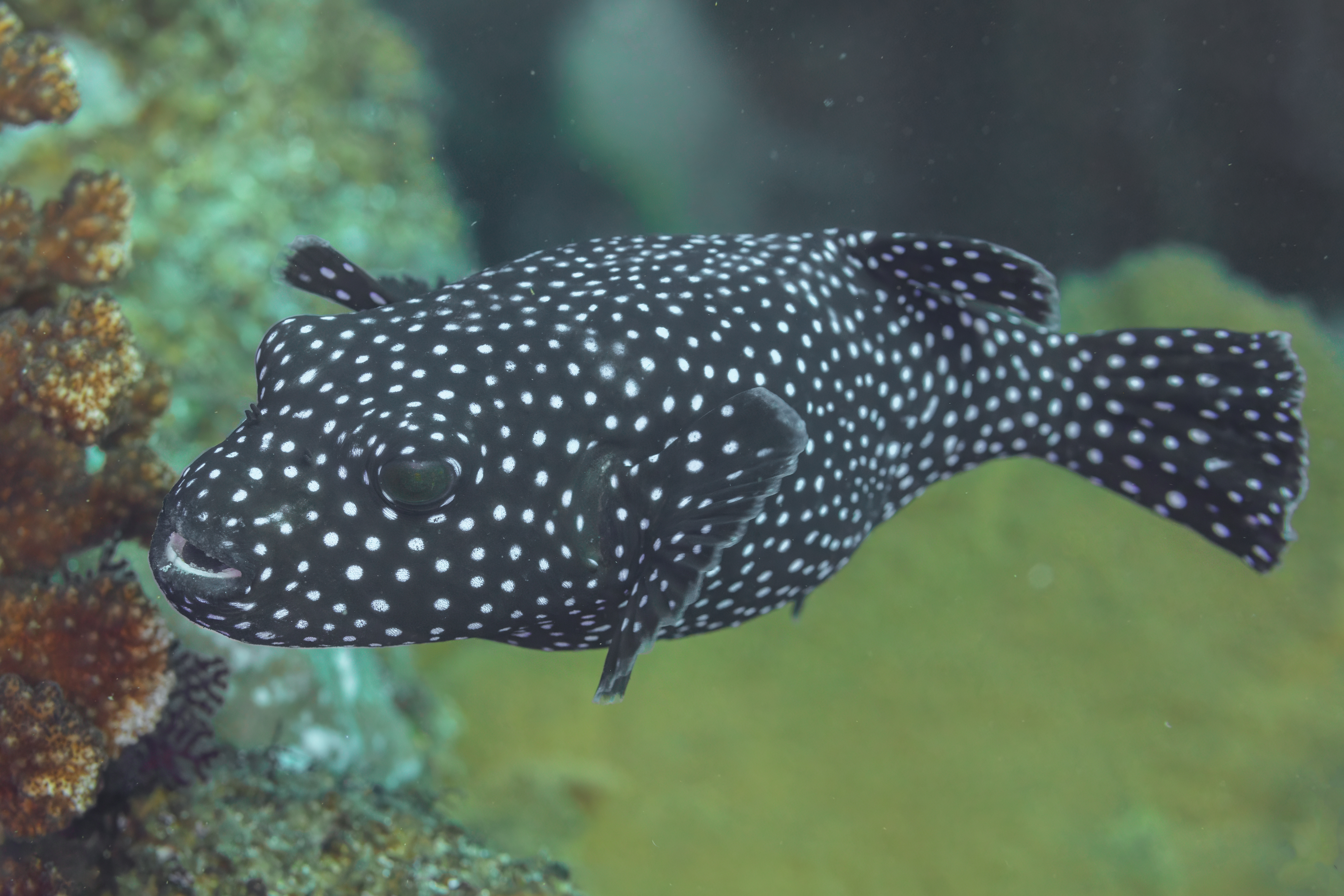

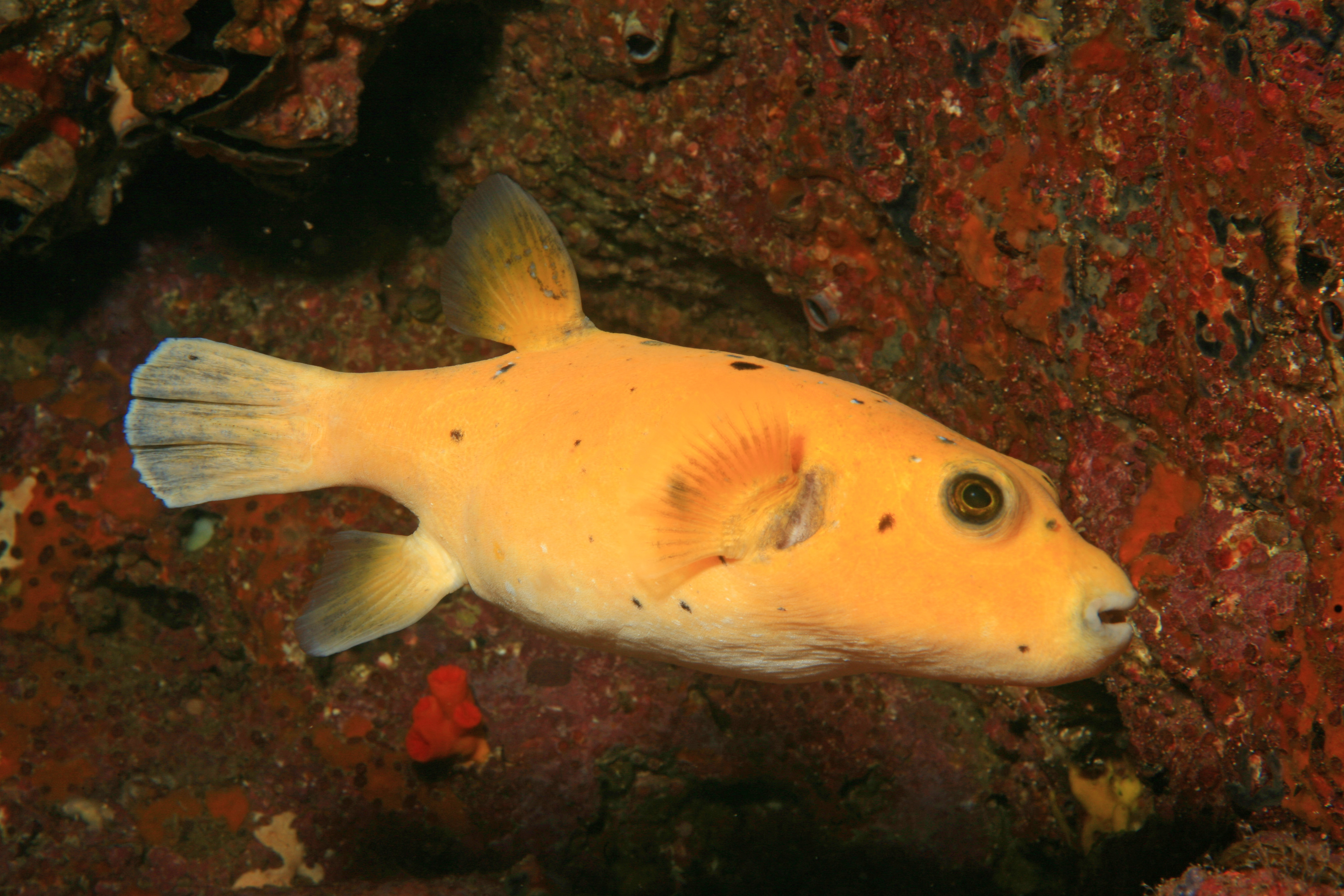

Conservation status
- Least Concern (IUCN 3.1)

Scientific classification
- Kingdom: Animalia
- Phylum: Chordata
- Class: Actinopterygii
- Division: Teleostei
- Order: Tetraodontiformes
- Family: Tetraodontidae
- Genus: Arothron
- Species: A. meleagris

Binomial name
- Arothron meleagris (Anonymous in Lacépède, 1798)

= Arothron meleagris =

Species of fish

Arothron meleagris, commonly known as the guineafowl puffer or golden puffer, is a pufferfish from the Indo-Pacific, and Eastern Pacific. It is occasionally caught for the aquarium trade. It reaches 50 centimetres (20 in) in length.

Guineafowl puffers have heavy rounded bodies that are uniformly black with numerous small white spots (black puffer or botete negro), bright yellow spots (golden puffer or botete dorado) or a mixture of the two morphologies with bright yellow spots and black patches. They have large blunt heads with short snouts and are equipped with a set of massive teeth. They have small and similarly shaped anal and dorsal fins that are well back on their body. Their caudal fin base is long and deep and their caudal fin is rounded. Their body is covered with small denticles that resemble coarse sandpaper. When this fish is scared or frightened, they inflate and make themselves larger, exposing the denticles.

== Description ==
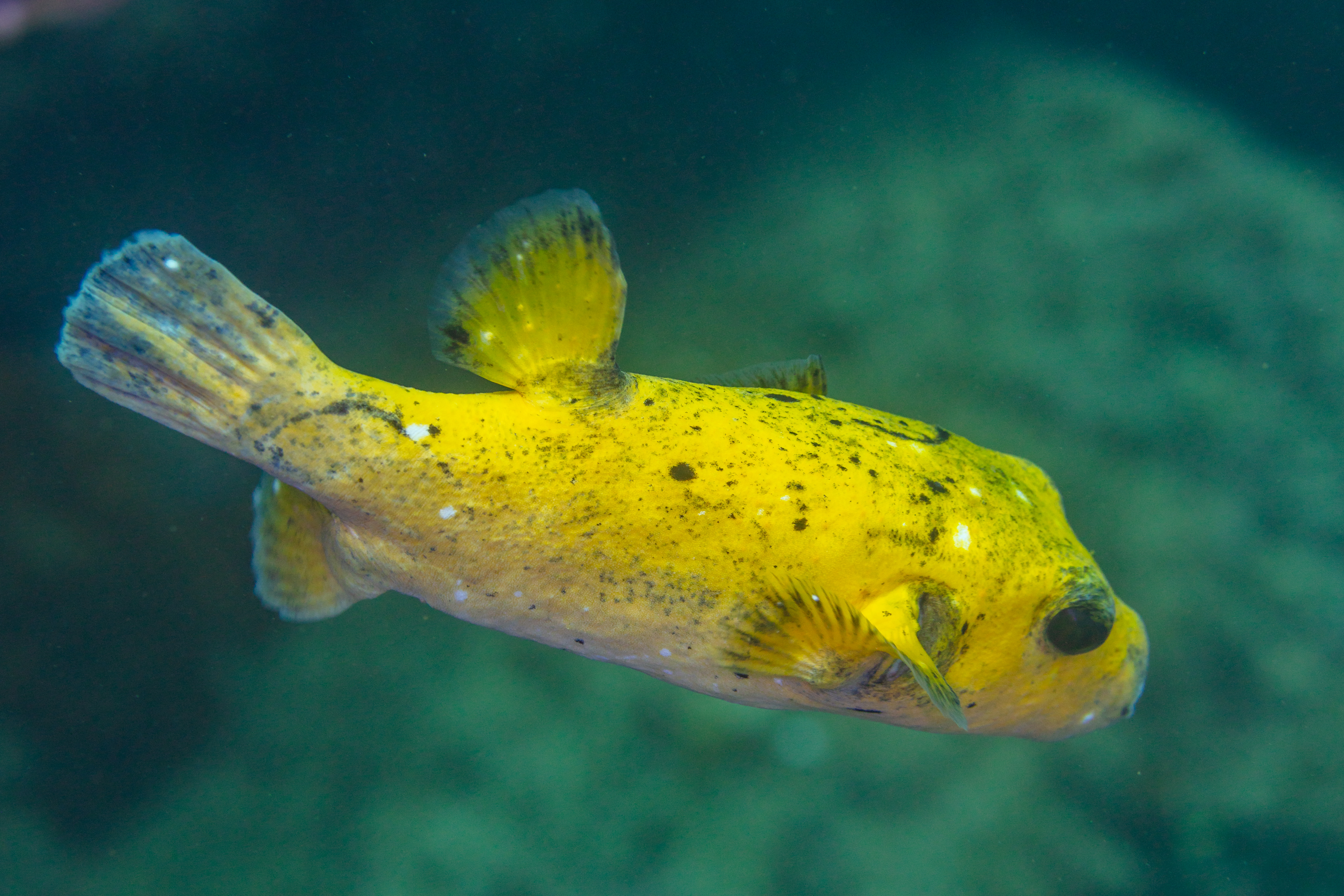
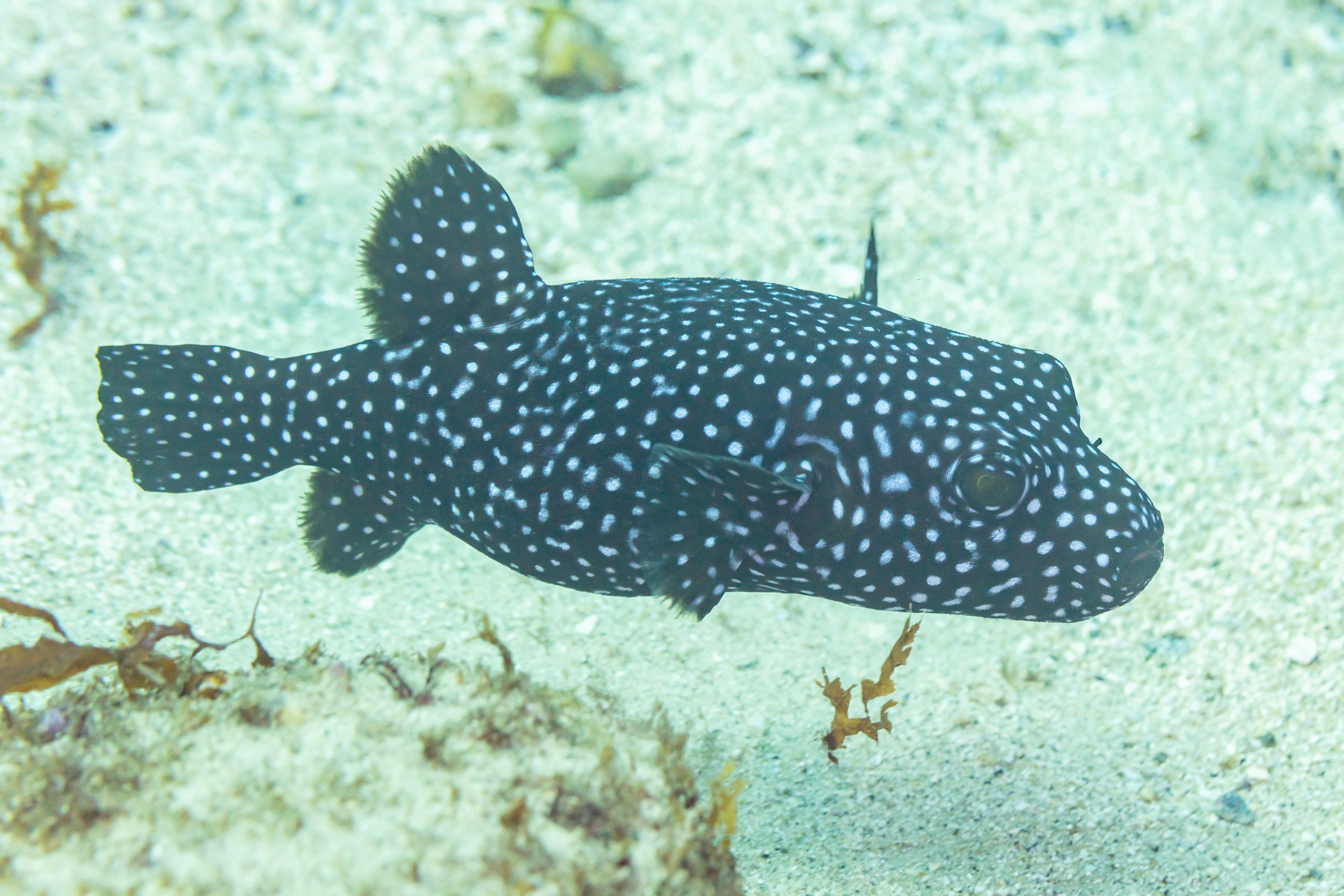
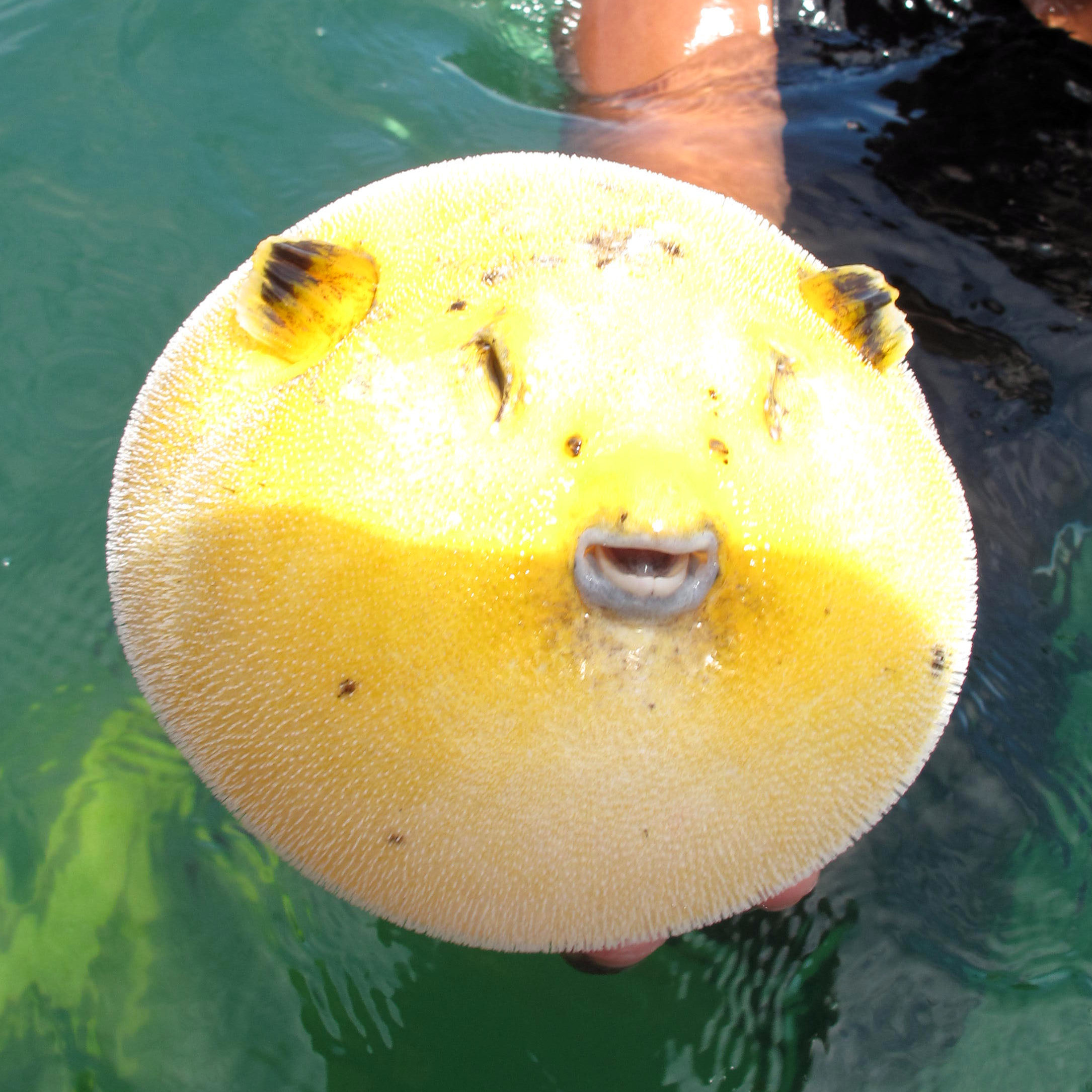
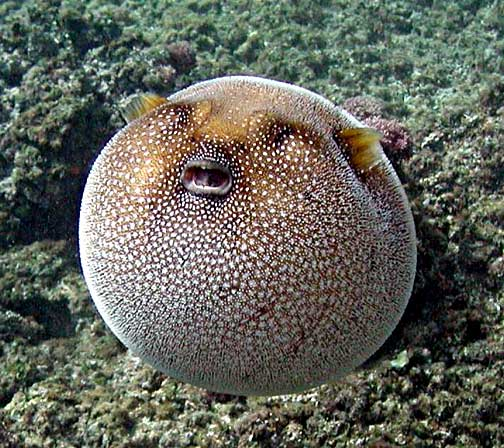
Yellow form (left) and dark form (right)

A. meleagris has three main color phases. The most common color phase includes a dark brown background with many white spots on its whole body. The spots located on the rear of A. meleagris are more minuscule compared to the spots on its sides, a characteristic that is especially prevalent on those that are located in the Indian Ocean. The fins are usually dark brown with white spots and pale edges.

Another color phase is almost uniformly yellow, with a few black spots scattered around its body. The yellowish fins have white edges. The areas near its gills have a light brown patch.

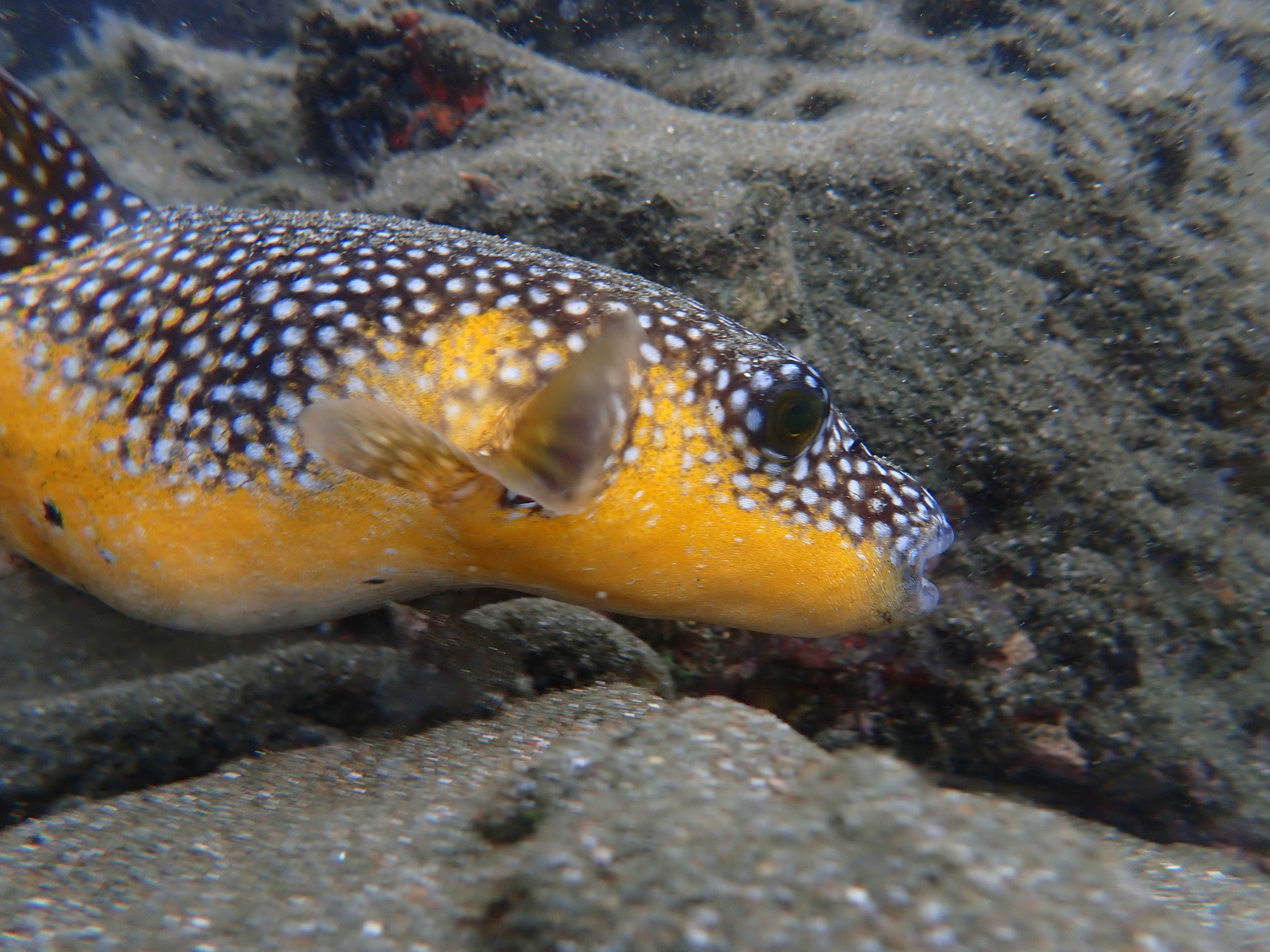
Intermediate colour phase, in Colombia

The third color phase is intermediate between the dark phase and yellow phase, with a great degree of variation.

A survey of museum specimens found that 79% of individuals were dark phase, 10% were yellow phase, and 11% were in an intermediate phase.

Apart from the three most common color variations, there exists several other rarer color patterns found in A. meleagris. An unusual Arothron specimen attributed to A. meleagris was found at Cabo Pulma Reef, in the southwestern Gulf of California. The specimen displayed white lines across a black-purple background instead of white spots. Other features of the specimen include a circular black line around its eye, a black belly and a white reticula. Additionally, its posterior area contained a white line while both its dorsal and anal fin had black stripes over a yellow background.

== Distribution ==
A. meleagris is distributed from the western Indian Ocean along the east coast of Africa, eastward through the Indian and Pacific Oceans to the west coast of Mexico, Colombia, Panama, and Ecuador in the eastern Pacific, north to the Ryukyu Islands, and south to Mangareva in the central Pacific and Easter Island in the south Pacific.

It is not found in the East-Indian area with the exception of the Christmas Island. A. meleagris can also be found in huge abundance within seafaring islands, residing at depths from 3–24 metres (10–80 ft).

== Biology ==
Unlike its congener Arothron hispidus, A. meleagris is not nocturnally active, instead typically hiding at night. During the day, it also does not spend any time hovering above the reef as A. hispidus does. Additionally, while A. hispidus feeds on a variety of benthic invertebrates, A. meleagris has a specialist diet primarily consisting of living stony coral and tunicates encrusting on rocks.

Arothron meleagris primarily swims with its dorsal, anal, and pectoral fins; the tail is usually used for steering. However, they transition to tail-propelled swimming when they need a burst of speed.

Like many other tetraodontids, it has tough skin enveloped in minuscule spiked scales, a beak-like dental plate separated by a median line, and a gill opening similar to an incision anterior to the pectoral fin's base. The bones of the jaw are modified and fused into a sort of "beak" with visible sutures that divide the beaks into "teeth". This is alluded to in their name, with tetra meaning "four" and odous meaning "tooth". It also has the ability to create and store toxins like tetrodotoxin and saxitoxin in its liver, gonads and skin. The level of toxicity also differs depending on the season and geographic location that it is located in.

Pufferfish collectively have the smallest vertebrate genomes that have been discovered so far. Among them, A. meleagris has one of the smallest, at around 375 million bp (MB).

=== Diet ===
While the diet of this species mainly consists of corals and invertebrates such as tunicates, crustose coralline algae, sponges and echinoids, it also varies according to the number of corals within different reefs, such as La Azufrada. In some areas, it acts as a passive generalist, eating corals that are dependent on their abundance, while in others, it acts as an active generalist, increasing its dietary preferences by only consuming uncommon corals.

Coral reefs are one of the most common foods that this species feeds on as they greatly assist with their growth. The availability of food types may affect its diet. This is due to the fact that the predation pressure applied by A. meleagris may rise or fall as the overall population of its prey shifts.

A study by Guzman, Hector M., and D. Ross Robertson in 1989 shows that the diet variations of A. meleagris depend on its food availability. An example is the diet of this species at Caño Island. It was shown in the study that the 1985 red tides at Caño Island had a huge impact on the Pocillopora, a coral species that it feeds heavily on, growing there, greatly decreasing its population. As a result, A. meleagris switched its feeding habits, consuming crustose coralline algae, a food that is plentiful but inferior in quality to the Pocillopora. This species was then observed to switch to a more healthy diet consisting of the next most available coral, Porites. The pufferfish then developed a strong preference for the Porites as a food source.

In addition to corals, several other foods were eaten by this species. At Caño Island, algae was a major part of its diet as they continuously fed on it even with the abundance of corals. On the other hand, A. meleagris rarely consumes algae at the Uva and Secas reefs, preferring to eat corals instead. At the Panamanian locations and at Cocos island, this species acted as a passive generalist while at Caño island, it behaved like an active generalist. Thus, the feeding preferences and habits for A. meleagris differ greatly, being dependent on many factors such as its location and food availability.

==== Effects on coral population ====
Arothron meleagris has been known to consume a large amount of coral reefs within several regions and islands such as Gorgona Island. In a study conducted by Guzman and Lopez, A. meleagris may restore a select number of coral species such as Pocillopora, located in Cano island, if it is able to adjust its feeding habits. On the other hand, it can hinder the recovery of several eastern Pacific Reefs if it continues on consuming rare corals.

Such mass consumption may not come to fruition. Guzman and Lopez noted that rare coral species found in Gorgona Island remain uneaten by A. meleagris due to its inactive behaviour as well as the fact that it directs its eating habit in specific locations within the reef where only a mass amount of single species of coral is available. As a result, it may aid the restoration of coral reefs when consuming specific coral species such as Pocillopora and Psammocora, both of which are found in the lower sections of the reefs. Guzman and Lopez both noted that such restoration of the coral reefs is due to fragmentation and dispersion , as "Coral dispersion and fragmentation have been found to be an important aspect of the recovery of Panamanian and Costa Rican Reefs".

== Conservation ==
Arothron meleagris is highly abundant within the Indian Ocean and the eastern Pacific Ocean reefs while being less commonplace on the rocky reefs of the eastern Pacific. While its population saw a large increase from 1987 to 2002 in Costa Rica, it may be decreasing due to the destruction of its habitats.

Additionally, the marine aquarium trade may also have contributed to the decrease in the population of A. meleagris. This is because it is considered a high-priced product in the marine aquarium trade.

The destruction of the coral reefs, which functioned as A. meleagris habitat and source of food, has caused its population to decline. Starting from 2008, 15% of the coral reefs in the globe faced a hazard of getting to be "effectively lost", meaning that 90% of the corals were in no position to recover. Thus, with a portion of coral reef species being damaged and lost, the population of this species may start to decline.

Outside of its natural habitats, it can be found in aquarium companies as well as retail shops and sold for a substantial fee. Overall, it still a very common species and has a steady population as it is listed as a species of least concern by the IUCN Red List of Threatened Species.

Arothron melagris is traded in the aquarium trade and between 1967 and 2003, 3,813 individuals were exported throughout the States, with a total value of $8,069.7. Specimens of A. meleagris can also be purchased for $199.95–$399.99 in the aquarium trade. The yellow coloured variations of this species are particularly important, with prices reaching US$500.
