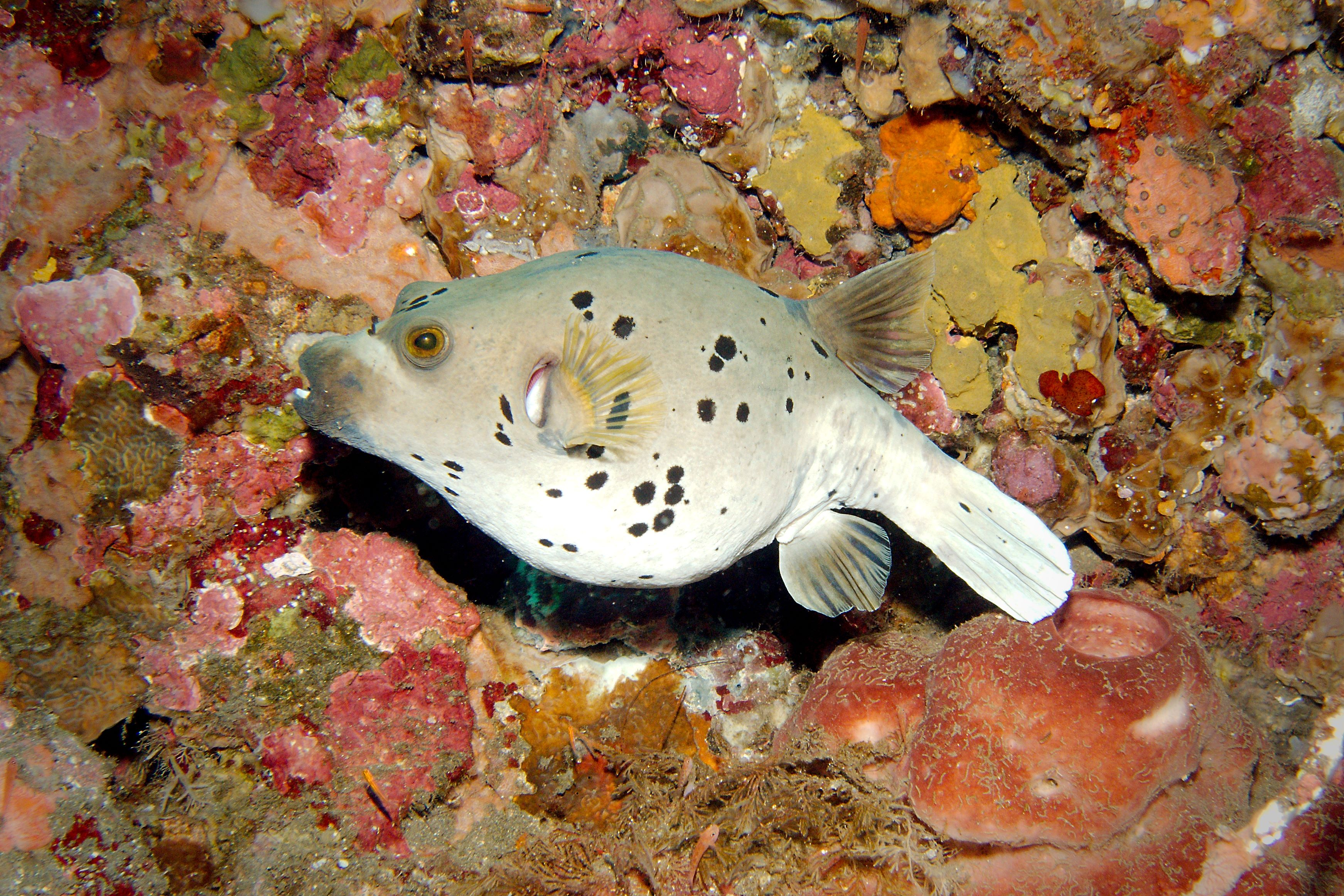

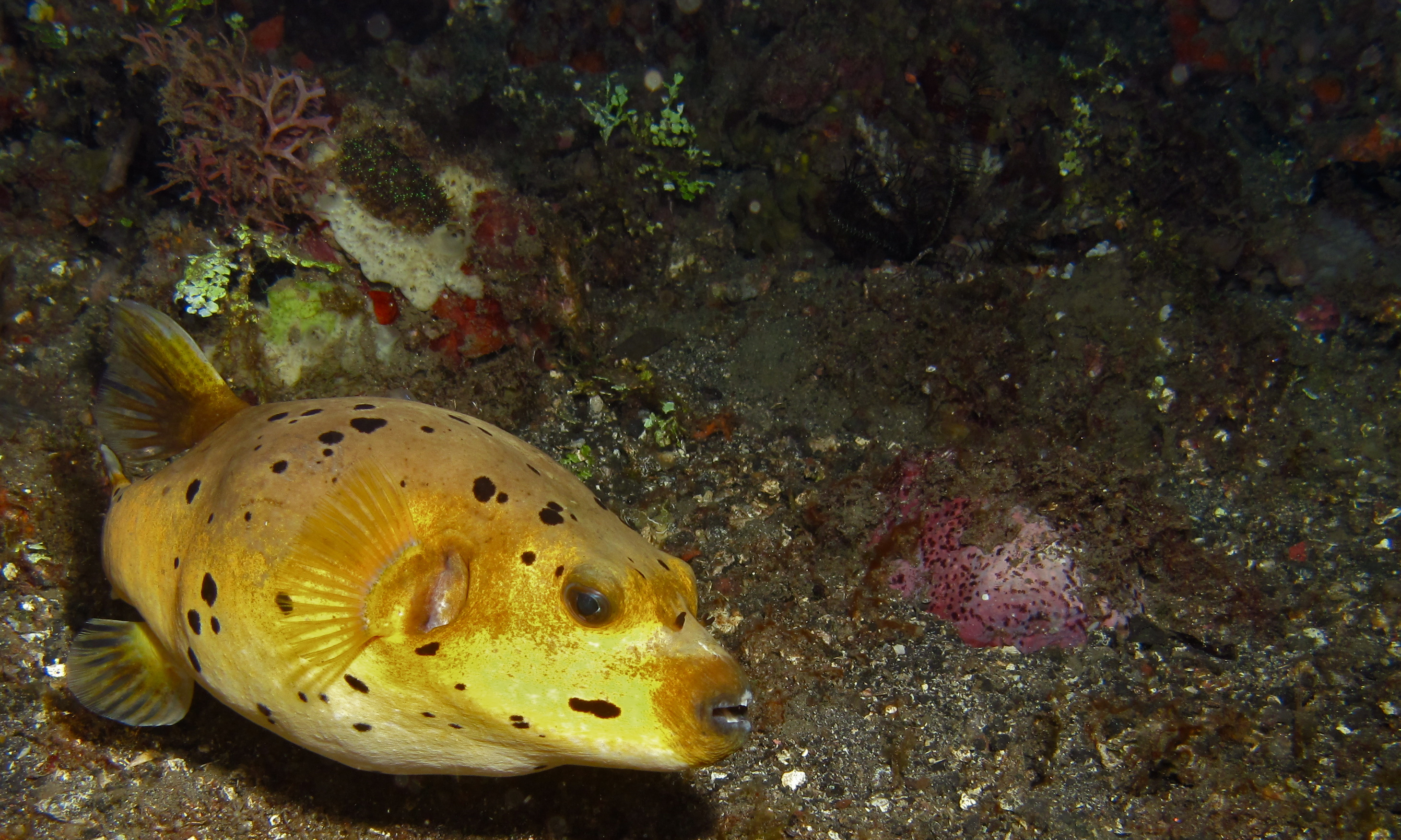
- Typical form above, yellow below

Conservation status
- Least Concern (IUCN 3.1)

Scientific classification
- Kingdom: Animalia
- Phylum: Chordata
- Class: Actinopterygii
- Division: Teleostei
- Order: Tetraodontiformes
- Family: Tetraodontidae
- Genus: Arothron
- Species: A. nigropunctatus

Binomial name
- Arothron nigropunctatus (Bloch & J. G. Schneider, 1801)

= Blackspotted puffer =

Species of fish

The blackspotted puffer (Arothron nigropunctatus), also known as the dog-faced puffer, is a tropical marine fish belonging to the family Tetraodontidae.

== Distribution and habitat ==
This species is found in tropical waters from the Indian Ocean to the central islands of the Pacific Ocean, roughly equalling the Indo-Pacific, except the Red Sea.

It lives close to external reef slopes and lagoons from the surface to 25 m (82 ft) depth.

== Description ==
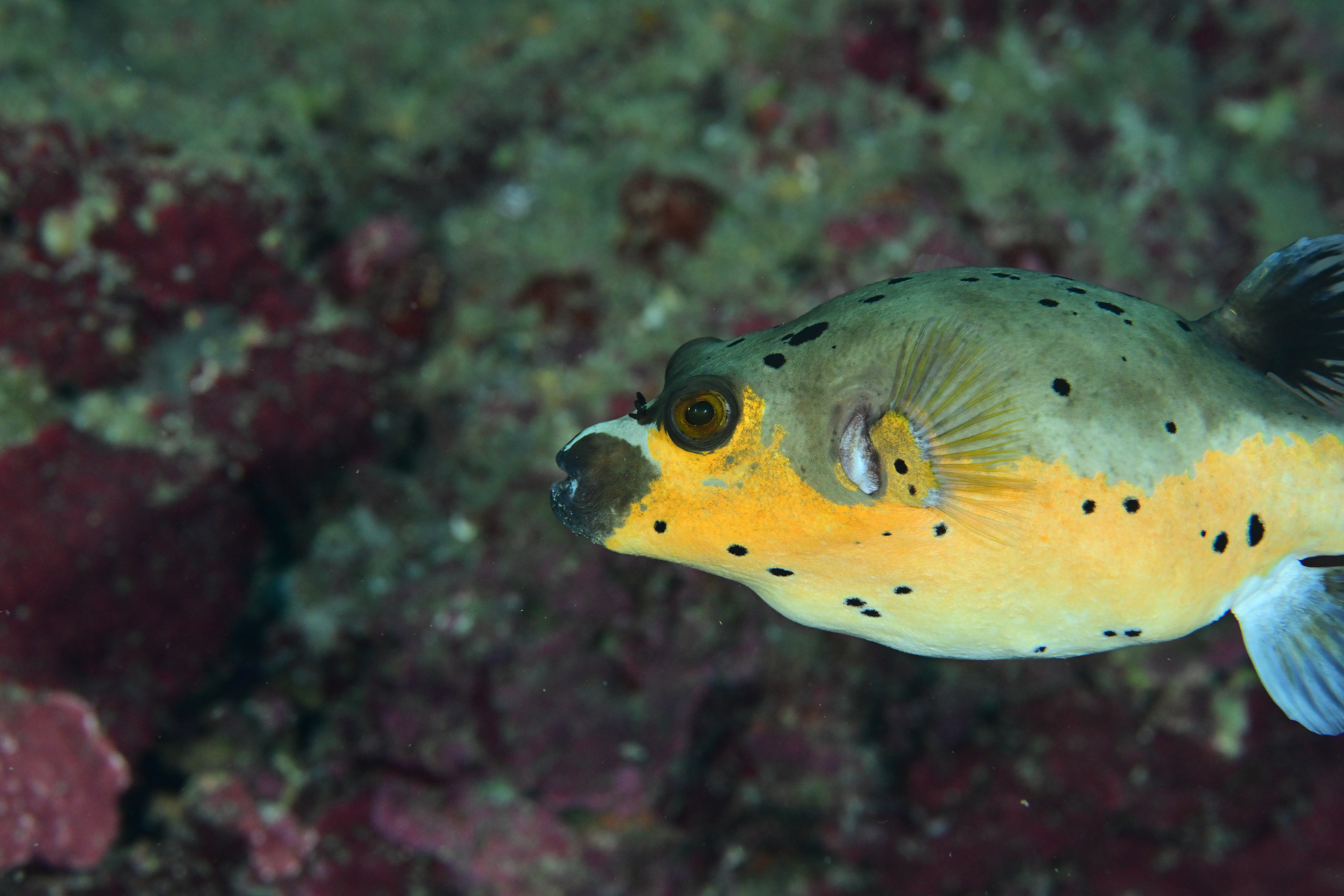
In the Philippines

Arothron nigropunctatus is a small sized fish which grows up to 33 cm (1 ft) length. Its body is oval shape, spherical and relatively elongated. The skin is not covered with scales. The fish has no pelvic fins and no lateral line. The dorsal fin and the anal fin are small, symmetric and located at the end of the body. Its snout is short with two pairs of nostrils and its mouth is terminal with four strong teeth.

The background coloration is variable and can be grey, light brown, bluish, bluish dark, bright yellow, orangey yellow and also sometimes bi-color like bluish and yellow. Dark coloration occurs around the eyes and the mouth. The skin is strewed with dark blotches which vary in size and shape.

The yellow colour morphs of Arothron nigropunctatus are very similar to the yellow colour morphs of Arothron meleagris, but not indistinguishable. The fully yellow morph is far more common in A. meleagris than in A. nigropunctatus, with 10% and 1% of individuals displaying the fully yellow morph respectively. In A. nigropunctatus, the fully yellow morph usually retains the characteristic dark colouration around the mouth, eyes, and base of the dorsal fin. The same morph in A. meleagris has similar black spots, but is otherwise uniformly yellow all over the body.

Suspected hybrids between the two species have also been observed at Réunion Island.

== Feeding ==
Arothron nigropunctatus feeds on benthic invertebrates, sponges, tunicates, algaes, coral like Acropora tips, crustaceans and mollusks.

== Behaviour ==
This pufferfish is diurnal, solitary and territorial.

== Defense ==
Arothron nigropunctatus holds the deadly poison tetrodotoxin, which protect it from predators. In order to ward off potential enemies, they can inflate their bodies by swallowing air or water.

== Gallery ==
Partially yellow, in the Philippines

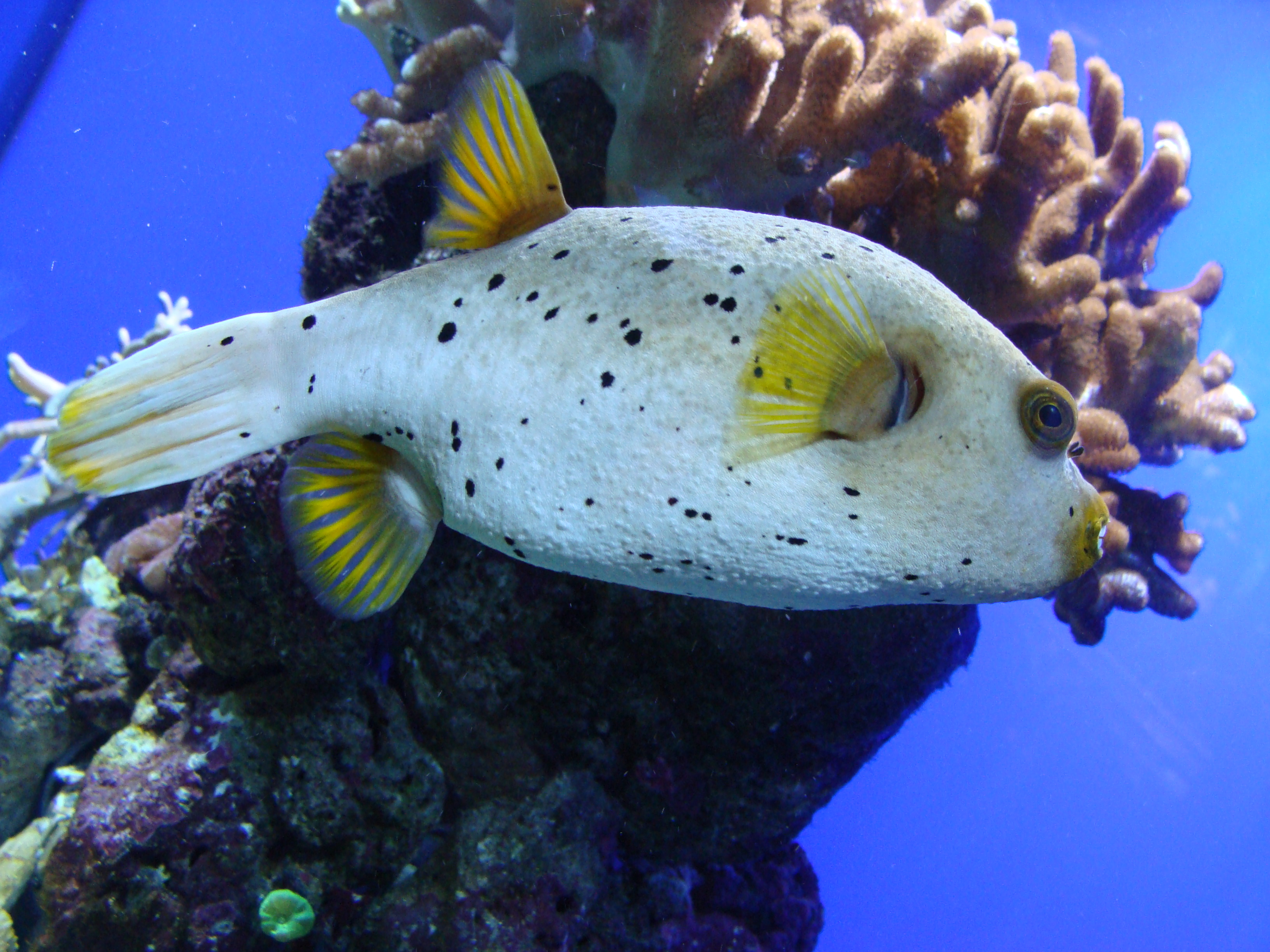
Unusually yellow dorsal fin, in captivity

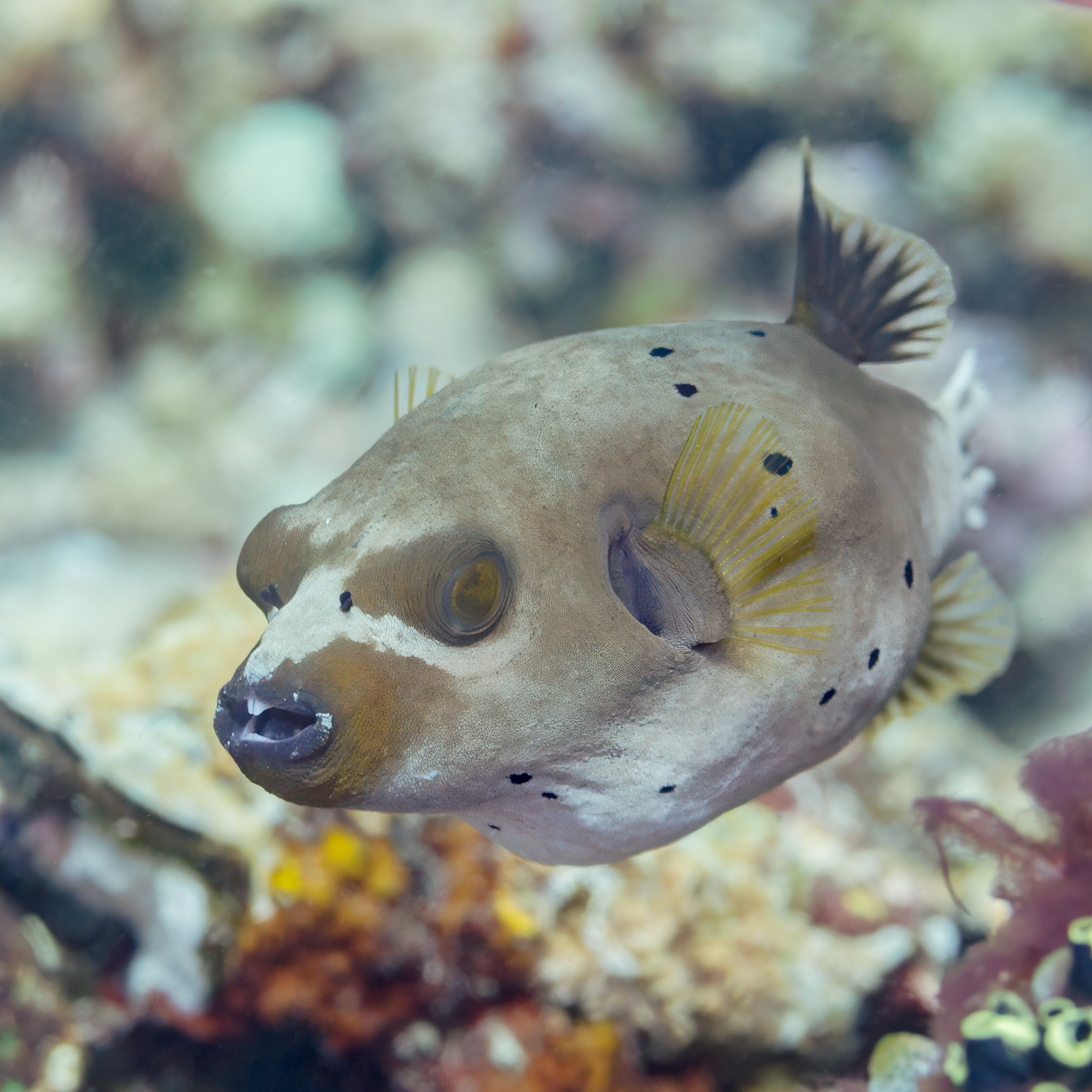
In the Philippines
