= Bellystriped blaasop =

Conservation status
- Vulnerable (IUCN 3.1)

Scientific classification
- Kingdom: Animalia
- Phylum: Chordata
- Class: Actinopterygii
- Division: Teleostei
- Order: Tetraodontiformes
- Family: Tetraodontidae
- Genus: Arothron
- Species: A. inconditus

Binomial name
- Arothron inconditus Smith, 1958

Species of fish

The bellystriped blaasop (Arothron inconditus) is a species of pufferfish that grows up to 40 cm and lives in South Africa.

== Distribution and habitat ==
Arothron inconditus lives in waters from 1 to 20 m (3 ft 3 in to 65 ft 7 in) deep. It is native to South Africa, living in subtropical environments, in sandstone tide pools, beaches, and river mouths.

== Ecology ==
In South Africa

It is a colonial sessile insectivore. The juveniles of this species are 36–65 mm (1.4–2.6 in) in length. It is an oviparous fish.

== Conservation ==
It occurs in at least one marine protected area, yet it still has threats elsewhere, including pollution, climate change, residential development, and commercial development, so it is listed as Vulnerable by the IUCN Red List.
