= Map puffer =

Conservation status
- Least Concern (IUCN 3.1)

Scientific classification
- Kingdom: Animalia
- Phylum: Chordata
- Class: Actinopterygii
- Division: Teleostei
- Order: Tetraodontiformes
- Family: Tetraodontidae
- Genus: Arothron
- Species: A. mappa

Binomial name
- Arothron mappa (Lesson, 1831)

Species of fish

The map puffer (Arothron mappa), also known as the map pufferfish, scribbled pufferfish, or Kesho-fugu, is a demersal marine fish belonging to the family Tetraodontidae. It is typically found in tropical and subtropical waters from the Indian Ocean to the western Pacific Ocean.

This fish contains tetrodotoxin, a potent and deadly chemical compound used to ward off predators. Despite being highly poisonous, the map puffer can be found both in the aquarium trade and certain food markets.

== Distribution and habitat ==
Arothron mappa is found in tropical and subtropical waters from the Indian Ocean to the western Pacific Ocean. Adults can be found along both deep drop-offs and clear lagoon and sheltered reefs from the surface to 30 m depth. Juveniles can be found on seagrass beds.

== Description ==
In Indonesia

Arothron mappa grows up to 65 cm length. Its body is oval, spherical yet relatively elongated. The skin is not covered with scales, rather, the majority of the map puffer's body is covered with small dermal spines with the exception of areas around the mouth, pectoral fin base, and caudal fin base.

The fish has no pelvic fin and no lateral line. The dorsal fin and the anal fin are small, symmetric and located at the end of the body. Its snout is short with two pairs of nostrils and its mouth contains four strong teeth which have fused into an edged beak. These teeth continue to grow throughout A. mappa's entire life, and must be constantly dulled by consuming hard-shelled prey.

The background coloration is whitish with dense network of black, brown or greenish broken lines, with an irradiant line departure from the eye. Depending on specimen, some dark or yellowish blotches can occur around the mouth, the symmetrical anus, on the fins or anywhere on the body.

== Biology ==
In Indonesia

In Thailand

Arothron mappa feeds on benthic invertebrates, crustaceans, sponges and algaes.

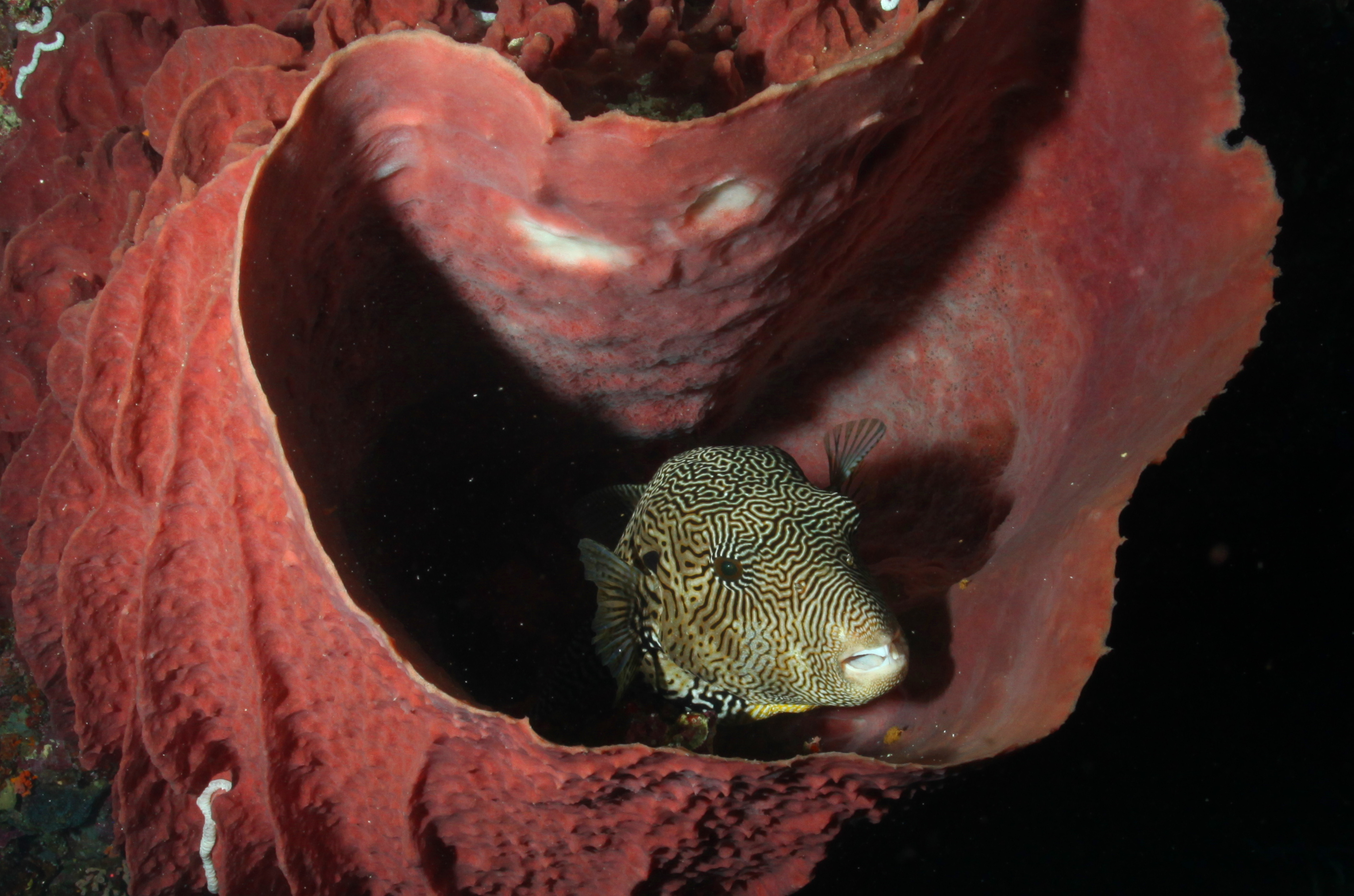
Inside an Indo-Pacific giant barrel sponge

This pufferfish is diurnal and exhibits solitary behavior.

=== Reproduction ===
Courting begins when an A. mappa male constructs a large flattened circle in a substrate by using its fins to dig and stir up sand particles. The male will then dig geometric valleys and ridges within the circle to create a complex and geometric maze-like pattern. This acts as both a mating display to attract females and a nesting site for eggs to be laid. When a female A. mappa approaches a nest, the male will swim around and stir the sand to draw the female's attention. If the courtship ritual is successful, the female will enter the nest and release her eggs, which the male then fertilizes. Fertilized eggs will remain and develop within the nest until they hatch into a planktonic larval stage.

=== Toxicity ===
Arothron mappa contains tetrodotoxin - an extremely toxic sodium channel blocker which protects it from predators. A. mappa do not manufacture the tetrodotoxin compound themselves, rather, it is produced by endosymbiotic bacteria within the pufferfish that is passed down through the food chain.

=== Parasites ===
Several invertebrate species are known to parasitize Arothron mappa and other Tetraodontiforme fishes. The Aporocotylidae species of Psettarium yoshidai is found exclusively in the map puffer, and two nematode species in the genus Philometra (Philometra robusta and Philometra pellucida) can be found in the map puffer and other Tetraodontiformes. Aforementioned Philometra species cause severe swelling and distention of the gut in Tetraodontiformes. Cases of extreme infection and bloating caused by Philometra in an individual pufferfish can result in their rapid ascension to surface waters and consequent predation due to lack of shelter and mobility.

== As food ==
Despite containing tetrodotoxin, several species of pufferfish are eaten in Japan. One study shows that the level of toxicity in the flesh of map puffers is considered acceptable for human consumption. Nonetheless, the skin, liver, gonads, and intestines of the map puffer should not be consumed, as they contain high concentrations of tetrodotoxin.

Specialized training is required to prepare a puffer fish containing tetrodotoxin for consumption, as to not contaminate the edible flesh with tetrodotoxin contained within the fish's skin and organs.

== Gallery ==
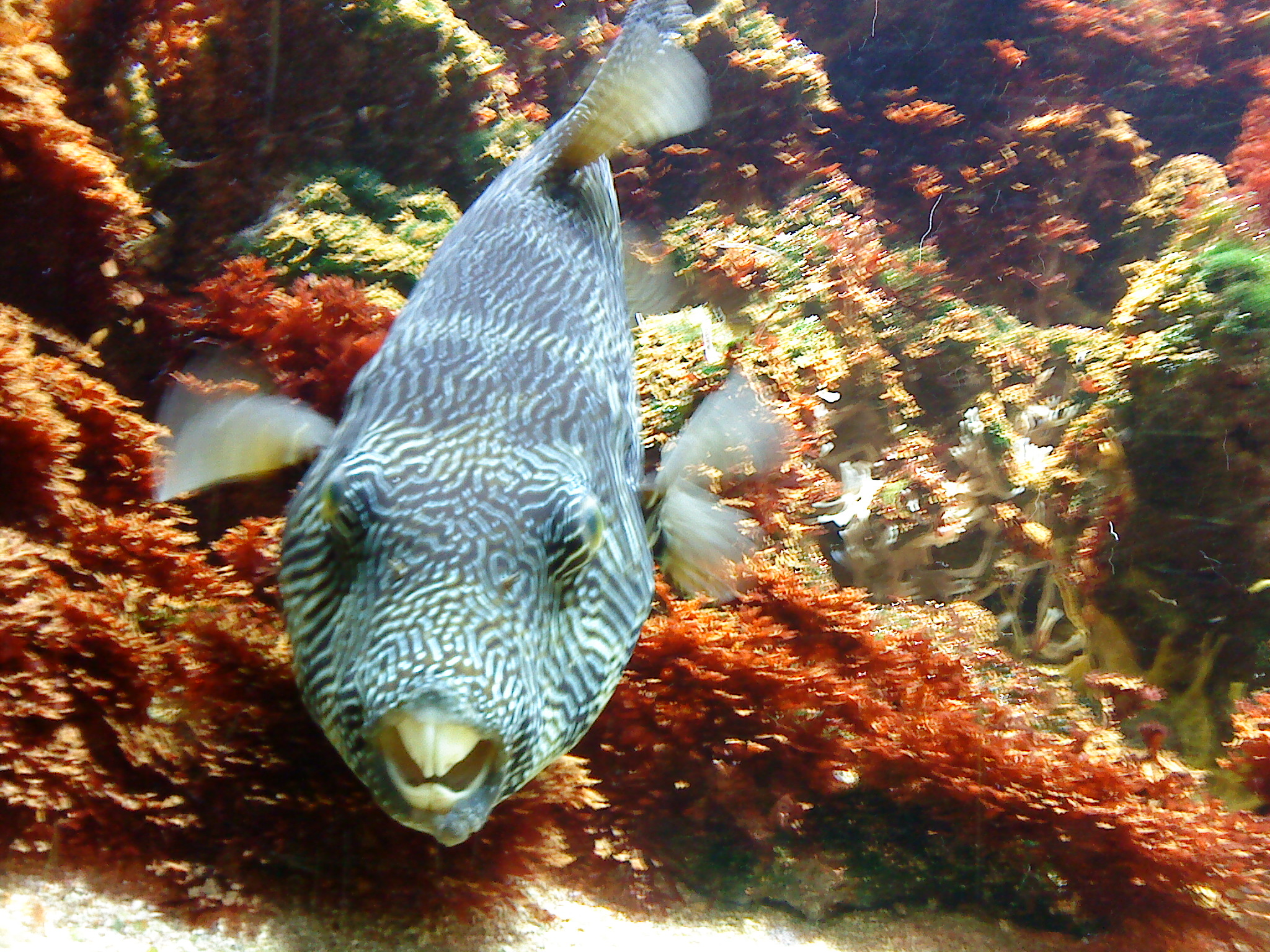
Showing teeth

At Wakatobi National Park, Indonesia

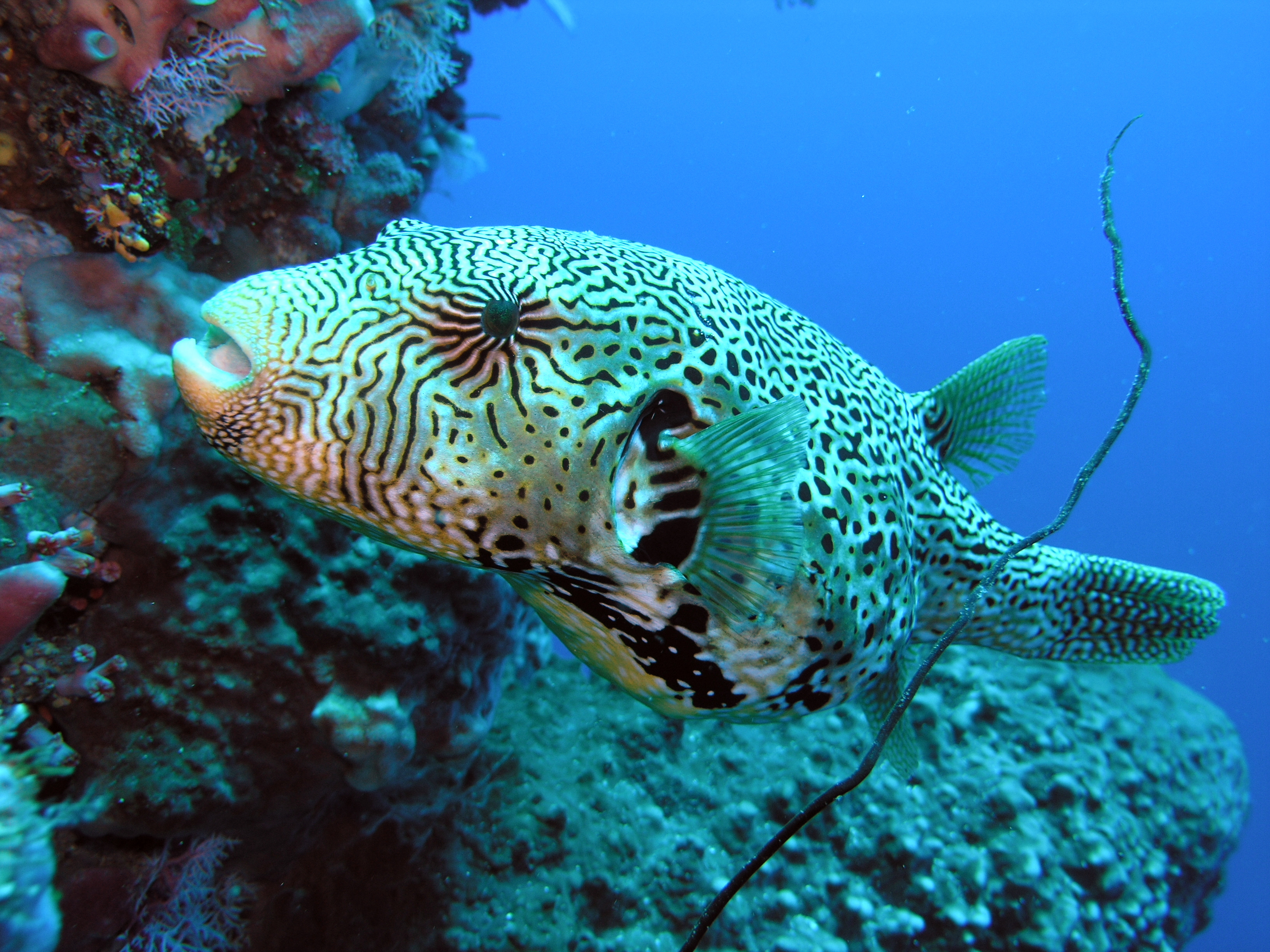
In Indonesia

Closeup, showing the radiating pattern around the eyes
