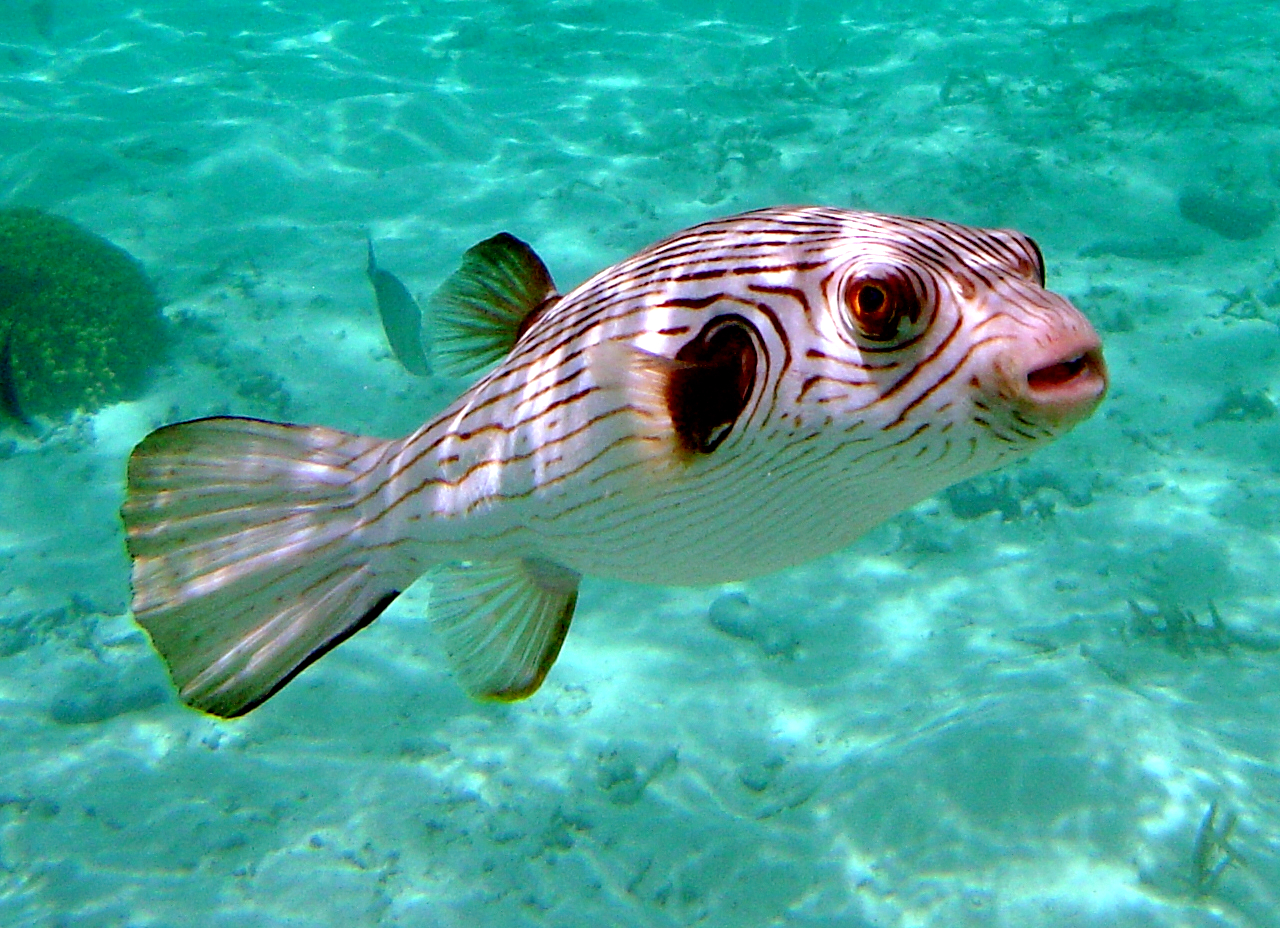
- Narrow-lined puffer (Arothron manilensis)

Scientific classification
- Kingdom: Animalia
- Phylum: Chordata
- Class: Actinopterygii
- Division: Teleostei
- Order: Tetraodontiformes
- Family: Tetraodontidae
- Subfamily: Tetraodontinae
- Genus: Arothron; J. P. Müller, 1841

Diversity
- 14 species

= Arothron =

Genus of fishes

Arothron is a genus of pufferfish that belongs to the family Tetraodontidae. Arothron species inhabit coastal waters, with the exception of A. firmamentum. While they are highly toxic due to the presence of tetrodotoxin, several species are eaten in Japan. Arothron species are sometimes kept in aquaria.

== Distribution ==
They have a wide range of distribution being found in warm parts of the Atlantic, Indian and Pacific Ocean.

== Evolution ==
Phylogeny with 12 of the 14 species

The oldest described specimens of this genus are dated to the early Pleistocene epoch around 1.95-1.35 million years ago. They were uncovered in the Liuchungchi Formation in southern Taiwan. They are semi-articulated specimens with nearly complete skulls that show characteristic beak-like jaws.

== Description ==
Patterns of 7 species of Arothron. It is hypothesized that species with reticulated patterns (D-F) may have hybrid origins; the result of blending the patterns of one parent with dark spots and a light background, and a parent with light spots and a dark background.

The largest species is A. stellatus, which can reach 1.2 m (3.9 ft) in length.

They can be distinguished from other genera of pufferfish through the combination of the presence of a bifurcated fleshy protuberance at each nostril, and a single continuous lateral line on each side of the body without a branch above the anus. While Chelonodon and Tetraodon also have the bifurcated nostril tentacles, their lateral lines branch down towards the anus.

Two species in particular, A. meleagris and A. nigropunctatus, are especially polymorphic. Alongside their typical forms, they also have fully yellow forms, as well as forms intermediate between the two.

== Species ==
There are currently 14 recognized species in this genus:

Image	Species	Common name
	Arothron caeruleopunctatus Matsuura, 1994	Blue-spotted puffer
	Arothron carduus (Cantor, 1849)	
	Arothron diadematus (Rüppell, 1829)	Masked puffer
	Arothron firmamentum (Temminck & Schlegel, 1850)	Starry puffer
	Arothron hispidus (Linnaeus, 1758)	White-spotted puffer
	Arothron immaculatus (Bloch & J. G. Schneider, 1801)	Immaculate puffer
	Arothron inconditus J. L. B. Smith, 1958	Belly-striped puffer
	Arothron manilensis (Marion de Procé, 1822)	Narrow-lined puffer
	Arothron mappa (Lesson, 1831)	Map puffer
	Arothron meleagris (Anonymous, referred to Lacépède, 1798)	Guineafowl puffer
	Arothron multilineatus Matsuura, 2016	Many-lined puffer
	Arothron nigropunctatus (Bloch & J. G. Schneider, 1801)	Black-spotted puffer
	Arothron reticularis (Bloch & J. G. Schneider, 1801)	Reticulated puffer
	Arothron stellatus (Anonymous, referred to Lacépède, 1798)	Stellate puffer

Synonyms

- Arothron aerostaticus (Jenyns, 1842) valid as Arothron stellatus
- Arothron gillbanksii (Clarke, 1897) valid as Arothron firmamentum
- Arothron leopardus (Day, 1878) valid as Chelonodon leopardus
- Arothron perspicillaris (Rüppell, 1829) valid as Arothron hispidus
