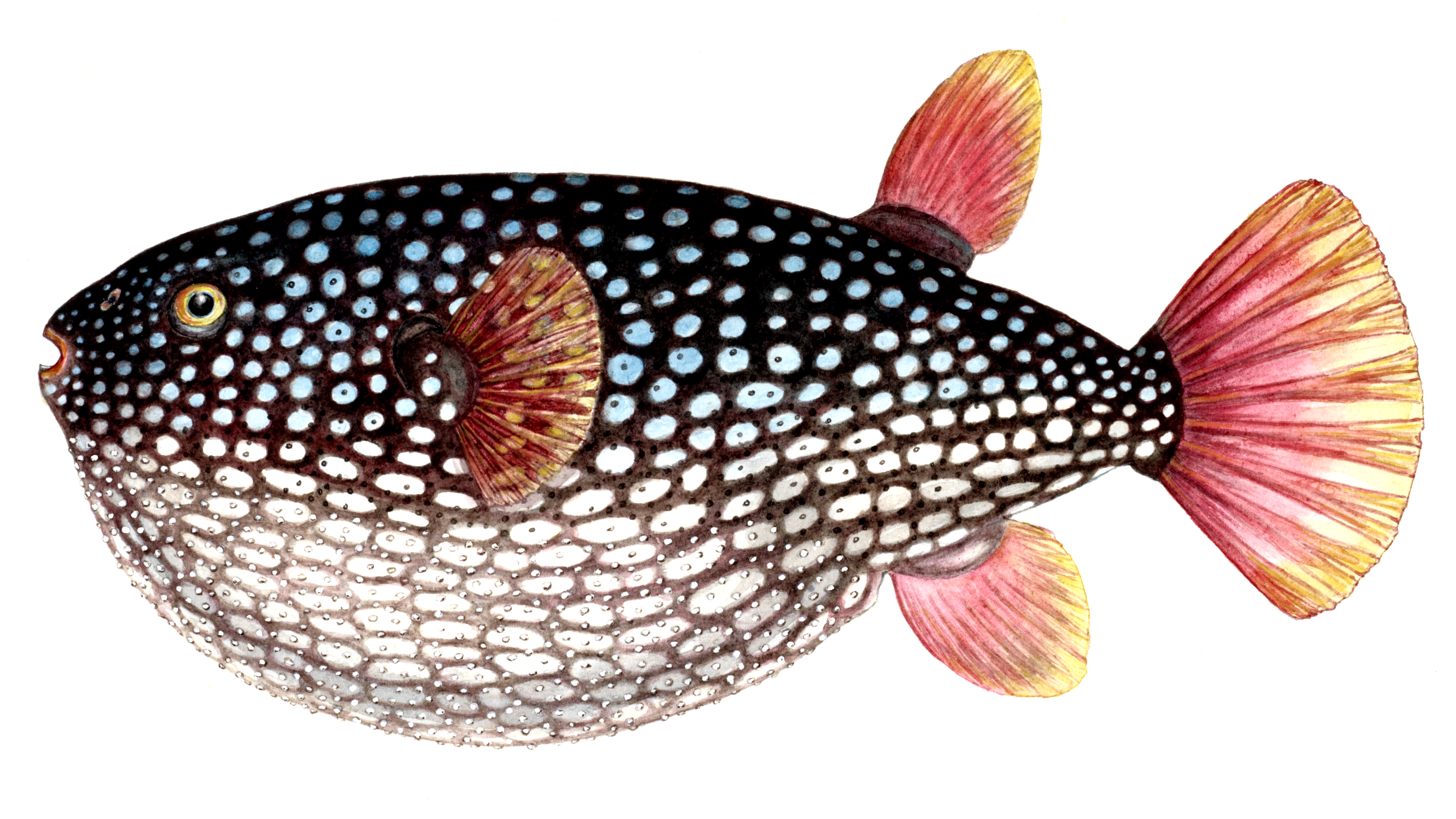

Scientific classification
- Kingdom: Animalia
- Phylum: Chordata
- Class: Actinopterygii
- Order: Tetraodontiformes
- Family: Tetraodontidae
- Genus: Arothron
- Species: A. gillbanksii

Binomial name
- Arothron gillbanksii (Clarke, 1897)

Synonyms
- Arothron gillbanksi; Tetraodon gillbanksii; Tetrodon gillbanksii

= Arothron gillbanksii =

Species of fish

Arothron gillbanksii is a species of pufferfish in the family Tetraodontidae. It is a temperate marine species native to New Zealand, although it is of uncertain classification and may belong to a genus other than Arothron.
