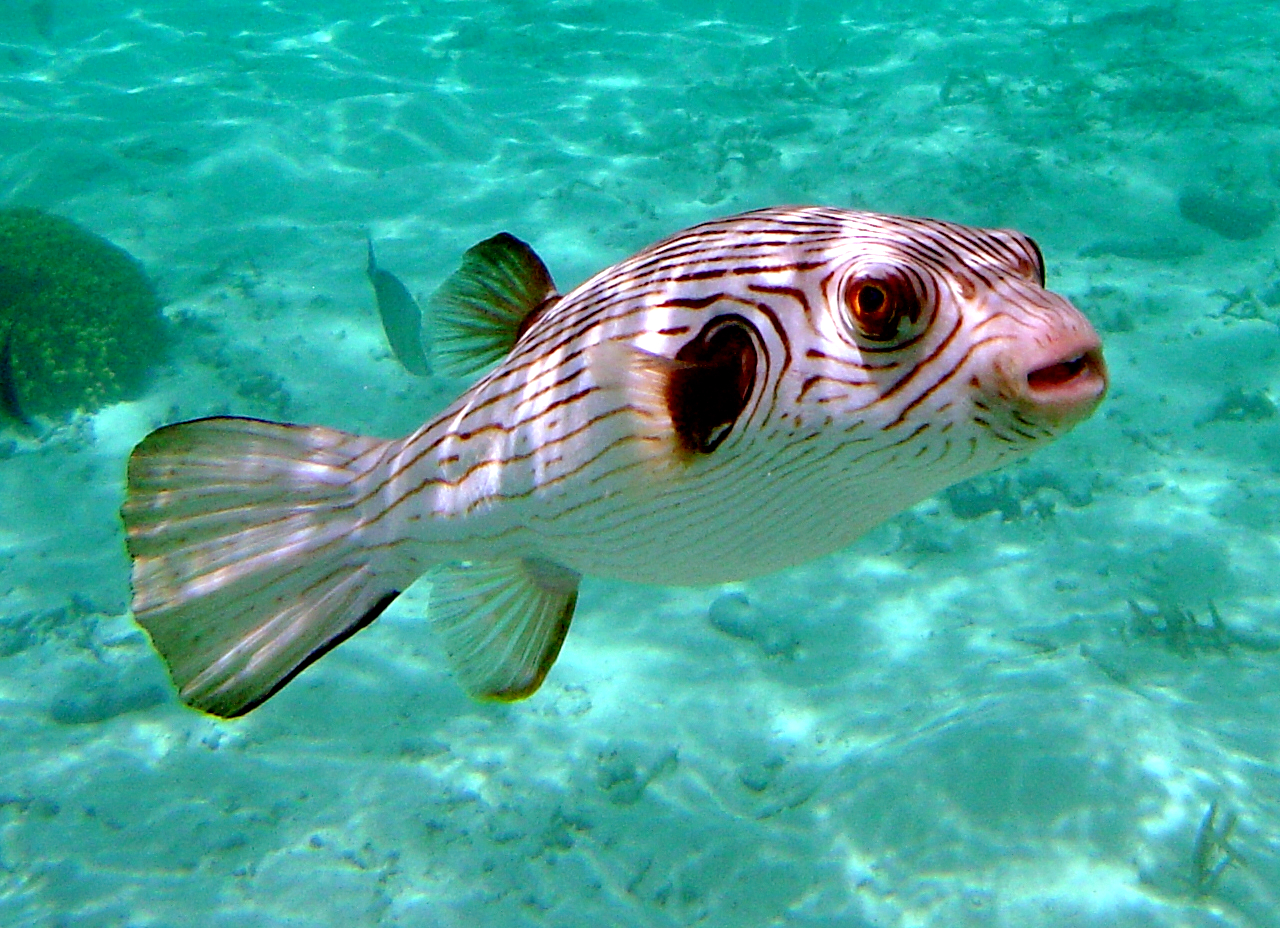
- At Guam

Conservation status
- Least Concern (IUCN 3.1)

Scientific classification
- Kingdom: Animalia
- Phylum: Chordata
- Class: Actinopterygii
- Division: Teleostei
- Order: Tetraodontiformes
- Family: Tetraodontidae
- Genus: Arothron
- Species: A. manilensis

Binomial name
- Arothron manilensis (Marion de Procé, 1822)

= Narrow-lined puffer =

Species of fish

The narrow-lined pufferfish (Arothron manilensis) or striped puffer is a demersal marine fish belonging to the family Tetraodontidae. It is found in tropical waters of the central Indo-Pacific.

== Habitat ==
It lives in estuaries, on the sheltered top reef or lagoons from the surface to 20 m depth. It is common in seagrass beds and sandy areas. Juveniles grow among mangroves.

== Description ==
Showing caudal fin, in Indonesia

Arothron manilensis grows up to 31 cm length. Its body is oval shape, spherical and relatively elongated. The skin is not covered with scales. The fish has no pelvic fin and no lateral line. The dorsal fin and the anal fin are small, symmetric and located at the end of the body. Its snout is short with two pairs of nostrils and its mouth is terminal with four strong teeth.

The background coloration is whitish to grey with brown horizontal lines, all the fins are yellowish and semi-translucide except the caudal fin which is opaque and outlined with black. Black blotch more or less circular at the base of the pectoral fin. The iris is also yellowish

== Biology ==
Schooling, in the Philippines

Arothron manilensis feeds on benthic invertebrates.

This pufferfish is diurnal, it is also a solitary animal.

== Gallery ==
Juvenile, in Indonesia

In Indonesia

In the Philippines

In Western Australia

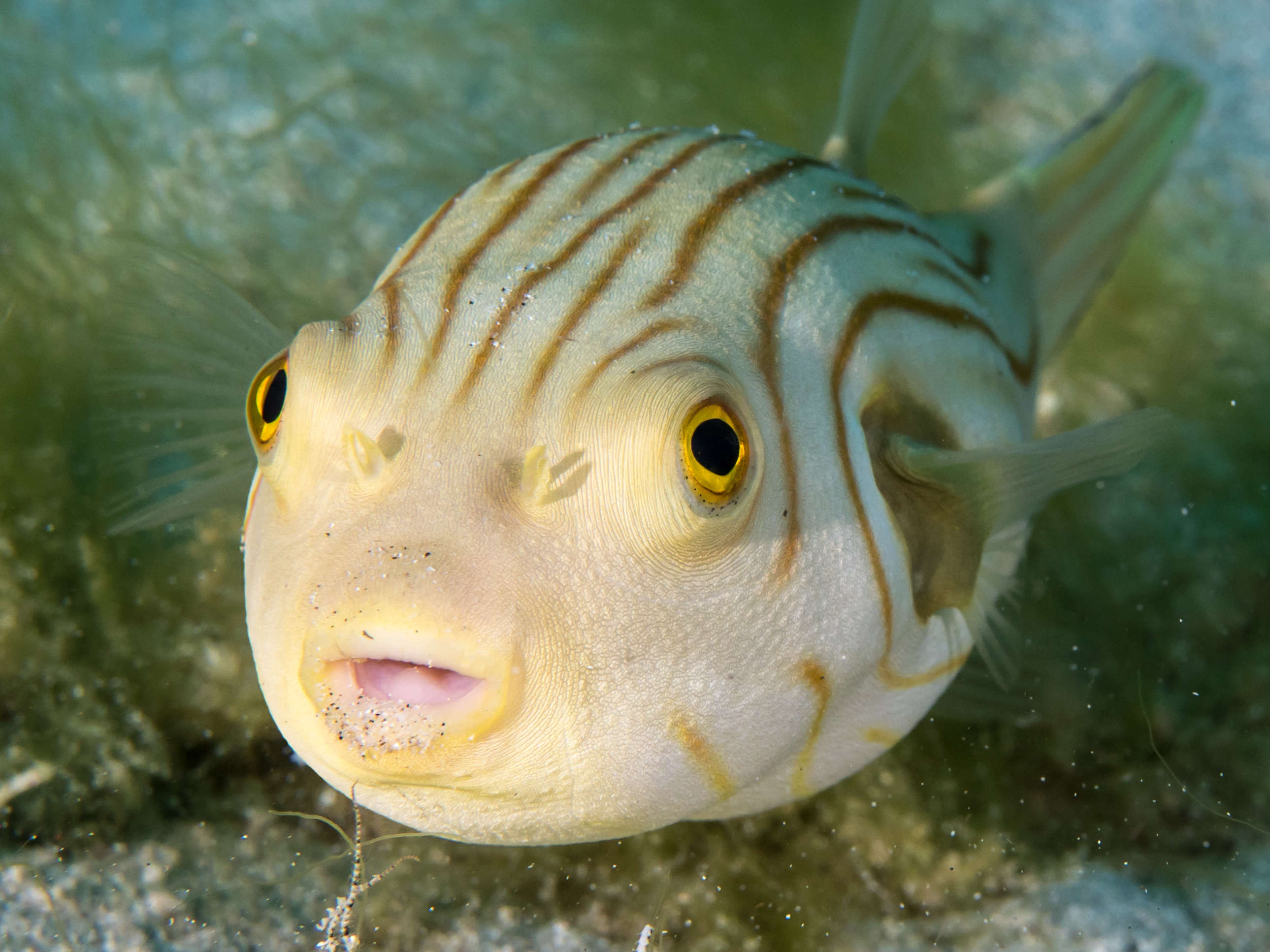
Closeup

Breathing
