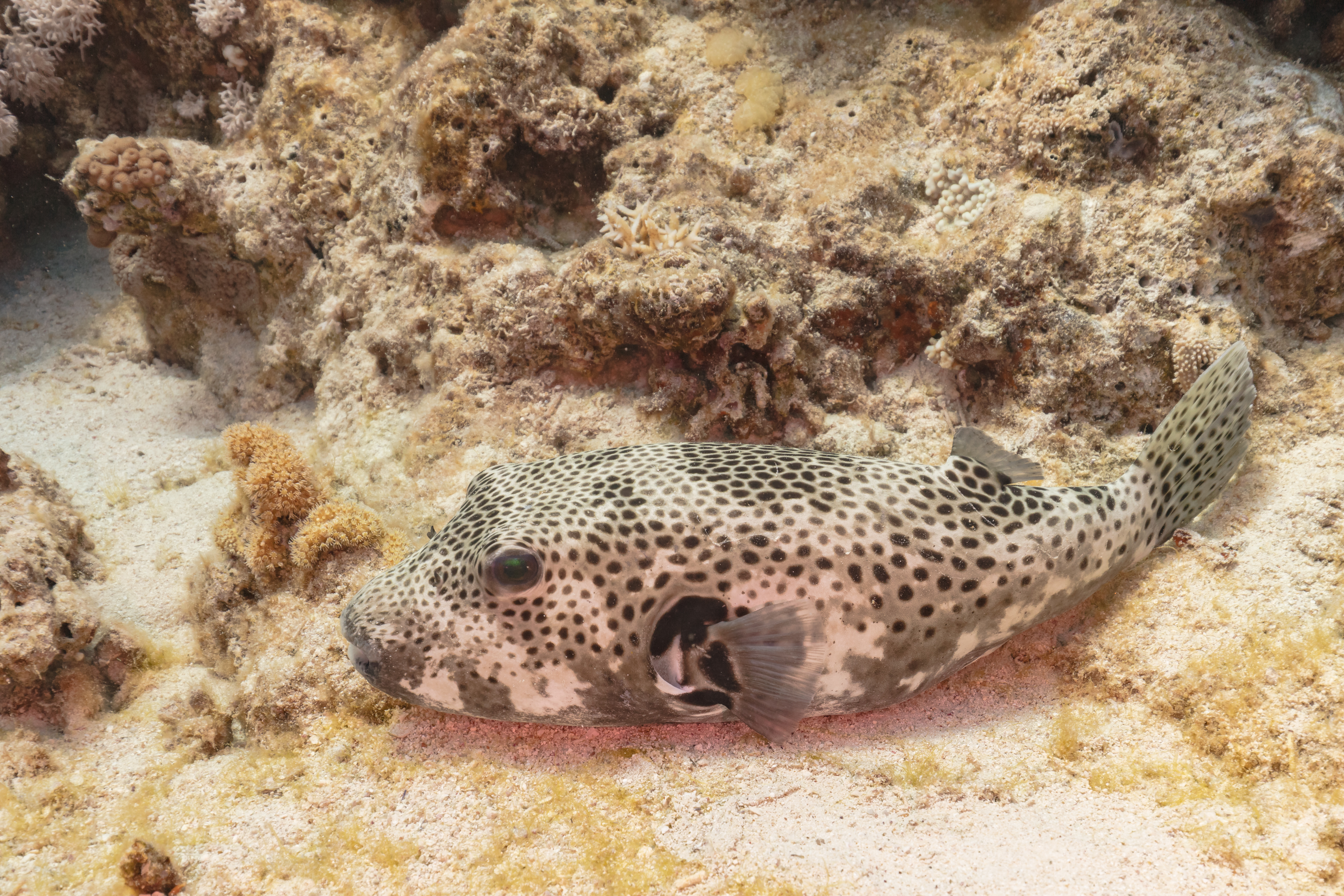

Conservation status
- Least Concern (IUCN 3.1)

Scientific classification
- Kingdom: Animalia
- Phylum: Chordata
- Class: Actinopterygii
- Division: Teleostei
- Order: Tetraodontiformes
- Family: Tetraodontidae
- Genus: Arothron
- Species: A. stellatus

Binomial name
- Arothron stellatus (Anonymous in Lacépède, 1798)

Synonyms
- Synonymy: Arothron aerostaticus (Jenyns, 1842); Arothron alboreticulatus (Tanaka, 1908); Arothron stellatus (Bloch & Schneider, 1801); Chelonodon stellaris (Bloch & Schneider, 1801) (misspelling); Diodon asper Cuvier, 1818; Kanduka michiei Hora, 1925; Takifugu stellatus (Bloch & Schneider, 1801); Tetraodon aerostaticus Jenyns, 1842; Tetraodon aerostatious Jenyns, 1842 (misspelling); Tetraodon alboreticulatus Tanaka, 1908; Tetraodon calamara Rüppell, 1829; Tetraodon lagocephalus var. stellatus Bloch & Schneider, 1801; Tetraodon punctatus Bloch & Schneider, 1801; Tetraodon stellatus Bloch & Schneider, 1801; Tetraodon stellatus Anonymous, 1798; Tetraodon stellatus Shaw, 1804; Tetrodon aerostaticus Jenyns, 1842 (misspelling); Tetrodon lagocephalus stellatus Bloch & Schneider, 1801 (misspelling); Tetrodon lagocephalus var. stellatus Bloch & Schneider, 1801 (misspelling); Tetrodon punctatus Bloch & Schneider, 1801 (misspelling); Tetrodon stellatus Bloch & Schneider, 1801 (misspelling); Tetrodon stellatus Shaw, 1804 (misspelling); Tetrodon stellatus Anonymous, 1798 (misspelling)

= Arothron stellatus =

Species of fish

Arothron stellatus, also known as the stellate pufferfish, starry puffer, or starry toadfish, is a demersal marine fish belonging to the family Tetraodontidae. It is found in shallow water in the Indo-Pacific region.

== Distribution and habitat ==
This species is found in tropical and subtropical waters from the Indian Ocean and Red Sea as far as Polynesia, southern Japan, the western, northern, and eastern coasts of Australia, and Lord Howe Island. It is a relatively uncommon species and lives close to external reef slopes and sheltered lagoons with clear water, but mainly in close proximity to sandy areas, at depths from the surface down to about 58 m (190 ft).

== Description ==
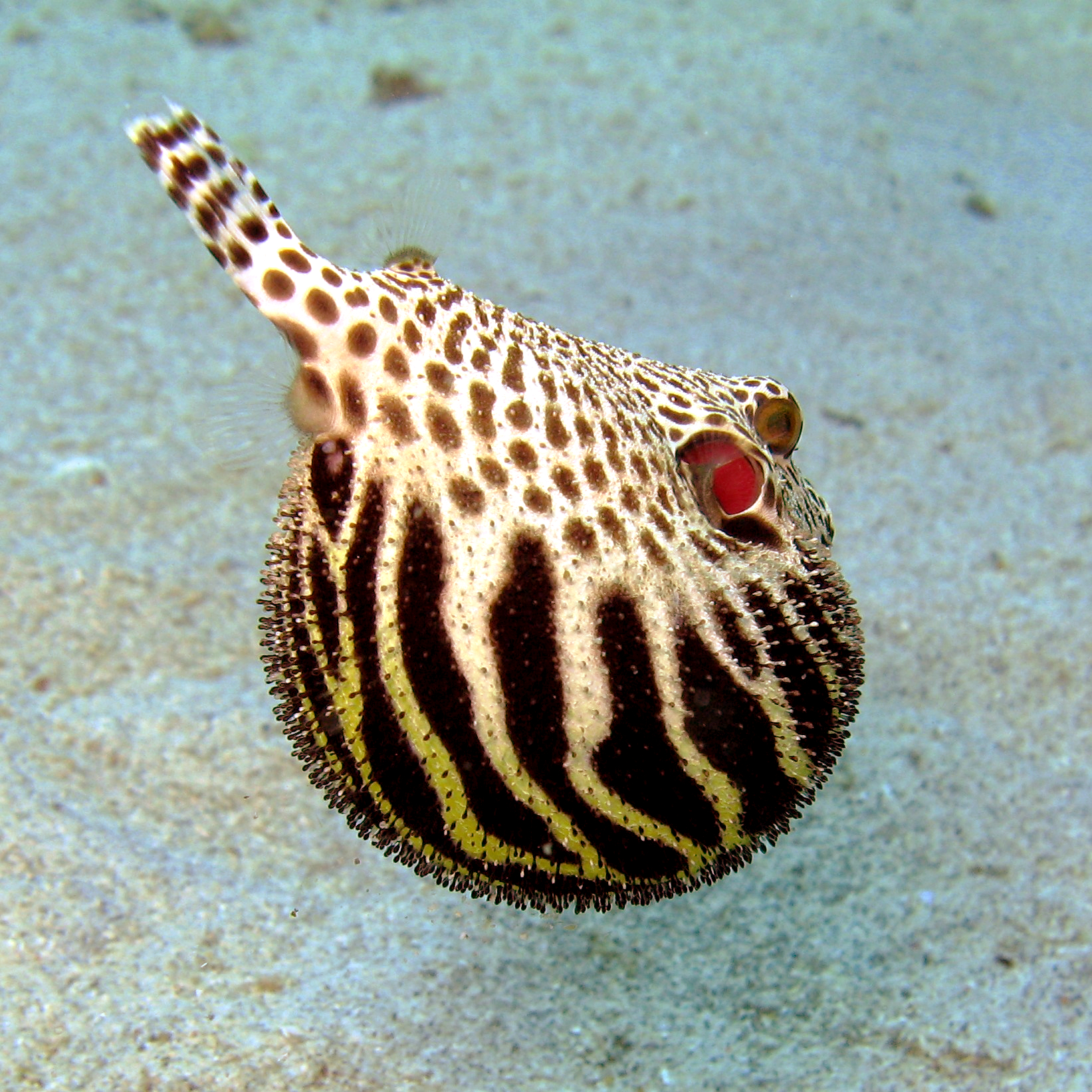
Immature fish, Mactan

Arothron stellatus is a very large pufferfish that grows up to 120 cm (47 in) in length. Its body is oval shaped, spherical and relatively elongated. The skin is not covered with scales but is prickly. The fish has no pelvic fin and no lateral line. The dorsal fin and the anal fin are small, symmetric, and located at the rear end of the body. The head is large with a short snout that has two pairs of nostrils, and the mouth is terminal with four strong teeth.

The background coloration goes from white to grey, and the body is harmoniously dotted with black spots. The ventral area is usually clearer. The size of the spots is inversely proportional to the size of the fish; thus, a young individual will have large spots and adults of maximal size will have small spots. The juveniles have a yellowish body background coloration with dark stripes. The young adults still have stripes on the ventral area that will turn to spots later, and also some recollection of yellow on the body.

== Behavior ==
Arothron stellatus feeds on benthic invertebrates, sponges, algae, the polyps of corals such as Acropora, crustaceans and mollusks.

This pufferfish is diurnal. It is mainly solitary and defends a territory.

To ward off potential enemies, they can inflate their bodies by swallowing air or water.

== Toxicity ==
Arothron stellatus contains a highly toxic poison, tetrodotoxin, in its ovaries and to a lesser extent its skin and liver, which protects it from voracious predators. It becomes toxic as it eats bacteria that contain the toxin.

== Gallery ==
In Taiwan

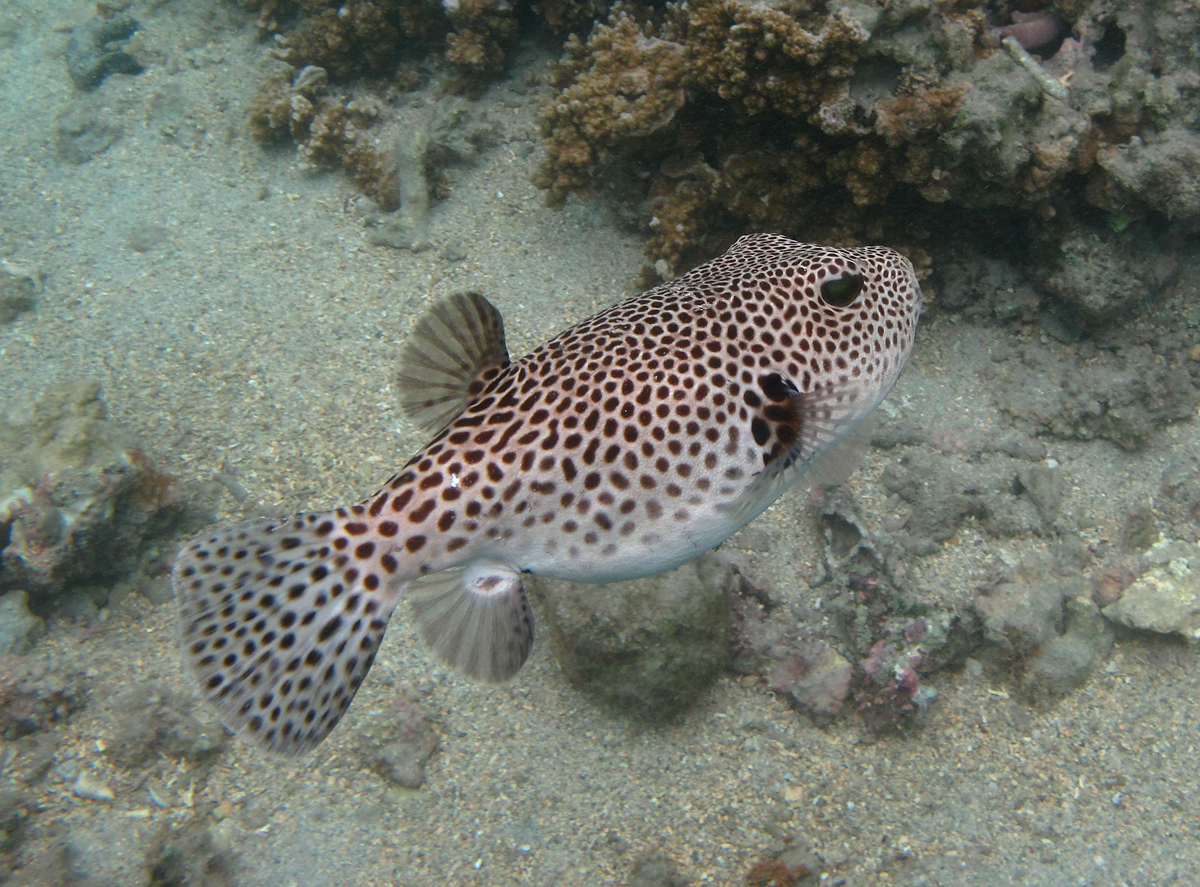
At Réunion

In the Red Sea
