= White-spotted puffer =

- In the Red Sea

Conservation status
- Least Concern (IUCN 3.1)

Scientific classification
- Kingdom: Animalia
- Phylum: Chordata
- Class: Actinopterygii
- Division: Teleostei
- Order: Tetraodontiformes
- Family: Tetraodontidae
- Genus: Arothron
- Species: A. hispidus

Binomial name
- Arothron hispidus (Linnaeus, 1758)

Synonyms
- Tetraodon implutus Jenyns, 1842

Species of fish

The white-spotted puffer fish (Arothron hispidus) is a medium to large-sized puffer fish, it can reach 50 cm length.

== Distribution ==
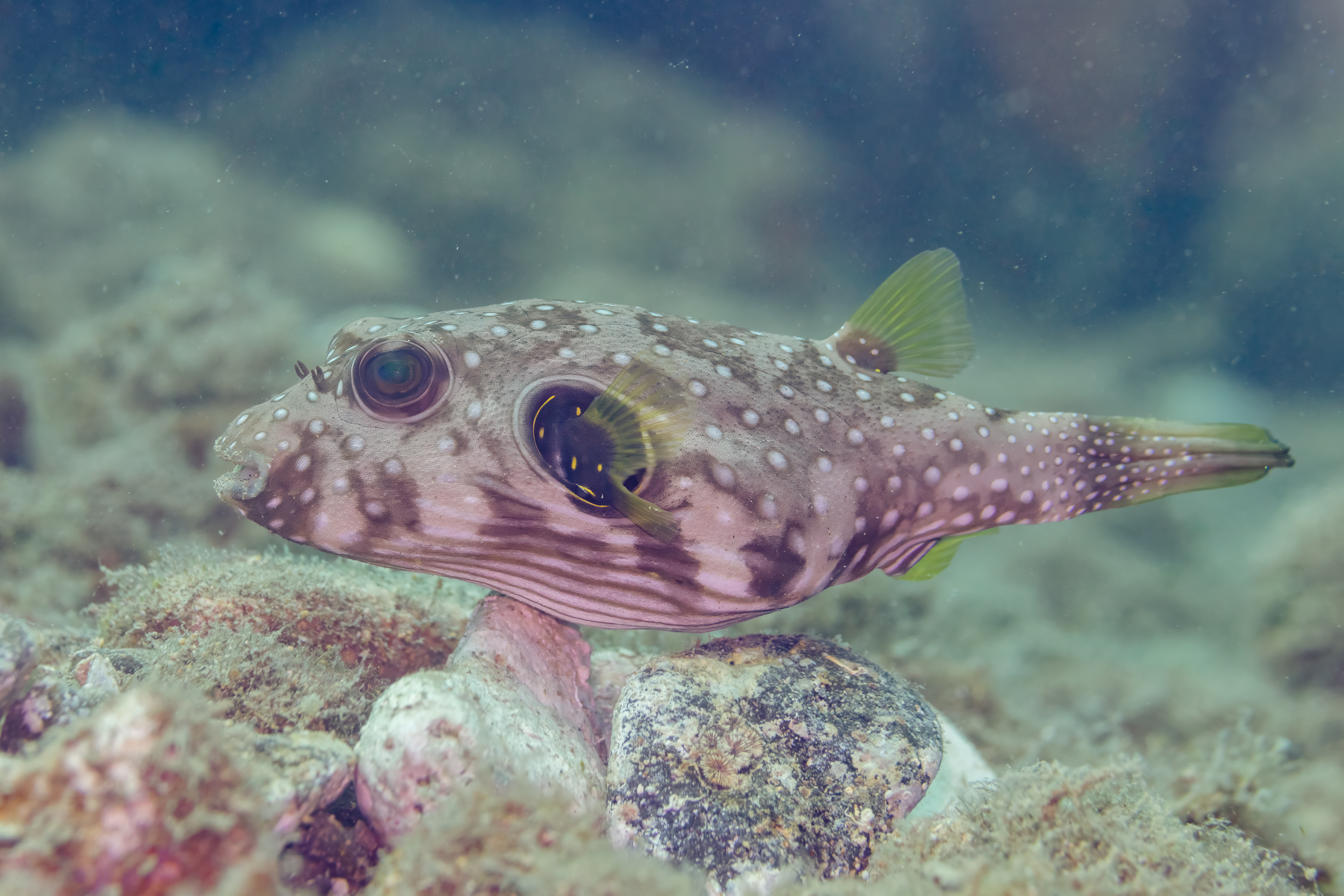
In the Philippines

Its distribution extends through the Indo-Pacific area, Red Sea included, to the eastern Pacific Ocean.

A confirmed record was reported recently from the eastern Mediterranean Sea off Cyprus. This individual found in the Mediterranean in 2018 is assumed to be juvenile because of its incomplete white ring-forming circles around its eyes; adults are said to display many white rings around the eyes, signifying the subadult status of this individual.

== Description ==
In captivity

It is light grey in color, or greyish or yellowish, and covered with more or less regular white points, that become concentric contrasting white and dark grey lines that radiate around the eyes and pectoral fins. The ventral part is white. The "shoulder" (around the pectoral fins) is dark. It also has concentric contrasting white and dark grey lines that radiate around the eyes and pectoral fins. The white spotted puffer fish is poisonous.

== Ecology ==
In the Red Sea

It can be found at depths of three to 35 metres. Its habitat types include reefs, lagoons, estuaries, and tidepools. Its diet includes calcareous or coralline algae, molluscs, tunicates, sponges, corals, zoanthids, crabs, polychaetes, starfish, urchins, krill, and silversides.

The adult is nocturnal and solitary. It is territorial, becoming somewhat aggressive.

== Gallery ==
In captivity

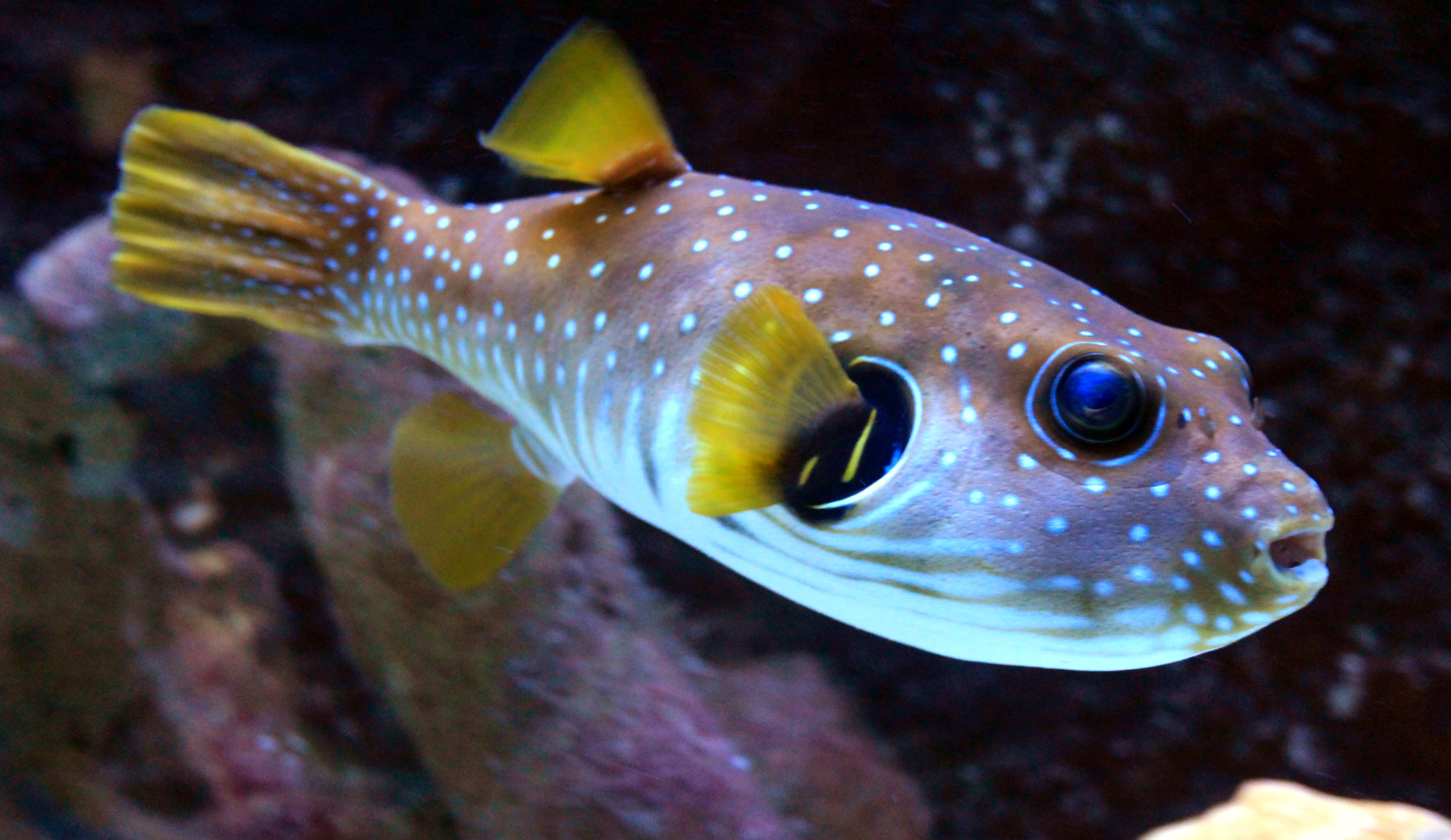
