= ACEN =

ACEN may refer to:

- ACEN Corporation, energy firm in the Philippines under the Ayala Corporation
- Assembly of Captive European Nations, defunct organization for nations in the Soviet Bloc
- Accreditation Commission for Education in Nursing, an educational accrediting body
- Anime Central, an annual anime convention
