= Burgos, Ilocos Norte =

Municipality in Ilocos Norte, Philippines

Burgos Nagpartian
- Municipality
- Municipality of Burgos
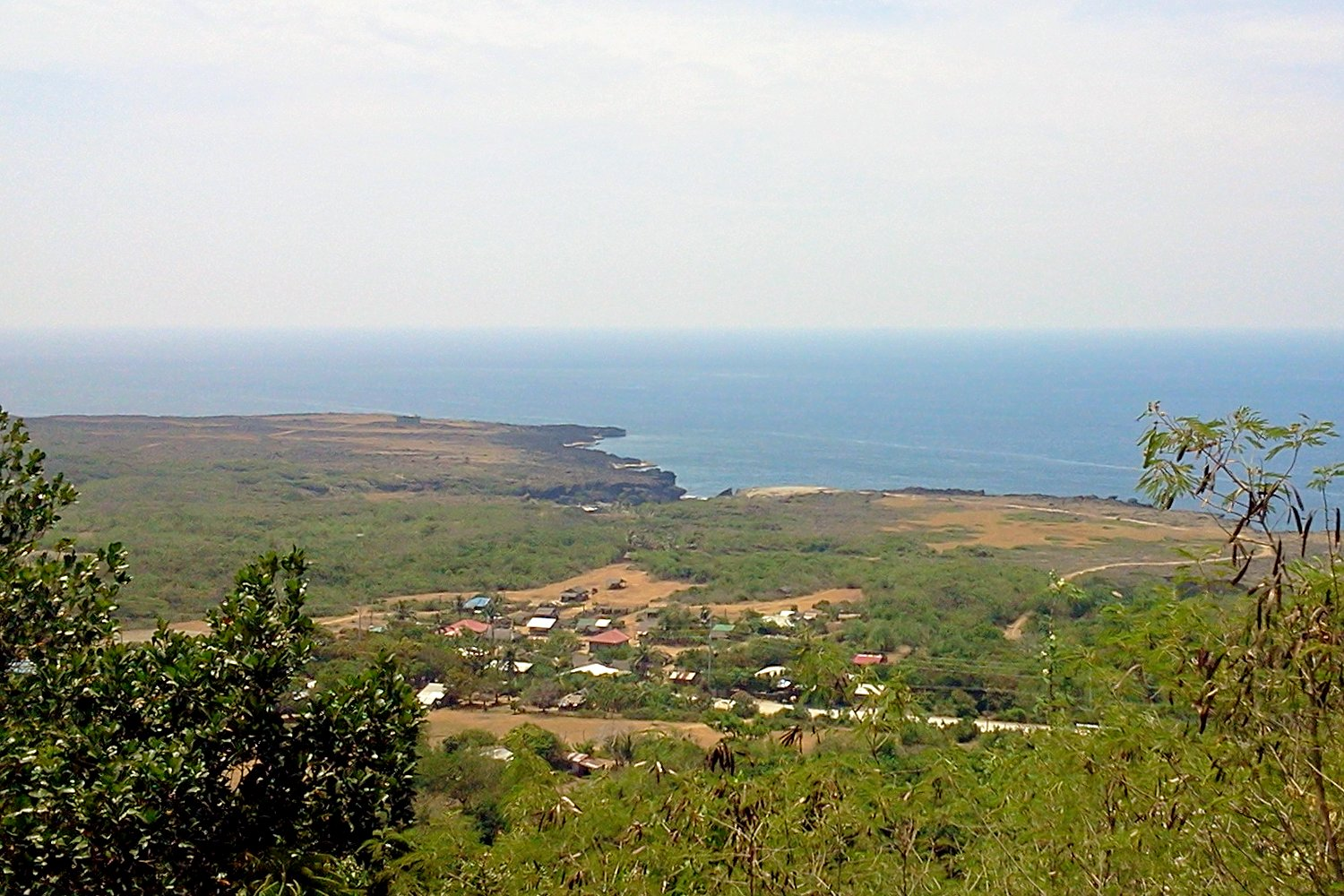
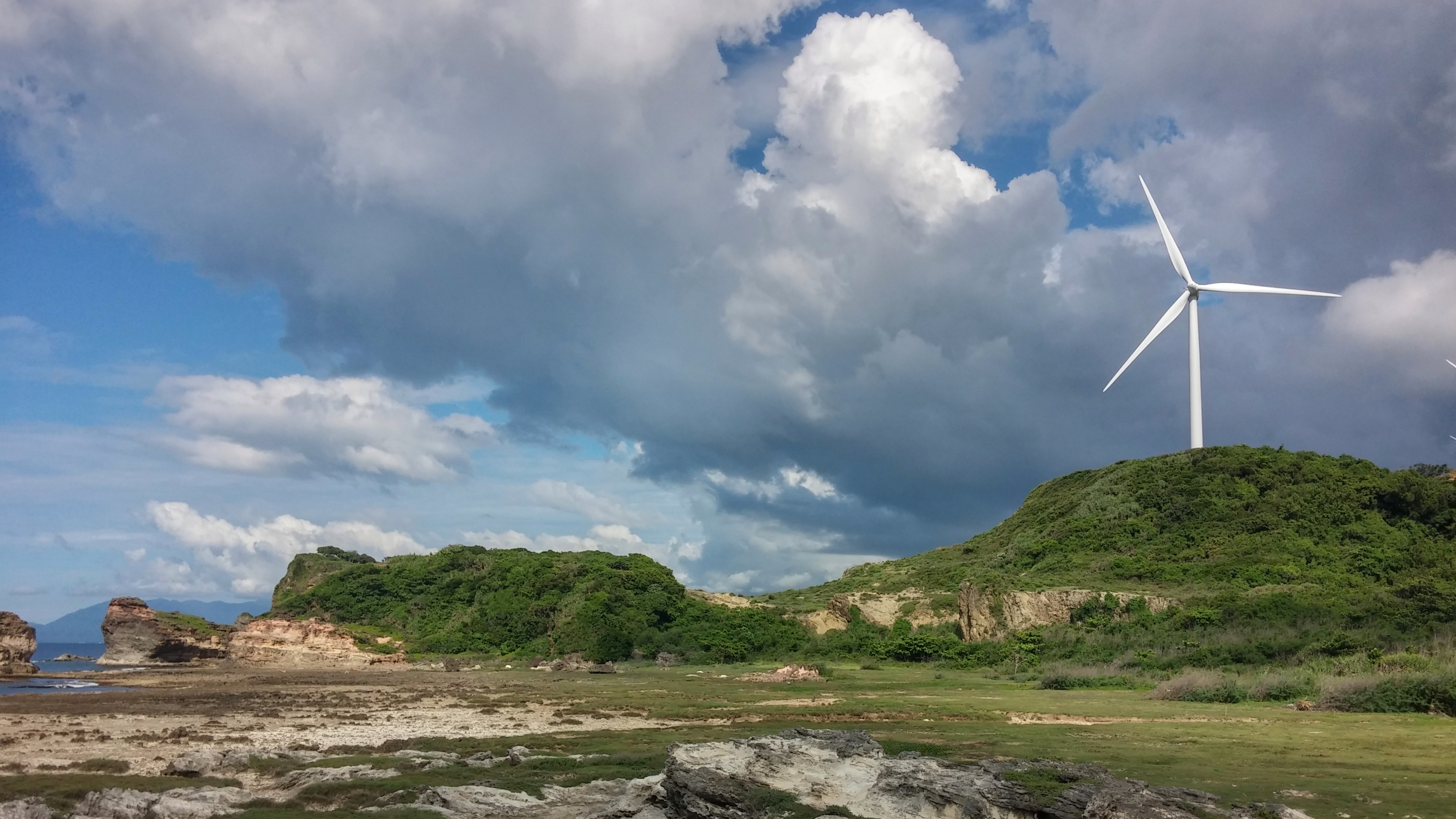
- Aerial view Kapurpurawan Rock Formation Cape Bojeador Lighthouse

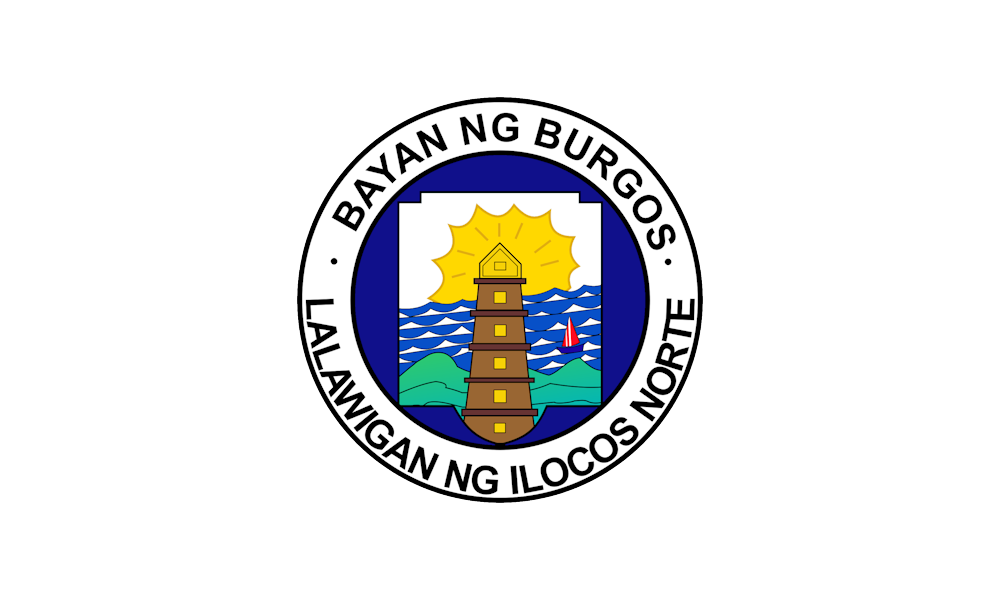
- Flag Seal

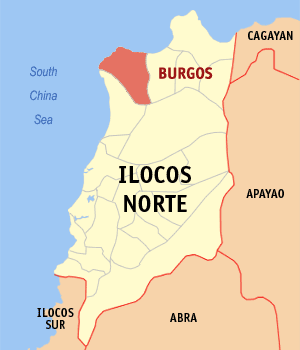
- Map of Ilocos Norte with Burgos highlighted
- Interactive map of Burgos
- Location within the Philippines
- Coordinates: 18°30′41″N 120°38′40″E
- Country: Philippines
- Region: Ilocos Region
- Province: Ilocos Norte
- District: 1st district
- Annexation to Bangui: October 15, 1903
- Chartered: January 1, 1913
- Renamed: February 28, 1914 (as Burgos)
- Named for: José Burgos
- Barangays: 11 (see Barangays)

Government
  - Type: Sangguniang Bayan
  - Mayor: Crescente N. Garcia
  - Vice Mayor: Rodolfo L. Garcia
  - Representative: Ferdinand Alexander Araneta Marcos III
  - Municipal Council: Members: Jelson G. Espejo; Susan G. Santiago; Raponsel G. Jimenez; Florentino A. Campañano; Kervin G. Guinto; Rodel T. Dalo; Efren A. Saguiguit; Aristedes M. Pante
  - Electorate: 8,114 voters (2025)

Area
  - Total: 128.90 km^{2} (49.77 sq mi)
- Elevation: 88 m (289 ft)
- Highest elevation: 293 m (961 ft)
- Lowest elevation: 0 m (0 ft)

Population (2024 census)
  - Total: 10,962
  - Density: 85.043/km^{2} (220.26/sq mi)
  - Households: 2,832

Economy
  - Income class: 3rd municipal income class
  - Poverty incidence: 3.59% (2023)
  - Revenue: ₱ 227.2 million (2024)
  - Assets: ₱ 984.3 million (2024)
  - Expenditure: ₱ 161.6 million (2024)
  - Liabilities: ₱ 357.1 million (2024)

Service provider
  - Electricity: Ilocos Norte Electric Cooperative (INEC)
- Time zone: UTC+8 (PST)
- ZIP code: 2918
- PSGC: 0102806000
- IDD : area code: +63 (0)77
- Native languages: Ilocano; Tagalog
- Website: www.burgosilocosnorte.gov.ph

Burgos, officially the Municipality of Burgos (Ilocano: Ili ti Burgos; Tagalog: Bayan ng Burgos), is a municipality in the province of Ilocos Norte, Philippines. According to the 2024 census, it has a population of 10,962 people.

It is home of the century-old Cape Bojeador Lighthouse.

== Etymology ==
The town was formerly known as Nagpartian and was renamed after the martyred priest José Burgos who was born in the Ilocos Region.

== History ==
The town was first known as Nagparitan, the early inhabitants were called Mumburi and known as a wild and fierce people who prevented the Christianized natives from settling in the vicinity. When the Spaniards came to the area, the people staged a revolt, killed the priest, and mutilated his body. Because of this incident, the Spaniards changed the name of Nagparitan, meaning prohibit, to Nagpartian which means the place of slaughter.

On October 15, 1903, Nagpartian was then fused with the municipality of Bangui due to low collection of government taxes. In 1912, Executive Order No. 87 was issued to separate Nagpartian from Bangui; the change took effect on January 1, 1913. On February 28, 1914, by virtue of Act No. 2390, Nagpartian was renamed Burgos in honor of one of the three martyred priests, Fr. José Burgos. Juan Ignacio was the first Presidente Municipal of the town.

== Geography ==
Burgos Wind Farm

Burgos is bounded to the north by the South China Sea; Bangui in the east and in the south, Pasuquin and Vintar. It has a total land area of 49.77 square miles (128.9 km^{2}). It is situated in the north coast of Ilocos Norte. Burgos has the largest wind farm in the Philippines.

Burgos is situated 534.18 kilometers (331.92 mi) from the country's capital city of Manila, and 48.67 kilometers (30.24 mi) from Laoag City, the provincial capital.

=== Barangays ===
Burgos is politically subdivided into 11 barangays. Each barangay consists of puroks and some have sitios.

- Ablan Sarat (Buraan)
- Agaga
- Bayog
- Bobon
- Buduan (Malituek)
- Nagsurot
- Paayas
- Pagali
- Poblacion (Ili)
- Saoit
- Tanap

=== Climate ===
Climate data for Burgos, Ilocos Norte
Month	Jan	Feb	Mar	Apr	May	Jun	Jul	Aug	Sep	Oct	Nov	Dec	Year
Mean daily maximum °C (°F)	26 (79)	28 (82)	30 (86)	32 (90)	31 (88)	31 (88)	30 (86)	30 (86)	29 (84)	29 (84)	28 (82)	26 (79)	29 (85)
Mean daily minimum °C (°F)	19 (66)	20 (68)	21 (70)	23 (73)	24 (75)	25 (77)	25 (77)	25 (77)	24 (75)	23 (73)	22 (72)	21 (70)	23 (73)
Average precipitation mm (inches)	55 (2.2)	41 (1.6)	37 (1.5)	41 (1.6)	184 (7.2)	215 (8.5)	261 (10.3)	256 (10.1)	245 (9.6)	216 (8.5)	142 (5.6)	129 (5.1)	1,822 (71.8)
Average rainy days	14.1	11.1	11.8	12.5	21.8	25.2	25.5	24.9	23.8	18.2	16.4	17.0	222.3
Source: Meteoblue

== Demographics ==
Population census of Burgos

Year	Pop.	±% p.a.
1903	2,142	—
1918	2,389	+0.73%
1939	2,882	+0.90%
1948	3,003	+0.46%
1960	3,984	+2.38%
1970	5,013	+2.32%
1975	5,274	+1.02%
1980	5,871	+2.17%

Year	Pop.	±% p.a.
1990	7,643	+2.67%
1995	8,227	+1.39%
2000	8,534	+0.79%
2007	8,765	+0.37%
2010	9,687	+3.71%
2015	9,777	+0.18%
2020	10,759	+2.03%
2024	10,962	+0.45%

Source: Philippine Statistics Authority

In the 2024 census, the population of Burgos was 10,962 people, with a density of 85 inhabitants per square kilometre or 220 inhabitants per square mile.

== Economy ==
Poverty incidence of Burgos (%)

Source: Philippine Statistics Authority

Agriculture and fishing remain as the primary livelihood sources of Burgos. Majority of the inhabitants of the municipality are engaged in the harvesting of crops such as rice, garlic, tomato, mung beans, and corn. Most of them also venture into fishing, livestock raising, rice milling, and cottage industries such as furniture and hollow-blocks making, smelting, salt-making, and mat weaving. The municipality is home to the Burgos Wind Farm.

== Government ==
=== Local government ===
Burgos, belonging to the first congressional district of the province of Ilocos Norte, is governed by a mayor designated as its local chief executive and by a municipal council as its legislative body in accordance with the Local Government Code. The mayor, vice mayor, and the councilors are elected directly by the people through an election which is being held every three years.

=== Elected officials ===
Members of the Municipal Council (2025–2028)
Position	Name
Congressman	Ferdinand Alexander A. Marcos III
Mayor	Crescente N. Garcia
Vice-Mayor	Russell Jenald N. Garcia
Councilors	Glenn Joy R. Gervacio
Councilors	Raponsel G. Jimenez
Councilors	Ma. Kathrina G. Saguiguit-Fulgar
Councilors	Vincent A. Garcia
Councilors	Randy R. Pagud
Councilors	Aristedes M. Pante
Councilors	Emmanuel Jackson A. Calapini
Councilors	Love Joy G. Campañano

=== Municipal seal ===

- Shield, derived from the Provincial Seal of Ilocos Norte.
- Lighthouse, represents the Cape Bojeador Lighthouse, the main tourist attraction in the town.
- Light, serves as guide to shipping vessels cruising the South China Sea.
- Mountain and Sea, depict the geographical location and the territorial limits of the municipality.

== Education ==
The Burgos Schools District Office governs all public and private elementary and high schools within the municipality.

=== Primary and elementary schools ===
- Ablan Community School
- Agaga Elementary School
- Bayog Elementary School
- Bliss Elementary School
- Bobon Elementary School
- Burgos Central Elementary School
- Nagsurot Elementary School
- Paayas Elementary School
- Saoit Elementary School
- Tanap-Avis Falls
  Kaangrian Falls
  Tanap Elementary School

=== Secondary school ===
- Burgos Agro-Industrial School

== Tourism ==
The town is endowed with natural tourist attractions – from plain white beaches in Barangays Paayas and Bobon, to rugged and sharp cliffs naturally formed through the centuries like Gagamtan Cliff in Barangay Bayog and Kapurpurawan Cliff in Barangay Saoit. The Kaangrian Falls in Barangay Agaga and the Digging Falls at the boundary of Barangays Ablan and Buduan are another pride of the town. Burgos is also home to the Tanap-Avis Falls, part of a watershed forest reserve under the National Integrated Protected Areas System (NIPAS) of the DENR-Protected Areas and Wildlife Bureau.

Another tourist attraction worth mentioning is the historic Cape Bojeador Lighthouse, built during the latter part of the 19th century. Facing the South China Sea, it serves as a beacon to passing ships and to local fishermen. Because of its high elevation, it offers travelers with a panoramic view of the rugged coastline of Burgos.

== See also ==
- List of renamed cities and municipalities in the Philippines
