= Kapurpurawan Rock Formation =

Rock formation in Ilocos Norte, Philippines

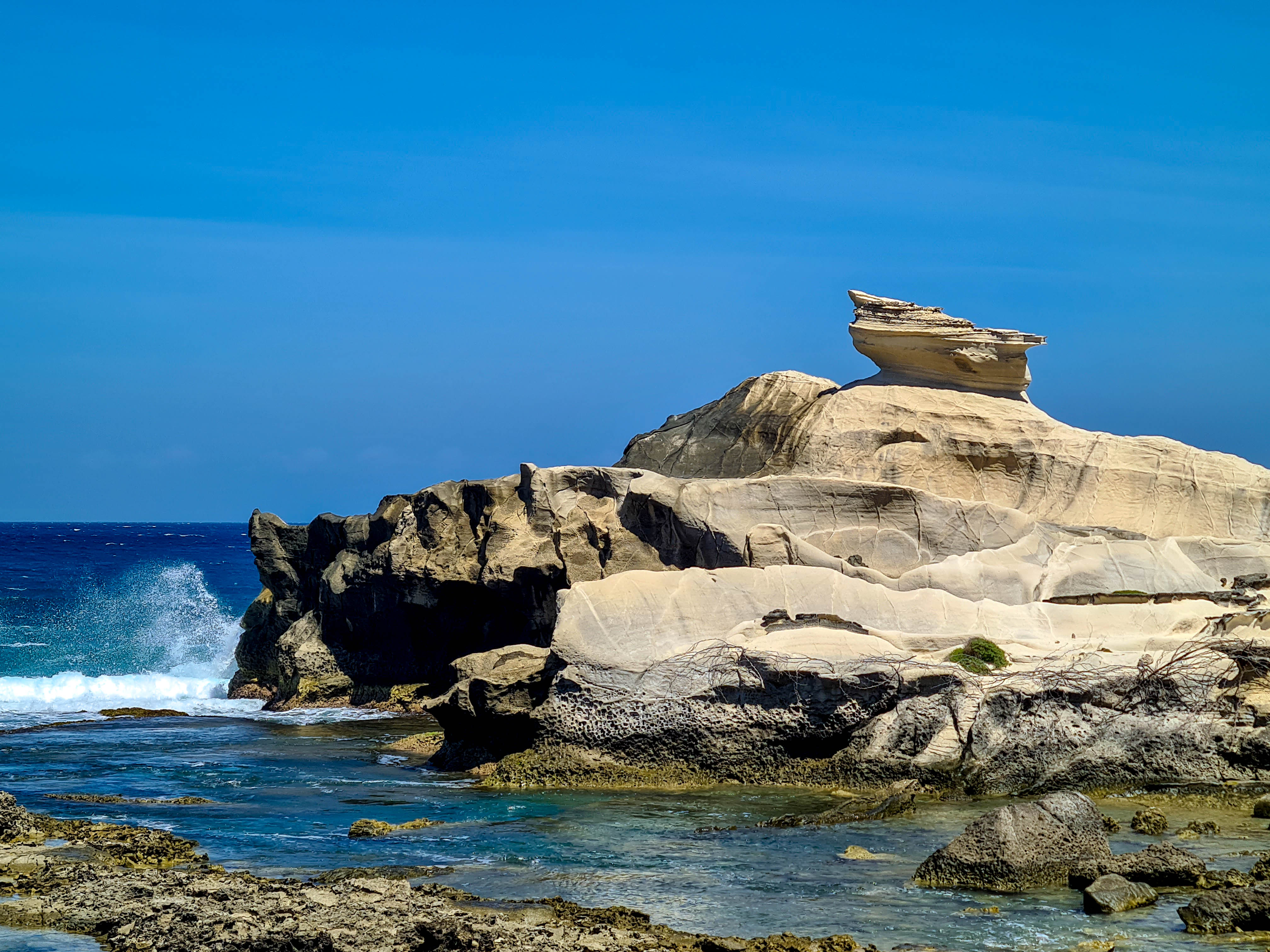

- Location within Luzon Location within Philippines

Geography
- Location: Burgos, Ilocos Norte
- Country: Philippines
- Coordinates: 18°32′19″N 120°39′13″E
- Interactive map of Kapurpurawan Rock Formation

Kapurpurawan Rock Formation is a natural rock formation in Burgos, Ilocos Norte, Philippines.

It is located on the northwestern tip of Burgos and is situated right next to another popular tourist attraction, Bangui Wind Farm.

It was named after the Ilocano word "puraw" which means "white”. In reference to the white limestone formations formed over time.

== Gallery ==
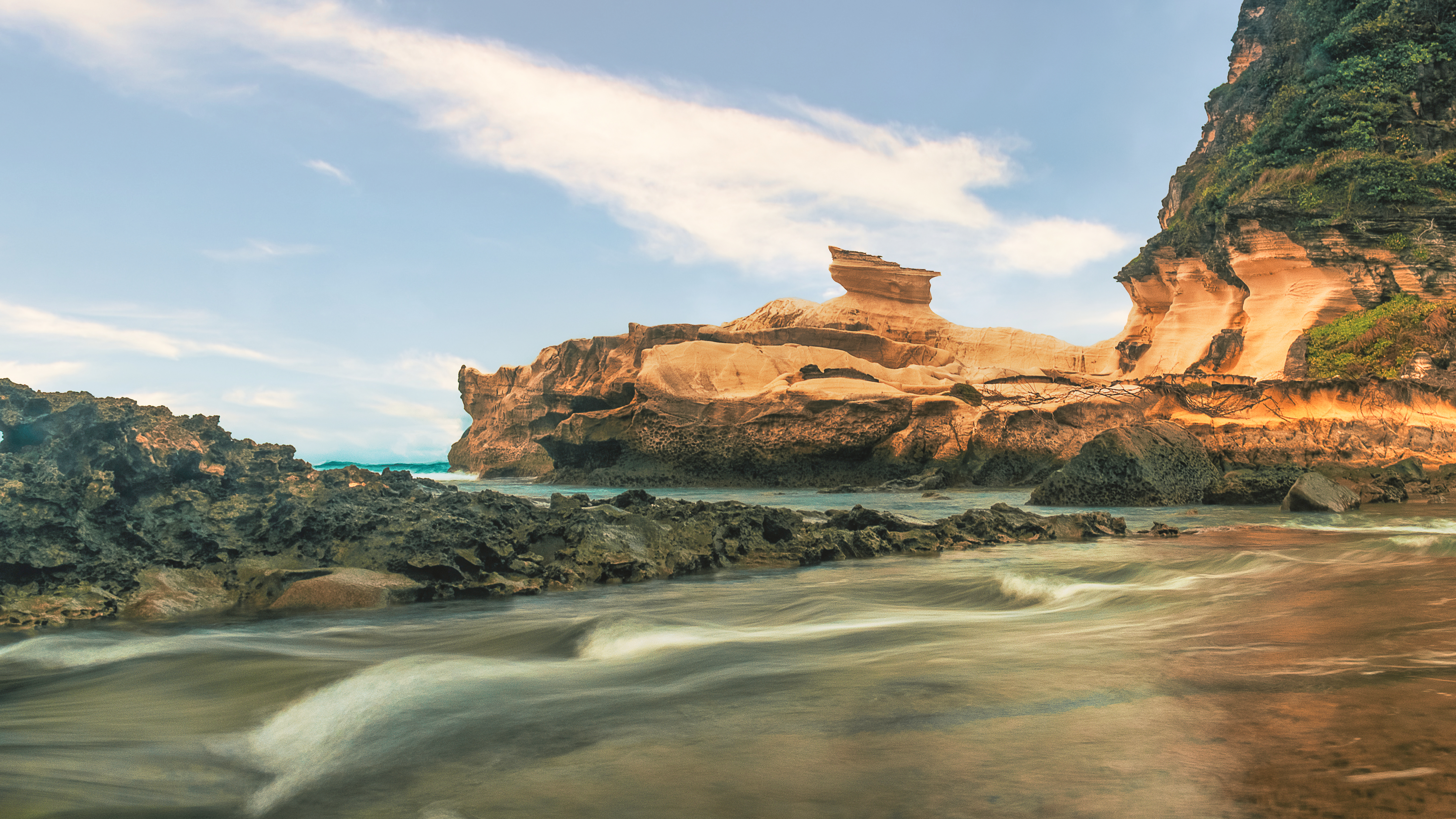
Kapurpurawan Rock Formation

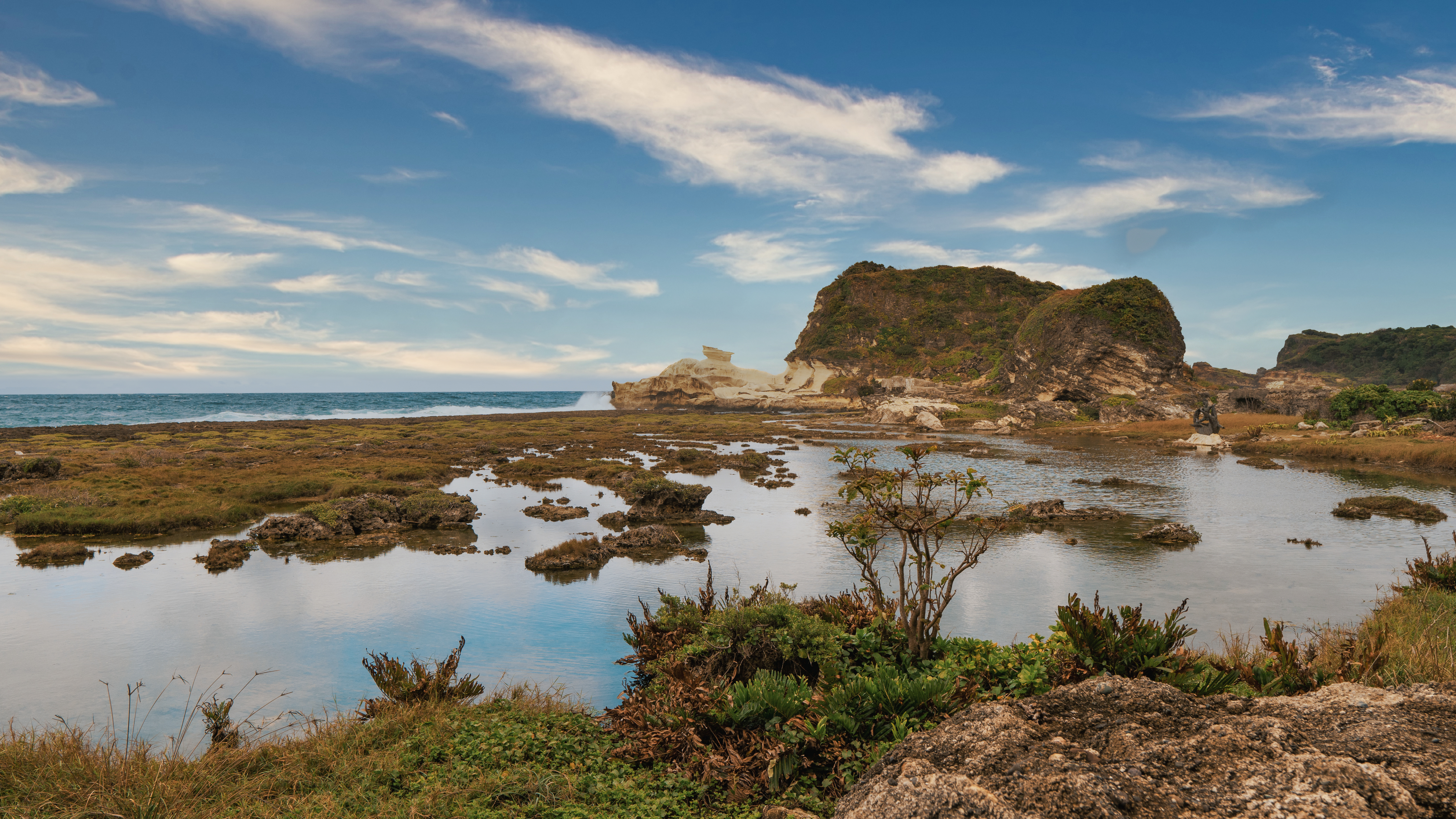
Kapurpurawan Rock Formation in the distance

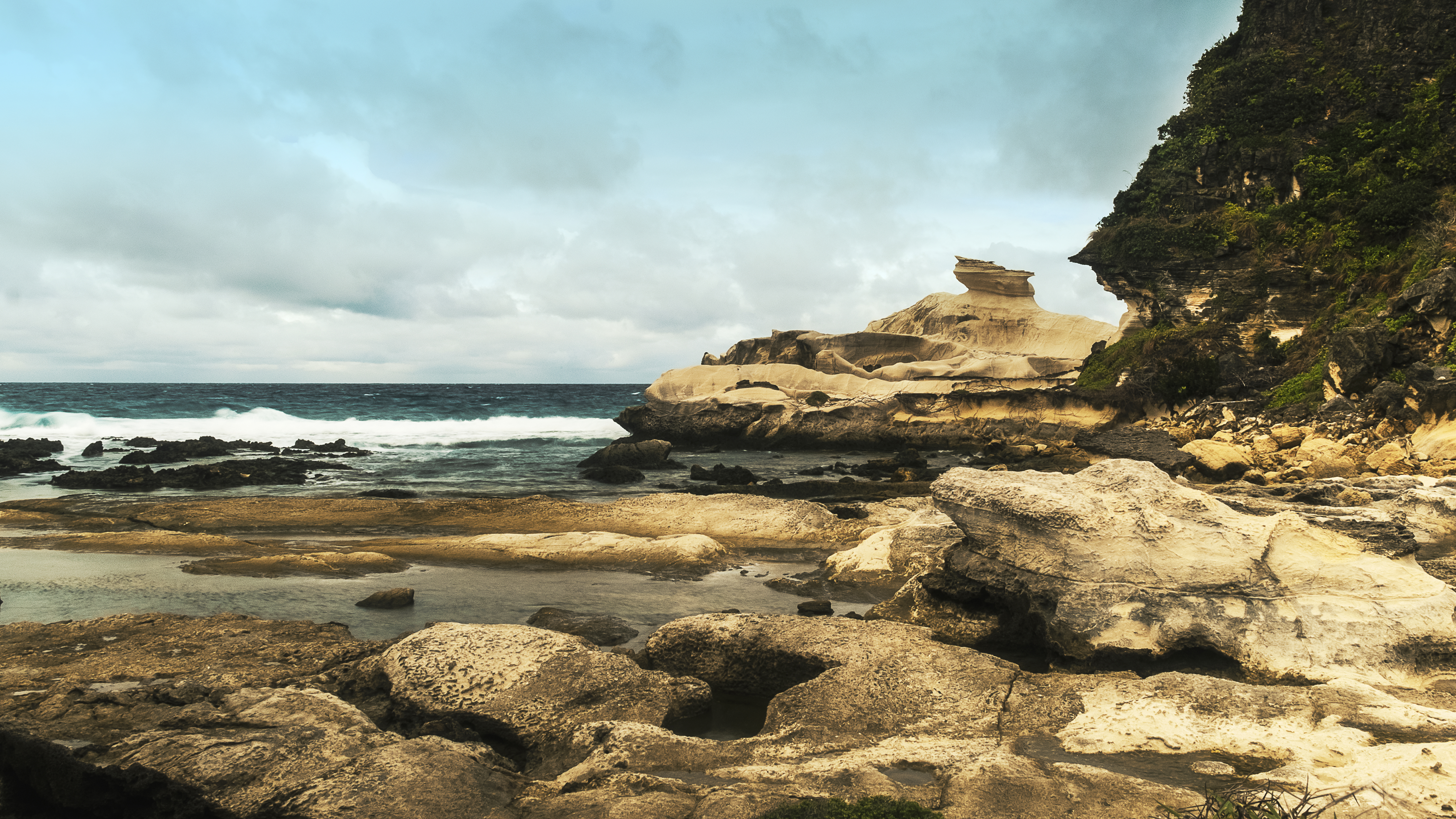
Waves crashing near Kapurpurawan Rock Formation
