= Bangui, Ilocos Norte =

Municipality in Ilocos Norte, Philippines

Bangui
- Municipality
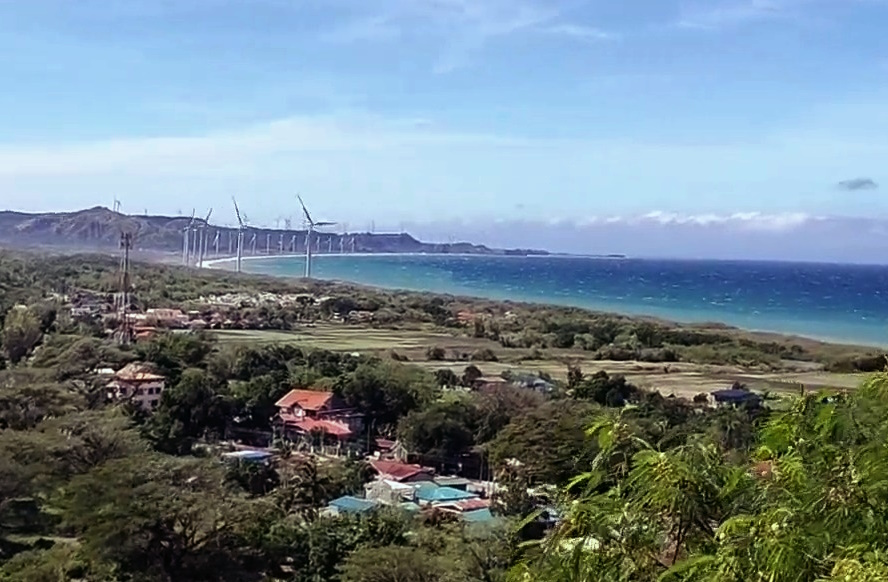
- View of Bangui from Sentinella Hill

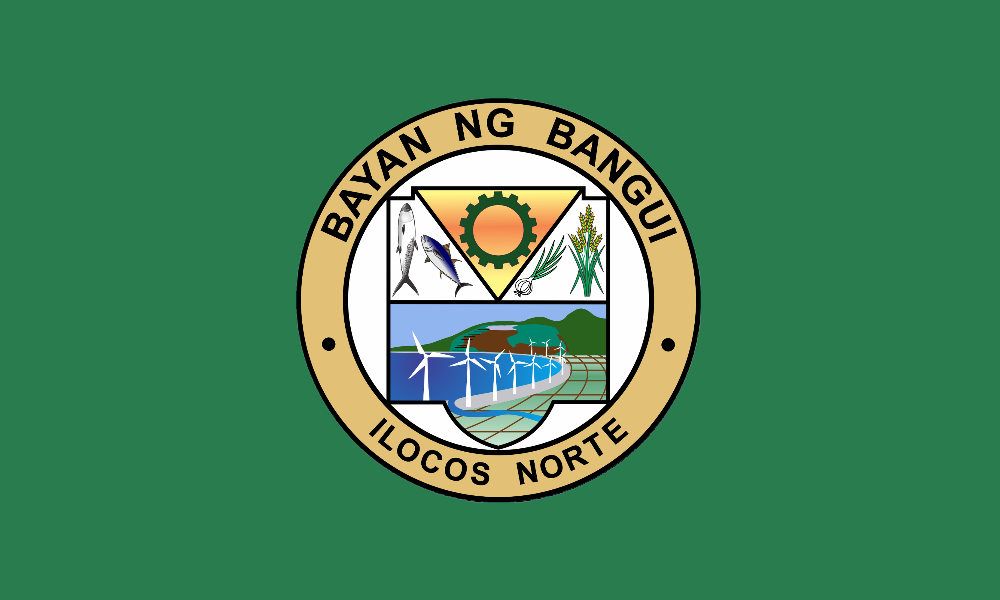
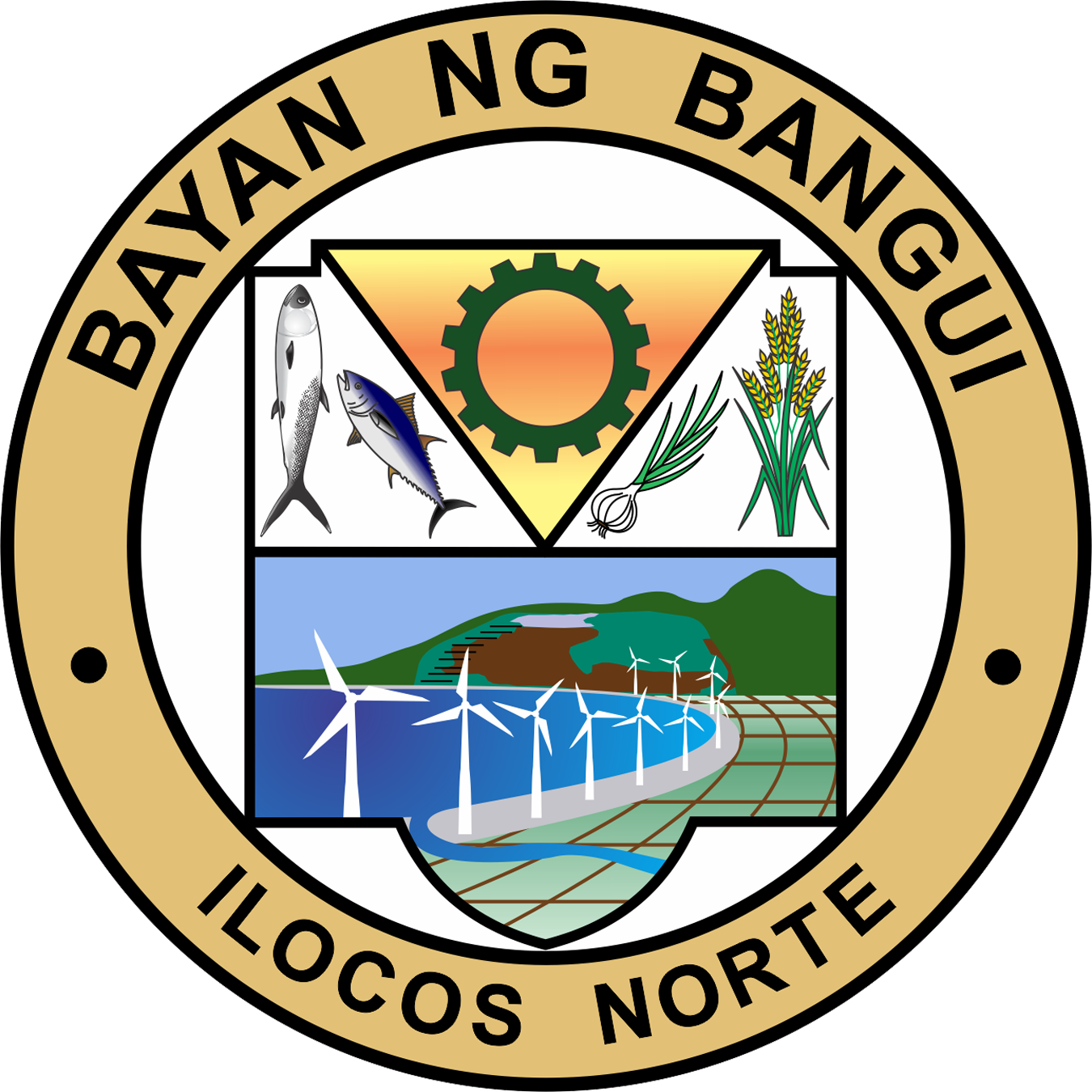
- Flag Seal

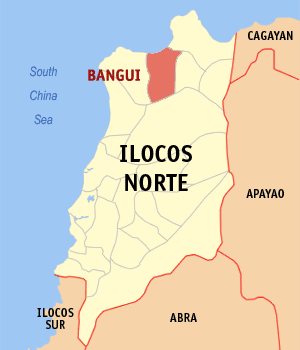
- Map of Ilocos Norte with Bangui highlighted
- Interactive map of Bangui
- Location within the Philippines
- Coordinates: 18°32′16″N 120°45′55″E
- Country: Philippines
- Region: Ilocos Region
- Province: Ilocos Norte
- District: 1st district
- Barangays: 14 (see Barangays)

Government
  - Type: Sangguniang Bayan
  - Mayor: Fidel A. Cimatu Jr.
  - Vice Mayor: Denton Lawrence G. Garvida
  - Representative: Ferdinand Alexander Araneta Marcos III
  - Municipal Council: Members: Joy R. Soriano; Florencio G. Sales Jr.; Diosdado I. Garvida; Doddie M. Gaces; Susan B. Faylogna; Rogerick C. Balbag; Anthony N. Campañano; Florante L. Garvida
  - Electorate: 11,403 voters (2025)

Area
  - Total: 112.98 km^{2} (43.62 sq mi)
- Elevation: 88 m (289 ft)
- Highest elevation: 902 m (2,959 ft)
- Lowest elevation: 0 m (0 ft)

Population (2024 census)
  - Total: 15,227
  - Density: 134.78/km^{2} (349.07/sq mi)
  - Households: 4,025

Economy
  - Income class: 2nd municipal income class
  - Poverty incidence: 3.08% (2023)
  - Revenue: ₱ 215.4 million (2024)
  - Assets: ₱ 589.6 million (2024)
  - Expenditure: ₱ 155.3 million (2024)

Service provider
  - Electricity: Ilocos Norte Electric Cooperative (INEC)
- Time zone: UTC+8 (PST)
- ZIP code: 2920
- PSGC: 0102804000
- IDD : area code: +63 (0)77
- Native languages: Ilocano; Tagalog
- Website: www.bangui.gov.ph

Bangui, officially the Municipality of Bangui (Ilocano: Ili ti Bangui; Filipino: Bayan ng Bangui), is a municipality in the province of Ilocos Norte, Philippines. According to the 2024 census, it has a population of 15,227 people.

The first power generating windmill farm in Southeast Asia, commonly known as Bangui Wind Farm, is found in the municipality of Bangui.

== Etymology ==
The name Bangui is derived from the word bangee, referring to an edible seaweed of red algal genus Laurencia (Laurencia sp.) that thrives abundantly along the town's coastal areas.

Historically, in 1786, the settlement frequently endured raids by Moro pirates. To address this threat, Gobernadorcillo Francisco Fernandez organized local bands of fighters to protect the community. These defenders called themselves Bangi which is abundant in the coastal settlements, a name that was later adopted by Spanish authorities as the official designation of the municipality.

In 1901, following the transfer of colonial power to the Americans, the name of the municipality was changed to Bangui. The modification in spelling was intended to provide a more euphonic or harmonious sound, aligning with American linguistic preferences.

== History ==
The earliest known inhabitants of Bangui were the Itneg (Tinguians), Samtoy (Ilocano) settlers, and Malay traders. These groups initially established settlements in areas now known as Baruyen, originally called Bacruyen (meaning "to carry"), and Banban, formerly known as Bamban (meaning "split bamboo").

In 1572, Spanish conquistador Juan de Salcedo led an expedition to Northern Luzon to pacify the local population. Upon his arrival in the area, Salcedo and his men introduced Western culture and Christianity, resulting in the construction of churches, some of which remain standing to this day.

In 1786, a Spanish merchant named Francisco Fernandez was appointed as Gobernadorcillo of the area. Fernandez organized local residents into vigilant groups to defend against Moro pirates, who frequently raided coastal settlements. A Spanish church in Taguiporo was destroyed during one such raid. These local fighters adopted the name "Bangi," derived from a type of edible seaweed abundant in the area. The term "Bangi" was later adapted by the Spanish as "Bangui," which became the official name of the municipality. The 1818 census noted there were 1,449 native families and 5 Spanish-Filipino families in Bangui.

With the arrival of the Americans in 1901, the spelling of the town's name was changed from "Bangi" to "Bangui" to give it a more euphonic sound. By 1913, Bangui was officially recognized as a municipality under American governance. The Americans constructed a road connecting Laoag and Cagayan, facilitating trade between the Cagayan Valley and the Ilocos Region. They also introduced public education, established barrios, and developed a lumber industry in Baruyen, where gold, asbestos, and manganese were mined.

During the Japanese occupation of the Philippines, many residents of Bangui evacuated to the mountains. Some became guerrilla fighters, while others engaged in subsistence farming.

Following the end of World War II, the Philippines gained independence on July 4, 1946, under American legislation. In 1954, Pagudpud, originally a barrio of Bangui, was established as a separate municipality through Executive Order No. 13, issued by President Ramon Magsaysay.

Bangui was one of the municipalities in the Ilocos region where various human rights violations were documented during the martial law era, despite public perception that the region was supportive of the Marcos administration. Eight farmers in Bangui are documented to have been "salvaged" in 1984. That same year, three indigenous community members in Vintar, and a number of farmers from the towns of Vintar, Dumalneg, Solsona, Marcos and Piddig were also documented to have been tortured.

The Bangui Wind Farm project of NorthWind Power Development Corp. (NorthWind) began commercial operations in 2005 and eventually became a major tourist site for Bangui. Ayala-owned AC Energy eventually took over Northwind and of the Bangui Wind Farm in 2017, acquiring a total of 67.79% of Northwind stocks.

== Geography ==
The Municipality of Bangui is borderedd by Burgos to the west, Pagudpud to the northeast, Dumalneg to the east, Vintar to the south, and the South China Sea to the north.

Bangui is situated 64.98 kilometres (40.38 mi) from the provincial capital Laoag and 550.49 kilometres (342.06 mi) from the country's capital city of Manila.

=== Barangays ===
Bangui is politically subdivided into 14 barangays. Each barangay consists of puroks and some have sitios.

- Abaca
- Bacsil
- Banban
- Baruyen
- Dadaor
- Lanao
- Malasin
- Manayon
- Masikil
- Nagbalagan
- Payac
- San Lorenzo (Poblacion)
- Taguiporo
- Utol

==== Dispute ====
On August 10, 2012, Barangay San Isidro was transferred to Dumalneg town based on the decision of Supreme Court over the disputed barangay.

=== Climate ===
Climate data for Bangui, Ilocos Norte
Month	Jan	Feb	Mar	Apr	May	Jun	Jul	Aug	Sep	Oct	Nov	Dec	Year
Mean daily maximum °C (°F)	31 (88)	32 (90)	33 (91)	34 (93)	34 (93)	34 (93)	33 (91)	32 (90)	32 (90)	33 (91)	32 (90)	31 (88)	33 (91)
Mean daily minimum °C (°F)	19 (66)	20 (68)	21 (70)	23 (73)	24 (75)	24 (75)	24 (75)	24 (75)	24 (75)	23 (73)	22 (72)	21 (70)	22 (72)
Average rainfall mm (inches)	6.2 (0.24)	11.7 (0.46)	10.1 (0.40)	14 (0.6)	192.7 (7.59)	258.9 (10.19)	470.9 (18.54)	475.9 (18.74)	405.7 (15.97)	92.5 (3.64)	44.8 (1.76)	2 (0.1)	1,985.4 (78.23)
Average rainy days	3	2	2	2	12	15	20	20	17	10	6	3	112
Source: World Weather Online (modeled/calculated data, not measured locally)

== Demographics ==
Population census of Bangui

Year	Pop.	±% p.a.
1903	8,215	—
1918	11,152	+2.06%
1939	13,325	+0.85%
1948	14,126	+0.65%
1960	9,026	−3.66%
1970	11,053	+2.04%
1975	11,480	+0.76%
1980	11,122	−0.63%

Year	Pop.	±% p.a.
1990	12,921	+1.51%
1995	13,774	+1.21%
2000	14,327	+0.85%
2007	14,634	+0.29%
2010	15,025	+0.96%
2015	14,672	−0.45%
2020	15,019	+0.49%
2024	15,227	+0.33%

Source: Philippine Statistics Authority

In the 2024 census, the population of Bangui was 15,227 people, with a density of 130 inhabitants per square kilometre or 340 inhabitants per square mile.

== Economy ==
Poverty incidence of Bangui (%)

Source: Philippine Statistics Authority

Agriculture remains as a primary economic source in Bangui. The municipality focuses on local farming livelihoods such as crop production and aquaculture.

== Government ==
=== Local government ===
Former seal of Bangui, used until 2014.

Bangui, belonging to the first congressional district of the province of Ilocos Norte, is governed by a mayor designated as its local chief executive and by a municipal council as its legislative body in accordance with the Local Government Code. The mayor, vice mayor, and the councilors are elected directly by the people through an election which is being held every three years.

=== Elected officials ===
Members of the Municipal Council (2025–2028)
Position	Name
Congressman	Ferdinand Alexander A. Marcos III
Mayor	Denton Lawrence G. Garvida
Vice-Mayor	Joseph T. Sales
Councilors	Myrna C. Garvida
Councilors	Joy R. Soriano
Councilors	Ruben G. Alupay Jr.
Councilors	Justine Philip M. Meneses
Councilors	Elmer C. Faylogna
Councilors	Robert L. Aguete
Councilors	Anna Marie G. Fabi
Councilors	Marino C. Faylogna

== Tourism ==
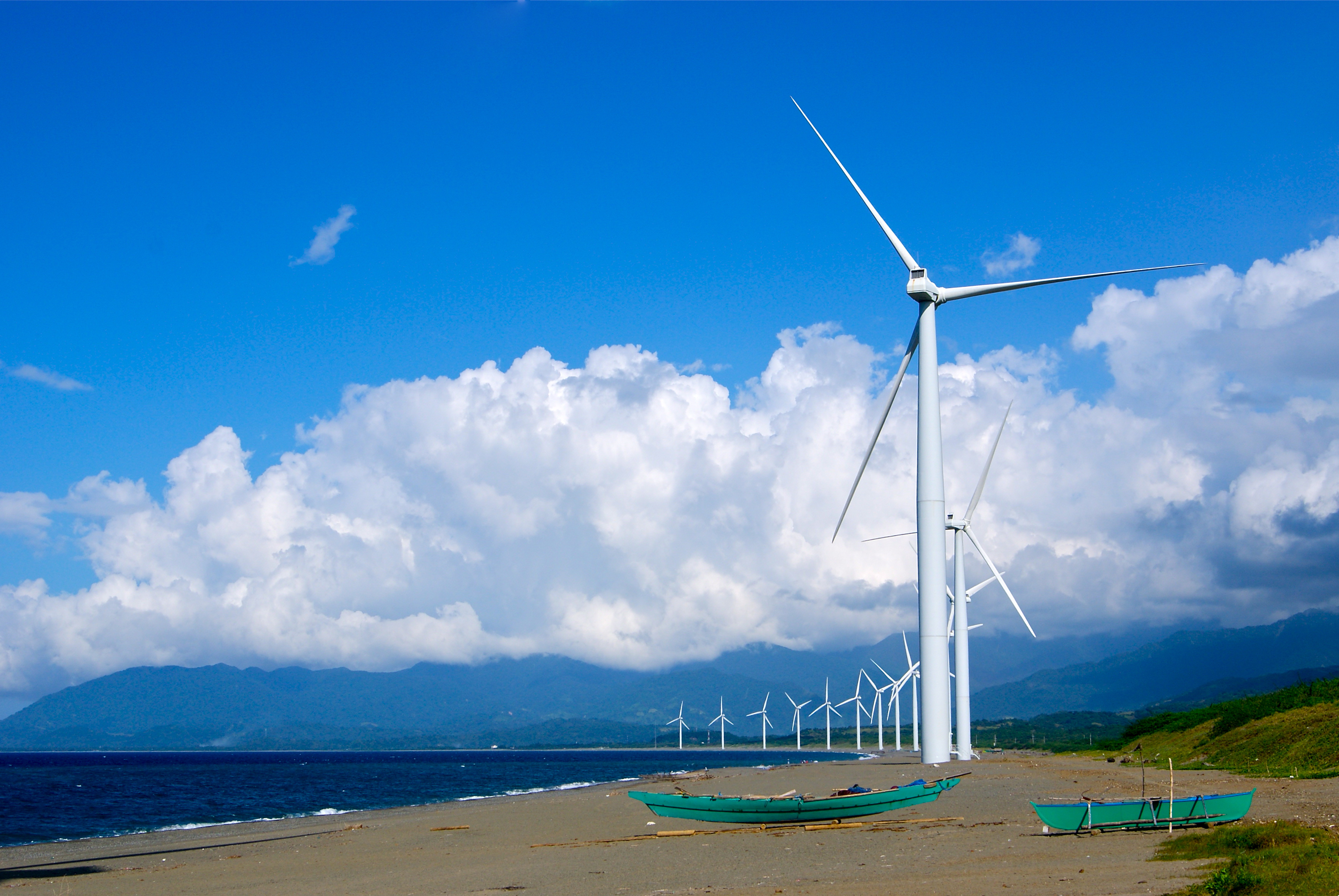
Vestas V82 wind turbines of the Bangui Wind Farm

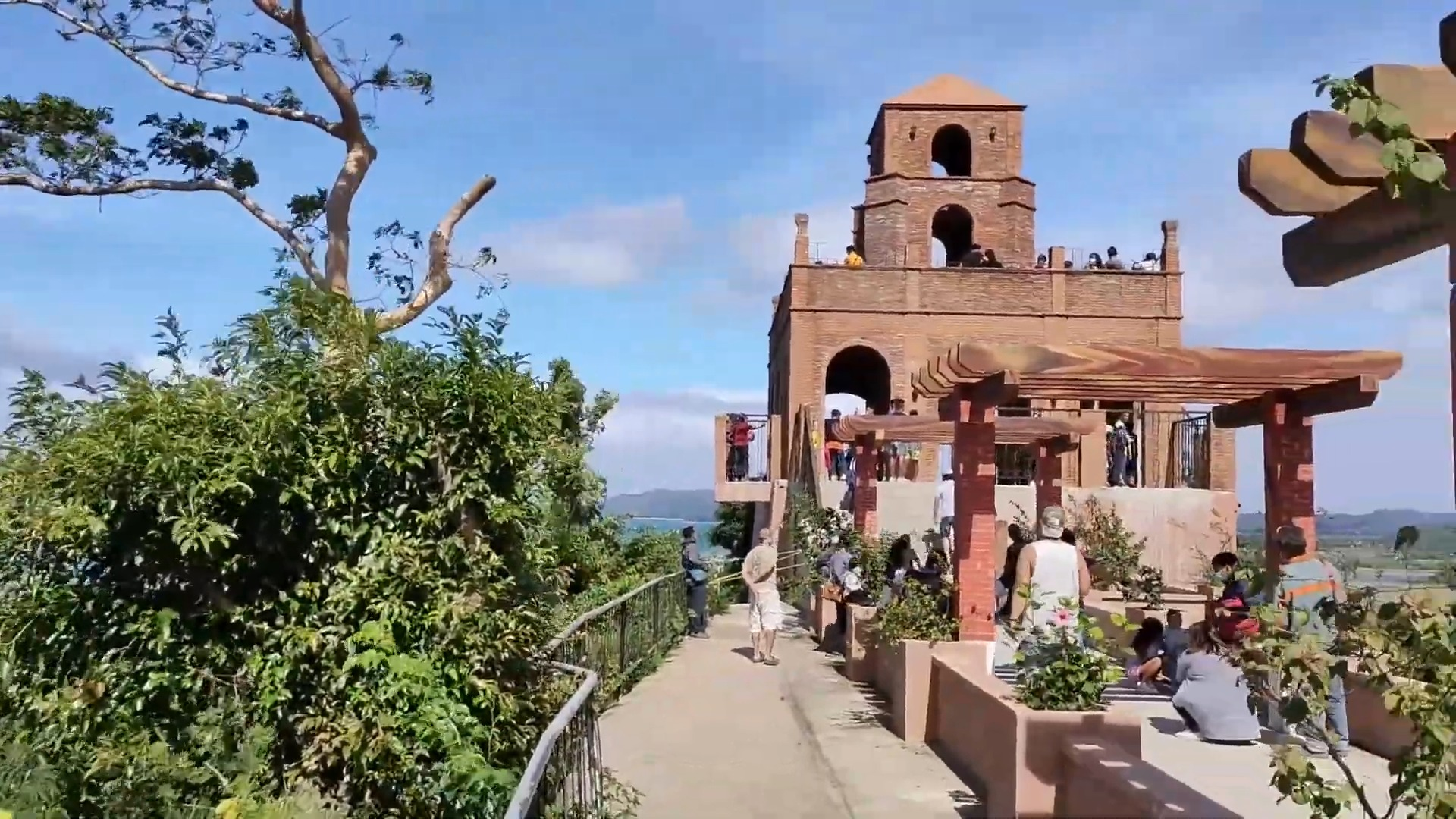
Sentinella Hill

Bangui is well known because of its wind farm, which is the town's main attraction. Although the Burgos and Caparispisan (Pagudpud) Windmills were built in 2013, many visitors still visit Bangui Windmills.

Bangui Bay is a tourist spot, yet not practical for swimming because of its depth and water currents. Instead, tourists often only view its scenery.

Another important tourist attraction is the 400-year old St. Lawrence the Deacon Parish Church, located just adjacent to the Municipal Plaza. The Parish Church is currently under the parochial administration and management of the Congregation of the Rogationists of the Heart of Jesus (Rogationist Fathers), within the canonical jurisdiction of the Roman Catholic Diocese of Laoag. It still features the remains of the old church and the convent, whose institution was initiated by the Augustinians (Order of Saint Augustine - OSA).

Other attractions include:

- Municipal Plaza
- Bolo River (locally known Caramuangen River)
- Bangui Bay View Building
- Baruyen Dam
- Bangui's woodcraft windmills souvenir stores
- Suacan Spring
- Sentinella Hill
- Abang Falls

== Education ==
The Bangui Schools District Office governs all public and private elementary and high schools within the municipality. Some of the schools are located in the Municipality of Dumalneg are under the jurisdiction of the schools district office.

=== Primary and elementary schools ===
- Abaca Elementary School
- Alao-ao Elementary School
- Bacsil Elementary School
- Banban Elementary School
- Bangui Central Elementary School
- Baruyen Elementary School
- Dadaor Elementary School
- Dumalneg Elementary School (located in Dumalneg)
- Lanao Elementary School
- Masikil Elementary School
- Nagbalagan Elementary School
- Paddagan Elementary School
- San Isidro Elementary School (located in Dumalneg)
- Suyo Elementary School
- Taguipuro Elementary School
- UCCP-Nursery & Kindergarten School

=== Secondary schools ===
- Bangui National High School
- Banban National High School
- Dumalneg National High School (located in Dumalneg)
- Lanao National High School
- St. Lawrence the Deacon Academy

== Notable personalities ==
- Roy Cimatu - retired government official
