= SLTEC Calaca Power Station =

Coal-fired power station in Philippines

- Country: Philippines
- Location: Calaca, Batangas
- Coordinates: 13°55′08.7″N 120°49′36.7″E
- Status: Operational
- Commission date: 2015
- Owner: South Luzon Thermal Corp.
- Operator: South Luzon Thermal Corp.

Thermal power station
- Primary fuel: Coal

Power generation
- Nameplate capacity: 270 MW

The SLTEC Calaca Power Station is a 270-MW coal-fired power station in Calaca, Batangas, Philippines.

== History ==
The power plant was a project of South Luzon Thermal Corp. (SLTEC), a company jointly owned by Trans-Asia Oil and Energy Development Corp. of the PHINMA Group and AC Energy (ACEN) of the Ayala Group.

The first unit of SLTEC's coal power station in Calaca, Batangas became operational on April 24, 2015 and the second one on February 25, 2016.

By 2021, ACEN would acquire full stakes on SLTEC, acquiring the shares of Axia Power Holdings Philippines of Marubeni. ACEN would completely divest it shares on SLTEC in 2022, marking its full transition to renewable energy. This marks the commencement of the plant's early retirement by 2030.
