= Kaangrian Falls =

Waterfall located in Burgos, Ilocos Norte, Philippines

Coordinates: 18.445°N 120.630°E

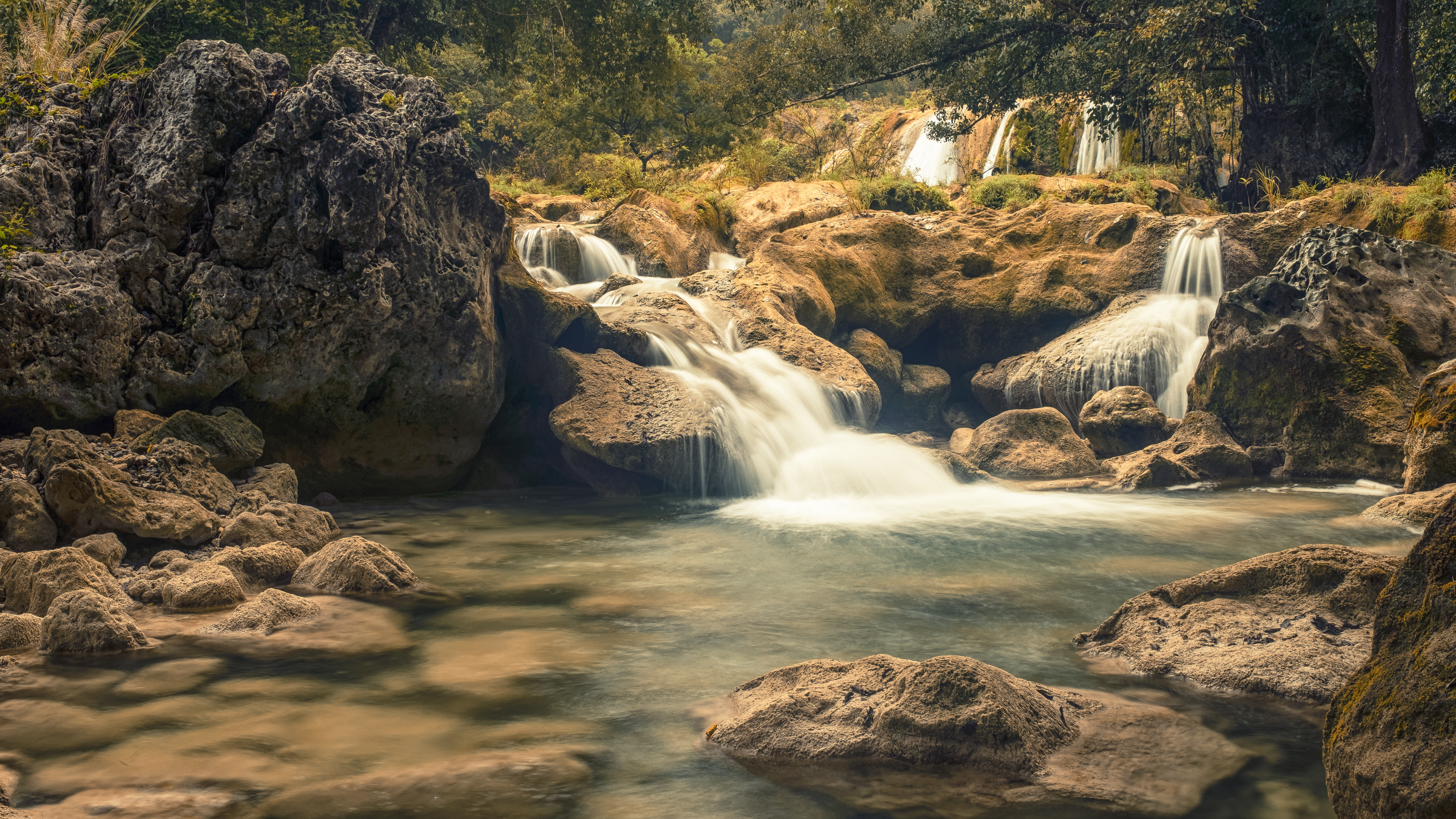
- Water flowing over Kaangrian Falls rock formation
- Interactive map of Kaangrian Falls
- Location: Burgos, Ilocos Norte

Kaangrian Falls is a natural waterfall and popular tourist attraction in Burgos, Ilocos Norte, Philippines.

Located in Barangay Agaga, this multilayered falls is 40 minutes away from the city proper. It gets its name “Kaangrian” from the Ilocano term “naangri” that translates to stinky. This is due to the smell of bat droppings from the nearby bat caves.

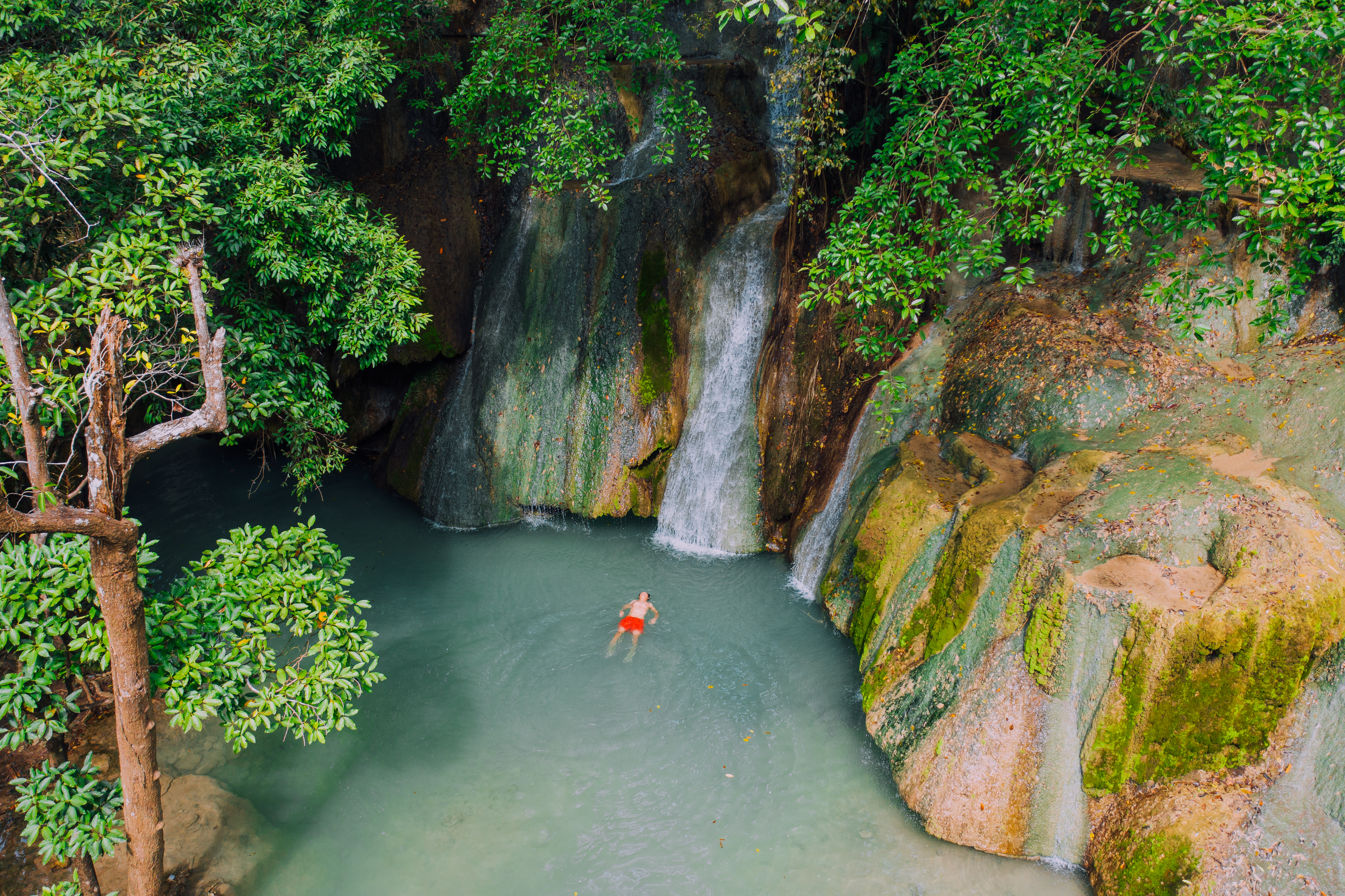
Kaangrian Falls Basin

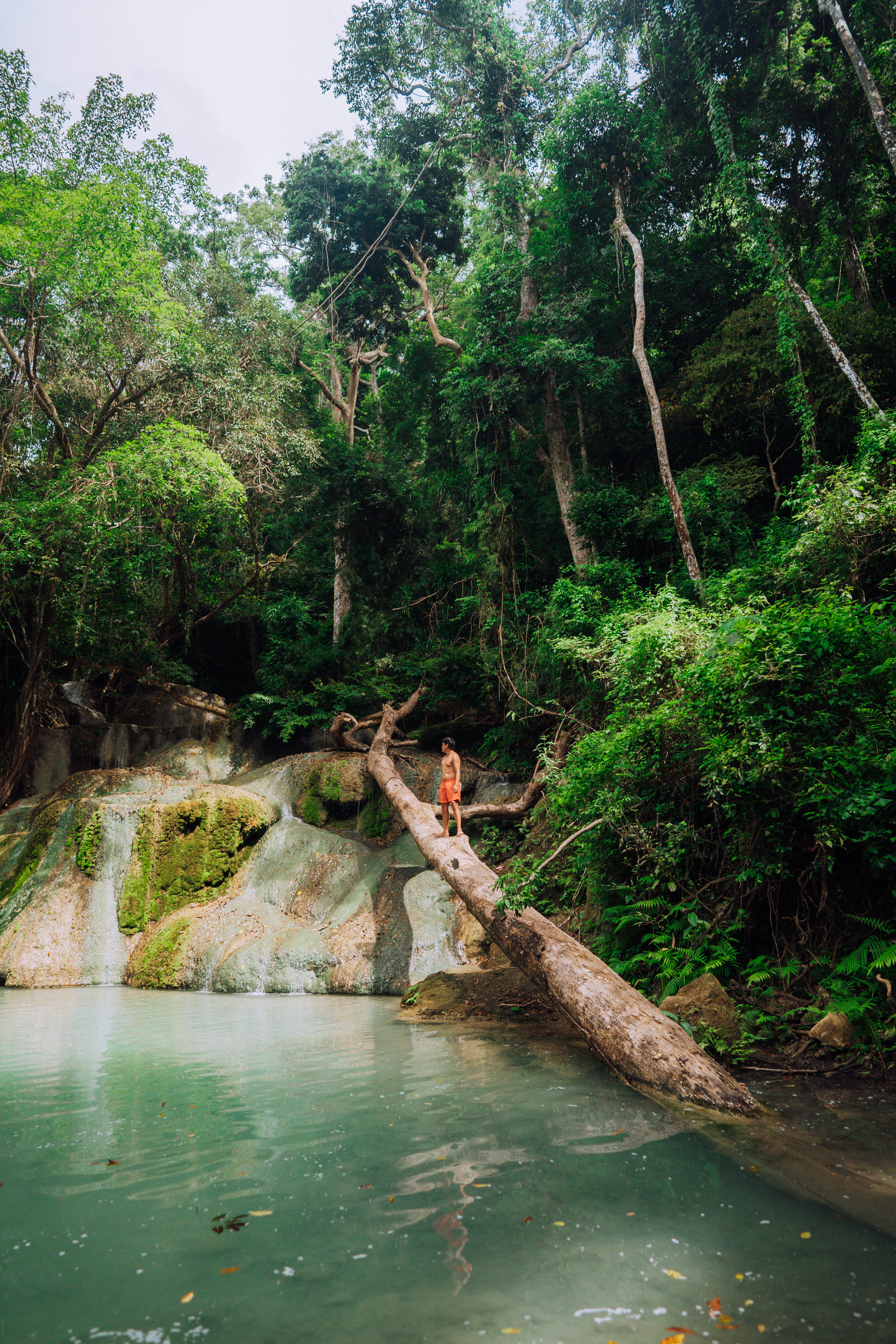
Fallen trees around Kaangrian Falls

Closeup of falls
