= Burgos Wind Farm =

Wind farm in the Philippines

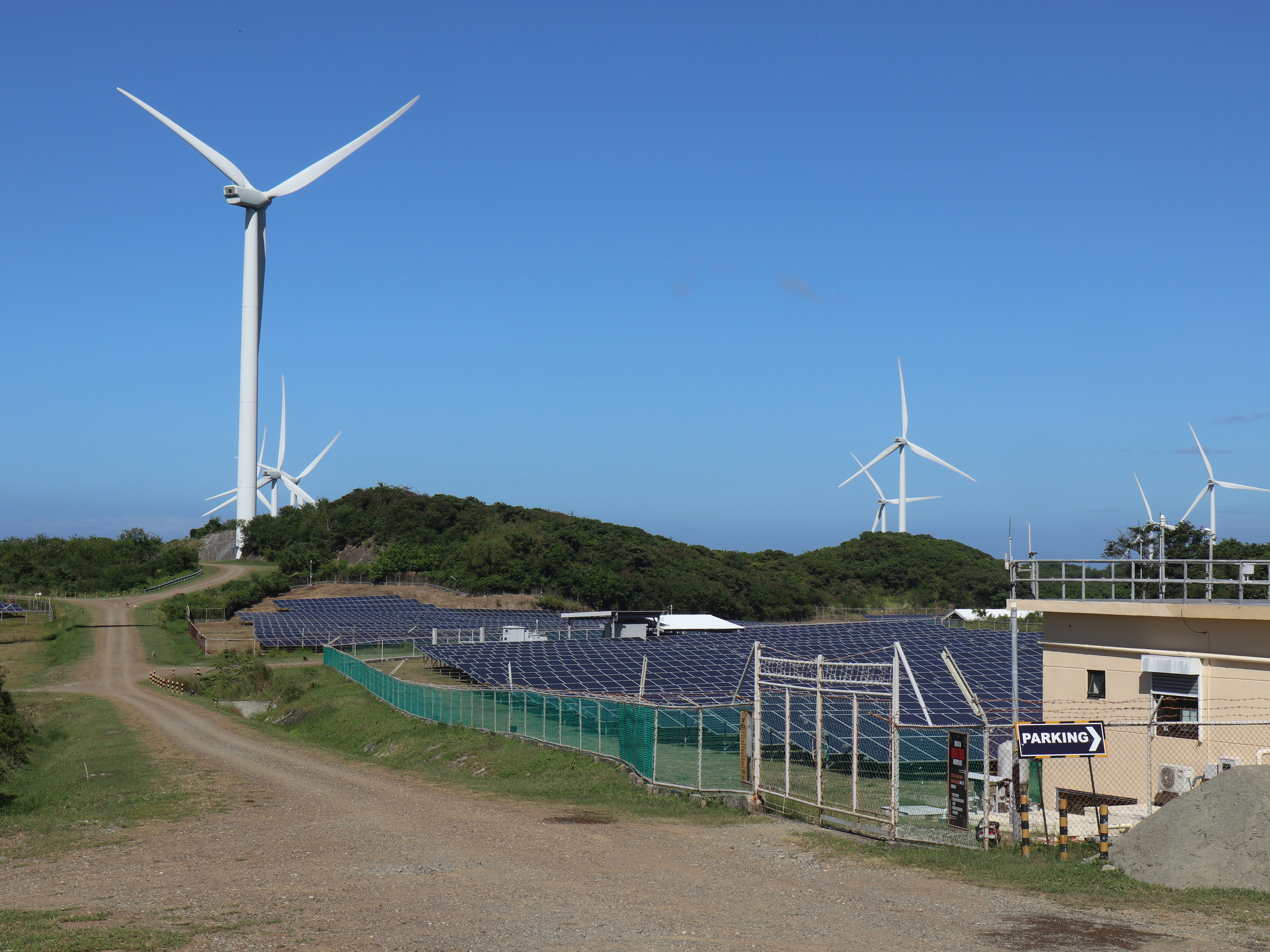
- Country: Philippines
- Location: Burgos, Ilocos Norte
- Coordinates: 18°30′58″N 120°38′46″E
- Status: Operational
- Construction began: April 19, 2013
- Commission date: November 5, 2014
- Construction cost: US$450 million
- Owner: Energy Development Corporation
- Operator: Vestas

Wind farm
- Type: Onshore
- Rotor diameter: 90 m (295 ft)
- Site area: 600 ha (6,000,000 m^{2})

Power generation
- Units operational: 50
- Make and model: Vestas V90-3MW
- Nameplate capacity: 150 MW
- Annual net output: 233 GWh

External links
- Commons: Related media on Commons

Burgos Wind Farm is a wind farm in Burgos, Ilocos Norte, Philippines. It is the second wind farm built in the province of Ilocos Norte and the largest project of its kind in the Philippines. The estimated cost for the construction of the wind farm was US$450 million. The wind farm was commissioned on November 9, 2014, and upon its completion it became the largest wind farm in the country and in Southeast Asia, covering 600 hectares and three barangays of Burgos, namely Saoit, Poblacion, and Nagsurot. The project was the first one to be nominated by the Department of Energy as eligible for the department's feed-in tariff (FIT) scheme.

Under the Renewable Energy Act of 2008, the Philippine Energy Regulatory Commission can "(guarantee) fixed rate per kilowatt-hour – the FIT rates – for power producers harnessing renewable energy under the FIT system." In February 2015, the ERC agreed to give a FIT rate of P8.53 per kilowatt hour for 20 years to the Burgos Wind Farm of the Energy Development Corporation.
