= Tanap-Avis Falls =

Waterfalls in Burgos, Ilocos Norte, Philippines

Coordinates: 18.4767°N 120.6733°E

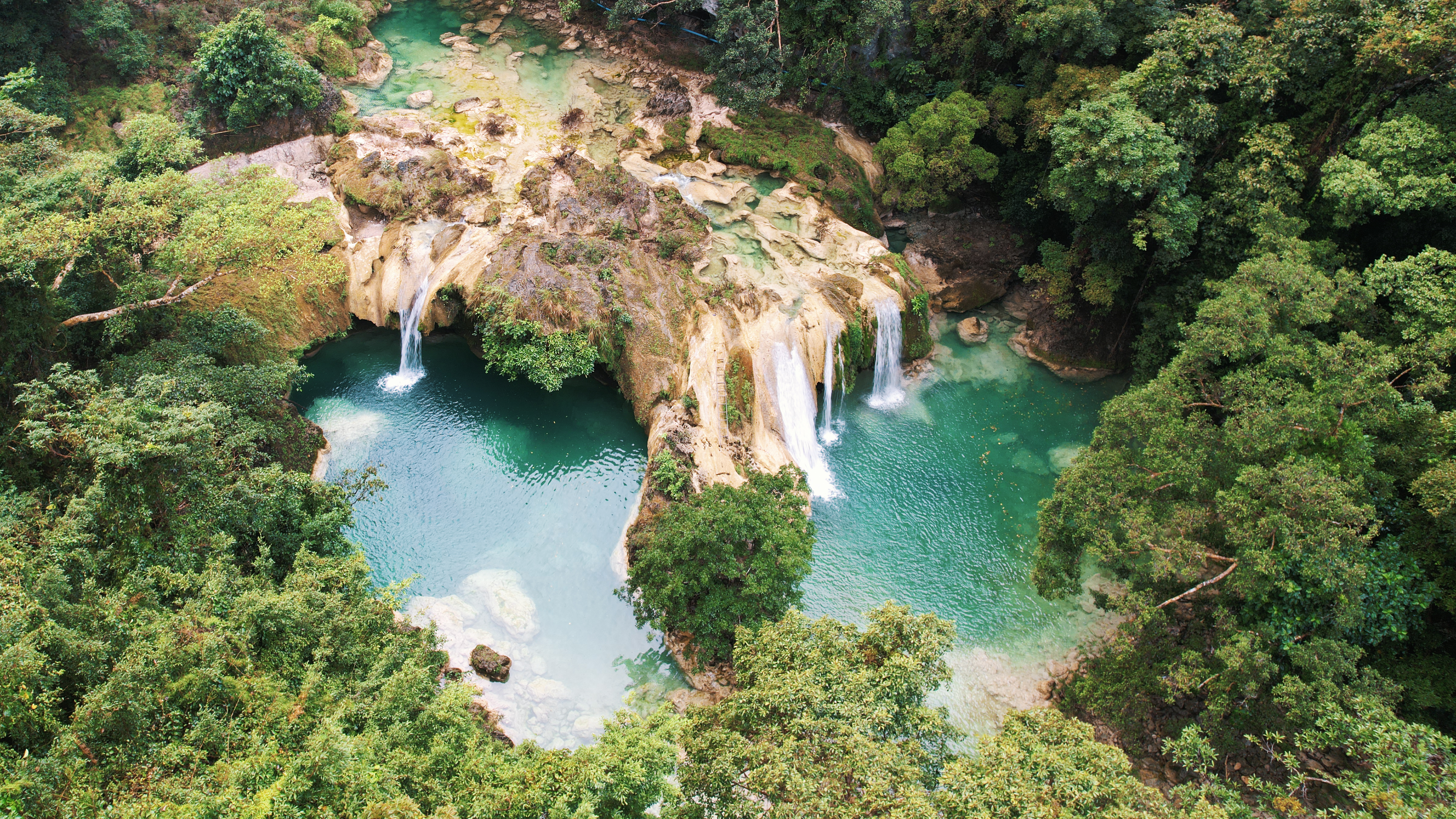
- The clear basins of Tanap-Avis Falls
- Interactive map of Tanap-Avis Falls
- Location: Burgos, Ilocos Norte, Philippines

Tanap-Avis Falls is a natural waterfall in Burgos, Ilocos Norte, Philippines. The basin-like waterfalls is a popular destination because of its pigmented turquoise waters. It is part of a watershed forest reserve under the National Integrated Protected Areas System (NIPAS) of the DENR-Protected Areas and Wildlife Bureau.

Rock formations of Tanap-Avis Falls
