= Bangui Wind Farm =

Wind farm in the Philippines

Bangui Wind farm
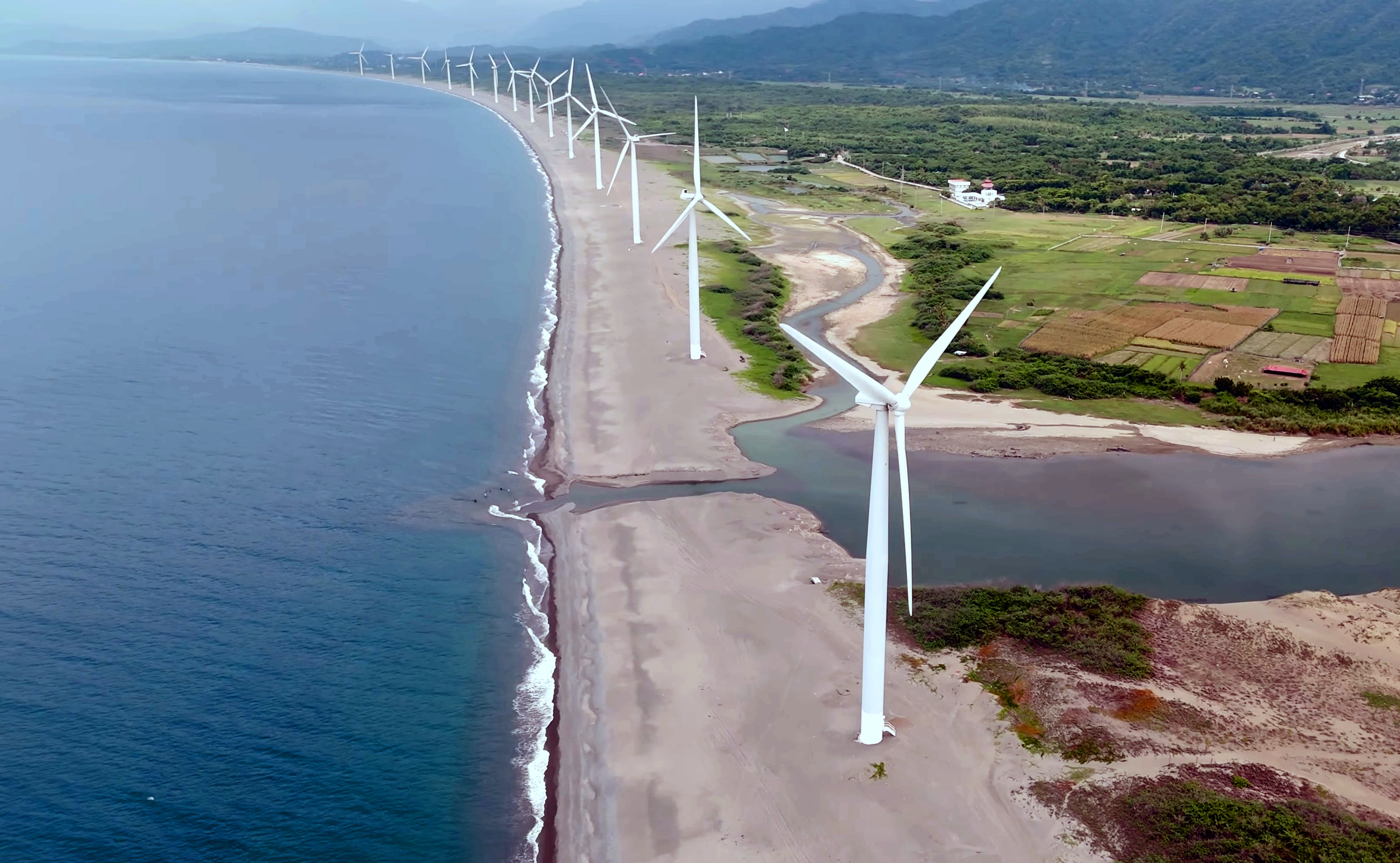
- Country: Philippines
- Location: Bangui, Ilocos Norte
- Coordinates: 18°31′40″N 120°42′50″E
- Status: Operational
- Commission date: June 20, 2005
- Owners: Ayala Corporation through AC Energy (67.79% ownership as of 2017)
- Operator: NorthWind Power Development Corp.

Wind farm
- Type: Onshore
- Hub height: 70 m (230 ft)

Power generation
- Units operational: 20 X 1.65 MW
- Make and model: Vestas: V82
- Nameplate capacity: 33 MW

External links
- Commons: Related media on Commons

The Bangui Wind Farm is a wind farm in Bangui, Ilocos Norte, Philippines. The wind farm uses 20 units of 70-meter (230 ft) high Vestas V82 1.65 MW wind turbines, arranged in a single row stretching along a 9-kilometer (5.6 mi) shoreline of Bangui Bay, facing the West Philippine Sea.

Phase I of the NorthWind power project in Bangui Bay consisted of 15 wind turbines, each with a maximum production capacity of 1.65 MW of electric power, making a total of 24.75 MW. These 15 on-shore turbines are placed 326 meters (1,070 ft) apart, each 70 meters (230 ft) high, with 41 meters (135 ft) long blades, with a rotor diameter of 82 meters (269 ft) and a wind swept area of 5,281 square meters (56,840 sq ft).

Phase II was completed in August 2008, and added five more of the same wind turbines, bringing the total maximum capacity to 33 MW.

Ayala Corporation energy platform AC Energy, which already holds the controlling shares in Bangui Wind Farm as of 2021, has announced its intent to acquire 100% of the shares of NorthWind in order to boost their renewable energy portfolio, pending approvals from oversight entities like the Philippine Competition Commission.

== Location ==
The NorthWind Bangui Bay Project is located in the municipality of Bangui, Ilocos Norte, Philippines, at the northwest tip of Luzon island. The turbines face the sea from where the prevailing wind blows towards the land. Its location along the shore is optimal, due to a lack of windbreaks and limited terrain roughness. The site consists of 20 Vestas Wind Systems stretching 9 kilometers (5.6 mi) over the shoreline of the bay.

The location of the Philippines near the Asia-Pacific monsoon belt is ideal for installing wind turbines. State meteorological agency Philippine Atmospheric, Geophysical and Astronomical Services Administration states that the Philippines has a mean average of about 31 watts per square meter (W/m^{2}) of wind power density.

== History ==
=== 1996 NREL study ===
In 1996, the National Renewable Energy Laboratory (NREL) conducted a wind resource analysis and mapping study. It concluded that various areas in the Philippines are ideal for wind power installation. These areas include Bangui and Burgos towns in Ilocos Norte, Batanes and Babuyan Islands, which are north of Luzon and the higher interior terrain of Mindoro, Samar, Leyte, Panay, Negros, Cebu, Palawan and eastern Mindanao.

=== Development by NorthWind ===
The study led to the inception of the wind farm project. NorthWind Power Development Corp. developed (and maintains and operates) the project, while Vestas Wind Systems, a Danish firm, supplied the wind turbine-generator units (WTGs) for the site, similar to those already found in Denmark. The project was to have been developed in three phases, with Phase I of the project inaugurated on June 18, 2005.

Engineer Niels Jacobsen, president and chief executive of the Northwind Power Development Corp., started work on the 24.75-megawatt project in 1999.

Ratified by the NorthWind Power Development Corp and the International Bank for Reconstruction and Development through the World Bank Prototype Carbon Fund, the Northwind Bangui Bay Project was the first project in the Philippines to have the Emissions Reduction Purchase Agreement (ERPA) under the Clean Development Mechanism. The Bangui Bay Project is also the first Philippine recipient of the Carbon Emission Reduction Certificates (CER's) from the executive board of the United Nations Framework Convention on Climate Change.

Phase I consisted of 15 turbines, placed 326 meters apart, was completed on May 7, 2005, generating 24.74 megawatts. An additional 5 turbines brought the capacity to 33 megawatts, which was transmitted 5.7 km (3.5 mi) to an electrical substation in Laoag City. Connected to the Luzon Grid, the windmills supply 40% of Ilocos Norte's electricity needs. Each windmill is 70 m (230 ft) tall, with 41 m (135 ft) long blades.

=== Commercial operation ===
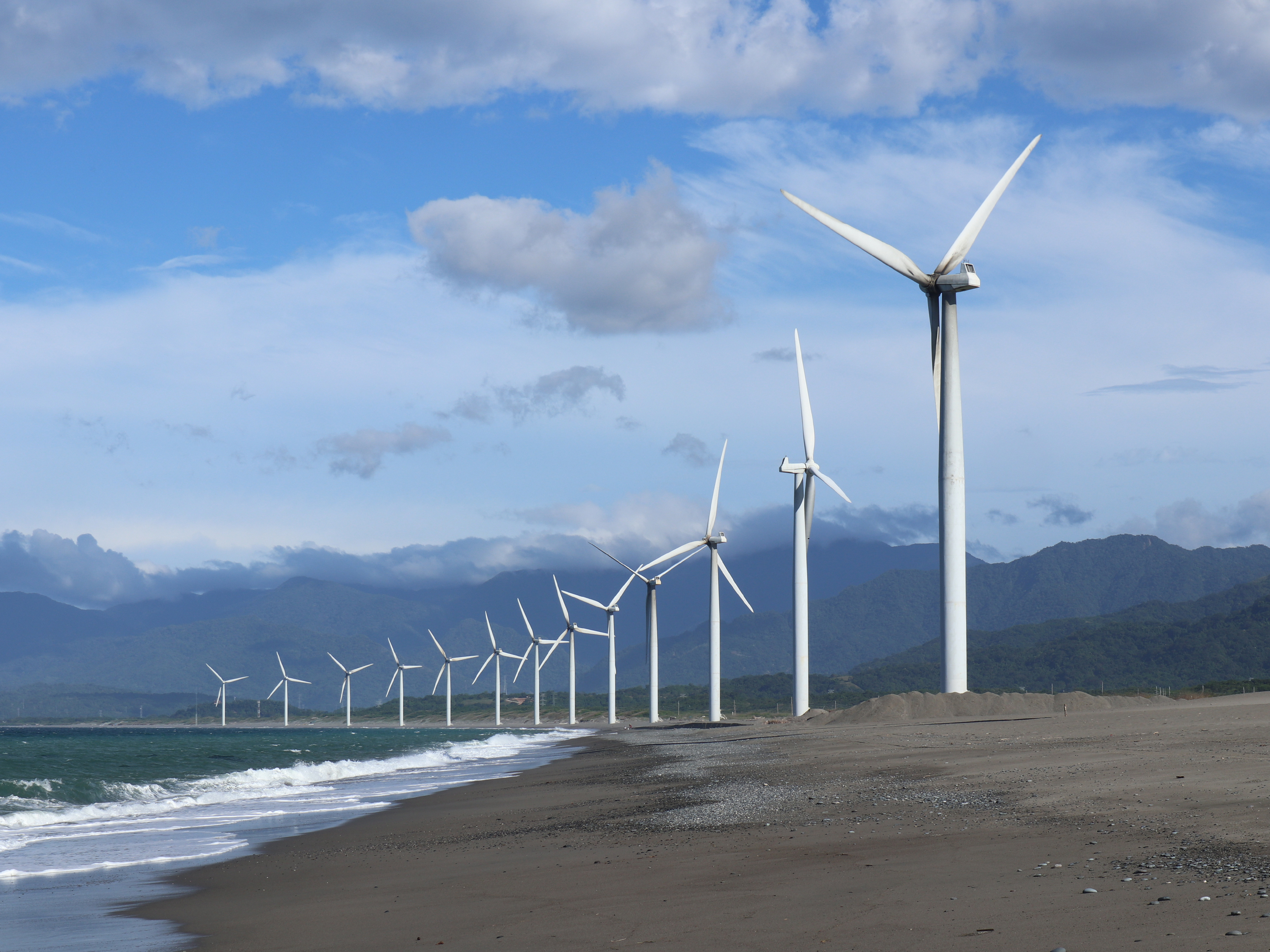
The wind farm in 2022

The project began commercial operation in 2005, eventually becoming a major tourist site for Bangui.

In 2006, the project produced a 5% discount of the weighted average price in the wholesale electricity spot market (WESM) or a generated savings of approximately US$1.4 million (PhP 70 million) for the INEC electricity consumers. The project cost for Phase I amounted to US$23 million.

=== Ownership by the Ayala Group ===
AC Energy, the listed energy platform of the Ayala Group, eventually took control of Northwind and of the Bangui Wind Farm in 2017, acquiring a total of 67.79% of Northwind stocks.

In 2021, AC Energy announced its intent to acquire 100% of the shares of NorthWind in order to boost the renewable energy portfolio of the Ayala Group in anticipation of its plans to achieve net zero greenhouse gas emissions by 2050. The purchase is pending approvals from Philippine government oversight entities like the Philippine Competition Commission.

== See also ==
- Sustainable energy
- Wind Energy Power System (Philippines Wind Farm)
