= ACEN Corporation =

Philippine renewable energy company

ACEN

- Ayala Triangle Gardens, site of the headquarters of ACEN Corporation
- Trade name: PSE: ACEN
- Type: Public
- Industry: Renewable energy
- Founded: 2011; 15 years ago
- Headquarters: 35th Floor, Ayala Triangle Gardens Tower 2, Paseo de Roxas corner Makati Ave, Makati Central Business District, Makati City, 1226 Metro Manila, Philippines, Philippines
- Key people: Cezar Consing; (Chairman); Gerardo Ablaza, Jr.; (Vice-Chairman); Eric Francia; (President & CEO)
- Services: Solar energy; Wind energy
- Parent: Ayala Corporation
- Subsidiaries: ACEN Australia
- Website: www.acenrenewables.com

ACEN Corporation, formerly AC Energy, is the energy firm under the Ayala Group. The company has around 7,000 MW of attributable renewables capacity across the Philippines, Australia, Vietnam, India, Indonesia, Laos, and the U.S.A.

== History ==
In 2011, ACEN made initial investments in the power sector in the Philippines—an investment in a wind farm at Ilocos Norte with a net capacity of 52MW (Northwind Project), a stake in a CFB thermal power plant in Batangas province with two 122MW capacity (SLTEC), a second wind farm in Ilocos Norte with net capacity of 81MW (North Luzon Renewables), a limited partnership in a coal-fired plant at Bataan and Lanao del Norte with a capacity of two 316MW (GNPower Mariveles) and four 138MW (GNPower Kauswagan) respectively, and a limited partnership in two 668MW supercritical coal-fired power plant also in Bataan (GNPower Dinginin).

In 2015, it invested in the development, construction, and operation of a solar farm in Bais, Negros Oriental or the Montesol project.

ACEN obtained a Retail Electricity Supplier's (RES) license in September 2016 so that it could sell electricity to end users in the competitive market. It entered into different agreements with various customers and end-users for the supply of over 100MW.

ACEN started to invest in different countries in the Asia-Pacific region.

In 2017, ACEN established its first footprint outside the Philippines by investing in renewable energy projects with the consortium of Star Energy group and Thailand's Electricity Generating Company (EGCO) which acquired the Salak and Darajat geothermal projects in West Java, Indonesia with combined capacity of 637MW of steam and power. A year after, in 2018, the Sidrap wind project is AC Energy's first greenfield project offshore and is the first utility-scale wind farm in Indonesia with net capacity of 75MW.

In December 2017 at Vietnam, entered into a joint venture with AMI Renewables Energy for New Energy Investments Corporation for investments with Khanh Hoa Solar Power Plant with 50MW of capacity in Khanh Hoa, BMT Dak Lak solar farm with 30MW capacity in Dak Lak province, and in B&T Windfarm which entered into an agreement with Quang Binh province for the development of up to 200MW wind farm. The Khanh Hoa and Dak Lak solar farms were inaugurated in May and April 2019, respectively.

In April 2018, ACEN and Jetfly Asia, entered into an agreement for acquisition of the 25 percent interest in The Blue Circle as well as co-investment rights in its projects in Southeast Asia.

In May 2018, ACEN entered the Australian renewable energy market through a joint venture with UPC Renewables. Through its international subsidiary, invested US$30 million for 50 percent ownership in UPC-AC Energy Renewables Australia. ACEN also extended a US$200 million revolver facility to partially fund Australian projects including the New England Solar Farm in Uralla, New South Wales with an expected net capacity of 700MW. UPC-AC Energy Renewables Australia is also developing wind farms on Robbins Island and Jim's Plain, North West Tasmania with a targeted net capacity of up to 1,000MW.

In June 2018, ACEN entered a partnership with the BIM Group of Vietnam for the development of an aggregate of 330MW of solar power plants located in the province of Ninh Thuan.

In May 2019, in partnership with The Blue Circle, jointly construct, own and operate the Mui Ne Wind Farm located at Binh Thuan province of Vietnam—first phase of construction for 40MW with potential expansion of up to 170MW capacity.

In June 2019, completed the acquisition of a 51.48 percent stake in PHINMA Energy with its purchase of secondary shares, growing to 66.34 percent of ownership. PHINMA Energy was renamed as AC Energy Philippines. It was officially renamed to ACEN in 2022, following the integration of the company's international and Philippine business.

In November 2019, partnered with Yoma Strategic for a joint venture with Yoma Micro Power to develop around 200MW of additional renewable energy projects within Myanmar including participation in large utility scale renewable projects.

On March 10, 2024, ACEN Group chief investment officer Patrice Clausse and BrightNight CEO, Martin Hermann, in a 50/50 joint venture invested $1.2 billion in building a 1-gigawatt renewable power focusing on large-scale hybrid wind-solar projects until 2029.

On April 28, 2024, Jaime Z. Urquijo, the 35-year-old son of heiress Bea Zobel Jr. had been elected ACEN Director along with Gerardo C. Ablaza, replacing Delfin Lazaro, husband of Cheche Lazaro and Jose Rene Almendras.

== Energy Projects and Affiliates ==
ACEN have business entities that carry out operations of power generation in renewable and thermal energies. It has grown from a Philippine-based investment to international ventures in the Asia-Pacific region.

=== Renewables Philippines ===
North Luzon Renewables owns and operates an 81 MW wind farm in Pagudpud, Ilocos Norte. The plant started its commercial operations in November 2014. The wind farm uses 27 units wind turbines with 3MW installed capacity.

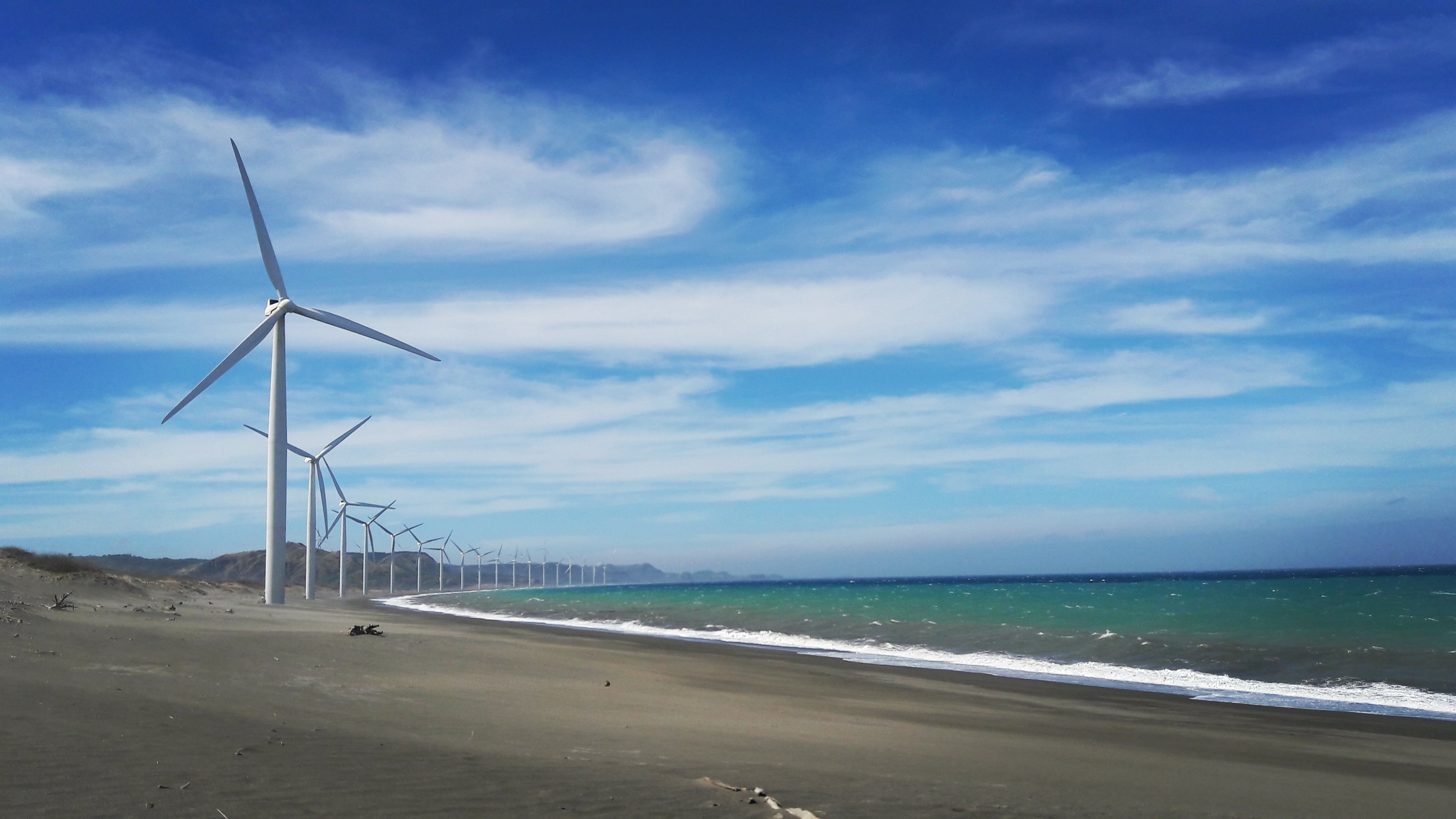
The Bangui Wind Farm of North Wind Power

Northwind Power owns and operates a 52 MW wind farm in Bangui Bay, Ilocos Norte. Phase I consists of 15 wind turbines; Phase II was completed in August 2008 and added five more wind turbines increasing the capacity to 33 MW. Six wind turbines with a capacity of 19 MW were added in 2014 as North Wind Power's third phase, bringing its total capacity to 52 MW.

Monte Solar Energy Inc. (MonteSol) is a wholly owned subsidiary and started its full commercial operations in February 2016 with 18MW solar farm and serves the power requirements of Bais, Dumaguete and Cebu. The solar farm uses 67,920 modules of solar panels and 17 units of inverters.

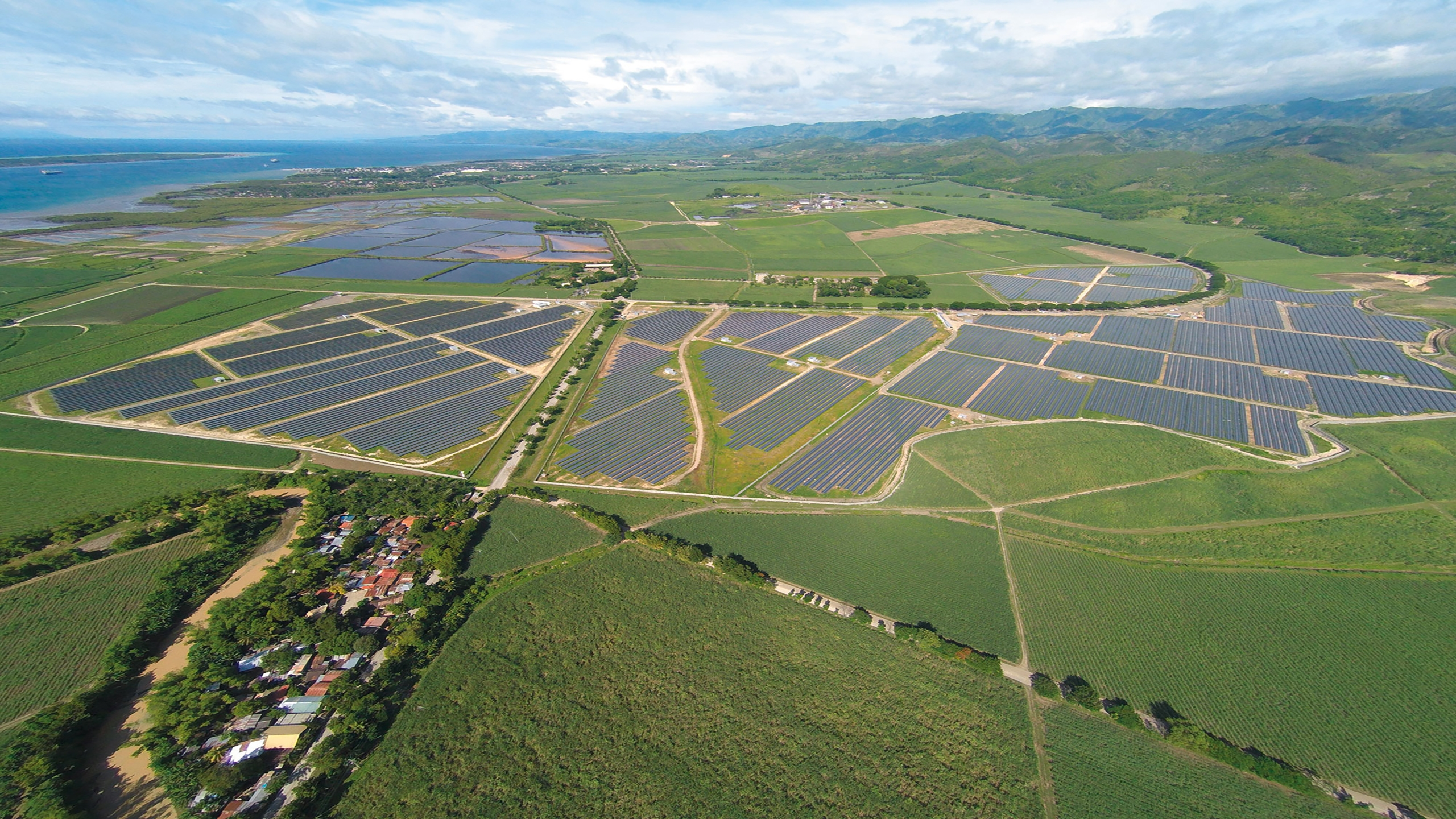
SaCaSol I solar power plant in San Carlos City, Negros Occidental.

San Carlos Solar Energy (SaCaSol) solar farm is the Philippines’ first utility-scale solar farm that began construction in September 2013 and currently delivers about 70 million kW hours to the grid. AC Energy only has 4 percent stake with SacaSol. The project is located on a total of 70-hectare property within San Carlos Ecozone in San Carlos City, Negros Occidental.

Negros Island Solar Power Inc. (IslaSol) is a special purpose vehicle composed of the second and third solar power plants built by clean energy developers, Visayas Renewables Corp. (AC Energy Devco) and Macquarie Infrastructure and Real Assets' PINAI Fund. The utility-scale solar farms are located on the island of Negros and carry a total capacity of 80 MWp—in La Carlota (Phase 1 and 2), and in Manapla (Phase 3). AC Energy has an economic stake of 2 percent in IslaSol. It supplies approximately 200,000 homes with electricity generated from 302,136 solar modules and 77 inverters.

=== Renewables International ===
ACEN Australia, a wholly owned subsidiary of ACEN, has more than 1GW capacity in construction or shovel ready, and more than 4GW capacity in the development pipeline. Its renewable energy assets include solar, wind, battery and pumped hydro and energy storage projects across Australia. ACEN Australia's first operational project will be New England Solar which has been in construction since 2021. It is one of Australia's largest solar projects to be participating in the National Electricity Market and is the largest solar project in Australia to be financed on a fully merchant basis. The 400 MW Stubbo Solar in the NSW Central Orana Renewable Energy Zone is ACEN Australia's second project which commenced construction in late 2022. Other ACEN Australia projects include New England Battery (NSW), Birriwa Solar (NSW), Valley of the Winds (NSW), Aquila Wind (NSW), Phoenix Pumped Hydro (NSW), Robbins Island and Jim's Plain Wind (TAS) and North East Wind (TAS). On March 6, 2024, ACEN Australia and Marubeni Asian Power Singapore agreed on a joint investment of A$250 million, in a 400-megawatt-hour battery energy storage system in Melbourne, Australia. “The agreement is another milestone for ACEN Australia’s inaugural project, New England Solar, which stands as a major contributor to the National Electricity Market,” ACEN Australia Managing Director David Pollington said.

Salak and Darajat Geothermal in Indonesia have a combined capacity of 235MW equivalent of steam and 402 MW of electricity for a total of 637 net capacity. It is being operated by Star Energy Geothermal (Salak-Darajat), with AC Energy's stake at 20 percent.

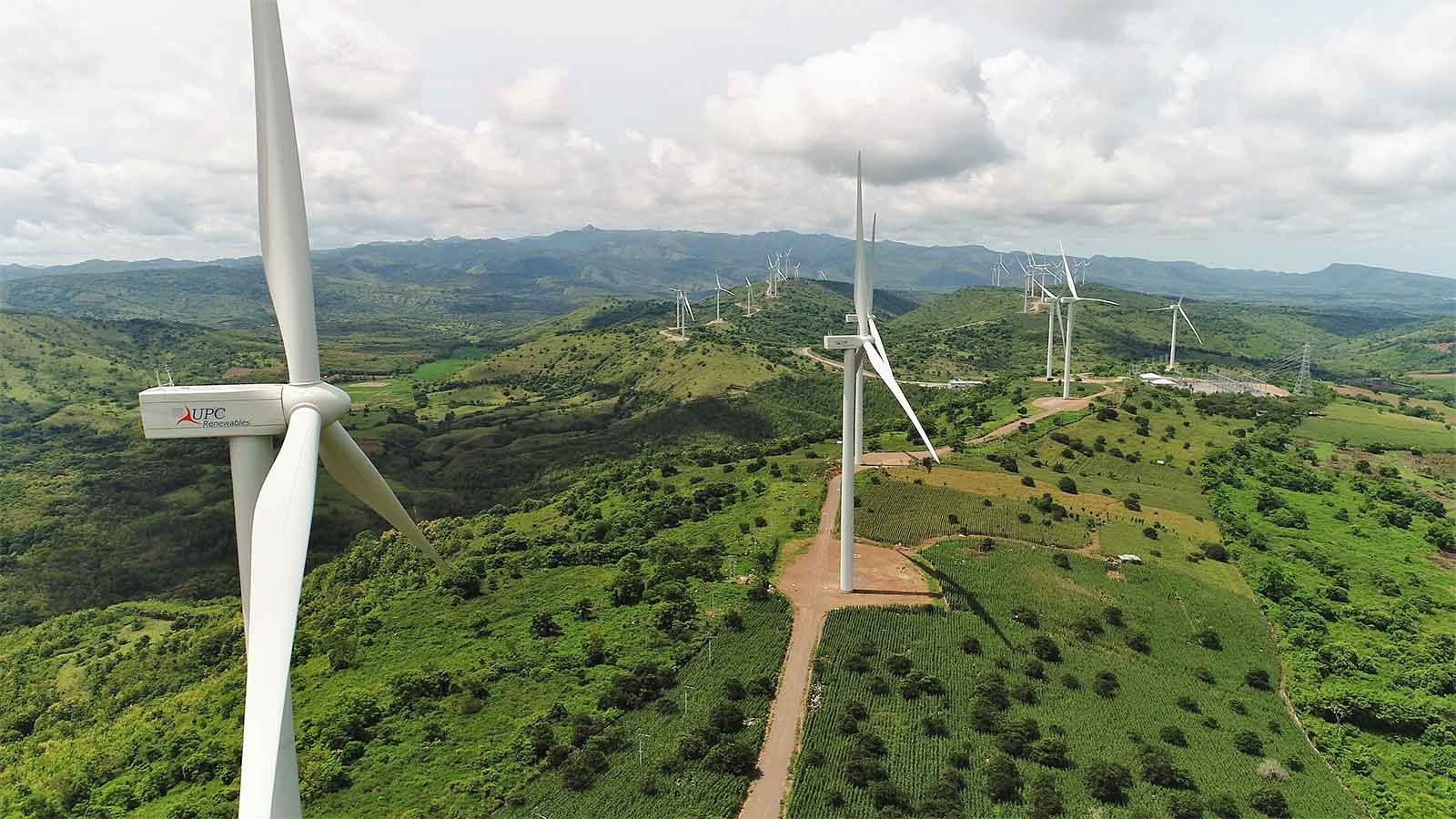
The first large-scale Sidrap Wind Farm in Indonesia

Sidrap Wind Farm project is a 75MW wind farm in South Sulawesi, Indonesia. It is the first greenfield investment of AC Energy outside the Philippines. The project started in 2016 and was commenced commercial operations in March 2018 as the first utility-scale wind farm project in Indonesia.

Ninh Thuan Solar is operated under BIM\AC Renewables, a joint venture with BIM Group of Vietnam. Ninh Thuan Solar farm has a capacity of 330MW and it is one of the largest solar farms in Southeast Asia. The project was inaugurated and began operations in April 2019.

Khanh Hoa & Dak Lak Solar is a joint venture with AMI Renewables under AMI\AC Renewables. It composed of solar plants with a combined capacity of 80MW in the provinces of Khanh Hoa and Dak Lak, Vietnam. It is inaugurated and energized in April 2019.

Mui Ne Wind is a partnership with The Blue Circle and is located in Binh Thuan province, Vietnam. It will have a capacity of 40MW in the first phase of construction up to 170MW.
