= Electricity sector in the Philippines =

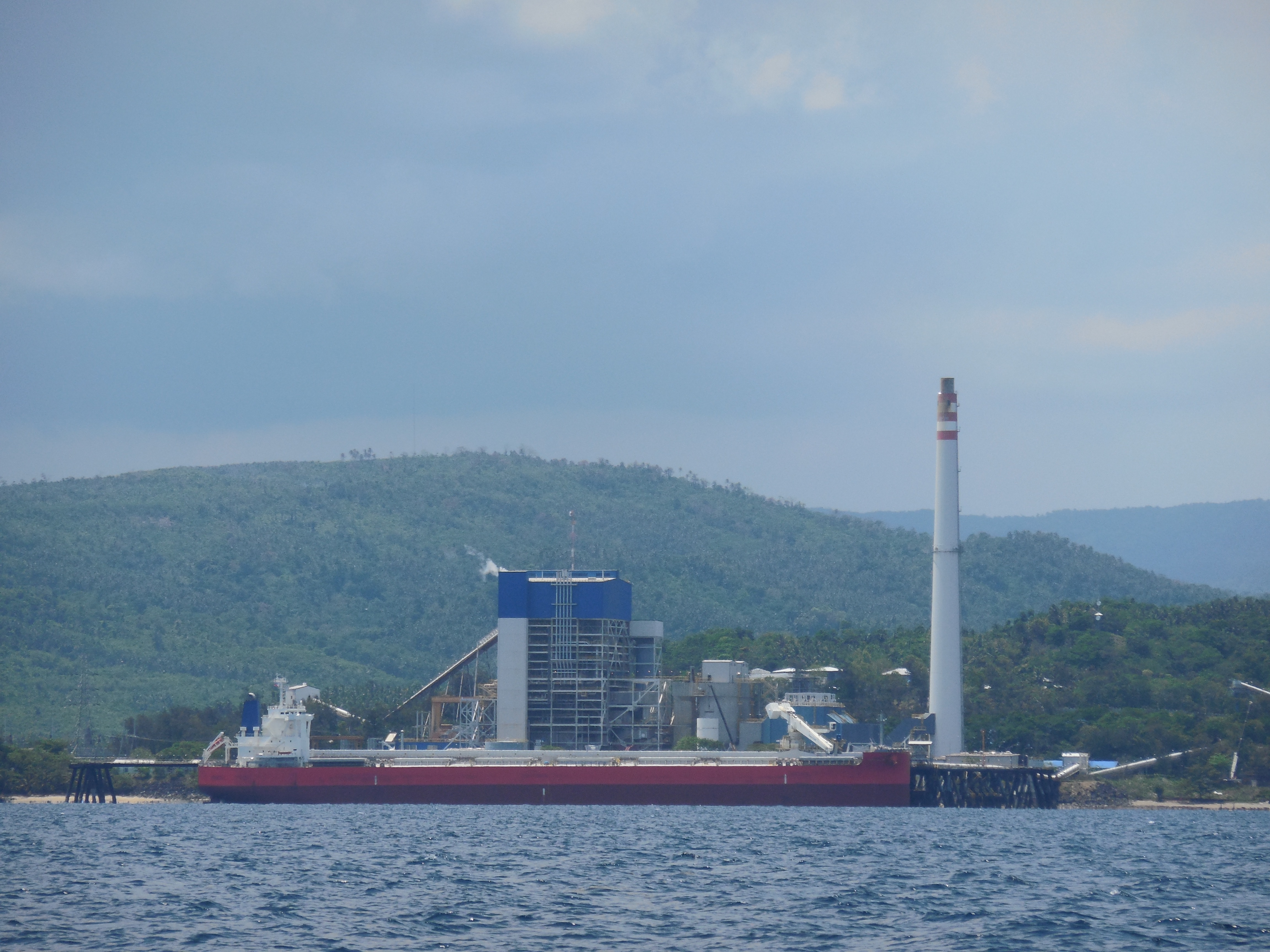
The coal-fired Quezon Power Plant in Barangay Cagsiay I in Mauban, Quezon.

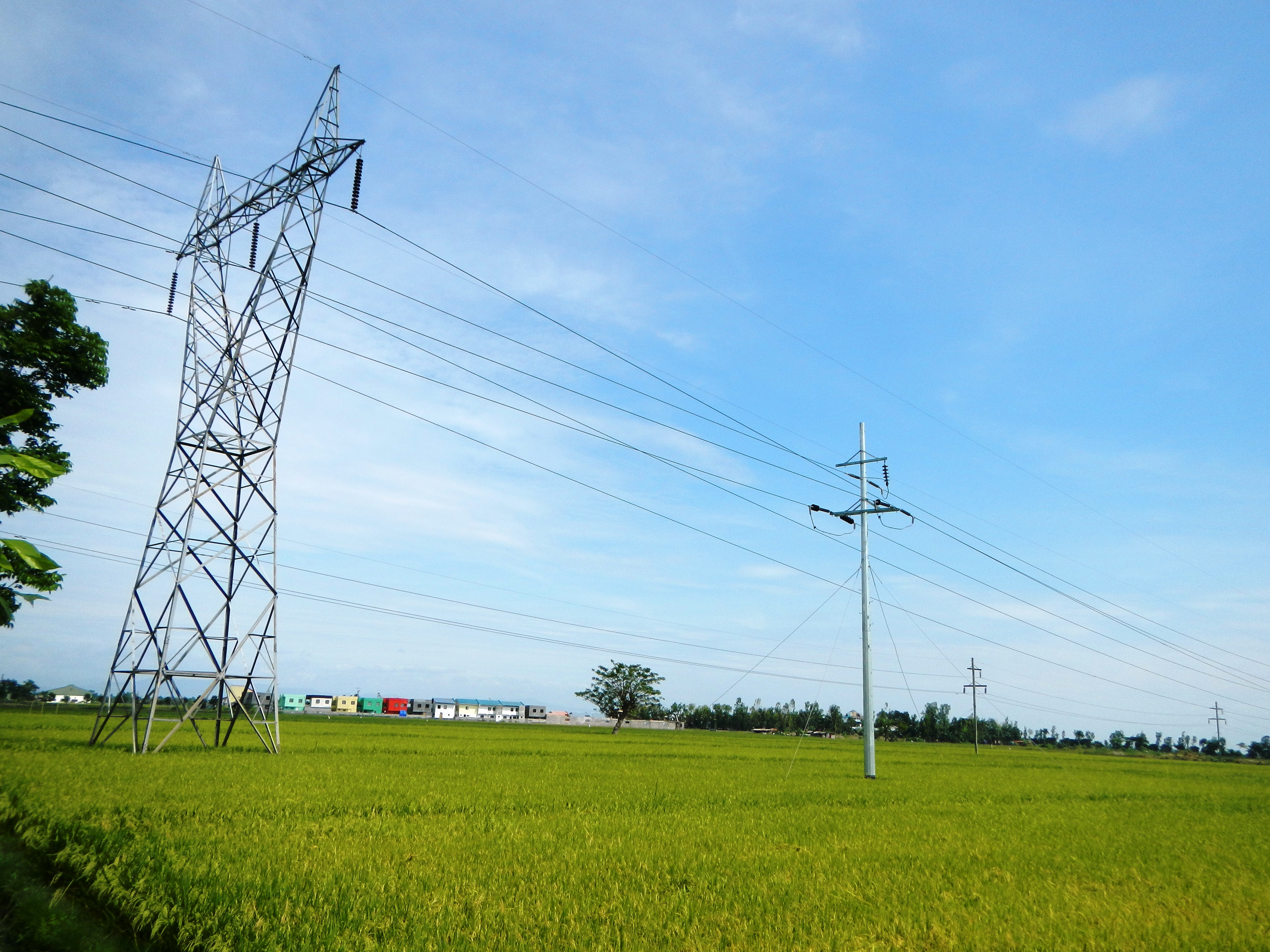
Electricity pylons in San Leonardo, Nueva Ecija

The electricity sector in the Philippines provides electricity through power generation, transmission, and distribution to many parts of the country. The Philippines is divided into three electrical grids, one each for Luzon, the Visayas and Mindanao.

As of June 2016, the total installed capacity in the Philippines was 20,055 megawatts (MW), of which 71.5% was on the Luzon grid. About 12% of Filipinos have no access to electricity. The Philippines is also one of the countries in the world that has a fully functioning electricity market since 2006 called the Philippine Wholesale Electricity Spot Market (WESM) and is operated by an independent market operator. By 2017, coal-powered electric energy began to comprise more than 50% of the nationwide power generation in the country.

As of 2025, the Philippines has the second-highest electricity rate in Southeast Asia after Singapore.

== History ==
=== Manila ===
==== La Electricista ====
La Electricista, founded in 1892, was the very first electric company to provide electricity in Manila. It built the first electric generating plant in the country, the Central Power Plant, on Calle San Sebastián (now Felix Resurreccion Hidalgo Street) in Manila.

==== Meralco ====
Meralco was established as the Manila Electric Railroad and Light Company in 1903. It was created to provide light and an electric railway system to Manila.

During World War II the transportation infrastructure of Meralco was destroyed and instead of rebuilding the railway, the company focused its efforts onto its electric services.

During the 1960s, a group of Filipino investors led by Eugenio Lopez Sr. bought Meralco from its American investors. Meralco proceeded to expand during this time, it was also during this period that Meralco became the very first billion peso company in the Philippines.

During the 1970s, the Philippine government made it a state policy to nationalize major power generation facilities. Meralco sold all of its generating plants to the National Power Corporation (NAPOCOR/NPC) and, thus, electric distribution became its core business, until the deregulation of the electric power market in March 1, 2003, when TransCo took over the Philippine power grid from NAPOCOR.

=== 20th Century ===
On July 28, 1969, Republic Act No. 6038 or the National Electrification Administration Act was approved.

On December 9, 1992, Republic Act No. 7638 or the Department of Energy Act of 1991, which created the Department of Energy, was approved.

On December 8, 1994, Republic Act No. 7832 or the Anti-electricity and Electric Transmission Lines/Materials Pilferage Act of 1994, which penalizes the theft of electricity and line materials, was approved.

On June 8, 2001, Republic Act No. 9136 or the Electric Power Industry Reform Act of 2001 or EPIRA Law was approved.

On December 16, 2008, Republic Act No. 9513 or the Renewable Energy Act of 2008 was approved.

On May 7, 2013, Republic Act No. 10531 or the National Electrification Administration Reform Act of 2013, which amends Presidential Decree No 269, was approved.

On April 12, 2019, Republic Act No. 11285 or the Energy Efficiency and Conservation Act was approved.

On August 8, 2019, Republic Act No. 11361 or the Anti Obstruction of Power Lines Act was approved.

=== 21st century ===
On August 8, 2019, Republic Act No. 11371 or the Murang Kuryente Act was approved.

In January 2022, President Rodrigo Duterte signed into law Republic Act 11646 that aims to spur microgrid development in unserved and underserved areas nationwide to achieve the government's goal of 100 percent electrification in the country.

On January 8, 2025, Republic Act No. 12120 or the Philippine Natural Gas Industry Development Act was approved.

== Power generation ==
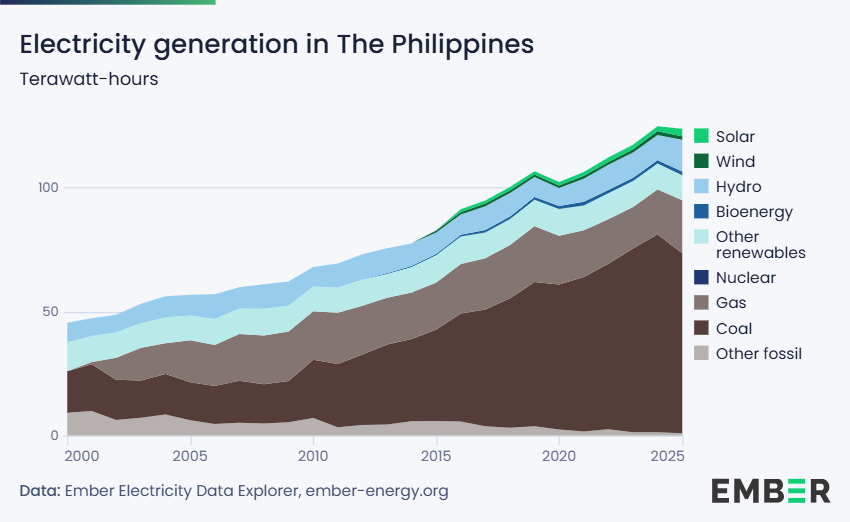
Electricity generation in the Philippines in terawatt-hours

Power generation in the Philippines is not considered as a public utility operation, which means interested parties do not need to secure a congressional franchise to operate a power generation company. However, power generation is regulated by the Energy Regulatory Commission (ERC) who must issue a certificate of compliance to interested parties to ensure that the standards set forth in the Electric Power Industry Reform Act of 2001 (EPIRA) are followed. The ERC is also responsible for determining any power abuse or anti-competitive behavior.

Electricity in the Philippines is produced from various sources such as coal, oil, natural gas, biomass, hydroelectric, solar, wind, and geothermal sources. The allocation of electricity production can be seen in the table below, according to data from the Department of Energy Power Statistics:

Source	Percentage
Coal	42.8%
Oil-Based	7.4%
Natural Gas	24.2%
Hydro	11.8%
Geothermal	13.3%
Other Renewable Sources (Wind, Solar, Biomass)	0.05%

Table 1. Power generation by source as of 2014

Source	Operational
Hydroelectric	29
Geothermal	11
Solar/Photovoltaic	2
Wind	4
Coal	11
Diesel	5
Natural Gas	3
Oil	1

Table 2. Number of operational power plants in the Philippines

=== Fossil fuels ===
Coal, oil, and natural gas are the most abundant fossil fuels in the Philippines.

==== Coal ====
Coal has the largest reserve and is often the cheapest fossil fuel. Throughout the years, the demand for coal has been steady despite environmental concerns. According to Energy Global, there is potentially an approximate of 270 billion tons of coal resources.

In 2017, total electric energy produced from coal began to comprise more than 50% of the nationwide gross power generation, and by 2024, the Philippines surpassed Indonesia in having the most coal-dependent grid in Southeast Asia. Although the government had halted the acceptance of new coal power plants in 2020 to encourage investment in other energy sources, the rise in coal-powered energy production has been credited to the coal-driven ventures of San Miguel Corporation and Aboitiz Group.

==== Oil and natural gas ====
In June 2011, the Philippine Department of Energy (DOE) estimated a total of 27.9 billion cubic feet of oil and a total of 53.9 trillion cubic feet of gas. The estimated total oil production in June 2011 in the Philippines was 63 million barrels.

=== Renewable resources ===
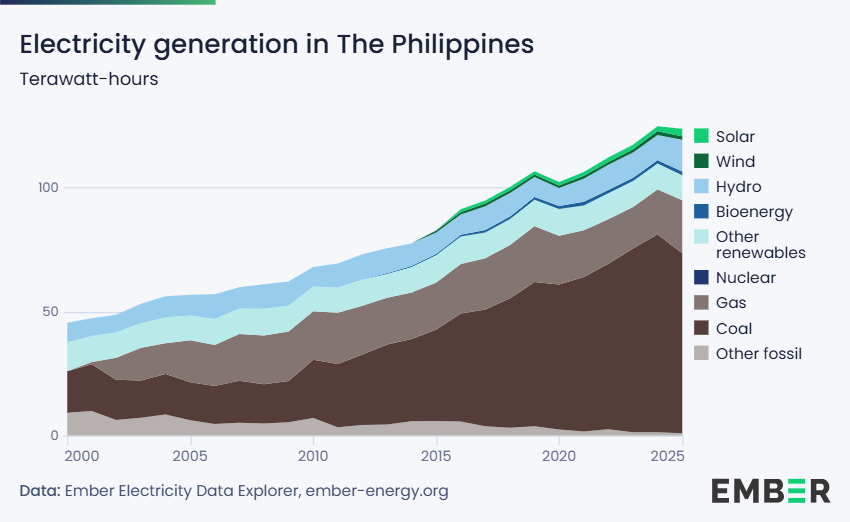
Electricity generation in the Philippines in terawatt-hours

As of 2023, renewable energy sources accounted for about 22% of the Philippines' total installed electricity generation capacity, according to the Department of Energy. The Philippines remains a net importer of fossil fuels, which underscores the government's push to expand local renewable energy options. Available renewable resources include hydropower, geothermal power, wind power, solar power, and biomass power. The government has implemented a range of policies and targets aimed at increasing the contribution of renewables to the country's overall energy mix.

The Philippine government has committed to increasing the share of renewables to 50% of total installed power capacity by 2030, equivalent to about 15.3 gigawatts (GW). This target is aligned with the country's nationally determined contribution (NDC) under the Paris Agreement, which aims to reduce greenhouse gas emissions by up to 75% by 2030.

==== Geothermal power ====
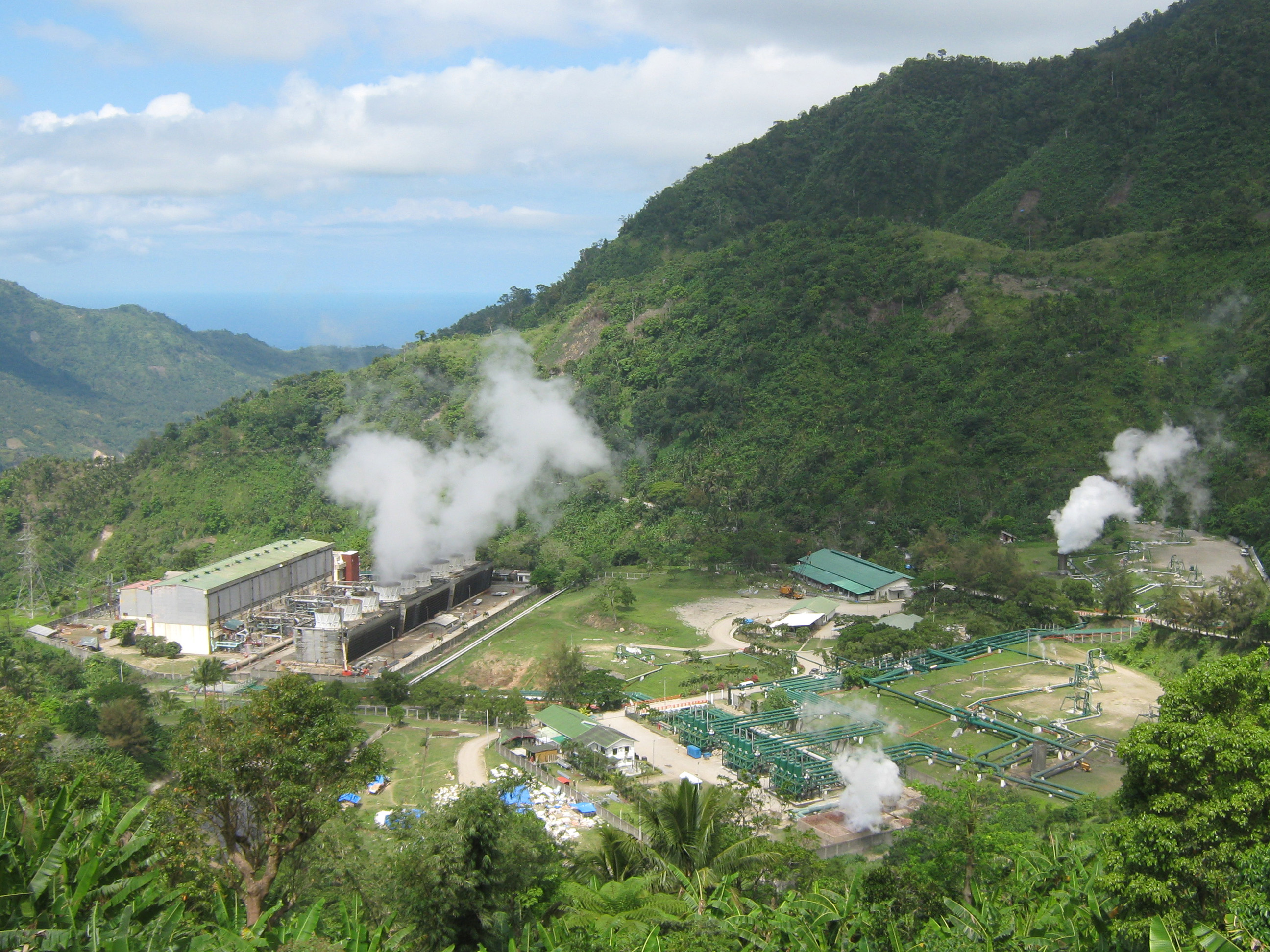
Geothermal power plant in Valencia, Negros Oriental

Geothermal power in the Philippines is the country's second largest source of renewable energy, and the fifth largest source of energy overall. Among sources of renewable energy, it is second only to hydroelectric power, although both sources are surpassed by the amount of energy drawn from coal, oil, and natural gas in that order.

The Philippines is one of the world's top producers of geothermal power, owing to its location along the Ring of Fire zone of Pacific volcanoes. The Geothermal Education Office and a 1980 article titled "The Philippines geothermal success story" by Rudolph J. Birsic published in the journal Geothermal Energy noted the remarkable geothermal resources of the Philippines. During the World Geothermal Congress held in 2000 in Beppu, Ōita Prefecture of Japan, it was reported that the Philippines is the largest consumer of electricity from geothermal sources and highlighted the potential role of geothermal energy in developing countries.

According to a 2015 study by Bertani, the Philippines ranks second to the United States worldwide in producing geothermal energy. The study notes that in 2015, the US had a capacity of 3450 megawatts from geothermal power, while the Philippines had a capacity of 1870 megawatts. The Philippines was then followed by Indonesia, which had 1340 MWe.

Early statistics from the Institute for Green Resources and Environment stated that Philippine geothermal energy provides 16% of the country's electricity. By 2005, geothermal energy accounted for 17.5% of the country's electricity production. More recent statistics from the IGA show that combined energy from the nation's six geothermal fields, located in the islands of Luzon, Leyte, Negros and Mindanao, still accounts for approximately 17% of the country's electricity generation.

In September 2025, the National Geothermal Association of the Philippines (NGAP) announced its 6th International Geothermal Conference aimed at promoting sustainable geothermal energy development.

==== Hydroelectric power ====
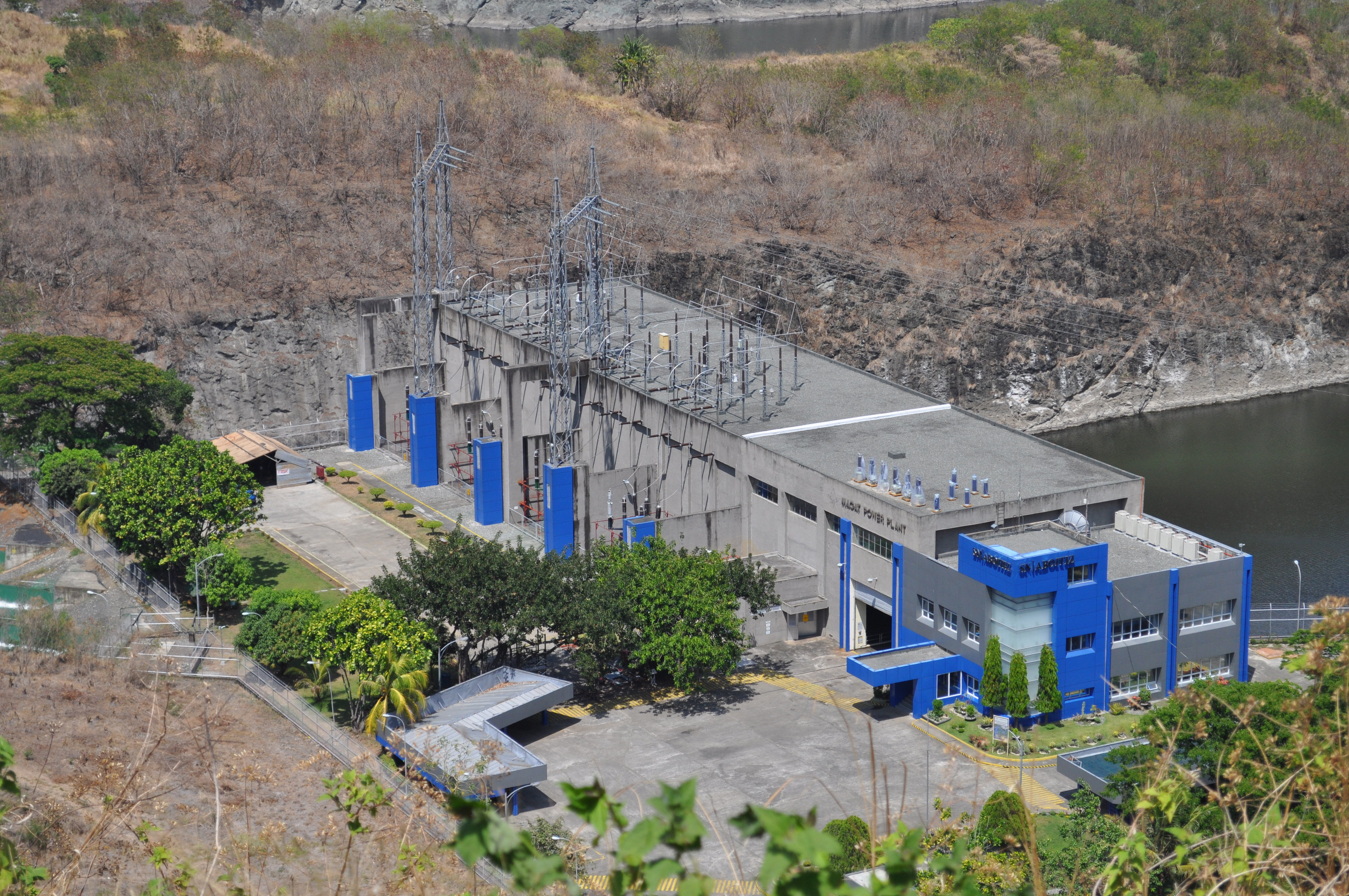
Magat Power Plant

Hydropower is the second dominant renewable energy resource in the Philippines. There are various hydropower plants spread out across the country. Large hydropower plants (more than 50 MW generating capacity) are connected directly to the main transmission grid whereas small (10-50 MW generating capacity) and mini (101 kW to 10 MW generating capacity) hydropower plants are connected to local distribution systems. According to International Renewable Energy Agency, the country has a total potential of 10 GW untapped hydroelectric power.

==== Biomass power ====
The Philippines has an abundant supply of biomass resources including agricultural crop residues, forest residues, animal wastes, agro-industrial wastes, municipal solid wastes and aquatic biomass. The most common agricultural wastes are rice hull, bagasse, coconut shell/husk and coconut coir.

According to DOE, based on the information from Department of Agriculture and the Department of Environment and Natural Resources, the Philippines could produce substantial volumes of residue which could be used as fuel. Despite its huge potential, there has never been any operational WtE project to date due to the lack of financing and management support in the city and municipality levels as well as the conflict with the prevailing "Philippine Clean Air Act (RA 8749)", which prohibits incineration of MSW. According to a feasibility study on waste-to-energy (W2E) of municipal solid waste (MSW), a 100 ton/day W2E plant in the Philippines has an estimated energy generation potentials of 21 GWh/year from incineration, 24 GWh/year from gasification, and 24 GWh/year from pyrolysis. These energy generation potentials may still be increased if the plant capacity is higher than the assumed 100 ton of MSW per day.

Environmentalists have opposed the building of waste-to-energy facilities, saying that "burning waste contributes to greenhouse gas emissions and can release hazardous pollutants".

==== Wind power ====
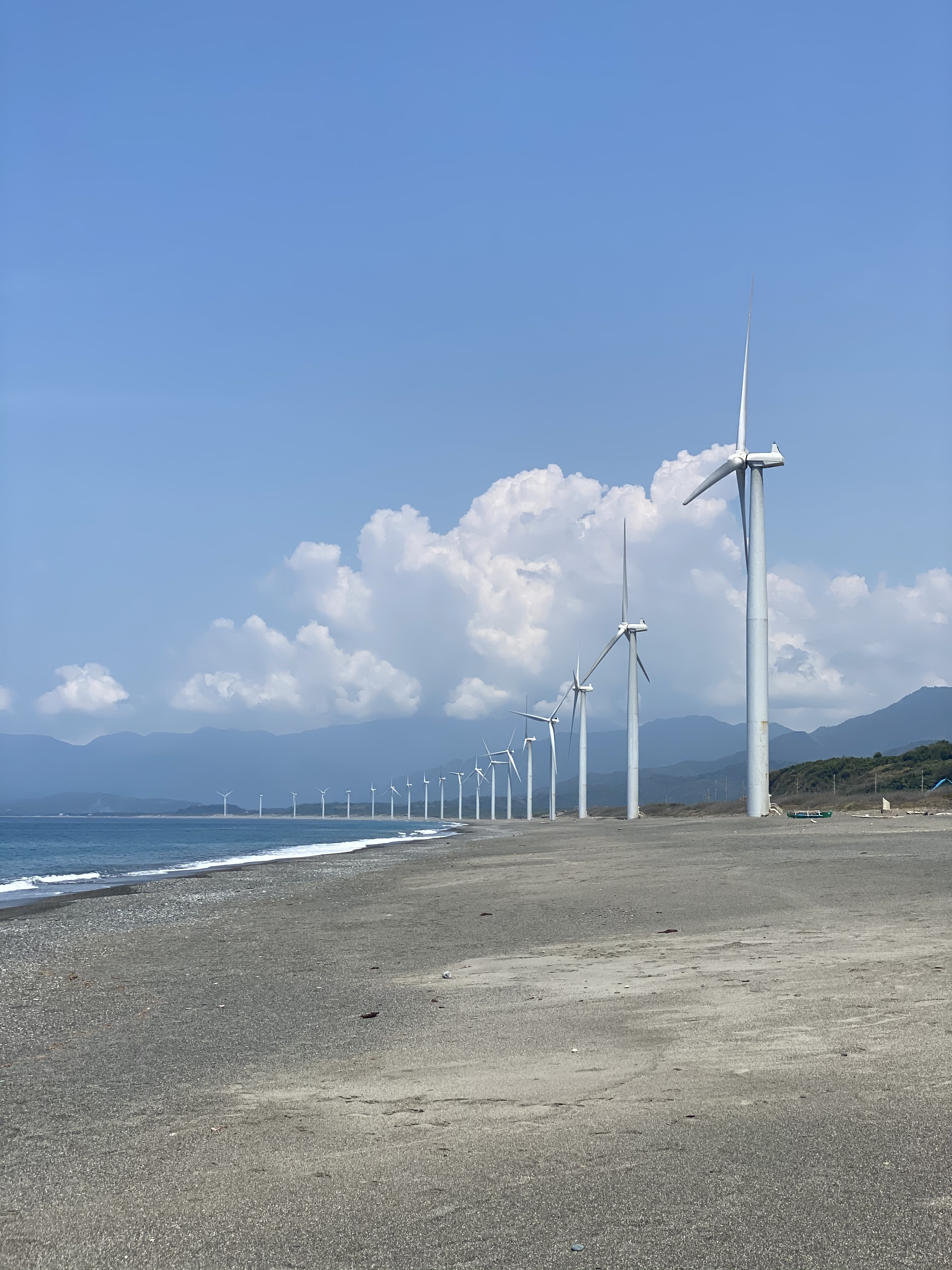
Burgos Wind Farm. It is currently the largest wind farm in the Philippines, providing 150MW of power to residents of Burgos, Ilocos Norte.

Wind power in the Philippines accounts for a total of 443MW as of 2020 according to the Department of Energy, covering about 1.6% of the country's total installed capacity for both renewable and non-renewable energy sources. When it comes to existing renewable energy sources in the country (i.e., geothermal, hydropower, biomass, solar, and wind), wind power has a total share of approximately 5.4%. Despite currently being a small contributor to the country's energy mix, wind power installations have increased from 33MW in 2012-2013 to 337MW in 2014, 427MW in 2015-2018, and 443MW in 2019-2021. Moreover, the Department of Energy's National Renewable Energy Plan (NREP) 2020-2040 aims to commission 2,345MW of total wind power capacity by 2030. There has been a setback, however, as the wind power industry was moderately affected by COVID, particularly in the import of wind turbines. Due to this, several projects such as the Aklan onshore wind project got delayed. To further drive the wind energy sector in the country, an increased demand for renewable energy, greater government commitments, and reduced wind power tariff are needed.

==== Solar energy ====
In 2015, three solar farms were constructed in the Philippines. The Philippines receives over 7kWh per square meter per day during its peak month of April and lowest at 3kWh per square meter per day during its off-peak month of December as observed by Schadow1 Expeditions in 33 cities of the country. Given the country's geographic location advantage and the potential for generating electricity from solar, the solar energy is expected to increase from the current 1.2% of 23 GW to at least 3.5% of 43 GW capacity by 2040. As of 2024, the Philippines had surpassed 2,500 MW of installed solar capacity, based on official Department of Energy statistics.

== Power transmission ==
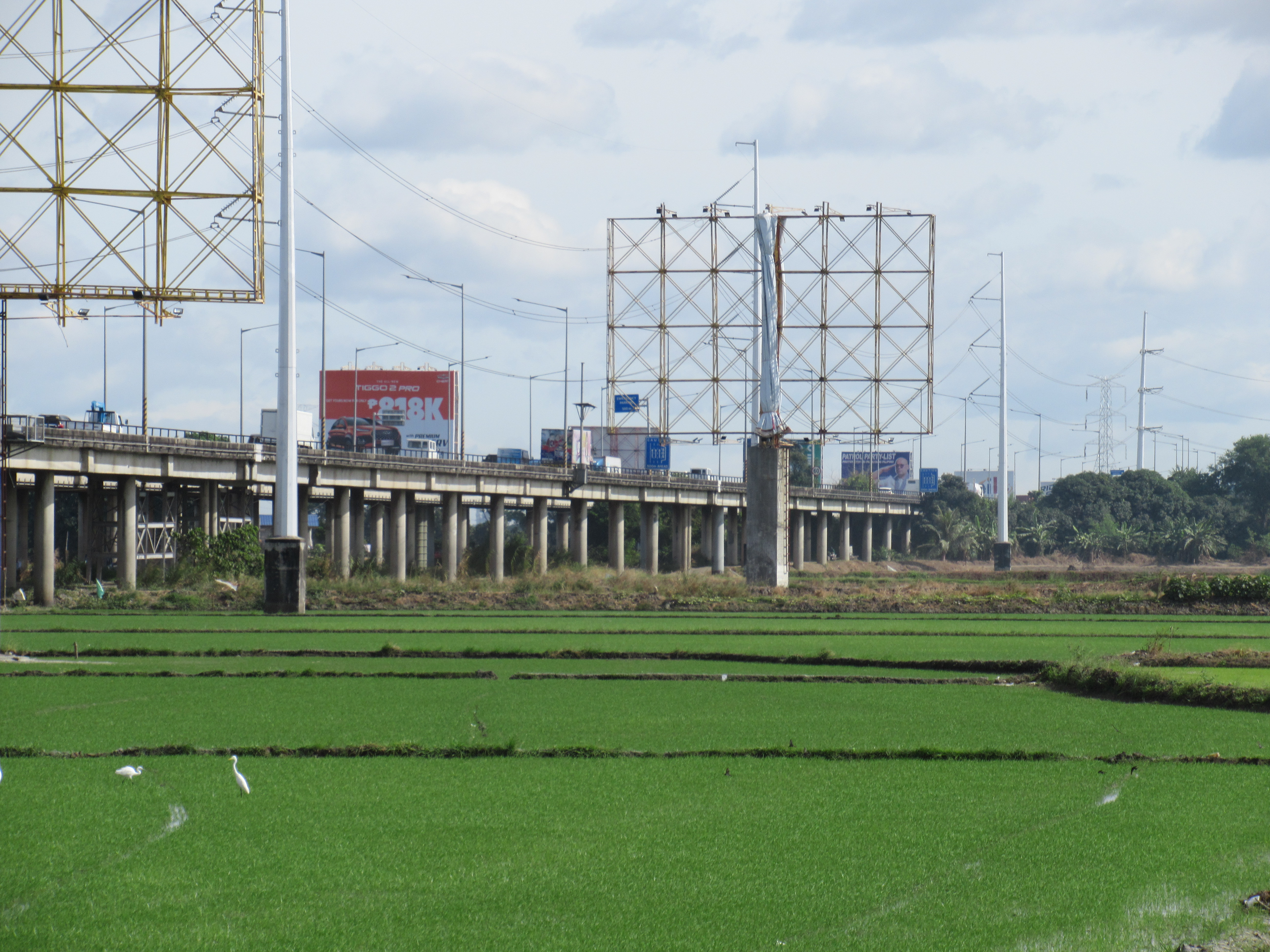
Steel poles of Hermosa–Duhat–Balintawak 230,000 volt transmission line along Candaba Viaduct of North Luzon Expressway (NLEx) in Apalit, Pampanga. The Balsik–Marilao–San Jose segment of Balsik–Marilao–San Jose–Tayabas–Pagbilao 500,000 volt transmission line is seen where it intersects with the said 230,000 volt line at the Pampanga–Bulacan boundary within the viaduct.

Power transmission in the Philippines is a common carrier business (i.e. regulated by the government, serves its franchise area without discrimination, responsible for any losses incurred during delivery). It is regulated by the ERC who has rate-making powers and the final say in the valuation of transmission assets. Pursuant to the Electric Power Industry Reform Act (EPIRA) and the Transmission Development Plan or TDP, maintenance and operations of the nationwide transmission system was subjected to competitive public bidding conducted by the Power Sector Assets and Liabilities Management (PSALM).

=== Grids ===
The Philippine transmission system is composed of three grids, the Luzon Grid, Visayas Grid, and Mindanao Grid. One characteristic of the grids is that most bulk generation sites are found far from the load centers, necessitating use of long-distance transmission lines. Some power lines of the Luzon Grid connect to or are located within Metro Manila which is its load center such as the overhead Sucat–Araneta–Balintawak (commissioned in 2000), the Duhat–Balintawak segment of Hermosa–Duhat–Balintawak (commissioned in June 1994), San Jose–Balintawak (lines 1–3), Biñan–Muntinlupa, and Dasmariñas–Las Piñas (commissioned on November 30, 2001) transmission lines.

The Luzon Grid has also a network of 500,000 volt transmission lines since 1994 thus the 500,000 volt voltage level is the highest operating voltage of the Luzon Grid as well as the Philippine power grid since the said year, with the first 500,000 volt line to be constructed is the San Jose–Tayabas–Naga transmission line which started its construction in 1982 and completed in 1994.

Through the HVDC Leyte-Luzon which is a high voltage direct current transmission line and submarine cable with a transfer capacity of 440 MW between Naga and Ormoc, the Luzon Grid is interconnected with the Visayas Grid. The Visayas Grid is composed of five small grids (sub-grid) connected with submarine cables, but arranged in a radial configuration, that may disconnect one sub-grid in case a fault develop on one submarine cable interconnection. The Mindanao Grid is composed of 138,000 volt lines for long-distance transmission, and primarily relies on hydropower, usually from Agus Hydroelectric Power Plant in Iligan and Pulangi IV Hydroelectric Power Plant in Bukidnon.

The National Grid Corporation of the Philippines placed proposals for submarine cable links between Visayas and Mindanao, to unify the three principal grids, and between off-grid Mindoro and Luzon, to increase power reliability in the off-grid island . While the three main grids encompass each island group, many islands still remain off-grid, relying on localized power plants or power barges for supply.

==== Resiliency and security ====
The Philippines transmission grids are prone to natural disasters, aging and outside factors that causes the steel and wood towers to corrode or decay, and grid security is compromised by squatters and insurgent groups. Squatters, or "informal settlers", pose a danger to transmission lines and a hindrance to line maintenance, especially in Metro Manila. The Mindanao Grid is prone to sabotage, led by insurgent groups and unknown assailants, and many transmission towers have been damaged or collapsed from consecutive bombings, that may cause a cascading failure of the grid.

Damage to several power plants and a transmission line after the April 2017 earthquake swarm in Batangas reflected the need of power resiliency, resulting the Department of Energy to draft a policy to improve power supply resiliency.

Also, most transmission infrastructure are affected by outside factors and aging, showing their signs of corrosion as time goes by which necessitated the need to paint the steel poles, lattice towers, and portal towers with either grey or a shinier aluminum paint to provide protection from factors that cause the structures to corrode and extend their service lifespan. Wood poles remain in use, especially in the 69,000 volt systems, but are prone to decay and natural disasters, especially typhoons and earthquakes, and many are being replaced with more stable steel or concrete poles or a newer wood pole in some places.

==== History and ownership ====
Operations and maintenance of the Philippine power grid and its associated assets and facilities were originally operated and maintained by the Philippine government (through National Power Corporation (NAPOCOR/NPC) and National Transmission Corporation (TransCo) from November 3, 1936 to January 15, 2009 for 72 years and 2 months.

From November 3, 1936 to March 1, 2003, NAPOCOR/NPC owned, operated, and maintained the transmission grid and its related assets and facilities.

Due to the implementation of Electric Power Industry Reform Act (EPIRA) or Republic Act 9136 one year and nine months earlier on June 8, 2001 signed by President Gloria Macapagal Arroyo which resulted in the creation of another government-owned corporation TransCo 18 days after the law was approved on June 26, 2001, NAPOCOR/NPC took over the operations, maintenance, and ownership of the power grid to TransCo on March 1, 2003 as mandated on RA 9136 or EPIRA that organized the industry into four sectors: generation, transmission, distribution, and supply. TransCo operated, maintained, and made eminent domain to the grid from March 1, 2003 to January 15, 2009.

Through the implementation of RA 9511 and a congressional franchise of 25 years renewable for another 25 years for a total of 50 years, TransCo turned over the operations, maintenance, and eminent domain of the power grid to the privately owned National Grid Corporation of the Philippines (NGCP) on January 15, 2009 also during the Arroyo administration, with the latter operated and maintained the grid since the said date of January 2009, transferring them from government to a private sector.

Since January 15, 2009, operations, maintenance, and eminent domain of the grid is in the private sector where it is being operated and maintained by the National Grid Corporation of the Philippines (NGCP), with rights-of-ways (ROWs) or grid portions, and components both entirely new or secondhand that abandoned their pre-concession period original designation or usage and government ownership (NAPOCOR/NPC and TransCo-era) and their exact lands or locations acquired and designated from the said date will have their temporary NGCP private ownership, as provided on NGCP's franchise (Republic Act 9511) and concession agreement where it is authorized to exercise the right of eminent domain necessary for the construction, expansion, and efficient maintenance and operation of the transmission system and grid and the efficient operation and maintenance of the subtransmission systems which have not yet been disposed by TransCo thus NGCP acts as the temporary owner of them and they will be transferred to TransCo once the NGCP concession period ends or is revoked, applying the build–own–operate–transfer (BOOT) model.

Those before the turnover date, however, remains with the national government through TransCo as its one mandate to handle all existing cases, including right-of-way and claims which accrued prior to the transfer of power grid to NGCP, and to comply with the former's concession agreement with NGCP regarding their ownership. Portions with acquisition and designation made before the turnover to TransCo on March 1, 2003 are titled under or using the name of NAPOCOR/NPC with continued and transferred ownership by TransCo. As such, portions of the grid before the said date of January 2009 are handled by TransCo's Right of Way and Legal Group, and NGCP only has granted the right to operate, maintain and construct them where build-operate-transfer (BOT) or build-lease-transfer (BLT) are applied without giving temporary private ownership.

As such, the grid currently has temporary dual or separated government and private ownership since the handover where TransCo owns the pre-privatization era portions while NGCP during its operational period.

== Power distribution ==
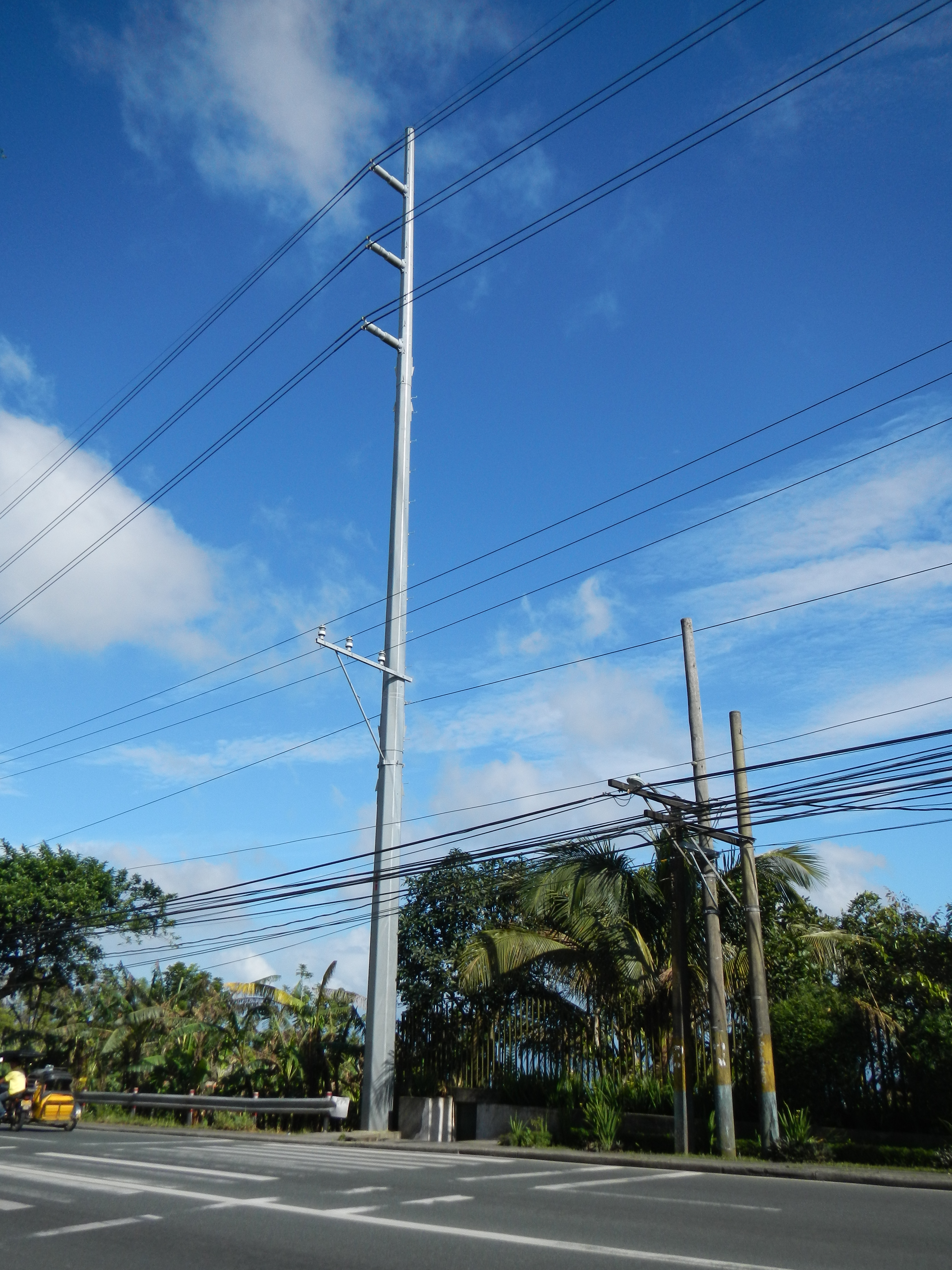
Electricity line post in Tagaytay

The circulation of electricity to end-users is a controlled common carrier business requiring a national franchise. The power to grant national franchises is exclusively vested to the Congress of the Philippines. Distribution of electric power to all end-users or consumers of electricity may be handled by private distribution utilities, cooperatives, local government units presently undertaking this function and other duly authorized entities, under the regulation of the ERC.

A distribution utility has the task to provide distribution services and connections to its system for any end-user within its franchise area, as there are different distribution utilities available for different areas, consistent with the distribution code. They are required to provide open and non-discriminatory access to its distribution system to all users.

Retail rates charged by distribution utilities are subject to regulation of the ERC under the principle of full recovery. Under full recovery, distribution utilities subdivide their retail rate into two distinct categories, namely pass through charges and wheeling charges. Pass through charge follows the principle of full economic recovery where a distribution utility may pass on all the charges it incurred in the distribution of power such as the price of the power, transmission charge, systems loss charge, etc. to its customers. The wheeling charge is an additional premium charged to the customer akin to a mark-up on the cost of power acquired by the distribution utility. The wheeling charge follows the principle of reasonable return on base (RORB) which allows the distribution utility to operate viably as determined by the ERC.

According to the National Electrification Administration (NEA), the distribution sector is composed of 119 electric cooperatives, 16 privately owned utilities and six local government-owned utilities as of 2009. These distribution utilities may acquire electricity from generation companies through Power Supply Agreements (PSA) or the Philippine Wholesale Electricity Spot Market (WESM), when certified as the distribution of electricity requires a national franchise, for distribution to residential, commercial, industrial and other users. NEA, the government agency in charge of implementing programs to reinforce the technical capability and financial viability of rural electric cooperatives, may act as guarantor for purchases of electricity in the WESM by any electric cooperative or small distribution utility to support their credit standing. These distribution utilities can either be a Direct WESM member or an Indirect WESM member. Direct WESM members may trade (i.e. buy) electricity directly from the WESM and pay it at the prevailing spot price. These Direct Members are required to provide security deposit. Indirect WESM members can trade through a generation company and are not required to provide security deposit.

Currently, Meralco is the Philippines' largest distribution utility with a franchise area of 9,337 square kilometers covering Metro Manila, the entire provinces of Bulacan, Rizal and Cavite, parts of the provinces of Laguna, Quezon and Batangas, and 17 barangays in Pampanga. The franchise area is home to 23 million people, roughly a quarter of the entire Philippine population of 89 million.

Power distribution outside the Meralco coverage area is handled by private distribution utilities and electric cooperatives.

=== Electric Cooperatives ===
Electric Cooperatives (ECs) are entities owned by the member-consumers within the vicinity covered by the said entity. These are controlled by a board of directors elected by member-consumers and their management and operations supervised by the National Electrification Administration. As of 2012, there are 121 coops recognized by the NEA and ERC.

=== Private Distribution Utilities (PDUs) ===
Private Distribution Utilities are electric distribution companies that are owned by private entities. As of 2025, there are 30 private-investor owned electric distribution companies in the Philippines.

- AEC - Angeles Electric Corporation
- ANECO - Agusan del Norte Electric Cooperative, Inc.
- BELS - Bauan Electric Light System
- BEZ - Balamban Enerzone Corporation
- BLCI - Bohol Light Co., Inc.
- BOHECO - Bohol Electric Company
- CEDC - Clark Electric Distribution Corporation
- CELCO - Camotes Island Electric
- CELCOR - Cabanatuan Electric Corporation
- CEPALCO - Cagayan Electric Power and Light Co., Inc.
- COLIGHT - Cotabato Light and Power Company, Inc.
- DECORP - Dagupan Electric Corporation
- DLPC - Davao Light and Power Company, Inc.
- FICELCO - First Catanduanes Electric Cooperative, Inc.
- IEC - Ibaan Electric Corporation
- ILPI - Iligan Light & Power, Inc.
- LEZ - Lima Enerzone Corporation
- LUECO - La Union Electric Company, Inc.
- MARELCO - Marinduque Electric Cooperative, Inc.
- MEPC - MORE Electric and Power Corporation
- MECO - Mactan Electric Company, Inc.
- MEZ - Mactan Enerzone Corporation
- Meralco - Manila Electric Company
- PECO - Panay Electric Co., Inc.
- SFELAPCO - San Fernando Electric Light and Power Co., Inc.
- SCPC - Shin Clark Power Corporation
- SEZ - Subic Enerzone Corporation
- SURNECO - Surigao Del Norte Electric Cooperative, Inc.
- TEI - Tarlac Electric, Inc.
- VECO - Visayan Electric Company, Inc.

=== Municipal utility (MU) ===
MUs are entities that are owned by the local government. The local government officials, who are elected by the end-users within the municipality, regulates, controls, and manages the utilities. As of 2012, only one municipal utility is recognized by the ERC: Olongapo City.

== Supply sector ==
The supply sector are suppliers of electricity to the contestable market. Pursuant to EPIRA, the implementation of retail competition and open access allows for the establishment of a contestable market. The contestable market can be serviced by any interested party even without a national franchise. However, they must be licensed by the ERC. As the supply sector is not considered a public utility activity, the ERC does not regulate rate-making. However, the ERC still monitors and determines anti-competitive behavior.

The contestable market are end-users with an average monthly peak demand of 750 kilowatts. The ERC plans to reduce this level until it reaches average household demand.

=== Power supply shortage (2014-2015) ===
According to several articles and news sites, the Philippines faced a power supply shortage leading to rolling blackouts across the country during the years 2014–2015. In late 2014, President Aquino requested the Congress to pass a resolution giving him emergency power to allow the government to provide additional supply and prevent a power shortage in 2015. However, the passing of the resolution was delayed and Aquino admitted that his original plan was no longer feasible. His proposal was tweaked and the Interruptible Load Program (ILP) was recommended for use in the Luzon power grid instead. The ILP essentially enrolls large establishments, including government owned and controlled corporations, with their own generators to voluntarily disconnect from the main grid and switch to their generators instead when a power outage was predicted. Their rationale was that a power outage would cause these establishments to run on generators anyway so it is more beneficial for them to run their generators in an organized fashion.

=== Malampaya shortage ===
According to several articles such as from Rappler, the Malampaya gas facility shortage is responsible for 40-45 percent of Luzon's grid in terms of electricity consumption. Glitches and pipe leaks play a big role in the shortage of electricity as it affects the gas flow restriction for safe operations in the deep water gas-to-power project. The restrictions placed in the Malampaya gas supply greatly impacts the power reserves and the power consumption of the end-users or the households in the Philippines. Although the facility can be restored to normal operations, there never is an assurance of the incident not happening again. There is no guarantee that the Malampaya gas facility will operate perfectly which is why it is advised to practice energy efficiency and conservation mainly because of power shortage and rate hikes.

=== National Power Corporation ===
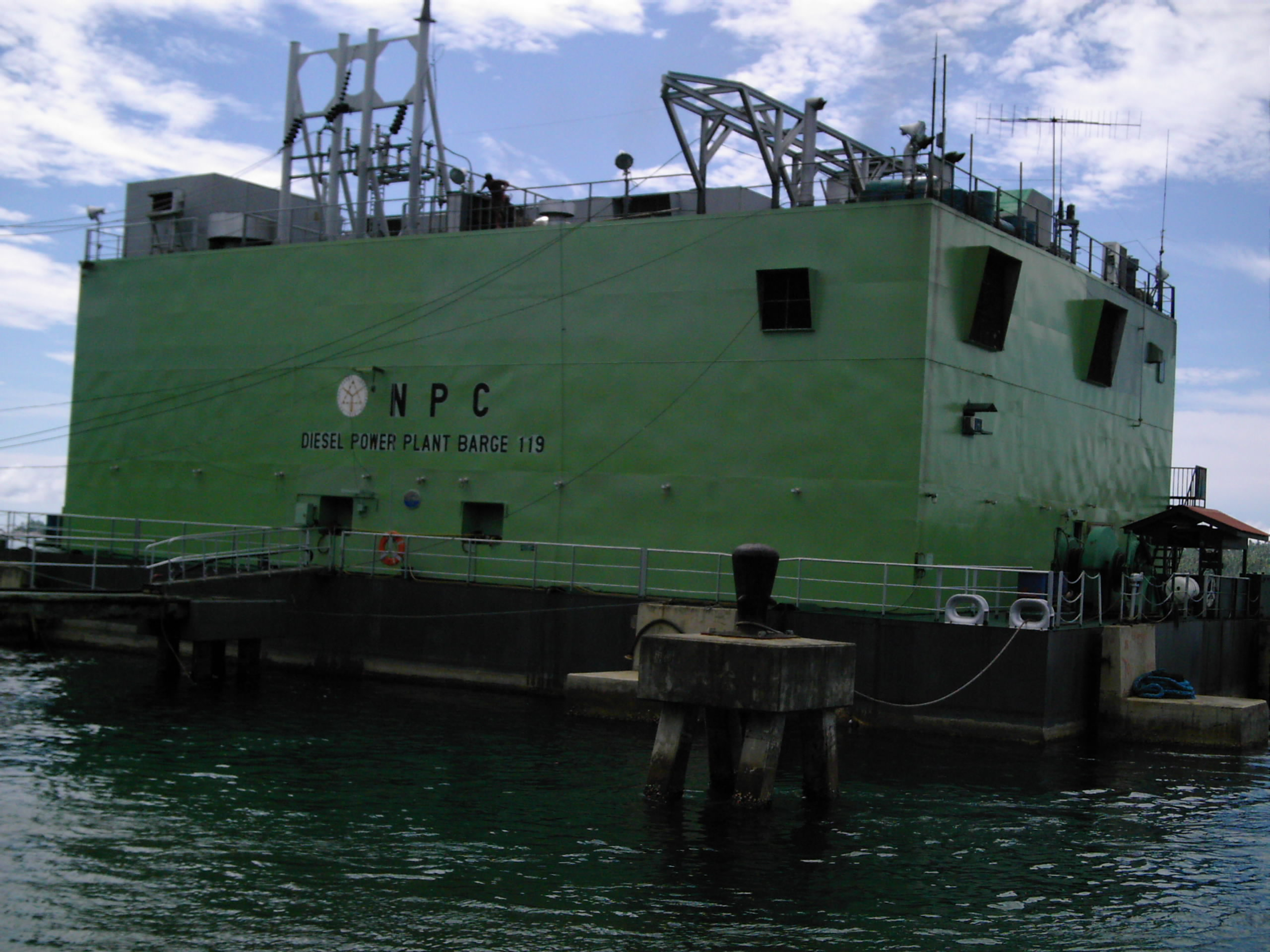
NAPOCOR power barge No. 119 in Isabela, Basilan

According to several articles, EPIRA introduced reforms, including the restructuring of the power sector leaving a heavy dent on the states budget because of the high cost of maintenance. Menandro Abanes, a researcher on Southeast Asian issues, said, "To meet the predicted demand, 5,000 megawatts was needed, translating to necessary government infusion of approximately P38 billion annually into the development of the power industry to curb the shortfall, without which another power crisis reminiscent of the 1980s and 1990s was expected." The government, however, was unable to infuse funds into because of a budget deficit that hit P145 billion at the time. Furthermore, by December 2000, NPC has accumulated a debt of 900 billion pesos, which at that time was nearly half the government's total debt of 2.179 trillion pesos. To resolve the issue, the government ignored other options and chose to rely on the option of privatization of the power industry.

One of the solutions implemented by the government is the inclusion of the universal charge in the end consumer's bill. The universal charge is used to pay part of the stranded costs of the NPC. Stranded costs are incurred when the selling price of a good is less than the cost to produce it, this usually results in a net loss to the company. The universal charge is also used to pay part of the NPC's long term debt obligations.

Philippine Wholesale Electricity Spot Market (WESM)

The WESM was developed in order to establish a competitive, efficient, transparent and reliable market for electricity where a level playing field exists among WESM Participants and prices are governed as far as practicable by commercial and market forces. The WESM was created by virtue of Section 30 of Republic Act No. 9136, otherwise known as the Electric Power Industry Reform Act (EPIRA) of 2001. WESM is where the generators sell their excess capacities not covered by contracts and where the customers buy additional capacities on top of their contracts. WESM encourages efficiency of the electricity supply through competition. It currently operates in Luzon and Visayas. However, plans are underway to operate it also in Mindanao. WESM is a precursor in the implementation of the Retail Competition and Open Access (RCOA).

Trading in the WESM is bounded by the WESM Rules. The WESM Rules set forth the trading mechanism and the Price Determination Methodology which is approved by the ERC. WESM trading happens every hour 24x7. All the Generators in Luzon and Visayas submit offers (MW quantity and corresponding price) to be scheduled and thereby provide electricity to the Grid. The offers are ranked from the cheapest to the most expensive offer until the forecasted demand for the hour by the Independent Market Operator (IMO) is met. Where the intersection of supply and demand meets, then that becomes the system marginal price (SMP). However, the prices are further adjusted for losses or congestion price for each location in the Grid represented by a market trading node (MTN). This price is what is known as the Locational Marginal Price (LMP). At the end of the month, all the hourly schedules of the trading participants, measured through their electricity meters, are accounted for, for settlement. The generators, on a daily basis, submits to the IMO the bilateral contract quantity (BCQ) such that the IMO will know how much of the electricity volume will be settled based on the spot price and how much BCQ volume will be netted out of the market settlement. This BCQ volume will then be settled by the Genco and his counterparty DU based on the ERC approved contract price.

The WESM is currently operated by the Independent Electricity Market Operator of the Philippines (IEMOP). IEMOP is responsible for WESM operations by performing the following functions:

- Registers WESM participants, maintains and publishes a registry of the registry of WESM participants

- Manages the optimization engine

- Prepares the dispatch schedules to be transmitted to the System Operator (SO), including the schedules resulting from the Week Ahead Projection (WAP), the Day Ahead Projection (DAP), the ex-ante (Real-Time Dispatch or RTD), and the real-time ex-post (RTX)

- Manages the Market Management System (MMS), which is the infrastructure that supports the WESM, and the ancillary IS/IT facilities used for WESM operations

- Manages access to the WESM website and ensures the operation of all interfaces across all sub-systems.

- Prepares daily market reports and manages the historical database

- Conducts market evaluations and studies for use of the WESM participants

- Handles billing and settlements, which includes calculation of trading amounts and preparation of settlement statements

- Performs accounts management, handling of settlement disputes, and metering data processing, editing and validation for settlement purposes

- Manages the WESM electronic fund transfer facility

- Monitors the sufficiency of the WESM participants' prudential requirements

- Offers other WESM participant services, including training and help desk services

Central to WESM operations is the Market Management System (MMS), the infrastructure that supports the WESM. The MMS encompasses all the functionalities needed to operate it. It uses state of the art technology and interfaces with different systems including the WESM Billing and Settlement System (WBSS), an internal market system for bilateral contract declaration and settlements, the energy management system (EMS) of the System Operator, and that of the Metering Service Providers, Electronic Fund Transfer Facility Provider, as well as the Trading Participants and other WESM members.

After completion of the ongoing software audit, IEMOP will shift to the New Market Management System (NMMS), which it procured in July 2015 to implement the enhanced WESM design. The NMMS will allow for the shorter trading interval of five minutes and for a more efficient and reliable scheduling and pricing in the market. The NMMS will be complemented by other market systems that IEMOP will deploy, such as the Central Registration and Settlement System (CRSS) and Accounts Management System (AMS) for greater efficiency and transparency in operating the WESM.

IEMOP also provides access to market information (Market Data), Participant List, System Operations Reports. It publishes regular reports relevant to the results of the commercial operations of WESM in Luzon and Visayas, as well as other market-related reports such as the Daily Market Update, Significant Variations Report, Weekly and Monthly Summary Reports, Metering Service Providers (MSP) Performance Report, Variable Renewable Energy (VRE) Forecast Performance Report, the Market Network Model, and Merit Order Table, among others.

IEMOP facilitates the fulfilment of one of EPIRA's main goals – competition at the retail level

The reforms instituted in Republic Act No. 9136 culminate in Retail Competition and Open Access (RCOA). RCOA grants electricity end-users, starting with those having demands of 1 MW or higher, the power of choice of electricity supplier. With such power of choice, they can contract with retail electricity suppliers (RES) rather than be supplied by distribution utilities as part of the captive market. With more and more retail electricity suppliers signifying interest in serving these contestable customers and as the contestability threshold is further lowered from 1 MW to 750 kW, at which level aggregation will already be allowed, and thereafter further lowered to 500 kW, robust competition will be sustained and enhanced, both at the retail and wholesale levels.

== See also ==
- Energy in the Philippines
- List of power plants in the Philippines
- Renewable energy in the Philippines
- Wind power in the Philippines
- Geothermal power in the Philippines
- Department of Energy (Philippines)
- National Electrification Administration
- National Power Corporation
- National Transmission Corporation
- National Grid Corporation of the Philippines
