= National Electrification Administration =

Filipino government program to increase energy access

- Pambansang Pangasiwaan sa Elektripikasyon

Agency overview
- Formed: July 28, 1969; 57 years ago
- Headquarters: 57 NIA Road, National Government Center, Diliman, Quezon City 1100, Metro Manila, Philippines
- Agency executive: Antonio Mariano C. Almeda, Administrator
- Parent department: Department of Energy
- Website: www.nea.gov.ph

The National Electrification Administration (NEA; Filipino: Pambansang Pangasiwaan sa Elektripikasyon) is a government-owned and controlled corporation (GOCC) attached to the Department of Energy of the Philippines tasked in the full implementation of the rural electrification program (REP) and reinforce the technical capability and financial viability of the 121 rural electric cooperatives (ECs).

Formerly located at the D&E and CDC Buildings, 1050 Quezon Avenue, Paligsahan, their office is now inside Triangle Park at the National Government Center in Quezon City.

== History ==
General Pedro Gallarza Diaz Dumol is considered to be the "Father of Rural Electrification (in the Philippines)" when approximately 2,700,000 connections had been made from zero when he moved in as chief of the National Electrification Administration until his retirement in 1986.

One of the thrusts of the previous NEA leadership is to intensify the implementation of the Sitio Electrification Program (SEP) Phase 2 and the Barangay Line Enhancement Program (BLEP).

=== Creation ===
The Electrification Administration was initially created and established through Republic Act 2717 without executive approval on June 19, 1960, in order to promote and accelerate the agricultural and industrial development of the Philippines. The agency was headed by an Administrator (appointed by the president with the consent of the COA or commission of appointments) for a term of ten years, and two deputy administrators.

The agency maintains a revolving fund consisting of ₱5 million appropriated annually starting fiscal year 1961 until 1965, other fund or assets received from or out of Japanese reparations and loans obtained under the same. Out of this fund, the administration was authorized and empowered to make loans to local governments, electric consumers cooperative associations and Filipino electric franchise holders for the purpose of financing the construction and operation of generating plants, electric transmission and distribution lines or systems for the furnishing of electric energy, particularly in remote areas.

=== Reorganization of electrification administration and electric cooperatives (ECs) ===
Nine years after the creation of Electrification Administration, a National or State policy of total electrification on an area (Regional Boundaries and Special City Energy Allotment) coverage service basis, secondly, to set up Cooperatives for the distribution of power, and to determine privately owned (Fuel or Coal Powered Electricity Utilities (e.g. Blackstone Electric) and other local public utilities (e.g. Concrete Electric Utility Pole) which should be permitted to remain in operation, was declared through Republic Act 6038 approved on July 28, 1969, and signed (on August 4, 1969) by then President Ferdinand Edralin Marcos, including Presidential Decree No. 40 and Letter of Instruction No. 38, dated November 7, 1972, effectively repealing Republic Act 2717.

The board of administrators were introduced in the agency, which shall be composed of a chairman and four members, one of whom shall be the administrator as ex-officio member of the board and chief executive officer (CEO) of NEA. General Pedro Gallarza Diaz Dumol became the administrator after being offered the post by then executive secretary Alejandro Melchor.

Chapter III of this law also called for the organization, promotion and development of cooperative non-stock, non-profit membership corporations and electric cooperative corporations (ECs) formed or registered under Republic Act 2023 or the Non-Agricultural Co-operative Act for the distribution of power in the countryside.

Additional appropriations to the revolving fund consisted of ₱20 million (but not limited as to the amount Congress may further appropriate) annually starting fiscal year 1970 until 1979, proceeds to the share of the National Government in all franchise taxes paid by electric service entities, and continuing funds or physical assets received from or out of Japanese reparations.

=== NEA Decree and franchising powers ===
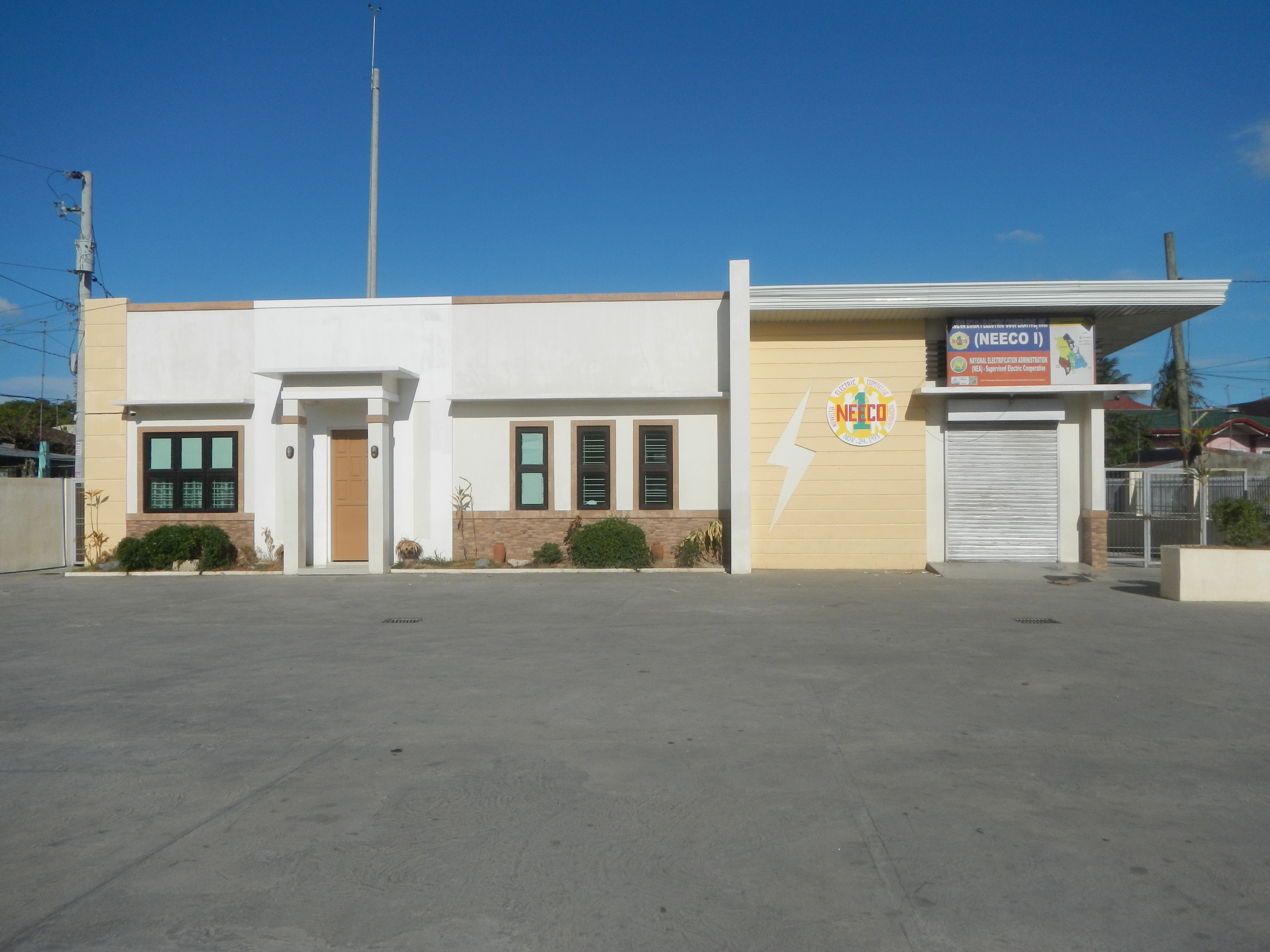
NEECO, Cabiao

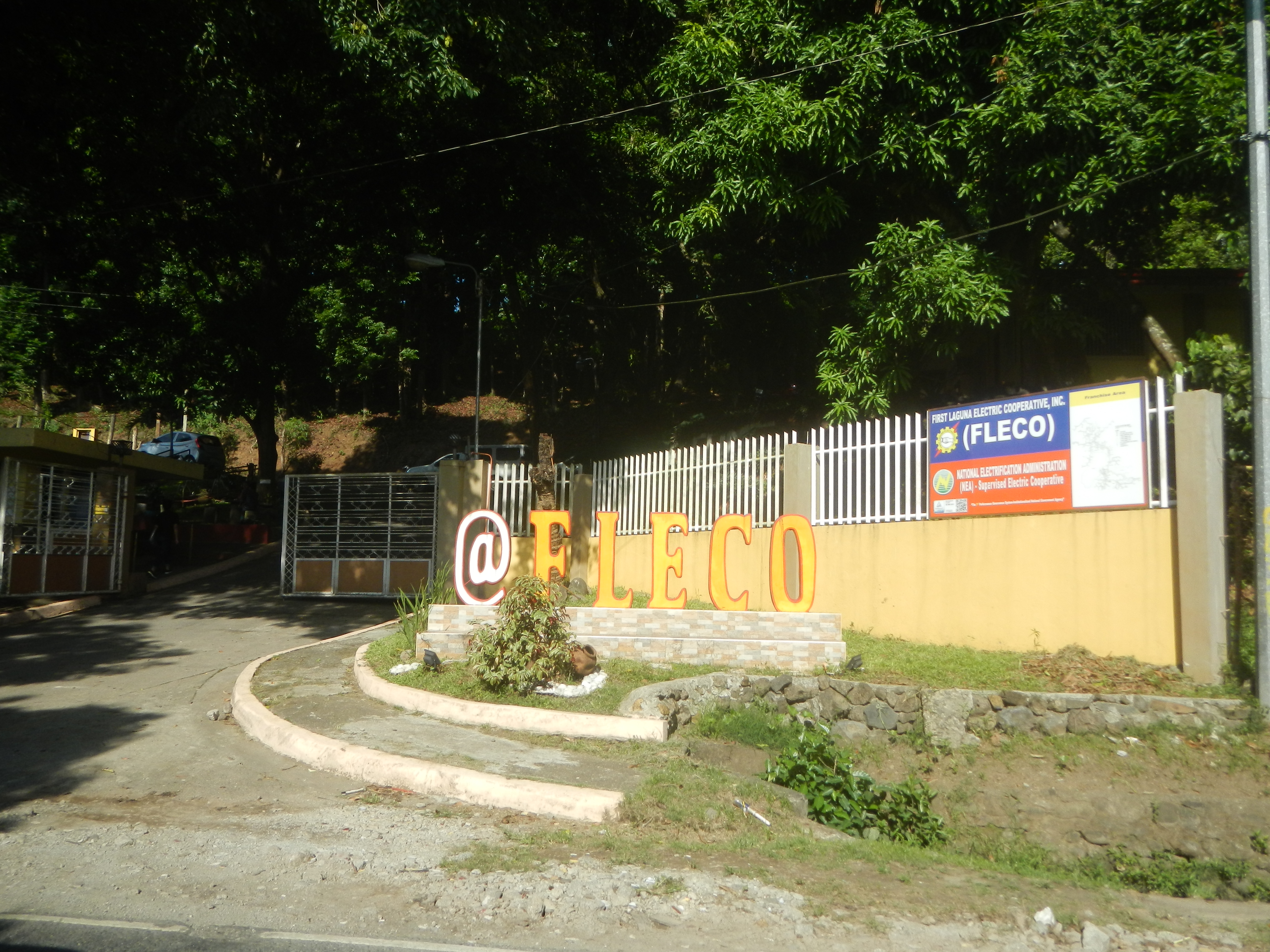
FLECO, Lumban, Laguna

On August 6, 1973, the National Electrification Administration through Presidential Decree No. 269 was converted into a corporation, wholly owned and controlled by the Philippine government under the supervision of the Office of the President. Possessed with borrowing authority and corporate powers, the authorized capital stock of NEA was pegged at ₱1 billion divided into ten million shares having a par value of one hundred (₱100) pesos each. Six years later, Presidential Decree No. 1645 increased the authorized capital stock by ₱4 billion with an additional forty million shares.

Sections 42 and 43, Chapter IV of the NEA decree effectively repealed the power to grant "electric system" franchises from the municipal, city and provincial governments in favor of the NEA. As such, the corporation will also receive from electric cooperatives (ECs) all articles of incorporation, amendments, consolidation, merger, conversion and dissolution, and all certificates of changes in the location of principal offices and of elections to dissolve.

The composition of the board of administrators (BOA) was retained, composed of a chairman and four members appointed by the president, one of whom shall be the administrator as ex-officio member of the board with a term of six years. The BOA shall administer, acting as a commission, all the provisions found on Chapter IV of the NEA decree.

=== Electric Power Industry Reform Act of 2001 (EPIRA) ===
Republic Act 9136 or the “Electric Power Industry Reform Act of 2001” (EPIRA) effectively condoned all outstanding financial obligations of Electric Cooperatives (ECs) to NEA and other government agencies (incurred for the purpose of financing the Rural Electrification program [REP]) and was assumed by the Power Sector Assets and Liabilities Management Corporation (PSALM).

Then President Gloria Macapagal Arroyo also issued Executive Order 119 ordering the reorganization of NEA to bring down the power rates considerably. The reorganization was approved and implemented by the Department of Energy (DOE) and Department of Budget and Management (DBM).

=== Electric cooperatives (ECs) between NEA and CDA ===
The enactment of Republic Act 6939 creating the Cooperative Development Authority (CDA) as amended by Republic Act 9520 or the Philippine Cooperative Code of 2008 may have allowed Electric Cooperatives (ECs) to qualify for certain tax exemptions or pay lower taxes but also raised questions on NEA's jurisdiction over ECs.

Arguments raised as follows: 1) The ECs don't have autonomy and independence and democratic control of member-consumers because NEA appoints the General Manager who may ignore policy decisions of the General Assembly-elected members of the board of directors. 2) The transfer of all outstanding obligations of ECs from NEA to PSALM through the EPIRA law extinguished the basis of the regulatory and supervisory powers of NEA, i.e. loans previously extended.

=== National Electrification Administration Reform Act of 2013 and the Electric Cooperatives (ECs) ===
When Republic Act 10531 was enacted on February 4, 2013, it declared a threefold National or State policy: First, to empower and strengthen the NEA; Second, to empower and enable Electric Cooperatives (ECs) to cope with the changes brought about by the EPIRA law; and Third, to promote the sustainable development in the rural areas through rural electrification.

This law may as well be considered as curative statute that is intended to address the impact of a restructured electric power industry under the EPIRA on Electric Cooperatives (ECs), which has not been fully addressed by the Philippine Cooperative Code of 2008.

=== From Administration to Authority ===
In some June 2017 newspaper articles, then Administrator Masongsong was quoted as saying there's a move to amend the NEA Charter to allow it to regulate Electric Cooperatives (ECs) aside from monitoring and supervision, to be unofficially named National Electrification Authority. The policy change seeks to allow NEA to propose policies and legislation to improve the power industry and expand the NEA's mandate to cover other electricity distribution utilities like private investors owned utilities and private distribution utilities.

== Electrification ==
Electrification, one of the several form of energization, refers to the ratio of entities with active electric connection within a category (e.g. cities, barangays, sitios, puroks, households, etc) out of the total number of entities within that category. For example, all of the 1,475 cities have electricity connection to at least one house or business, thus each city is electrified, i.e. 100% electrification ratio at city level.

Percentage	2016	To date	Potential	Division
100.00%	1,475	1,475	1,475	Cities/Municipalities
99.97%	36,051	36,051	36,061	Barangays
89.82%	118,693	131,315	146,191	Sitios
87.73%	11,724,640	13,184,523	15,028,900	Households

New power connections as of June 30, 2018.

FY 2018	H1 2018	Luzon	Visayas	Mindanao
460,000	260,224	106,898	69,784	83,542
100.00%	56.57%	23.24%	15.17%	18.16%

== Organization ==
=== List of board of administrators ===
Designation	Full Name	Term Began	Term Ended
Chairman of the Board	Secretary Alfonso G. Cusi	July 1, 2016	Incumbent
Ex-officio Member	Emmanuel P. Juaneza	October 19, 2021	Incumbent
Member	Agustin L. Maddatu	July 1, 2013	Incumbent
Member	Eugene A. Tan	March 20, 2015	Incumbent
Member	Joseph D. Khonghun	July 1, 2013	March 9, 2015*
Member	Rene M. Gonzales	May 10, 2017*	Incumbent
Member	Victor G. Chiong	May 21, 2015	May 9, 2017
Member	Wilfred L. Billena	July 1, 2011*	August 15, 2014

=== List of NEA administrators ===
Administrator	Term Began	Term Ended	President
Emmanuel P. Juaneza	October 18, 2021	Incumbent	Rodrigo Duterte
Rossan SJ. Rosero-Lee (Acting)	September 8, 2021	October 15, 2021	Rodrigo Duterte
Edgardo R. Masongsong	November 18, 2016	August 21, 2021	Rodrigo Duterte
Sonia B. San Diego (Acting)	July 1, 2016	November 17, 2016	Rodrigo Duterte
Edita S. Bueno	August 1, 2010*	June 30, 2016	Benigno Aquino III
Father Francisco G. Silva	July 1, 2004*	June 30, 2010*	Gloria Macapagal Arroyo
Manuel Luis Sanchez	January 20, 2001*	June 30, 2004*	Gloria Macapagal Arroyo
Conrado Estrella III	July 1, 1999*	January 19, 2001*	Joseph Estrada
Rodrigo Cabrera	1986*	1998*	Corazon Aquino
General Pedro Gallarza Diaz Dumol	1972*	1986*	Ferdinand Marcos

=== List of deputy administrators ===
Deputy Administrator	Current Department/Division (Effective January 2019)	Previous Department/Division
Sonia B. San Diego	Corporate Resources and Financial Services (CRFS)	Electric Cooperatives Management Services (ECMS)
Atty. Rossan SJ. Rosero-Lee	Legal Services	Special Concerns Office
Atty. Vicar Loureen G. Lofranco	Electric Cooperatives Management Services (ECMS)	Corporate Resources and Financial Services (CRFS)
Engr. Artis Nikki L. Tortola	Technical Services	Technical Services

== See also ==
- Department of Energy (Philippines)
- Electricity sector in the Philippines
- Energy in the Philippines
- Geothermal power in the Philippines
- Government of the Philippines
- List of utility cooperatives
- National Grid Corporation of the Philippines
- National Power Corporation
- National Transmission Corporation
- Renewable energy in the Philippines
- Wind power in the Philippines
