= Biñan–Muntinlupa 230kV =

High-voltage overhead power line based in the Philippines

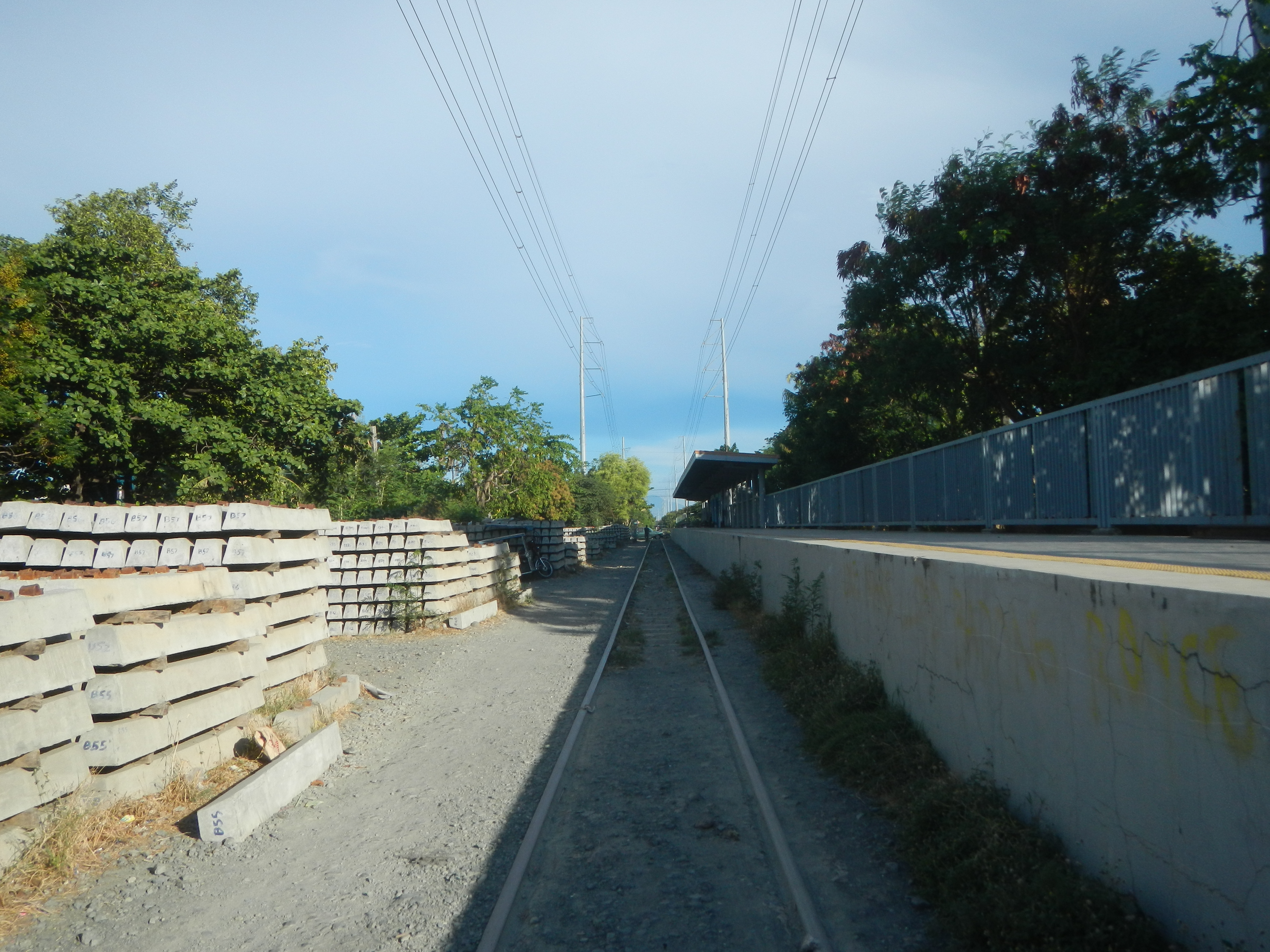
- A portion of lines 3 and 4 of the transmission line along Philippine National Railways (PNR) in San Pedro, Laguna

Location
- Country: Philippines
- Province: Laguna; Metro Manila
- Coordinates: 14°19′49″N 121°4′32″E; 14°26′40″N 121°3′9″E
- From: Biñan Substation
- To: Muntinlupa Substation

Ownership information
- Owner: see Ownership, operations, and maintenance information
- Operator: see Ownership, operations, and maintenance information

Technical information
- Type: Overhead transmission line
- Current type: HVAC
- No. of towers: 224 (172 steel poles, 51 lattice towers, 1 H-frame)
- AC voltage: 230 kV
- No. of poles: 173 (172 steel poles and 1 H-frame)
- No. of circuits: 4

The Biñan–Muntinlupa Transmission Line (abbreviated as 8LI1BIN-MUN, 8LI2BIN-MUN, 8LI3BIN-MUN, 8LI4BIN-MUN) and commonly known as Biñan–Muntilupa 230kV is a 230,000 volt, quadruple-circuit transmission line in Laguna and Metro Manila, Philippines that connects Biñan and Muntinlupa substations of National Grid Corporation of the Philippines (NGCP). It is on a one loop line from Biñan to Biñan.

== Route description ==
=== Lines 1 and 2 ===
Lines 1 and 2 of the transmission line, mostly consists of lattice towers with steel poles on certain portions, was originally commissioned by the government-owned National Power Corporation (NAPOCOR/NPC), and are located within the service area of National Grid Corporation of the Philippines (NGCP) South Luzon Operations and Maintenance (SLOM) Districts 1 (South Western Tagalog) and 2 (South Eastern Tagalog; along with lines 3 and 4). The power line crosses into PNR Metro Commuter Line, Metro Manila Skyway, and South Luzon Expressway (SLEX). It turns left, passes into residential areas, establishments, and institutions within Muntinlupa, and crosses into Don Jesus Boulevard, South Station Transport Terminal, and Alabang Viaduct.

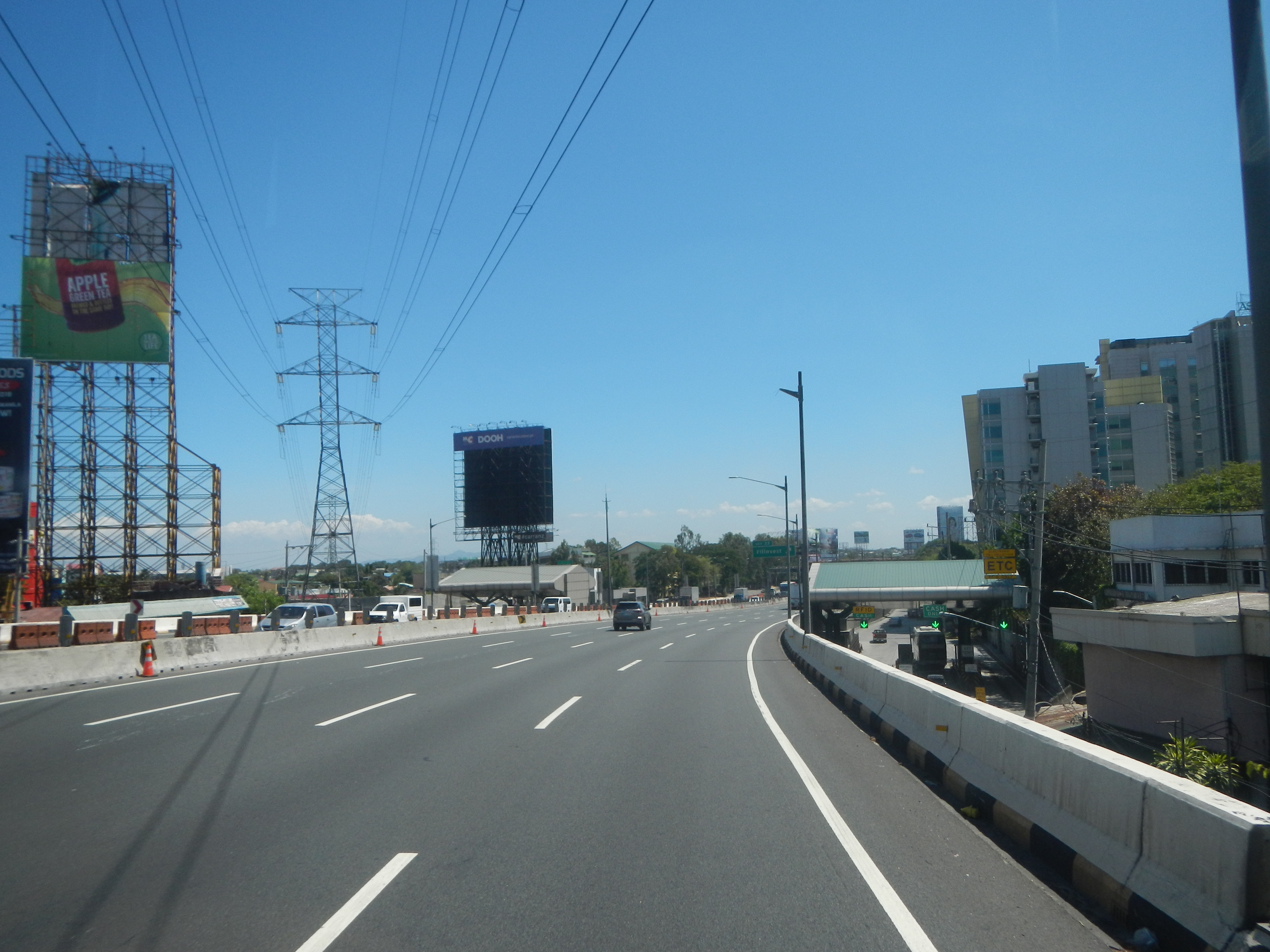
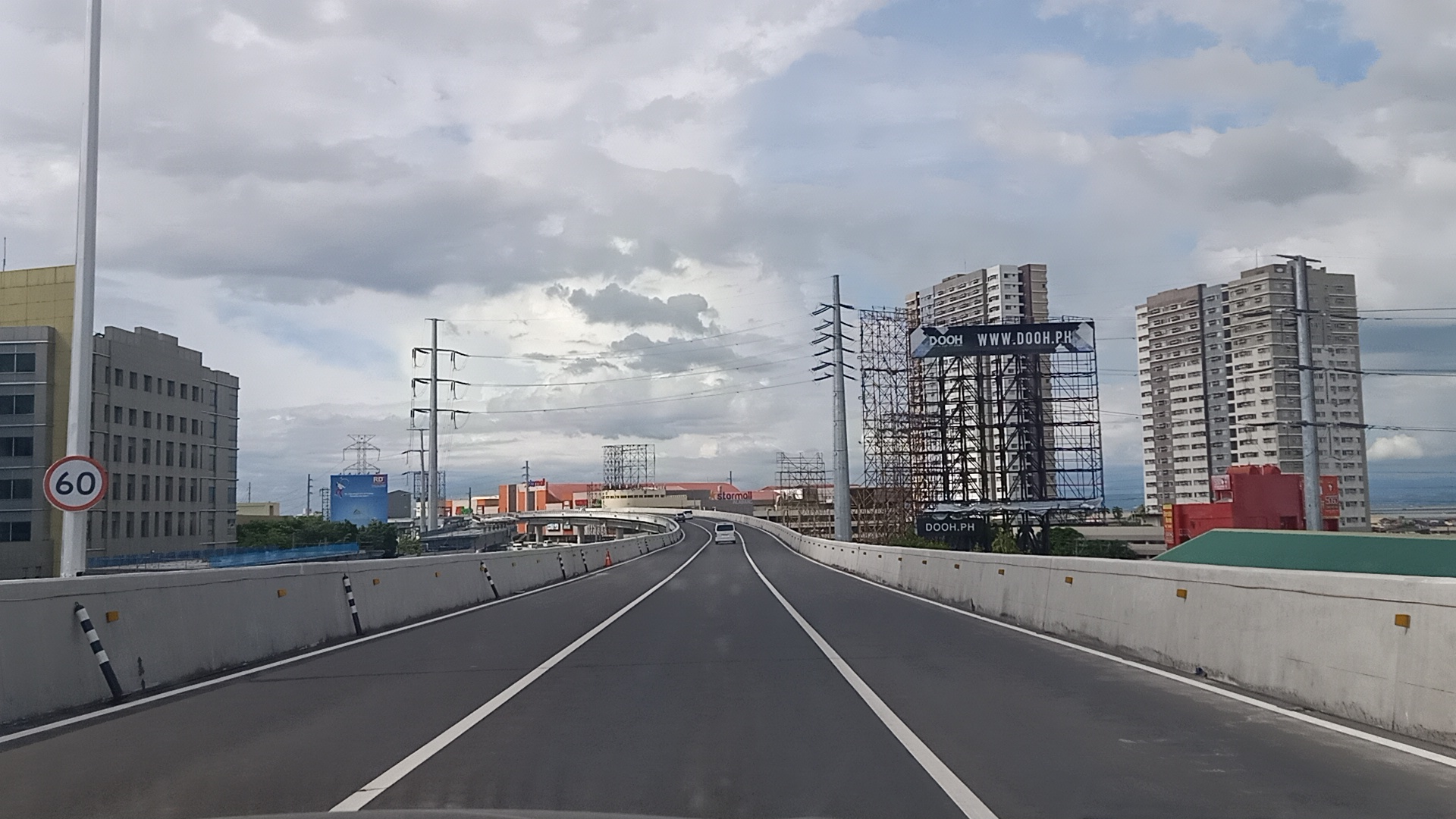
Towers of the transmission line's lines 1 and 2 in Muntinlupa, Metro Manila. Left: Near Alabang Viaduct of South Luzon Expressway (SLEx) is lattice tower 34 that collapsed last April 19, 2017 due to a fire caused by informal settlers living under the tower, with the said tower was removed and retired, and replaced with a new double-circuit steel pole located at Highway Homes Subdivision. Right: New steel poles for the transmission line as seen from the Skyway south extension.

Near the viaduct is tower 34 that collapsed last April 19, 2017 due to a fire caused by informal settlers living under the tower. It was later removed and retired, and replaced with a new double-circuit steel pole located at Highway Homes Subdivision. Bipole tower 34A is located, owned, operated, and maintained by National Grid Corporation of the Philippines (NGCP), is where NAPOCOR/NPC-era lattice tower 34 was once located, with steel poles 34B and 34C also NGCP-owned which are also double-circuit poles are located along the western side of Alabang Viaduct.

The transmission line then continues straightforward, passes into Susana Heights Exit, enters Laguna upon crossing Tunasan River, passes into San Pedro and Biñan, and ends at Biñan Substation.

=== Lines 3 and 4 ===
Lines 3 and 4, which consists of steel poles with line 4 owned, operated, and maintained by NGCP, utilize both sides of PNR Metro Commuter Line, now the North-South Commuter Railway from Muntinlupa to Biñan. Before ending at Biñan Substation, it turns right and passes into Forest Lake Memorial Park.

== Statistics ==
The transmission line consists of 172 steel poles, 51 lattice towers, and 1 H-frame with a total of 224 transmission structures.

== Expansion and improvements ==
Line 3 of the transmission line, which have a length of 13.5-kilometer (8.4 mi) and also commissioned by NAPOCOR/NPC. The project started on March 13, 1995, completed on December 6, 1996, and energized on December 22, 1996.

On August 28, 2009, National Grid Corporation of the Philippines (NGCP) began construction of line 4 of the transmission line. It was completed on June 27, 2010

Due to the construction of Skyway Stage 2, NGCP constructed bipole 47A located near Skyway and SLEX.

New steel poles 34, 34B, and 34C and bipole tower 34A were constructed due to the construction of Skyway Extension, with NAPOCOR-era lattice tower 34 was removed and retired.
