= 2025 Philippine local elections in Soccsksargen =

- May 12, 2025
- Gubernatorial elections
- 4 provincial governors and 1 city mayor
Party	Seats	+/–
PFP	2	+1
Lakas	1	0
Nacionalista	1	0
PCM	1	−1
This lists parties that won seats. See the complete results below.
- Vice gubernatorial elections
- 4 provincial vice governors and 1 city vice mayor
Party	Seats	+/–
Lakas	2	+1
PCM	1	0
PFP	1	0
RCRI	1	New
This lists parties that won seats. See the complete results below.
- Provincial Board elections
- 40 provincial board members and 12 city councilors
Party	Seats	+/–
PFP	20	+12
Lakas	14	+3
PCM	7	−6
PDP–Laban	5	−5
Nacionalista	3	−4
KANP	1	New
NPC	1	New
Independent	1	+1
This lists parties that won seats. See the complete results below.

The 2025 Philippine local elections in Soccsksargen were held on May 12, 2025.

== Summary ==
=== Governors ===
Province/city	Incumbent	Incumbent's party	Winner	Winner's party	Winning margin
Cotabato	Emmylou Mendoza	Nacionalista	Emmylou Mendoza	Nacionalista	27.60%
General Santos (HUC)	Lorelie Pacquiao	PCM	Lorelie Pacquiao	PCM	11.16%
Sarangani	Rogelio Pacquiao	PFP	Rogelio Pacquiao	PFP	34.93%
South Cotabato	Reynaldo Tamayo Jr.	PFP	Reynaldo Tamayo Jr.	PFP	40.20%
Sultan Kudarat	Pax Ali Mangudadatu	Lakas	Pax Ali Mangudadatu	Lakas	68.33%

=== Vice governors ===
Province/city	Incumbent	Incumbent's party	Winner	Winner's party	Winning margin
Cotabato	Efren Piñol	PDP–Laban	Ella Taray	Lakas	12.90%
General Santos (HUC)	Lita Nuñez	PDP–Laban	Ed Yumang	RCRI	9.40%
Sarangani	Elmer de Peralta	PFP	Bogi Martinez	PCM	25.58%
South Cotabato	Arthur Pingoy Jr.	PFP	Arthur Pingoy Jr.	PFP	Unopposed
Sultan Kudarat	Raden Sakaluran	Independent	Prince Raden Sakaluran	Lakas	73.80%

=== Provincial boards ===
Province/city	Seats	Party control		Composition
Province/city	Seats	Previous	Result	Composition
Cotabato	10 elected 4 ex-officio	No majority	No majority	Lakas (4); Nacionalista (3); NPC (1); KNP (1); Independent (1)
General Santos (HUC)	12 elected 3 ex-officio	No majority	No majority	PCM (7); PDP–Laban (5)
Sarangani	10 elected 4 ex-officio	PCM	PFP	PFP (10)
South Cotabato	10 elected 4 ex-officio	PFP	PFP	PFP (10)
Sultan Kudarat	10 elected 3 ex-officio	Lakas	Lakas	Lakas (10)

== Cotabato ==
=== Governor ===
Incumbent Governor Emmylou Mendoza of the Nacionalista Party ran for a second term.

Mendoza won re-election against former Mindanao Development Authority chairman Emmanuel Piñol (Nationalist People's Coalition) and Manuel Adajar (Independent).

Candidate	Party	Votes	%
Emmylou Mendoza (incumbent)	Nacionalista Party	414,043	63.61
Emmanuel Piñol	Nationalist People's Coalition	234,393	36.01
Manuel Adajar	Independent	2,446	0.38
Total		650,882	100.00
Valid votes		650,882	96.45
Invalid/blank votes		23,959	3.55
Total votes		674,841	100.00
Registered voters/turnout		797,609	84.61
Nacionalista hold			
Source: Commission on Elections

=== Vice Governor ===
Incumbent Vice Governor Efren Piñol of the PDP–Laban ran for a second term.

Piñol was defeated by Governor Emmylou Mendoza's niece, Ella Taray of Lakas–CMD.

Candidate	Party	Votes	%
Ella Taray	Lakas–CMD	349,374	56.45
Efren Piñol (incumbent)	PDP–Laban	269,507	43.55
Total		618,881	100.00
Valid votes		618,881	91.71
Invalid/blank votes		55,960	8.29
Total votes		674,841	100.00
Registered voters/turnout		797,609	84.61
Lakas gain from PDP–Laban			
Source: Commission on Elections

=== Provincial Board ===
The Cotabato Provincial Board is composed of 14 board members, 10 of whom are elected.

Lakas–CMD won four seats, becoming the largest party in the provincial board.

Party	Votes	%	Seats	+/–
Lakas–CMD	480,949	34.40	4	+3
Nacionalista Party	411,830	29.46	3	–3
Nationalist People's Coalition	116,488	8.33	1	New
Katipunan ng Nagkakaisang Pilipino	97,837	7.00	1	New
Independent	290,957	20.81	1	+1
Total	1,398,061	100.00	10	0
Total votes	674,841	–		
Registered voters/turnout	797,609	84.61		
Source: Commission on Elections

==== 1st district ====
Cotabato's 1st provincial district consists of the same area as Cotabato's 1st legislative district. Four board members are elected from this provincial district.

Five candidates were included in the ballot.

Candidate	Party	Votes	%
Neneng Macasarte	Lakas–CMD	114,154	22.83
Sittie Eljorie Antao (incumbent)	Nacionalista Party	102,973	20.59
Rose Cabaya	Lakas–CMD	102,100	20.42
Roland Jungco (incumbent)	Nacionalista Party	93,696	18.73
Toto Calibra	Independent	87,192	17.43
Total		500,115	100.00
Total votes		206,463	–
Registered voters/turnout		246,037	83.92
Source: Commission on Elections

==== 2nd district ====
Cotabato's 2nd provincial district consists of the same area as Cotabato's 2nd legislative district. Three board members are elected from this provincial district.

Four candidates were included in the ballot.

Candidate	Party	Votes	%
RJ Caoagdan (incumbent)	Nacionalista Party	152,821	35.58
Joseph Evangelista (incumbent)	Nationalist People's Coalition	116,488	27.12
Kris Piñol-Solis (incumbent)	Katipunan ng Nagkakaisang Pilipino	97,837	22.78
Toto Villasor	Nacionalista Party	62,340	14.52
Total		429,486	100.00
Total votes		234,797	–
Registered voters/turnout		276,804	84.82
Source: Commission on Elections

==== 3rd district ====
Cotabato's 3rd provincial district consists of the same area as Cotabato's 3rd legislative district. Three board members are elected from this provincial district.

Five candidates were included in the ballot.

Candidate	Party	Votes	%
Joemar Cerebo (incumbent)	Lakas–CMD	133,583	28.52
Ivy Dalumpines (incumbent)	Lakas–CMD	131,112	27.99
Reyman Saldivar	Independent	94,046	20.08
Socrates Piñol	Independent	63,417	13.54
Rodrigo Escudero	Independent	46,302	9.88
Total		468,460	100.00
Total votes		233,581	–
Registered voters/turnout		274,768	85.01
Source: Commission on Elections

== General Santos ==
=== Mayor ===
Incumbent Mayor Lorelie Pacquiao of the People's Champ Movement ran for a second term.

Pacquiao won re-election against General Santos vice mayor Lita Nuñez (PDP–Laban), and three other candidates.

Candidate	Party	Votes	%
Lorelie Pacquiao (incumbent)	People's Champ Movement	147,992	54.80
Lita Nuñez	PDP–Laban	117,844	43.64
Ana Paglangan	Independent	1,749	0.65
Juhir Esmail	Independent	1,429	0.53
Fraidelyn Dani	Independent	1,039	0.38
Total		270,053	100.00
Valid votes		270,053	95.43
Invalid/blank votes		12,943	4.57
Total votes		282,996	100.00
Registered voters/turnout		368,454	76.81
PCM hold			
Source: Commission on Elections

=== Vice Mayor ===
Incumbent Vice Mayor Lita Nuñez of the PDP–Laban ran for mayor of General Santos.

Nuñez endorsed city councilor Ed Yumang (Regional Communities Reforms Initiatives), who won the election against city councilor Odjok Acharon (People's Champ Movement).

Candidate	Party	Votes	%
Ed Yumang	Regional Communities Reforms Initiatives	139,050	54.70
Odjok Acharon	People's Champ Movement	115,140	45.30
Total		254,190	100.00
Valid votes		254,190	89.82
Invalid/blank votes		28,806	10.18
Total votes		282,996	100.00
Registered voters/turnout		368,454	76.81
RCRI gain from PDP–Laban			
Source: Commission on Elections

=== City Council ===
The General Santos City Council is composed of 15 councilors, 12 of whom are elected.

30 candidates were included in the ballot.

The People's Champ Movement won seven seats, becoming the largest party in the city council.

Party	Votes	%	Seats	+/–
People's Champ Movement	1,203,324	49.40	7	+4
PDP–Laban	775,162	31.82	5	0
Achievers with Integrity Movement	304,939	12.52	0	–2
Regional Communities Reforms Initiatives	53,880	2.21	0	–1
Independent	98,581	4.05	0	0
Total	2,435,886	100.00	12	0
Total votes	282,996	–		
Registered voters/turnout	368,454	76.81		
Source: Commission on Elections

Candidate	Party	Votes	%
Jonathan Blando (incumbent)	PDP–Laban	130,583	5.36
Cesar Bañas Jr.	PDP–Laban	125,466	5.15
Bing Dinopol	PDP–Laban	123,986	5.09
Beth Bagonoc (incumbent)	People's Champ Movement	115,045	4.72
Ralph Ronald Yumang	PDP–Laban	114,748	4.71
Jeng Gacal	People's Champ Movement	109,680	4.50
Michael Pacquiao	People's Champ Movement	108,604	4.46
Virgie Llido (incumbent)	People's Champ Movement	108,406	4.45
Richard Atendido (incumbent)	People's Champ Movement	108,228	4.44
Monching Melliza	PDP–Laban	107,650	4.42
Dom Lagare	People's Champ Movement	102,833	4.22
Joey Dinopol	People's Champ Movement	102,027	4.19
Edgar Acharon (incumbent)	PDP–Laban	100,609	4.13
Richard Casabuena	People's Champ Movement	100,290	4.12
Kan Balleque (incumbent)	Achievers with Integrity Movement	99,998	4.11
Art Cloma	Achievers with Integrity Movement	93,066	3.82
Aying Acharon	People's Champ Movement	93,040	3.82
George Anas	People's Champ Movement	89,258	3.66
Jake Reyes	People's Champ Movement	87,542	3.59
Jay Natividad	People's Champ Movement	78,371	3.22
Wahid Bualan	PDP–Laban	72,120	2.96
Willie Dangane	Achievers with Integrity Movement	58,684	2.41
John Demdam	Regional Communities Reforms Initiatives	53,880	2.21
Dyll Bartolaba	Achievers with Integrity Movement	53,191	2.18
Ken Acharon	Independent	42,276	1.74
Peter Charles Conlu	Independent	15,024	0.62
Ed Gulle	Independent	14,883	0.61
Jensan Medina	Independent	10,939	0.45
Regie Gil Ergino	Independent	7,733	0.32
Musa Udtat	Independent	7,726	0.32
Total		2,435,886	100.00
Total votes		282,996	–
Registered voters/turnout		368,454	76.81
Source: Commission on Elections

== Sarangani ==
=== Governor ===
Incumbent Governor Rogelio Pacquiao of the Partido Federal ng Pilipinas ran for a second term. He was previously affiliated with the People's Champ Movement.

Pacquiao won re-election against Bong Aquia (PDP–Laban) and Gladden Lim (Independent).

Candidate	Party	Votes	%
Rogelio Pacquiao (incumbent)	Partido Federal ng Pilipinas	155,989	66.31
Bong Aquia	PDP–Laban	73,823	31.38
Gladden Lim	Independent	5,424	2.31
Total		235,236	100.00
Valid votes		235,236	82.64
Invalid/blank votes		49,417	17.36
Total votes		284,653	100.00
Registered voters/turnout		373,178	76.28
PFP hold			
Source: Commission on Elections

=== Vice Governor ===
Term-limited incumbent Vice Governor Elmer de Peralta of the Partido Federal ng Pilipinas ran for the Sarangani Provincial Board in the 1st provincial district. He was previously affiliated with the People's Champ Movement.

De Peralta endorsed former Kiamba mayor Bogi Martinez (People's Champ Movement), who won against three other candidates.

Candidate	Party	Votes	%
Bogi Martinez	People's Champ Movement	115,321	52.27
Yoyong Yap	Independent	58,880	26.69
Nene Saguiguit	PDP–Laban	37,530	17.01
Elson Formoso	Aksyon Demokratiko	8,882	4.03
Total		220,613	100.00
Valid votes		220,613	77.50
Invalid/blank votes		64,040	22.50
Total votes		284,653	100.00
Registered voters/turnout		373,178	76.28
PCM gain from PFP			
Source: Commission on Elections

=== Provincial Board ===
The Sarangani Provincial Board is composed of 14 board members, 10 of whom are elected.

The Partido Federal ng Pilipinas won 10 seats, gaining a majority in the provincial board.

Party	Votes	%	Seats	+/–
Partido Federal ng Pilipinas	576,117	66.14	10	+10
PDP–Laban	238,962	27.43	0	New
Independent	55,957	6.42	0	0
Total	871,036	100.00	10	0
Total votes	284,653	–		
Registered voters/turnout	373,178	76.28		
Source: Commission on Elections

==== 1st district ====
Sarangani's 1st provincial district consists of the municipalities of Kiamba, Maasim and Maitum. Four board members are elected from this provincial district.

Seven candidates were included in the ballot.

Candidate	Party	Votes	%
Elmer de Peralta	Partido Federal ng Pilipinas	42,100	20.71
Cornelio Martinez Jr.	Partido Federal ng Pilipinas	35,450	17.44
Arnold Abequibel (incumbent)	Partido Federal ng Pilipinas	34,388	16.92
Tito Balazon	Partido Federal ng Pilipinas	33,793	16.62
Arturo Lawa	PDP–Laban	23,335	11.48
Bong Tuballes	PDP–Laban	17,998	8.85
Musa Solaiman	PDP–Laban	16,226	7.98
Total		203,290	100.00
Total votes		93,468	–
Registered voters/turnout		114,043	81.96
Source: Commission on Elections

==== 2nd district ====
Sarangani's 2nd provincial district consists of the municipalities of Alabel, Glan, Malapatan and Malungon. Six board members are elected from this provincial district.

17 candidates were included in the ballot.

Candidate	Party	Votes	%
Tata Galzote (incumbent)	Partido Federal ng Pilipinas	82,405	12.34
Irish Arnado (incumbent)	Partido Federal ng Pilipinas	79,675	11.93
Joseph Calanao (incumbent)	Partido Federal ng Pilipinas	73,909	11.07
Gwynn Singcoy (incumbent)	Partido Federal ng Pilipinas	67,956	10.18
Jose Tranquilino Ruiz (incumbent)	Partido Federal ng Pilipinas	63,710	9.54
Corazon Grafilo (incumbent)	Partido Federal ng Pilipinas	62,731	9.39
Cyril John Rustico Yap	PDP–Laban	52,510	7.86
Tongco Pangolima	PDP–Laban	28,739	4.30
Lito Cerna	PDP–Laban	26,587	3.98
Jorge Liansing Jr.	PDP–Laban	26,320	3.94
Hanna Jane Navarro	PDP–Laban	26,470	3.96
Eugene Alzate	Independent	24,211	3.63
Jonilo Lumacad	PDP–Laban	20,777	3.11
Clarito Palalisan	Independent	11,590	1.74
Moreb Dalama	Independent	8,920	1.34
Abdilla Morsal	Independent	6,041	0.90
Gerry Bomes	Independent	5,195	0.78
Total		667,746	100.00
Total votes		191,185	–
Registered voters/turnout		259,135	73.78
Source: Commission on Elections

== South Cotabato ==
=== Governor ===
Incumbent Governor Reynaldo Tamayo Jr. of the Partido Federal ng Pilipinas ran for a third term.

Tamayo won re-election against representative Peter Miguel's wife, Shine Miguel (Aksyon Demokratiko).

Candidate	Party	Votes	%
Reynaldo Tamayo Jr. (incumbent)	Partido Federal ng Pilipinas	346,611	69.73
Shine Miguel	Aksyon Demokratiko	146,789	29.53
Efren Biclar	Independent	1,903	0.38
Ramir Badayos	Independent	1,748	0.35
Total		497,051	100.00
Valid votes		497,051	93.93
Invalid/blank votes		32,137	6.07
Total votes		529,188	100.00
Registered voters/turnout		629,367	84.08
PFP hold			
Source: Commission on Elections

=== Vice Governor ===
Incumbent Vice Governor Dodo Pingoy of the Partido Federal ng Pilipinas won re-election for a second term unopposed.

Candidate	Party	Votes	%
Dodo Pingoy (incumbent)	Partido Federal ng Pilipinas	331,376	100.00
Total		331,376	100.00
Valid votes		331,376	62.62
Invalid/blank votes		197,812	37.38
Total votes		529,188	100.00
Registered voters/turnout		629,367	84.08
PFP hold			
Source: Commission on Elections

=== Provincial Board ===
The South Cotabato Provincial Board consists of 14 board members, 10 of whom are elected.

The Partido Federal ng Pilipinas won 10 seats, maintaining its majority in the provincial board.

Party	Votes	%	Seats	+/–
Partido Federal ng Pilipinas	828,389	68.59	10	+2
PDP–Laban	144,021	11.93	0	–2
Aksyon Demokratiko	96,348	7.98	0	New
Independent	138,950	11.51	0	0
Total	1,207,708	100.00	10	0
Total votes	529,188	–		
Registered voters/turnout	629,367	84.08		
Source: Commission on Elections

==== 1st district ====
South Cotabato's 1st provincial district consists of the same area as South Cotabato's 1st legislative district. Three board members are elected from this provincial district.

Six candidates were included in the ballot.

Candidate	Party	Votes	%
Rubi Hatulan	Partido Federal ng Pilipinas	70,779	21.45
Bebot Escobillo (incumbent)	Partido Federal ng Pilipinas	68,731	20.83
Nilda Almencion (incumbent)	Partido Federal ng Pilipinas	67,270	20.39
Alan Ines (incumbent)	PDP–Laban	60,727	18.41
Danny Nograles	PDP–Laban	48,838	14.80
Michael Niedo	Independent	13,598	4.12
Total		329,943	100.00
Total votes		160,773	–
Registered voters/turnout		195,438	82.26
Source: Commission on Elections

==== 2nd district ====
South Cotabato's 2nd provincial district consists of the same area as South Cotabato's 2nd legislative district. In 2022, the district was reduced to the city of Koronadal and the municipalities of Banga and Tantangan. Three board members are elected from this provincial district.

Seven candidates were included in the ballot.

Candidate	Party	Votes	%
Annabelle Pingoy	Partido Federal ng Pilipinas	111,803	29.12
Junette Hurtado (incumbent)	Partido Federal ng Pilipinas	107,429	27.98
Inday Diel (incumbent)	Partido Federal ng Pilipinas	92,376	24.06
Hilario de Pedro VI	Independent	49,773	12.96
Pedro Bautista Jr.	Independent	13,179	3.43
Danilo Dumandagan	Independent	6,605	1.72
Lino Saig	Independent	2,797	0.73
Total		383,962	100.00
Total votes		183,113	–
Registered voters/turnout		211,517	86.57
Source: Commission on Elections

==== 3rd district ====
South Cotabato's 3rd provincial district consists of the same area as South Cotabato's 3rd legislative district. In 2022, the provincial district was created with the municipalities of Lake Sebu, Norala, Santo Niño, Surallah and T'boli, which used to be under South Cotabato's 2nd provincial district. Four board members are elected from this provincial district.

15 candidates were included in the ballot.

Candidate	Party	Votes	%
Nicole Causing	Partido Federal ng Pilipinas	91,525	18.53
Ervin Luntao (incumbent)	Partido Federal ng Pilipinas	85,681	17.35
Toto Rosal	Partido Federal ng Pilipinas	70,700	14.32
Sarse Atam Jr.	Partido Federal ng Pilipinas	62,095	12.57
Beltran Armada	Aksyon Demokratiko	48,230	9.77
Noel Felongco	PDP–Laban	34,456	6.98
Judy Artacho	Aksyon Demokratiko	25,018	5.07
Mary Joy Paglangan	Aksyon Demokratiko	23,100	4.68
Aubrey John Gedorio	Independent	15,998	3.24
Emilio Daway	Independent	10,019	2.03
Christy Belgera	Independent	8,321	1.69
Dara Tapel	Independent	5,033	1.02
Dot San	Independent	4,739	0.96
Romano Nievares	Independent	4,674	0.95
Ansary Comayog	Independent	4,214	0.85
Total		493,803	100.00
Total votes		185,302	–
Registered voters/turnout		222,412	83.31
Source: Commission on Elections

== Sultan Kudarat ==
=== Governor ===
Incumbent Governor Pax Ali Mangudadatu of Lakas–CMD ran for a second term.

Mangudadatu won re-election against model Sharifa Akeel (Partido Federal ng Pilipinas), Sultan Kudarat vice governor Raden Sakaluran (Independent), and Nelrey Calvo (Independent).

Candidate	Party	Votes	%
Pax Ali Mangudadatu (incumbent)	Lakas–CMD	302,401	81.03
Sharifa Akeel	Partido Federal ng Pilipinas	47,393	12.70
Raden Sakaluran	Independent	14,767	3.96
Nelrey Calvo	Independent	8,632	2.31
Total		373,193	100.00
Valid votes		373,193	86.95
Invalid/blank votes		56,019	13.05
Total votes		429,212	100.00
Registered voters/turnout		533,384	80.47
Lakas hold			
Source: Commission on Elections

=== Vice Governor ===
Incumbent Vice Governor Raden Sakaluran (Independent) ran for governor of Sultan Kudarat. He was previously affiliated with Lakas–CMD.

Sakaluran's son, Lutayan vice mayor Prince Raden Sakaluran (Lakas–CMD), won the election against Lex Galande (Partido Federal ng Pilipinas).

Candidate	Party	Votes	%
Prince Raden Sakaluran	Lakas–CMD	286,550	86.90
Lex Galande	Partido Federal ng Pilipinas	43,180	13.10
Total		329,730	100.00
Valid votes		329,730	76.82
Invalid/blank votes		99,482	23.18
Total votes		429,212	100.00
Registered voters/turnout		533,384	80.47
Lakas gain from Independent			
Source: Commission on Elections

=== Provincial Board ===
The Sultan Kudarat Provincial Board is composed of 13 board members, 10 of whom are elected.

Lakas–CMD won 10 seats, maintaining its majority in the provincial board.

Party	Votes	%	Seats	+/–
Lakas–CMD	1,072,584	89.81	10	0
Partido Federal ng Pilipinas	121,648	10.19	0	New
Total	1,194,232	100.00	10	0
Total votes	429,212	–		
Registered voters/turnout	533,384	80.47		
Source: Commission on Elections

==== 1st district ====
Sultan Kudarat's 1st provincial district consists of the same area as Sultan Kudarat's 1st legislative district. Five board members are elected from this provincial district.

Seven candidates were included in the ballot.

Candidate	Party	Votes	%
Ian Jordan Abalos (incumbent)	Lakas–CMD	147,881	20.49
Jovita Duque (incumbent)	Lakas–CMD	129,022	17.88
Jose Remos Segura (incumbent)	Lakas–CMD	128,560	17.81
Elias Segura Jr.	Lakas–CMD	126,576	17.54
Ernest Patrick Matias	Lakas–CMD	124,613	17.27
Cherry Bermudez	Partido Federal ng Pilipinas	32,669	4.53
Ote Cajandig	Partido Federal ng Pilipinas	32,385	4.49
Total		721,706	100.00
Total votes		235,055	–
Registered voters/turnout		275,693	85.26
Source: Commission on Elections

==== 2nd district ====
Sultan Kudarat's 2nd provincial district consists of the same area as Sultan Kudarat's 2nd legislative district. Five board members are elected from this provincial district.

Eight candidates were included in the ballot.

Candidate	Party	Votes	%
Neneng de Pedro	Lakas–CMD	106,388	22.51
Glecy Fornan (incumbent)	Lakas–CMD	80,722	17.08
Loida de Manuel (incumbent)	Lakas–CMD	80,100	16.95
Soriel Lib-atin (incumbent)	Lakas–CMD	78,964	16.71
Amil Pangansayan (incumbent)	Lakas–CMD	69,758	14.76
Joy Somollo	Partido Federal ng Pilipinas	27,524	5.82
Gilbys Dequito	Partido Federal ng Pilipinas	18,274	3.87
Samie Uy	Partido Federal ng Pilipinas	10,796	2.28
Total		472,526	100.00
Total votes		194,157	–
Registered voters/turnout		257,691	75.34
Source: Commission on Elections

== Election-related incidents ==
On November 17, 2024 a candidate for vice mayor was shot dead in Tantangan, South Cotabato. On November 23, the assistant COMELEC officer for Isulan, Sultan Kudarat, was also shot dead. On January 18, 2025, a candidate for councilor in Northern Kabuntalan, Maguindanao del Norte, was shot dead in Midsayap, Cotabato.
