= 2025 Philippine local elections =

- May 12, 2025

All local elected offices above the barangay level
	First party	Second party	Third party
Party	PFP	Lakas	Nacionalista
Governors	24 / 82	13 / 82	12 / 82
Vice governors	21 / 82	22 / 82	8 / 82
Board members	193 / 806	167 / 806	99 / 806
	Fourth party	Fifth party	Sixth party
Party	NUP	NPC	PDP
Governors	7 / 82	5 / 82	4 / 82
Vice governors	6 / 82	5 / 82	3 / 82
Board members	73 / 806	58 / 806	14 / 806
President of the Union of Local Authorities of the Philippines before election
South Cotabato Governor
Reynaldo Tamayo Jr.
PFP
Elected President of the Union of Local Authorities of the Philippines
Quirino Governor
Dakila Cua
PFP

Local elections in the Philippines took place on May 12, 2025. These were conducted together with the 2025 general election for national positions. All elected positions above the barangay level were contested. The following 18,191 positions were contested:

- All 82 provincial governorships and vice-governorships
- 840 provincial board members (regular Sangguniang Panlalawigan members)
- All 149 mayorships and vice mayorships in cities
- 1,682 city councilors (regular Sangguniang Panlungsod members)
- All 1,493 mayorships and vice mayorships in municipalities
- 11,948 municipal councilors (regular Sangguniang Bayan members)

The election for the Bangsamoro Parliament was originally synchronized with the local elections but was postponed to September 2026.

The elective positions in the barangays were not decided on this day. The elections for these positions will be held in November 2026.

== Electoral system ==
Local government in the Philippines is governed by the Local Government Code of 1991. The country is divided into autonomous regions, provinces, cities, municipalities and barangays. For elections on this day, all local positions above the barangay level and below the regional level are disputed.

Election slates of a governor, vice governor and Sangguniang Panlalawigan (for provinces), mayor, vice mayor and Sangguniang Panlungsod/Bayan (for cities and municipalities) are common. Provincial and city/municipal slates may cross-endorse each other. Slates may contain candidates from multiple parties. Positions are elected separately.

=== Executive positions ===
For governor, vice governor, mayor and vice mayor, voting is via first-past-the-post.

=== Legislative positions ===
For regular members of the Sangguniang Panlalawigan, Panlungsod and Bayan, voting is via multiple non-transferable vote, where a voter has as many votes as there are positions, and can distribute it to how many candidates there are on the ballot.

Reserved seats designated as Indigenous People's Mandatory Representation are not elected on this day, nor are barangay positions.

Ex officio seats in local legislatures are also not elected on this day. Philippine Councilors League seats on the Sangguniang Panlalawigan are scheduled to be held between July and September 2025, then regional elections are to be held from October to December 2025. Liga ng mga Barangay and Sangguniang Kabataan ex officio members are to retain their seats until a new of set of officials is elected in November 2026.

== Bangsamoro Parliament ==
According to the Bangsamoro Organic Law, the first Bangsamoro Parliament election should had been in 2022, along with the 2022 local elections. However, a law was passed that deferred it to 2025, along with the 2025 local elections. In February 2025, another law deferred it to October 2025, which caused it not to be held concurrently with the elections in May. The law considers the October 2025 Bangsamoro elections as a continuation of the 2025 general election, and not as a "special election", and that the winners shall serve until June 2028, with the May 2028 elections not being changed.

== Provincial elections ==
All 82 provinces shall hold elections for their elective offices.

The provinces of Maguindanao del Norte and Maguindanao del Sur shall hold its first election after voters from the old province of Maguindanao approved its division in a 2022 plebiscite.

Totals in boldface denote that the party won a majority of seats in the provincial board, including ex officio and reserved seats.

Province	Governor	Vice Governor	Elected seats	Sangguniang Panlalawigan seats won										Ref.
Province	Governor	Vice Governor	Elected seats	PFP	Lakas	NP	NUP	NPC	PDP	LP	Aksyon	Others	Ind.	Ref.
Abra	PFP	PFP	8	7				1						
Agusan del Norte	PDP	PDP	10						8				2	
Agusan del Sur	NUP	NUP	10				**10**							
Aklan	Lakas	Lakas	10	4	4	1				1				
Albay	PDP	Lakas	10	1	4				1	3		1		
Antique	Aksyon	NUP	10			2	3	1			2		2	
Apayao	NPC	Lakas	8		3			5						
Aurora	LDP	LDP	8	1								6	1	
Basilan	BUP	PFP	8	5								3		
Bataan	PFP	PFP	10	5		2	3							
Batanes	PFP	PFP	6	2				1		2			1	
Batangas	Nacionalista	PDP	12			**10**		1					1	
Benguet	Lakas	Lakas	10	1	8							1		
Biliran	Nacionalista	Lakas	8		3	4							1	
Bohol	PFP	Nacionalista	10	4		4	1					1		
Bukidnon	PFP	BPP	10									9	1	
Bulacan	NUP	NUP	14	2	2		8					1	1	
Cagayan	Nacionalista	Nacionalista	10		5	4		1						
Camarines Norte	PFP	Liberal	10	8		1		1						
Camarines Sur	NUP	NUP	10				8	2						
Camiguin	Lakas	PFP	6	6										
Capiz	1-Capiz	1-Capiz	10	1								9		
Catanduanes	Independent	Lakas	8		7			1						
Cavite	NUP	Lakas	16		4		**10**	1			1			
Cebu	PDP	1CEBU	16		2	2						12		
Cotabato	Nacionalista	Lakas	10		4	3		1				1	1	
Davao de Oro	Independent	PFP	10	5	5									
Davao del Norte	PFP	PFP	10	4	5								1	
Davao del Sur	Nacionalista	Nacionalista	10			**9**							1	
Davao Occidental	PFP	Lakas	8		3			5						
Davao Oriental	Nacionalista	Nacionalista	10	3	4	2			1					
Dinagat Islands	PFP	PFP	8	3	4							2	1	
Eastern Samar	PFP	PFP	10	**10**										
Guimaras	NUP	NUP	8				**7**						1	
Ifugao	Lakas	PDP	8	2	3			1						
Ilocos Norte	Nacionalista	Nacionalista	10			**7**						2	1	
Ilocos Sur	Bileg	Bileg	10	1								9		
Iloilo	Uswag Ilonggo	PFP	10	3	3	2				1		1		
Isabela	PFP	Lakas	12	6	2			2			1	1		
Kalinga	Lakas	PFP	8	1		4				1	1		1	
La Union	PFP	Lakas	10		**8**								2	
Laguna	AKAY	Lakas	14	2	5		5	1				1		
Lanao del Norte	Lakas	Lakas	10		6							4		
Lanao del Sur	Lakas	Lakas	10	1	**8**							1		
Leyte	NPC	NPC	10	1			4	4		1				
Maguindanao del Norte	PFP	UBJP	10	4	1							5		
Maguindanao del Sur	PFP	UBJP	10	3		4						3		
Marinduque	PDP	Independent	8	5	1								2	
Masbate	Lakas	Lakas	10		8				2					
Misamis Occidental	Nacionalista	Asenso Pinoy	10									10		
Misamis Oriental	NUP	Lakas	10		5	1	1					3		
Mountain Province	PFP	Independent	8	4		1						1	2	
Negros Occidental	NPC	NUP	12	2		1	4	3				2		
Negros Oriental	PFP	PFP	10	**10**										
Northern Samar	NUP	PFP	10	1			**7**						2	
Nueva Ecija	Sigaw	Sigaw	10	2	1		1					6		
Nueva Vizcaya	PFP	Aksyon	10	1	2	5					1	1		
Occidental Mindoro	PFP	PFP	10	8		1				1				
Oriental Mindoro	GSM	MBS	10	2	1							7		
Palawan	PPPL	PPPL	10								1	9		
Pampanga	Kambilan	NPC	10		1							5	4	
Pangasinan	Nacionalista	Lakas	12		1	**7**		1		1		1	1	
Quezon	Stan Q	Stan Q	10		1							9		
Quirino	PFP	PFP	8	5				1					2	
Rizal	NPC	NPC	10	1		1	1	6	1					
Romblon	Liberal	PFP	8	4		3				1				
Samar	Nacionalista	PFP	10			**10**								
Sarangani	PFP	PCM	10	**9**					1					
Siquijor	PFP	PFP	8	**8**										
Sorsogon	NPC	NPC	10					**10**						
South Cotabato	PFP	PFP	10	**10**										
Southern Leyte	Lakas	Lakas	10		7									
Sultan Kudarat	Lakas	Lakas	10		**10**									
Sulu	Lakas	Lakas	10		**10**									
Surigao del Norte	Nacionalista	Nacionalista	10	1	4	5								
Surigao del Sur	Nacionalista	Nacionalista	10	**8**		1						1		
Tarlac	SST	NPC	10	1				**7**					2	
Tawi-Tawi	PFP	PFP	8	6									2	
Zambales	SZP	Lakas	10					1				9		
Zamboanga del Norte	Lakas	Lakas	10			**8**				2				
Zamboanga del Sur	Lakas	PFP	10	4	4							2		
Zamboanga Sibugay	PFP	Nacionalista	10	5	2	2						1		
Total			806	193	167	99	73	58	14	14	7	142	39	

== City elections ==
All 149 cities shall hold elections for its elective offices.

The new cities of Baliwag, Calaca and Carmona will elect its officials for the first time as cities after their voters approved cityhood in separate plebiscites from 2022 to 2023.

Butuan and Taguig increased the number of councilors in its city councils. Butuan now has 12 councilors elected at large from 10, while Taguig now has 12 councilors elected from its two districts, from 8 per district.

=== Highly urbanized cities ===
City	Mayor	Vice Mayor	Elected seats	Sangguniang Panlungsod seats won										Ref.
City	Mayor	Vice Mayor	Elected seats	Lakas	PFP	NP	NPC	Aksyon	NUP	PDP	LP	Others	Ind.	Ref.
Angeles	Lakas	PRP	10	8									2	
Bacolod	NPC	NPC	12				9						3	
Baguio	NPC	PFP	12	4	1	1	1				1		4	
Butuan	Nacionalista	Nacionalista	12	3		8			1					
Cagayan de Oro	PFP	CDP	16		10				1	2		3 (Note: 2 seats from Padayon Pilipino, and 1 seat from Centrist Democratic Party of the Philippines)		
Caloocan	Nacionalista	Nacionalista	18	1		13		1	1		2			
Cebu City	Liberal	Liberal	16	3	5			1			6	1 (Note: 1 seat from Partido Barug)		
Davao City	Hugpong (Note: Former president Rodrigo Duterte, the proclaimed mayor of Davao City, is currently detained in The Hague under an International Criminal Court investigation for alleged crimes against humanity.)	Hugpong	24							4		20 (Note: 19 seats from Hugpong sa Tawong Lungsod, and 1 seat from Hugpong ng Pagbabago)		
General Santos	PCM	RCRI	12							5		7 (Note: 7 seats from People's Champ Movement)		
Iligan	Nacionalista	PMP	12			8	1					3 (Note: 3 seats from Pwersa ng Masang Pilipino)		
Iloilo City	NUP	Lakas	12	1	6				5					
Lapu-Lapu	Lakas	PFP	12	5	7									
Las Piñas	NPC	NPC	12			6	6							
Lucena	Stan Q	Stan Q	10	1								8 (Note: 7 seats from Stand Up Quezon (Stan Q), and 1 seat from Katipunan ng Nagkakaisang Pilipino)	1	
Makati	UNA	NPC	16									16 (Note: 9 seats from Makatizens United Party, and 7 seats from United Nationalist Alliance)		
Malabon	Nacionalista	Lakas	12	1	2	3	1		1	1		3 (Note: 2 seats from Pwersa ng Masang Pilipino, and 1 seat from United Nationalist Alliance)		
Mandaluyong	PFP	PFP	12		11					1				
Mandaue	Lakas	1CEBU	10	5							1	4 (Note: 4 seats from One Cebu)		
Manila	Aksyon	Aksyon	36					23				12 (Note: 12 seats from Asenso Manileño)	1	
Marikina	NUP	Lakas	16	5					10				1	
Muntinlupa	1Munti	Independent	16									16 (Note: 16 seats from One Muntinlupa)		
Navotas	Navoteño	Navoteño	12									12 (Note: 12 seats from Partido Navoteño)		
Olongapo	Nacionalista	Aksyon (Note: Even though Kaye Ann Legaspi is an independent, she was labeled in the ballot and Certificate of Candidacy (COC) as member of Aksyon)	10	3	1	3						1 (Note: 1 seat from People's Reform Party)	2	
Parañaque	Lakas	PFP	16	11	2				1				2	
Pasay	PFP	Lakas	12	5	5							2 (Note: 2 seats from Tapat Kayong Paglilingkuran)		
Pasig	Independent	Independent	12				6			1		2 (Note: 1 seat from Akbayan and 1 seat from Akay National Political Party)	3	
Puerto Princesa	PFP	Liberal	10	1	8					1				
Quezon City	SBP	SBP	36	3	1	1		1				28 (Note: 28 seats from Serbisyo sa Bayan Party)	2	
San Juan	PFP	PFP	12		11							1 (Note: 1 seat from Pwersa ng Masang Pilipino)		
Tacloban	Nacionalista	Lakas	10	7							1	1 (Note: 1 seat from Katipunan ng Nagkakaisang Pilipino)	1	
Taguig	Nacionalista	Nacionalista	24			24								
Valenzuela	NPC	NPC	12	1			10		1					
Zamboanga City	Nacionalista	Partido PAZ	16	6		2						6 (Note: 6 seats from Prosperidad y Amor para na Zamboanga (PAZ))	2	
Total			490	74	70	69	34	26	21	15	11	146	24	

=== Independent component cities ===
City	Mayor	Vice Mayor	Elected seats	Sangguniang Panlungsod seats won							Ref.
City	Mayor	Vice Mayor	Elected seats	PFP	UBJP	Lakas	LP	Aksyon	NP	Ind.	Ref.
Cotabato City	UBJP	UBJP	10		10						
Dagupan	PFP	PFP	10	9					1		
Naga (Bicol)	Liberal	Liberal	10				8			2	
Ormoc	PFP	PFP	10	10							
Santiago	Lakas	Lakas	10			9		1			
Total			50	19	10	9	8	1	1	2	

=== Component cities ===
==== Region I (Ilocos Region) ====
City	Mayor	Vice Mayor	Elected seats	Sangguniang Panlungsod seats won								Ref.
City	Mayor	Vice Mayor	Elected seats	NP	Bileg	Lakas	PFP	NPC	Reporma	API	Ind.	Ref.
Alaminos, Pangasinan	Nacionalista	Nacionalista	10	9						1		
Batac, Ilocos Norte	Nacionalista	Nacionalista	10	6							4	
Candon, Ilocos Sur	Bileg	Bileg	10		7		2				1	
Laoag, Ilocos Norte	Nacionalista	Reporma	10	6					1		3	
San Carlos, Pangasinan	Nacionalista	Nacionalista	10	9				1				
San Fernando, La Union	Independent	Lakas	12			5	1				6	
Urdaneta, Pangasinan	Independent	Independent	10	1							9	
Vigan, Ilocos Sur	Bileg	Bileg	10		8						2	
Total			82	31	15	5	3	1	1	1	25	

==== Cordillera Administrative Region ====
City	Mayor	Vice Mayor	Elected seats	Sangguniang Panlungsod seats won				Ref.
City	Mayor	Vice Mayor	Elected seats	NP	PFP	LP	Ind.	Ref.
Tabuk, Kalinga	PFP	PFP	10	6	1	1	2	
Total			10	6	1	1	2	

==== Region II (Cagayan Valley) ====
City	Mayor	Vice Mayor	Elected seats	Seats won							Ref.
City	Mayor	Vice Mayor	Elected seats	PFP	NPC	Lakas	NUP	NP	WPP	Ind.	Ref.
Cauayan, Isabela	NPC	Lakas	10	3	3	3			1		
Ilagan, Isabela	PFP	PFP	10	9						1	
Tuguegarao, Cagayan	NUP	Lakas	12		5	1	4	1		1	
Total			32	12	8	4	4	1	1	2	

==== Region III (Central Luzon) ====
City	Mayor	Vice Mayor	Elected seats	Seats won							Ref.
City	Mayor	Vice Mayor	Elected seats	PFP	Lakas	NUP	NPC	Sigaw	Others	Ind.	Ref.
Balanga, Bataan	PFP	PFP	10	8					2 (Note: 2 seats from Partido Balikatan ng Bataan)		
Baliwag, Bulacan	NUP	NUP	10			8				2	
Cabanatuan, Nueva Ecija	PFP	PFP	10	9				1			
Gapan, Nueva Ecija	Lakas	Lakas	10		10						
Mabalacat, Pampanga	Kambilan	Kambilan	10				2		7 (Note: 7 seats from Kapanalig at Kambilan ning Memalen Pampanga)	1	
Malolos, Bulacan	NUP	Independent	10			7				3	
Meycauayan, Bulacan	PFP	PFP	10	10							
Muñoz, Nueva Ecija	PELA	PELA	10						7 (Note: 7 seats from People's Empowerment sa Lungsod ng Agham ng Muñoz (PELA))	3	
Palayan, Nueva Ecija	NPC	NPC	10				9			1	
San Fernando, Pampanga	Independent	PFP	10							10	
San Jose, Nueva Ecija	Lakas	Lakas	10		7			3			
San Jose del Monte, Bulacan	PFP	AR	12			1			11 (Note: 10 seats from Arangkada San Joseño, and 1 seat from Akbayan)		
Tarlac City	NPC	PFP	10	5			5				
Total			132	32	17	16	16	4	27	20	

==== Region IV-A (Calabarzon) ====
City	Mayor	Vice Mayor	Elected seats	Seats won								Ref.
City	Mayor	Vice Mayor	Elected seats	NUP	Lakas	NPC	NP	PFP	Aksyon	Others	Ind.	Ref.
Antipolo, Rizal	NPC	NUP	16	8		7					1	
Bacoor, Cavite	Nacionalista	NPC	12		4	4	4					
Batangas City	Nacionalista	Nacionalista	12				12					
Biñan, Laguna	NUP	NUP	12	6	5				1			
Cabuyao, Laguna	NUP	NUP	10	9	1							
Calaca, Batangas	Nacionalista	Nacionalista	10			10						
Calamba, Laguna	Lakas	Lakas	12		11			1				
Carmona, Cavite	NPC	NPC	10			10						
Cavite City	NPC	NUP	10		10							
Dasmariñas, Cavite	NUP	NUP	12	11							1	
General Trias, Cavite	NUP	NUP	12	12								
Imus, Cavite	NUP	NUP	12	11					1			
Lipa, Batangas	Nacionalista	Nacionalista	12				12					
San Pablo, Laguna	RP	Nacionalista	10			1	8				1	
San Pedro, Laguna	Lakas	NUP	12		9		1	2				
Santa Rosa, Laguna	Lakas	Lakas	12		11						1	
Santo Tomas, Batangas	Nacionalista	Nacionalista	10			10						
Tagaytay, Cavite	NUP	NUP	10	7						3 (Note: 3 seats from United Nationalist Democratic Organization)		
Tanauan, Batangas	NPC	NPC	10			7		3				
Tayabas, Quezon	NPC	Lakas	10		5	2				3 (Note: 3 seats from Stand Up Quezon (Stan Q).)		
Trece Martires, Cavite	NUP	NUP	10	10								
Total			236	74	56	51	37	6	2	6	4	

==== Mimaropa ====
City	Mayor	Vice Mayor	Elected seats	Seats won		Ref.
City	Mayor	Vice Mayor	Elected seats	MBS	GSM	Ref.
Calapan, Oriental Mindoro	MBS	MBS	10	8	2	
Total			10	8	2	

==== Region V (Bicol Region) ====
City	Mayor	Vice Mayor	Elected seats	Seats won						Ref.
City	Mayor	Vice Mayor	Elected seats	NUP	Lakas	NPC	LP	PDP	Ind.	Ref.
Iriga, Camarines Sur	NUP	NUP	10	10						
Legazpi, Albay	Lakas	Lakas	10		7			2	1	
Ligao, Albay	NUP	NUP	10	9	1					
Masbate City	Lakas	Lakas	10		10					
Sorsogon City	NPC	NPC	12			12				
Tabaco, Albay	Lakas	Liberal	10		1		8	1		
Total			62	19	19	12	8	3	1	

==== Region VI (Western Visayas) ====
City	Mayor	Vice Mayor	Elected seats	Seats won			Ref.
City	Mayor	Vice Mayor	Elected seats	1Capiz	Lakas	NP	Ref.
Passi, Iloilo	Nacionalista	Lakas	10		5	5	
Roxas, Capiz	1-Capiz	1-Capiz	10	10			
Total			20	10	5	5	

==== Negros Island Region ====
City	Mayor	Vice Mayor	Elected seats	Seats won									Ref.
City	Mayor	Vice Mayor	Elected seats	NPC	Lakas	NUP	PFP	UNegA	NP	LP	Akbayan	Ind.	Ref.
Bago, Negros Occidental	PFP	NUP	10	1		7	2						
Bais, Negros Oriental	NPC	NPC	10	10									
Bayawan, Negros Oriental	Nacionalista	Lakas	10	9								1	
Cadiz, Negros Occidental	Lakas	NUP	10		8	2							
Canlaon, Negros Oriental	NPC	NPC	10	9								1	
Dumaguete, Negros Oriental	NPC	NPC	10	5	2					3			
Escalante, Negros Occidental	NPC	NPC	10	10									
Guihulngan, Negros Oriental	Nacionalista	Nacionalista	10						10				
Himamaylan, Negros Occidental	UNegA	UNegA	10				1	7				2	
Kabankalan, Negros Occidental	PFP	PFP	10	7							1	2	
La Carlota, Negros Occidental	Independent	NUP	10	1	1	4	1					3	
Sagay, Negros Occidental	NUP	NUP	10		2	4	4						
San Carlos, Negros Occidental	NPC	NPC	10	10									
Silay, Negros Occidental	PFP	Independent	10	2				4				4	
Sipalay, Negros Occidental	NPC	NPC	10	6		1	3						
Talisay, Negros Occidental	Lakas	Liberal	10		3		5			2			
Tanjay, Negros Oriental	NPC	Lakas	10	4	1					2		3	
Victorias, Negros Occidental	NPC	NPC	10	9								1	
Total			180	85	18	17	16	11	10	7	1	15	

==== Region VII (Central Visayas) ====
City	Mayor	Vice Mayor	Elected seats	Seats won							Ref.
City	Mayor	Vice Mayor	Elected seats	NP	1Cebu	BAKUD	PFP	NPC	NUP	Ind.	Ref.
Bogo, Cebu	1CEBU	1CEBU	10		9					1	
Carcar, Cebu	Nacionalista	Nacionalista	10	6				3		1	
Danao, Cebu	BAKUD	BAKUD	10			10					
Naga, Cebu	Nacionalista	Nacionalista	10	10							
Tagbilaran, Bohol	PFP	Nacionalista	10	5			5				
Talisay, Cebu	Nacionalista	Nacionalista	10	10							
Toledo, Cebu	1CEBU	1CEBU	10		9				1		
Total			70	31	18	10	5	3	1	2	

==== Region VIII (Eastern Visayas) ====
City	Mayor	Vice Mayor	Elected seats	Seats won						Ref.
City	Mayor	Vice Mayor	Elected seats	NP	NPC	Lakas	PFP	Reporma	Ind.	Ref.
Baybay, Leyte	NPC	NPC	10		10					
Borongan, Eastern Samar	PFP	Lakas	10			1	6		3	
Calbayog, Samar	Nacionalista	Nacionalista	12	12						
Catbalogan, Samar	Nacionalista	Nacionalista	10	9					1	
Maasin, Southern Leyte	Lakas	Nacionalista	10	2		7		1		
Total			52	23	10	8	6	1	4	

==== Region IX (Zamboanga Peninsula) ====
City	Mayor	Vice Mayor	Elected seats	Seats won				Ref.
City	Mayor	Vice Mayor	Elected seats	Lakas	PFP	BUP	NPC	Ref.
Dapitan, Zamboanga del Norte	Lakas	Lakas	10	10				
Dipolog, Zamboanga del Norte	Lakas	Lakas	10	9				
Isabela, Basilan	BUP	BUP	10			10		
Pagadian, Zamboanga del Sur	Lakas	PFP	10		8		2	
Total			40	19	12	7	2	

==== Region X (Northern Mindanao) ====
City	Mayor	Vice Mayor	Elected seats	Seats won							Ref.
City	Mayor	Vice Mayor	Elected seats	AsPin	Lakas	BPP	Padayon	PDP	PFP	Ind.	Ref.
El Salvador, Misamis Oriental	Lakas	Nacionalista	10		8			2			
Gingoog, Misamis Oriental	Lakas	Nacionalista	10		8		2				
Malaybalay, Bukidnon	PFP	Lakas	10		6	1				3	
Oroquieta, Misamis Occidental	Asenso Pinoy	Asenso Pinoy	10	10							
Ozamiz, Misamis Occidental	Asenso Pinoy	Asenso Pinoy	10	10							
Tangub, Misamis Occidental	Asenso Pinoy	Asenso Pinoy	10	10							
Valencia, Bukidnon	Independent	Independent	10			8			1	1	
Total			70	30	22	9	2	2	1	4	

==== Region XI (Davao Region) ====
City	Mayor	Vice Mayor	Elected seats	Seats won					Ref.
City	Mayor	Vice Mayor	Elected seats	Lakas	PFP	NP	Reporma	Ind.	Ref.
Digos, Davao del Sur	Independent	Independent	10			2		8	
Mati, Davao Oriental	Lakas	PFP	10	5	4			1	
Panabo, Davao del Norte	PFP	PFP	10	5	5				
Samal, Davao del Norte	Independent	Independent	12					12	
Tagum, Davao del Norte	Lakas	Reporma	10	9			1		
Total			52	19	9	2	1	21	

==== Region XII (Soccsksargen) ====
City	Mayor	Vice Mayor	Elected seats	Seats won						Ref.
City	Mayor	Vice Mayor	Elected seats	NPC	Lakas	NP	PMP	Aksyon	Ind.	Ref.
Kidapawan, Cotabato	NPC	NPC	10	6		1	2		1	
Koronadal, South Cotabato	PFP	Independent	10	8		1		2		
Tacurong, Sultan Kudarat	Nacionalista	Lakas	10	2	7					
Total			30	16	7	2	2	2	1	

==== Region XIII (Caraga) ====
City	Mayor	Vice Mayor	Elected seats	Seats won						Ref.
City	Mayor	Vice Mayor	Elected seats	NUP	Lakas	NP	PFP	Aksyon	Ind.	Ref.
Bayugan, Agusan del Sur	NUP	NUP	10	10						
Bislig, Surigao del Sur	Nacionalista	Independent	10	1		3	3	2	1	
Cabadbaran, Agusan del Norte	Lakas	Lakas	10		10					
Surigao City, Surigao del Norte	Nacionalista	Nacionalista	10		2	8				
Tandag, Surigao del Sur	PFP	Nacionalista	10	2		1	7			
Total			50	13	12	12	10	2	1	

==== Bangsamoro ====
City	Mayor	Vice Mayor	Elected seats	Seats won				Ref.
City	Mayor	Vice Mayor	Elected seats	Lakas	PFP	NP	UBJP	Ref.
Lamitan, Basilan	PFP	Lakas	10	3	6		1	
Marawi, Lanao del Sur	Lakas	Lakas	10	9		1		
Total			20	12	6	1	1	

== Municipal elections ==
All 1,493 municipalities shall hold elections for its elective offices.

The new municipalities of Kadayangan, Kapalawan, Ligawasan, Malidegao, Nabalawag, Old Kaabakan, Pahamuddin and Tugunan will elect its officials for the first time after their voters approved incorporation in a 2024 plebiscite.

=== Metro Manila ===
Municipality	Mayor	Vice Mayor	Elected seats	Sangguniang Bayan seats won				Ref.
Municipality	Mayor	Vice Mayor	Elected seats	NP	PFP	NUP	KANP	Ref.
Pateros	PFP	Nacionalista	12	8	2	1	1	
Total			12	8	2	1	1	

=== Special Geographic Area (Bangsamoro) ===
Municipality	Mayor	Vice Mayor	Elected seats	Sangguniang Bayan seats won					Ref.
Municipality	Mayor	Vice Mayor	Elected seats	UBJP	SIAP	Aksyon	Lakas	Ind.	Ref.
Kadayangan	UBJP	UBJP	8	3	2			1	
Kapalawan	UBJP	UBJP	8	2				6	
Ligawasan	UBJP	UBJP	8	8					
Malidegao	UBJP	Independent	8			1		7	
Nabalawag	SIAP	SIAP	8	3	1			4	
Old Kaabakan (Note: Although news outlets have not yet updated their transmissions, the municipal boards of canvassers in Old Kaabakan and Tugunan have already proclaimed the election winners.)	SIAP	Independent	8	2	5			1	
Pahamuddin	UBJP	UBJP	8	7			1		
Tugunan	Independent	Independent	8					8	
Total			64	25	8	1	1	29	

=== Others ===
10 Most Populous Municipalities in the Philippines (2024 census)
Municipality	Mayor	Vice Mayor	Elected seats	Seats won									Ref.
Municipality	Mayor	Vice Mayor	Elected seats	NPC	NUP	PFP	Kambilan	Lakas	Aksyon	Akbayan	UNIDO	Ind.	Ref.
Binangonan, Rizal	NPC	NPC	8	5								3	
Cainta, Rizal	NPC	NPC	8	8									
Lubao, Pampanga	Kambilan	Kambilan	8				8						
Marilao, Bulacan	PFP	PFP	8		2	6							
Rodriguez, Rizal	NPC	NPC	8	6		1					1		
San Mateo, Rizal	Liberal	NPC	8	8									
Santa Maria, Bulacan	Lakas	PFP	8			1		7					
Silang, Cavite	NUP	Liberal	8	1	7								
Tanza, Cavite	NUP	Aksyon	8		4				4				
Taytay, Rizal	NPC	NPC	8	6		1				1			
Total			80	34	13	9	8	7	4	1	1	3	

== See also ==
2025 Philippine local elections in:

- Metro Manila
- Cordillera Administrative Region
- Ilocos Region
- Cagayan Valley
- Central Luzon
- Calabarzon
- Mimaropa
- Bicol Region
- Western Visayas
- Negros Island Region
- Central Visayas
- Eastern Visayas
- Zamboanga Peninsula
- Northern Mindanao
- Davao Region
- Soccsksargen
- Caraga
- Bangsamoro
