= Sulu Provincial Board =

Legislative body of the province of Sulu, Philippines

Sulu Provincial Board Sangguniang Panlalawigan ng Sulu

Type
- Type: Unicameral
- Term limits: 3 terms (9 years)

Leadership
- Presiding Officer: Abdulsakur Mahail Tan, Lakas since June 30, 2025

Structure
- Seats: 13 board members 1 ex officio presiding officer
- Political groups: Lakas (10) TBD (1) Nonpartisan (2)
- Length of term: 3 years
- Authority: Local Government Code of the Philippines

Elections
- Voting system: Multiple non-transferable vote (regular members); Indirect election (ex officio members)
- Last election: May 12, 2025
- Next election: May 15, 2028

Meeting place
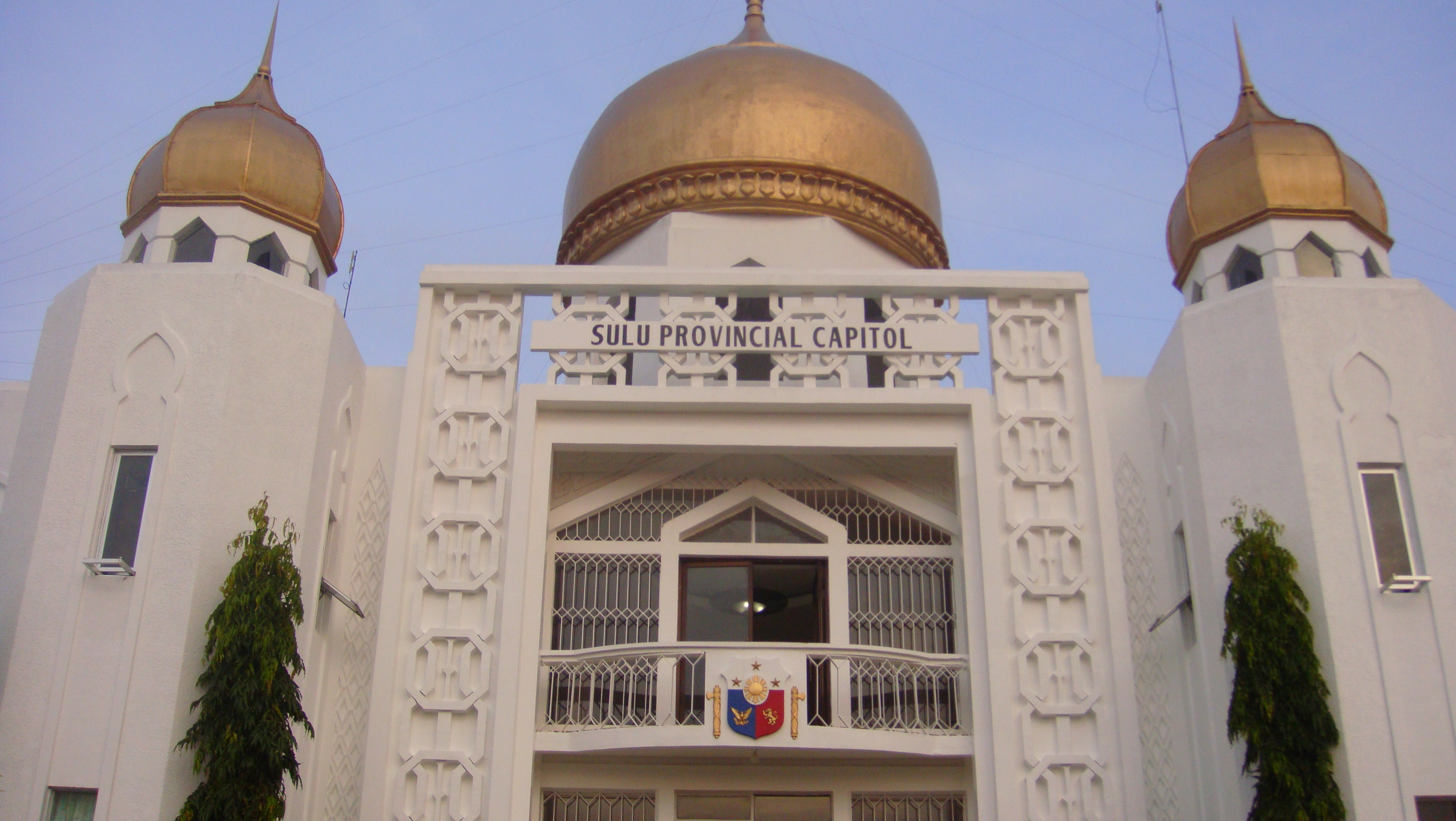
- Sulu Provincial Capitol, Jolo

The Sulu Provincial Board is the Sangguniang Panlalawigan (provincial legislature) of the Philippine province of Sulu.

The members are elected via plurality-at-large voting: the province is divided into two districts, each having five seats. A voter votes up to five names, with the top five candidates per district being elected. The vice governor is the ex officio presiding officer, and only votes to break ties. The vice governor is elected via the plurality voting system province-wide.

The districts used in appropriation of members is coextensive with the legislative districts of Sulu.

Aside from the regular members, the board also includes the provincial federation presidents of the Liga ng mga Barangay (ABC, from its old name "Association of Barangay Captains"), the Sangguniang Kabataan (SK, youth councils) and the Philippine Councilors League (PCL).

== Apportionment ==
| Elections | Seats per district | | Ex officio seats | Total seats |
| Elections | 1st | 2nd | Ex officio seats | Total seats |
|---|---|---|---|---|
| 2010–present | 5 | 5 | 3 | 13 |

== List of members ==
=== Current members ===
These are the members after the 2025 local elections and 2023 barangay and SK elections:

- Vice Governor: Abdulsakur Mahail Tan (Lakas)

| Seat | Board member | Party | Start of term | End of term |
|---|---|---|---|---|
| 1st district | Al-Minzhen Suhuri | Lakas | June 30, 2019 | June 30, 2025 |
| 1st district | Crisanta Hayudini | Lakas | June 30, 2019 | June 30, 2025 |
| 1st district | Charina Isahac | Lakas | June 30, 2022 | June 30, 2025 |
| 1st district | Sulaiman Burahan | Lakas | June 30, 2022 | June 30, 2025 |
| 1st district | Nurshida Karanain | Lakas | June 30, 2022 | June 30, 2025 |
| 2nd district | Nadia Arbison | Lakas | June 30, 2022 | June 30, 2025 |
| 2nd district | Raihana Arbison-Adam | Lakas | June 30, 2022 | June 30, 2025 |
| 2nd district | Nurwina Sahidulla | Lakas | June 30, 2022 | June 30, 2025 |
| 2nd district | Radz Burahan | Lakas | June 30, 2022 | June 30, 2025 |
| 2nd district | Akmadhan Sitin | Lakas | June 30, 2022 | June 30, 2025 |
| ABC | | Nonpartisan | July 30, 2018 | January 1, 2023 |
| PCL | TBD | | | June 30, 2028 |
| SK | | Nonpartisan | June 8, 2018 | January 1, 2023 |
| IPMR | | | | |

=== Vice governor ===
| Election year | Name | Party | Ref. |
|---|---|---|---|
| 2016 | Nurusisah Tan | Liberal | |
| 2019 | Abdusakur Tan, II | PDP–Laban | |
| 2022 | Abdusakur Tan, II | PDP–Laban | |
| 2025 | Abdulsakur Mahail Tan | Lakas | |

=== 1st district ===
- Population (2024):

| Election year | Member (party) | Member (party) | Member (party) | Member (party) | Member (party) | Ref. |
|---|---|---|---|---|---|---|
| 2016 | Alkhadar T. Loong (Liberal) | Butch R. Izquierdo (Liberal) | Ismunlatip Suhuri (Liberal) | Alnakar Tulawie (Liberal) | Basaron M. Burahan (Liberal) | |
| 2019 | Indah Loong-Karanain (PDP–Laban) | Al-Minzhen Suhuri (PDP–Laban) | Crisanta Hayudini (PDP–Laban) | Alnakar Tulawie (PFP) | Charina Isahac (PDP–Laban) | |
| 2022 | Nurshida Karanain (PDP–Laban) | Al-Minzhen Suhuri (PDP–Laban) | Crisanta Hayudini (PDP–Laban) | Sulaiman Burahan (PDP–Laban) | Lovely I. Isahac (PDP–Laban) | |
| 2025 | Nurshida Karanain (Lakas) | Al-Minzhen Suhuri (Lakas) | Crisanta Hayudini (Lakas) | Sulaiman Burahan (Lakas) | Charina Isahac (Lakas) | |

=== 2nd district ===
- Population (2024):

| Election year | Member (party) | Member (party) | Member (party) | Member (party) | Member (party) | Ref. |
|---|---|---|---|---|---|---|
| 2016 | Alniur Arbison (Liberal) | Nasser T. Daud, Jr. (Liberal) | Ayob Pulahong (Liberal) | Raihana Arbison-Adam (Liberal) | Akmadhan Sitin (PDP–Laban) | |
| 2019 | Nadia Alih (Lakas) | Nurwina Sahidulla (PFP) | Rudenhar Anni (PFP) | Raihana Arbison-Adam (Lakas) | Berhamn Imlan (PDP–Laban) | |
| 2022 | Nadia Arbison (PDP–Laban) | Nurwina Sahidulla (PDP–Laban) | Akmadhan Sitin (PDP–Laban) | Raihana Arbison-Adam (PDP–Laban) | Radz Burahan (PDP–Laban) | |
| 2025 | Nadia Arbison (Lakas) | Nurwina Sahidulla (Lakas) | Akmadhan Sitin (Lakas) | Raihana Arbison-Adam (Lakas) | Radz Burahan (Lakas) | |
