= Northern Samar Provincial Board =

Legislative body of the province of Northern Samar, Philippines

Northern Samar Provincial Board Sangguniang Panlalawigan ng Hilagang Samar

Type
- Type: Unicameral
- Term limits: 3 terms (9 years)

History
- Founded: 1967
- Preceded by: Samar Provincial Board

Leadership
- Presiding Officer: Clarence E. Dato, PFP since June 30, 2022

Structure
- Seats: 13 board members 1 ex officio presiding officer
- Political groups: NUP (8) Independent (2) PFP (1) Nonpartisan (2)
- Length of term: 3 years
- Authority: Local Government Code of the Philippines

Elections
- Voting system: Multiple non-transferable vote (regular members); Indirect election (ex officio members)
- Last election: May 12, 2025
- Next election: May 15, 2028

Meeting place
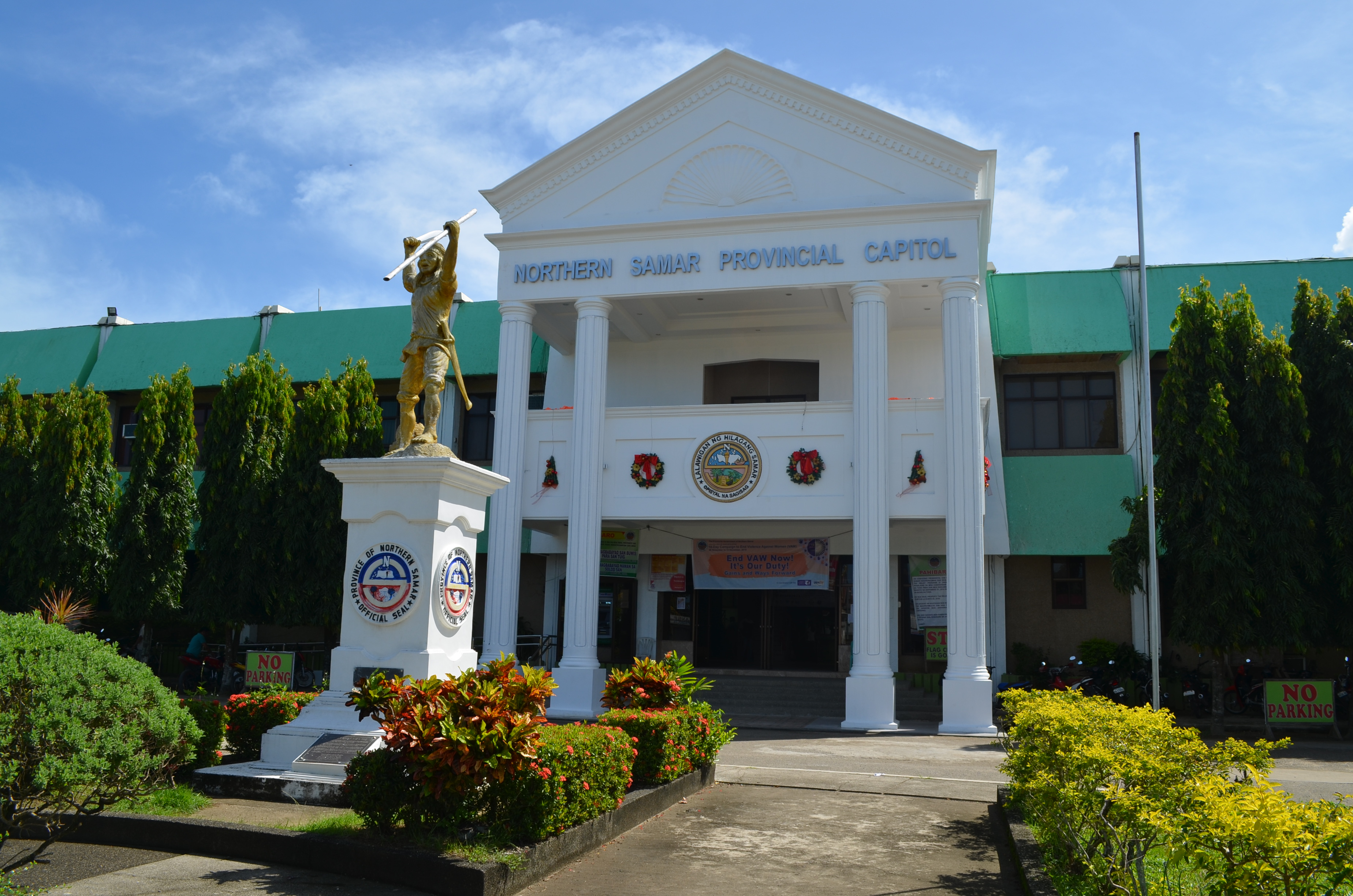
- Northern Samar Provincial Capitol, Catarman

The Northern Samar Provincial Board is the Sangguniang Panlalawigan (provincial legislature) of the Philippine province of Northern Samar.

The members are elected via plurality-at-large voting: the province is divided into two districts, each having five seats. A voter votes up to five names, with the top five candidates per district being elected. The vice governor is the ex officio presiding officer, and only votes to break ties. The vice governor is elected via the plurality voting system province-wide.

The districts used in appropriation of members is coextensive with the legislative districts of Northern Samar.

Aside from the regular members, the board also includes the provincial federation presidents of the Liga ng mga Barangay (ABC, from its old name "Association of Barangay Captains"), the Sangguniang Kabataan (SK, youth councils) and the Philippine Councilors League (PCL).

== History ==
By virtue of Republic Act No. 4221, the majority of voters during the 1965 Samar division plebiscite ratified the division of the old province of Samar into three: Northern Samar, Western Samar, and Eastern Samar. The first local officials of the new provinces, including the provincial board, were elected on November 14, 1967, with the law taking effect, and took office on January 1, 1968.

== Apportionment ==
Elections	Seats per district		Ex officio seats	Total seats
Elections	1st	2nd	Ex officio seats	Total seats
2013–present	5	5	3	13

== List of members ==
=== Current members ===
These are the members after the 2025 local elections and 2023 barangay and SK elections:

- Vice Governor: Clarence E. Dato (PFP)

Seat	Board member	Party	Start of term	End of term
1st district	Lope E. Dorado Jr.	PFP	June 30, 2025	June 30, 2028
1st district	Nadia Bianca Nicolette L. Ong	Independent	June 30, 2025	June 30, 2028
1st district	Floriane D. Uy	NUP	June 30, 2025	June 30, 2028
1st district	Niel S. Hernandez	Independent	June 30, 2025	June 30, 2028
1st district	Victorio M. Singzon II	NUP	June 30, 2022	June 30, 2028
2nd district	Don L. Abalon	NUP	June 30, 2022	June 30, 2028
2nd district	Dionisio Dexter D. Galit	NUP	June 30, 2022	June 30, 2028
2nd district	Gina O. Silvano	NUP	June 30, 2025	June 30, 2028
2nd district	Acela Rufa Andrea J. Gillamac-Layug	NUP	June 30, 2025	June 30, 2028
2nd district	Leonida P. Laodenio	NUP	June 30, 2022	June 30, 2028
ABC	Arturo T. Dubongco Jr.	Nonpartisan		December 31, 2025
PCL	Gina O. Silvano	NUP		June 30, 2028
SK	Gerardo Gerard A. Miranda	Nonpartisan		December 31, 2025

=== Vice governor ===
Election year	Name	Party	Ref.
2016	Gary M. Lavin	Liberal	
2019	Gary M. Lavin	NUP	
2022	Clarence E. Dato	NUP	
2025	Clarence E. Dato	PFP	

=== 1st district ===
- Population (2024):

Election year	Member (party)	Member (party)	Member (party)	Member (party)	Member (party)	Ref.
2016	Neil S. Hernandez (Liberal)	Golda S. Balllesta (Liberal)	Christian Emmanuel Uy (Liberal)	Joma H. Vicario, III (NUP)	Victorio M. Singzon, II (NUP)	
2019	Neil S. Hernandez (Liberal)	Golda S. Balllesta (Liberal)	Christian Emmanuel Uy (Liberal)	Joma H. Vicario, III (PDP–Laban)	Hazel Dela Rosa (Lakas)	
2022	Gilbert F. Layon (Liberal)	Quintin B. Saludaga (NUP)	Christian Emmanuel Uy (NUP)	Victorio M. Singzon, II (NUP)	Liza C. Esidera (NUP)	
2025	Niel S. Hernandez (Independent)	Nadia Bianca Nicolette L. Ong (Independent)	Lope E. Dorado Jr. (PFP)	Victorio M. Singzon, II (NUP)	Floriane D. Uy (NUP)	

=== 2nd district ===
- Population (2024):

Election year	Member (party)	Member (party)	Member (party)	Member (party)	Member (party)	Ref.
2016	Florence Batula (Liberal)	Albert A. Lucero (Liberal)	Dionisio Dexter D. Galit (NUP)	Gina O. Silvano (NUP)	Maritess J. Gillamac (NUP)	
2019	Florence Batula (NUP)	Albert A. Lucero (Liberal)	Mary Ann Abalon (NUP)	Gina O. Silvano (NUP)	Maritess J. Gillamac (NUP)	
2022	Don L. Abalon (NUP)	Albert A. Lucero (NUP)	Dionisio Dexter D. Galit (NUP)	Leonida P. Laudenio (NUP)	Maritess J. Gillamac (NUP)	
2025	Don L. Abalon (NUP)	Gina O. Silvano (NUP)	Dionisio Dexter D. Galit (NUP)	Leonida P. Laudenio (NUP)	Acela Rufa Andrea J. Gillamac-Layug (NUP)	
