= Biliran Provincial Board =

Legislative body of the province of Biliran, Philippines

Biliran Provincial Board Sangguniang Panlalawigan ng Biliran

Type
- Type: Unicameral
- Term limits: 3 terms (9 years)

Leadership
- Presiding Officer: Roselyn E. Paras, Lakas–CMD since June 30, 2025

Structure
- Seats: 11 board members 1 ex officio presiding officer
- Political groups: Nacionalista (5) Lakas–CMD (3) Independent (1) Nonpartisan (2)
- Length of term: 3 years
- Authority: Local Government Code of the Philippines

Elections
- Voting system: Plurality-at-large (regular members); Indirect election (ex officio members)
- Last election: May 12, 2025
- Next election: May 15, 2028

Meeting place
- Biliran Provincial Capitol, Naval

The Biliran Provincial Board is the Sangguniang Panlalawigan (provincial legislature) of the Philippine province of Biliran.

The members are elected via plurality-at-large voting: the province is divided into two districts, each sending four members to the provincial board; the electorate votes for four members, with the four candidates with the highest number of votes being elected. The vice governor is the ex officio presiding officer, and only votes to break ties. The vice governor is elected via the plurality voting system province-wide.

== District apportionment ==
Elections	No. of seats per district		Ex officio seats	Total seats
Elections	1st	2nd	Ex officio seats	Total seats
2004–present	4	4	3	11

== List of members ==
An additional three ex officio members are the presidents of the provincial chapters of the Association of Barangay Captains, the Councilors' League, the Sangguniang Kabataan provincial president; the municipal and city (if applicable) presidents of the Association of Barangay Captains, Councilor's League and Sangguniang Kabataan, shall elect amongst themselves their provincial presidents which shall be their representatives at the board.

=== Current members ===
These are the members after the 2025 local elections and 2023 barangay and SK elections:

- Vice Governor: Roselyn E. Paras (Lakas–CMD)

Seat	Board member	Party	Start of term	End of term
1st district	Brigido C. Caneja III	Lakas–CMD	June 30, 2025	June 30, 2028
1st district	Lucille C. Roa	Nacionalista	June 30, 2025	June 30, 2028
1st district	Miguel J. Cases Jr.	Nacionalista	June 30, 2019	June 30, 2028
1st district	Manolo D. Rubi	Lakas–CMD	June 30, 2025	June 30, 2028
2nd district	Carlos L. Chan	Lakas–CMD	June 30, 2019	June 30, 2028
2nd district	Allan Paul U. Tubis	Nacionalista	June 30, 2019	June 30, 2028
2nd district	Nilo P. Peñaflor	Nacionalista	June 30, 2025	June 30, 2028
2nd district	Lorenzo A. Reveldez Jr.	Independent	June 30, 2025	June 30, 2028
ABC		Nonpartisan	July 30, 2018	January 1, 2023
PCL	Lynn Mckinnery	Nacionalista	July 1, 2019	June 30, 2022
SK		Nonpartisan	June 8, 2018	January 1, 2023

=== Vice Governor ===
Election year	Name	Party	Ref.
2001	Carlos L. Chan		
2004	Carlos L. Chan	Lakas	
2007	Lucila Curso	Lakas	
2010	Manuel Montejo	Lakas–Kampi	
2013	Eriberto Tubis, Jr.	Liberal	
2016	Eriberto Tubis, Jr.	Liberal	
2019	Brigido C. Cañeja III	Nacionalista	
2022	Brigido C. Cañeja III	Nacionalista	
2025	Roselyn Espina-Paras	Lakas	

=== 1st District ===
Election year	Member (party)	Member (party)	Member (party)	Member (party)	Ref.
2004	Lucila Curso (Lakas–CMD)	Elizar Sabitsana (Lakas–CMD)	Getolio Solite (Lakas–CMD)	Ricardo Kho (Lakas–CMD)	
2007	Eden Apolinar (Lakas–CMD)	Elizar Sabitsana (Lakas–CMD)	Getolio Solite (Lakas–CMD)	Ricardo Kho (Lakas–CMD)	
2010	Eden Apolinar (Nacionalista)	Martin Lagat (Lakas-Kampi)	Bebiano Jadulco (Lakas-Kampi)	Brigido Caneja III (Nacionalista)	
2013	Eden Apolinar (Liberal)	Gerard Espina (Liberal)	Bebiano Jadulco (NPC)	Brigido Caneja III (Liberal)	
2016	Brigido C. Cañeja III (UNA)	Victoriano Justin Roa (Liberal)	Ricardo R. Kho (Liberal)	Lando Ty (Liberal)	
2019	Miguel Casas, Jr. (Nacionalista)	Jerome Arcenal (PDP–Laban)	Ricardo R. Kho (Nacionalista)	Lando Ty (Nacionalista)	
2022	Miguel Casas, Jr. (Nacionalista)	Roselyn Espina-Paras (Aksyon)	Ricardo R. Kho (Nacionalista)	Lando Ty (Nacionalista)	
2025	Miguel Casas, Jr. (Nacionalista)	Brigido C. Cañeja III (Lakas)	Lucille Curso-Roa (Nacionalista)	Manolo D. Rubi (Lakas)	

=== 2nd District ===
Election year	Member (party)	Member (party)	Member (party)	Member (party)	Ref.
2004	Eriberto Tubis, Jr. (Lakas–CMD)	Gina Enage (Independent)	Rolando Sabornido (Lakas–CMD)	Orencio Garvacio (Lakas–CMD)	
2007	Eriberto Tubis, Jr. (Lakas–CMD)	Gina Enage (Lakas–CMD)	Rolando Sabornido (Lakas–CMD)	Orencio Garvacio (Lakas–CMD)	
2010	Eriberto Tubis, Jr. (Nacionalista)	Gina Enage (Nacionalista)	Dominador Corpin (Independent)	Lorenzo Reveldez, Jr. (Nacionalista)	
2013	Edgar Igano (Liberal)	Rolando Sabornido (Liberal)	Dominador Corpin (Liberal)	Carlos L. Chan (Independent)	
2016	Dominador Corpin (Liberal)	Gina Maria Enage (Independent)	Berlina Garin (Independent)	Edgar Igano (UNA)	
2019	Carlos L. Chan (PDP–Laban)	Gina Maria Enage (Nacionalista)	Allan Paul Tubis (Nacionalista)	Edgar Igano (PDP–Laban)	
2022	Carlos L. Chan (Nacionalista)	Gina Maria Enage (Nacionalista)	Allan Paul Tubis (Nacionalista)	Grace Casil (Lakas)	
2025	Carlos L. Chan (Lakas–CMD)	Nilo P. Peñaflor (Nacionalista)	Allan Paul Tubis (Nacionalista)	Lorenzo A. Reveldez, Jr. (Independent)	
