= Siquijor Provincial Board =

Legislative body of the province of Siquijor, Philippines

Siquijor Provincial Board Sangguniang Panlalawigan ng Siquijor

Type
- Type: Unicameral
- Term limits: 3 terms (9 years)

Leadership
- Presiding Officer: Dindo A. Tumala, PFP since June 30, 2025

Structure
- Seats: 11 board members 1 ex officio presiding officer
- Political groups: PFP (8) TBD (1) Nonpartisan (2)
- Length of term: 3 years
- Authority: Local Government Code of the Philippines

Elections
- Voting system: Multiple non-transferable vote (regular members); Indirect election (ex officio members)
- Last election: May 12, 2025
- Next election: May 15, 2028

Meeting place
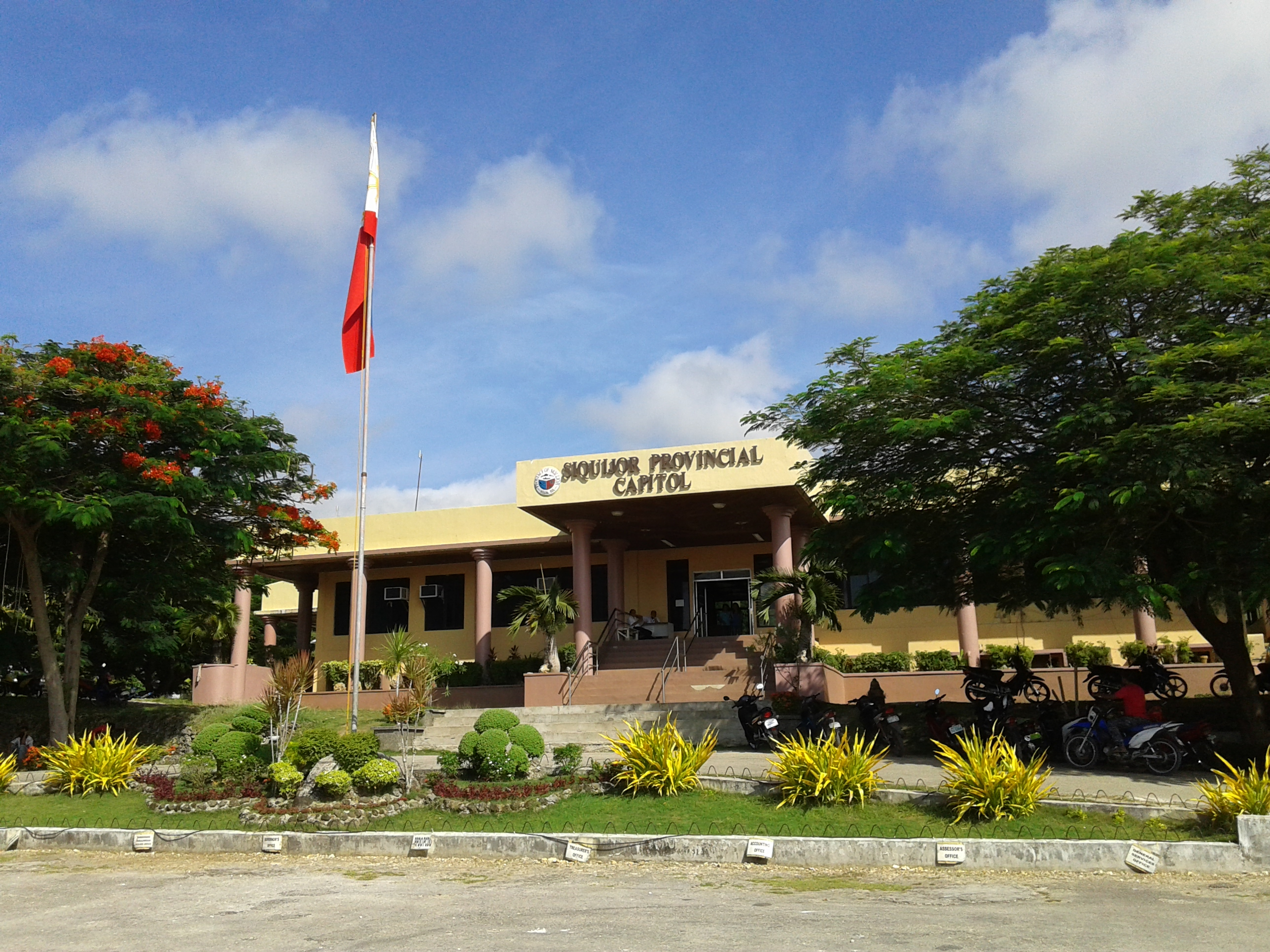
- Siquijor Provincial Capitol, Siquijor

The Siquijor Provincial Board is the Sangguniang Panlalawigan (provincial legislature) of the Philippine province of Siquijor.

The members are elected via plurality-at-large voting: the province is divided into two districts (north and south), each having three seats. A voter votes up to three names, with the top three candidates per district being elected. The vice governor is the ex officio presiding officer, and only votes to break ties. The vice governor is elected via the plurality voting system province-wide.

The districts used in appropriation of members is not coextensive with the legislative district of Siquijor; unlike congressional representation which is at-large, Siquijor is divided into two districts for representation in the Sangguniang Panlalawigan.

Aside from the regular members, the board also includes the provincial federation presidents of the Liga ng mga Barangay (ABC, from its old name "Association of Barangay Captains"), the Sangguniang Kabataan (SK, youth councils) and the Philippine Councilors League (PCL).

== Apportionment ==
Elections	Seats per district		Ex officio seats	Total seats
Elections	1st	2nd	Ex officio seats	Total seats
2010–2025	3	3	3	9
2025–present	4	4	3	11

== List of members ==
=== Current members ===
These are the members after the 2025 local elections and 2023 barangay and SK elections:

- Presiding Officer / Vice Governor: Dindo A. Tumala (PFP)

Seat	Board member	Party	Start of term	End of term
1st district	Brylle Deeiah T. Quio	PFP	June 30, 2022	June 30, 2028
1st district	Teodoro G. Jumawan Jr.	PFP	June 30, 2025	June 30, 2028
1st district	Rene Francisco M. Woo	PFP	June 30, 2025	June 30, 2028
1st district	Erson U. Digal	PFP	June 30, 2022	June 30, 2028
2nd district	Ed Mark C. Baroy	PFP	June 30, 2025	June 30, 2028
2nd district	Rommel O. Dimagnaong	PFP	June 30, 2025	June 30, 2028
2nd district	Irving Roy A. Vios	PFP	June 30, 2025	June 30, 2028
2nd district	Heddah V. Largo	PFP	June 30, 2025	June 30, 2028
ABC	Joseph Lingo-lingo	Nonpartisan	July 30, 2018	January 1, 2023
PCL	Abner Lomongo			June 30, 2028
SK	Christian Ian Cariño	Nonpartisan	July 1, 2022	January 1, 2023

== Past members ==
=== Vice Governors ===
Election year	Name	Party	Ref.
2013	Fernando V. Avanzado	Liberal	
2016	Mei Ling M. Quizon	Liberal	
2019	Mei Ling M. Quizon	NPC	
2022	Mei Ling M. Quizon	NPC	
2025	Dindo A. Tumala	PFP	

=== 1st district ===
- Population (2024):

Election year	Member (party)	Member (party)	Member (party)	Member (party)	Ref.
2016	Cyrus S. Olpoc (Liberal)	Leonardo T. Lingcay (Liberal)	Dar Lynn A. Honrubia (Liberal)	—N/a	
2019	Cyrus S. Olpoc (PDP–Laban)	Leonardo T. Lingcay (PDP–Laban)	Dar Lynn A. Honrubia (PDP–Laban)	—N/a	
2022	Brylle Deeiah T. Quio (PDP–Laban)	Leonardo T. Lingcay (PDP–Laban)	Erson U. Digal (PDP–Laban)	—N/a	
2025	Brylle Deeiah T. Quio (PFP)	Teodoro G. Jumawan Jr. (PFP)	Erson U. Digal (PFP)	Rene Francisco M. Woo (PFP)	

=== 2nd district ===
- Population (2024):

Election year	Member (party)	Member (party)	Member (party)	Member (party)	Ref.
2016	Dindo A. Tumala (Liberal)	Noel O. Monte (Liberal)	Jaime C. Valesco (Liberal)	—N/a	
2019	Dindo A. Tumala (PDP–Laban)	Noel O. Monte (PDP–Laban)	Orville Fua (Independent)	—N/a	
2022	Dindo A. Tumala (PDP–Laban)	Dondon Asok (PDP–Laban)	Orville Fua (Aksyon)	—N/a	
2025	Ed Mark C. Baroy (PFP)	Rommel O. Dimagnaong Jr. (PFP)	Irving Roy A. Vios (PFP)	Heddah V. Largo (PFP)	
