= Apayao Provincial Board =

Legislative body of the province of Apayao, Philippines

Apayao Provincial Board Sangguniang Panlalawigan ng Apayao

Type
- Type: Unicameral
- Term limits: 3 terms (9 years)

Leadership
- Presiding Officer: Kyle Mariah Chelsea S. Bulut-Cunan, Lakas since June 30, 2025

Structure
- Seats: 14 board members 1 ex officio presiding officer
- Political groups: NPC (5) Lakas-CMD (5) TBD (1) Nonpartisan (3)
- Length of term: 3 years
- Authority: Local Government Code of the Philippines

Elections
- Voting system: Plurality-at-large (regular members); Indirect election (ex officio members); Acclamation (sectoral member)
- Last election: May 12, 2025
- Next election: May 15, 2028

Meeting place
- Apayao Capitol, Luna

The Apayao Provincial Board is the Sangguniang Panlalawigan or provincial legislature of the Philippine province of Apayao.

The members are elected via plurality-at-large voting: the province is divided into two districts, each sending four members to the provincial board; the electorate votes for four members, with the four candidates with the highest number of votes being elected. The vice governor is the ex officio presiding officer, and only votes to break ties. The vice governor is elected via the plurality voting system province-wide.

== Seat apportionment ==
Elections	No. of seats per district		Ex officio seats	Reserved seats	Total seats
Elections	1st	2nd	Ex officio seats	Reserved seats	Total seats
2004–2010	4	4	3	—	11
2010–2025	4	4	3	1	12
2025–present	5	5	3	1	14

== List of members ==
An additional three ex officio members are the presidents of the provincial chapters of the Association of Barangay Captains, the Councilors' League, the Sangguniang Kabataan provincial president; the municipal and city (if applicable) presidents of the Association of Barangay Captains, Councilor's League and Sangguniang Kabataan, shall elect amongst themselves their provincial presidents which shall be their representatives at the board.

=== Current members ===
These are the members after the 2025 local elections and 2023 barangay and SK elections:

- Vice Governor: Kyle Mariah Chelsea S. Bulut-Cunan (Lakas)

Seat	Board member	Party	Start of term	End of term
1st district	Alison T. Betat	NPC	June 30, 2022	June 30, 2028
1st district	Rosario B. Labueng	NPC	June 30, 2025	June 30, 2028
1st district	Samuela A. Agnas-Real	Lakas-CMD	June 30, 2019	June 30, 2028
1st district	Vincent S. Talattag	NPC	June 30, 2022	June 30, 2028
1st district	Girlie B. Laylay-uy	Lakas-CMD	June 30, 2025	June 30, 2028
2nd district	Josephine M. Bangsil	NPC	June 30, 2025	June 30, 2028
2nd district	Mailah Haylee L. Ballesteros	Lakas-CMD	June 30, 2019	June 30, 2028
2nd district	Hector Reuel D. Pascua	NPC	June 30, 2025	June 30, 2028
2nd district	Ricky A. Laoat	Lakas-CMD	June 30, 2025	June 30, 2028
2nd district	Vic F. Maruquin	Lakas-CMD	June 30, 2025	June 30, 2028
ABC	Marcial Valiente	Nonpartisan	January 29, 2024	January 1, 2026
PCL				June 30, 2028
SK	Hanz Gerald Palacay	Nonpartisan	December 11, 2023	January 1, 2026
IPMR	John Anthony Amid	Nonpartisan	January 24, 2023	January 24, 2026

=== Vice Governor ===
Election year	Name	Party
1998	Paul Delwasen	
2001	Paul Delwasen	
2004	Paul Delwasen	NPC
2007	Hector Pascua	Lakas
2010	Hector Pascua	Lakas–Kampi
2013	Hector Pascua	Liberal
2016	Remy Albano	Liberal
2019	Remy Albano	Liberal
2022	Remy Albano	KBL
2025	Kyle Mariah Chelsea S. Bulut-Cunan	Lakas

=== 1st District ===
- Municipalities: Calanasan, Conner, Kabugao
- Population (2020): 56,317

Election year	Member (party)	Member (party)	Member (party)	Member (party)	Member (party)
2004	Antonio Deguiom (NPC)	Jaime Amid (NPC)	Dionesio Agudelo (NPC)	Tolentino Mangalad (NPC)	—
2007	Angelo Umingli	Frederick Amid	Sedolito Agunos	Tolentino Mangalao (Lakas-CMD)	—
2010	Angel Umingli (Lakas-Kampi)	Frederick Amid (Lakas-Kampi)	Sedolito Agunos (Lakas-Kampi)	Jose Hortelano (Lakas-Kampi)	—
2013	Angel Umingli (Nacionalista)	Frederick Amid (Liberal)	Sedolito Agunos (Liberal)	Shirley Romero (Nacionalista)	—
2016	Alison Betat (Liberal)	Anton Loui Talimbatog (Liberal)	Tolentino Mangalao (UNA)	Shirley Romero (Liberal)	—
2019	Samuela Real (NPC)	Anton Loui Talimbatog (NPC)	Tolentino Mangalao (NPC)	Shirley Romero (PDP–Laban)	—
2022	Kyle Bulut (NPC)	Alison Betat (NPC)	Vincent Talattag (NPC)	Jun Labueng (Independent)	—
2025	Alison T. Betat (NPC)	Rosario B. Labueng Jr. (NPC)	Samuela A. Agnas-Real (Lakas-CMD)	Vincent S. Talattag (NPC)	Girlie B. Laylay-uy (Lakas-CMD)

=== 2nd District ===
- Municipalities: Flora, Luna, Pudtol, Santa Marcela
- Population (2020): 68,049

Election year	Member (party)	Member (party)	Member (party)	Member (party)	Member (party)
2004	Hector Pascua (NPC)	Emiliano Galleon (NPC)	Elmer Canonizado (NPC)	Mailah Ballesteros (NPC)	—
2007	Bobby Balanay	Remy Albano	Catalina Galleon	Mailah Ballesteros (NPC)	—
2010	Bobby Balanay (Lakas-Kampi)	Remy Albano (Lakas-Kampi)	Catalina Galleon (Lakas-Kampi)	Norman Agonoy (Lakas-Kampi)	—
2013	Bobby Balanay (Liberal)	Remy Albano (Liberal)	Catalina Galleon (Liberal)	Mailah Haylee Ballesteros (NPC)	—
2016	Mcleen Julian (Liberal)	Emiliano Galleon (UNA)	Elmer Molina (Independent)	Mailah Haylee Ballesteros (NPC)	—
2019	Mcleen Julian (Liberal)	Emiliano Galleon (PDP–Laban)	Elmer Molina (PDP–Laban)	Mailah Haylee Ballesteros (NPC)	—
2022	Mcleen Julian (PDP–Laban)	Emiliano Galleon (PDP–Laban)	Elmer Molina (PDP–Laban)	Elmer Canonizado (Independent)	—
2025	Josephine M. Bangsil (NPC)	Mailah Haylee L. Ballesteros (Lakas-CMD)	Hector Reuel D. Pascua (NPC)	Ricky A. Laoat (Lakas-CMD)	Vic F. Maruquin (Lakas-CMD)
