= Eastern Samar Provincial Board =

Legislative body of the province of Eastern Samar, Philippines

Eastern Samar Provincial Board Sangguniang Panlalawigan ng Silangang Samar

Type
- Type: Unicameral
- Term limits: 3 terms (9 years)

History
- Founded: 1967
- Preceded by: Samar Provincial Board

Leadership
- Presiding Officer: Maria Caridad S. Goteesan, PFP since June 30, 2022

Structure
- Seats: 13 board members 1 ex officio presiding officer
- Political groups: PFP (10) Nonpartisan (2)
- Length of term: 3 years
- Authority: Local Government Code of the Philippines

Elections
- Voting system: Multiple non-transferable vote (regular members); Indirect election (ex officio members)
- Last election: May 12, 2025
- Next election: May 15, 2028

Meeting place
- Eastern Samar Sangguniang Panlalawigan Building, Borongan

The Eastern Samar Provincial Board is the Sangguniang Panlalawigan (provincial legislature) of the Philippine province of Eastern Samar.

The members are elected via plurality-at-large voting: the province is divided into two districts, each having five seats. A voter votes up to five names, with the top five candidates per district being elected. The vice governor is the ex officio presiding officer, and only votes to break ties. The vice governor is elected via the plurality voting system province-wide.

The districts used in appropriation of members is not coextensive with the legislative district of Eastern Samar; unlike congressional representation which is at-large, Eastern Samar is divided into two districts for representation in the Sangguniang Panlalawigan.

Aside from the regular members, the board also includes the provincial federation presidents of the Liga ng mga Barangay (ABC, from its old name "Association of Barangay Captains"), the Sangguniang Kabataan (SK, youth councils) and the Philippine Councilors League (PCL).

== History ==
By virtue of Republic Act No. 4221, the majority of voters during the 1965 Samar division plebiscite ratified the division of the old province of Samar into three: Northern Samar, Western Samar, and Eastern Samar. The first local officials of the new provinces, including the provincial board, were elected on November 14, 1967, with the law taking effect, and took office on January 1, 1968.

== Apportionment ==
Elections	Seats per district		Ex officio seats	Total seats
Elections	1st	2nd	Ex officio seats	Total seats
2010–present	5	5	3	13

== List of members ==
=== Current members ===
These are the members after the 2025 local elections

- Vice Governor: Maria Caridad S. Goteesan (PFP)

Seat	Board member	Party	Start of term	End of term
1st district	Philip C. Evardone Jr.	PFP	June 30, 2022	June 30, 2028
1st district	Byron M. Suyot	PFP	June 30, 2022	June 30, 2028
1st district	Virginia R. Zacate	PFP	June 30, 2019	June 30, 2028
1st district	Estanislao N. Quelitano Jr.	PFP	June 30, 2019	June 30, 2028
1st district	Ma. Timotea C. Barizo	PFP	June 30, 2025	June 30, 2028
2nd district	Mark Pol P. Gonzales	PFP	June 30, 2019	June 30, 2028
2nd district	Adel Jo Christelle G. Yadao	PFP	June 30, 20219	June 30, 2028
2nd district	Susana Lourdes B. Gaylon	PFP	June 30, 2022	June 30, 2028
2nd district	Pearl Fatima L. Evardone	PFP	June 30, 2025	June 30, 2025
2nd district	Nesty Anthony R. Cablao	PFP	June 30, 2025	June 30, 2028
ABC	Eloise P. Evardone	Nonpartisan		
PCL	vacant		July 1, 2025	June 30, 2028
SK	Gilberto Germino Jr.	Nonpartisan		

=== Vice Governor ===
Election year	Name	Party	Ref.
2016	Marcelo Ferdinand A. Picardal (until 2017)	Liberal	
2016	Jonas Abuda (since 2017)	Liberal	
2019	Maria Caridad S. Goteesan	PDP–Laban	
2022	Maria Caridad S. Goteesan	PDP–Laban	
2025	Maria Caridad S. Goteesan	PFP	

=== 1st District ===
- Population (2024):

Election year	Member (party)	Member (party)	Member (party)	Member (party)	Member (party)	Ref.
2016	Celestino Cabato (Liberal)	Joji Montallana (Liberal)	Byron M. Suyot (Liberal)	Karen Alvarez (Liberal)	Annabelle A. Capito (Liberal)	
2019	Virginia R. Zacate (PDP–Laban)	Neil M. Alvarez (PDP–Laban)	Estanislao N. Quelitano, Jr. (PDP–Laban)	Karen Alvarez (PDP–Laban)	Annabelle A. Capito (PDP–Laban)	
2022	Virginia R. Zacate (PDP–Laban)	Byron M. Suyot (PDP–Laban)	Estanislao N. Quelitano, Jr. (PDP–Laban)	Philip Evardone, Jr. (PDDS)	Annabelle A. Capito (PDP–Laban)	
2025	Virginia R. Zacate (PFP)	Byron M. Suyot (PFP)	Estanislao N. Quelitano, Jr. (PFP)	Philip Evardone, Jr. (PFP)	Timmy A. Campomanes (PFP)	

=== 2nd District ===
- Population (2024):

Election year	Member (party)	Member (party)	Member (party)	Member (party)	Member (party)	Ref.
2016	Jonas Abuda (until 2017) (Liberal)	Gorgonio B. Cabacaba (Liberal)	Nestonette Cablao (Nacionalista)	Maria Caridad S. Goteesan (Liberal)	Jaime Ty (Liberal)	
2019	Adel Jo Christelle G. Yadao (PDP–Laban)	Mark S. Biong (PDP–Laban)	Nestonette Cablao (Nacionalista)	Mark Pol P. Gonzales (Nacionalista)	Jaime Ty (PDP–Laban)	
2022	Adel Jo Christelle G. Yadao (PDP–Laban)	Melchor L. Mergal (PDP–Laban)	Nestonette Cablao (Aksyon)	Mark Pol P. Gonzales (PDP–Laban)	Susana Lourdes B. Gaylon (PDP–Laban)	
2025	Adel Jo Christelle G. Yadao (PFP)	Pearl Fatima L. Evardone (PFP)	Nesty Anthony R. Cablao (PFP)	Mark Pol P. Gonzales (PFP)	Susana Lourdes B. Gaylon (PFP)	
