= Sarangani Provincial Board =

Legislative body of the province of Sarangani, Philippines

Sarangani Provincial Board Sangguniang Panlalawigan ng Sarangani

Type
- Type: Unicameral
- Term limits: 3 terms (9 years)

Leadership
- Presiding Officer: Danny A. Martinez, PCM since June 30, 2025

Structure
- Seats: 14 board members 1 ex officio presiding officer
- Political groups: PFP (10) TBD (1) Nonpartisan (3)
- Length of term: 3 years
- Authority: Local Government Code of the Philippines

Elections
- Voting system: Multiple non-transferable vote (regular members); Indirect election (ex officio members); Acclamation (sectoral member)
- Last election: May 12, 2025
- Next election: May 15, 2028

Meeting place
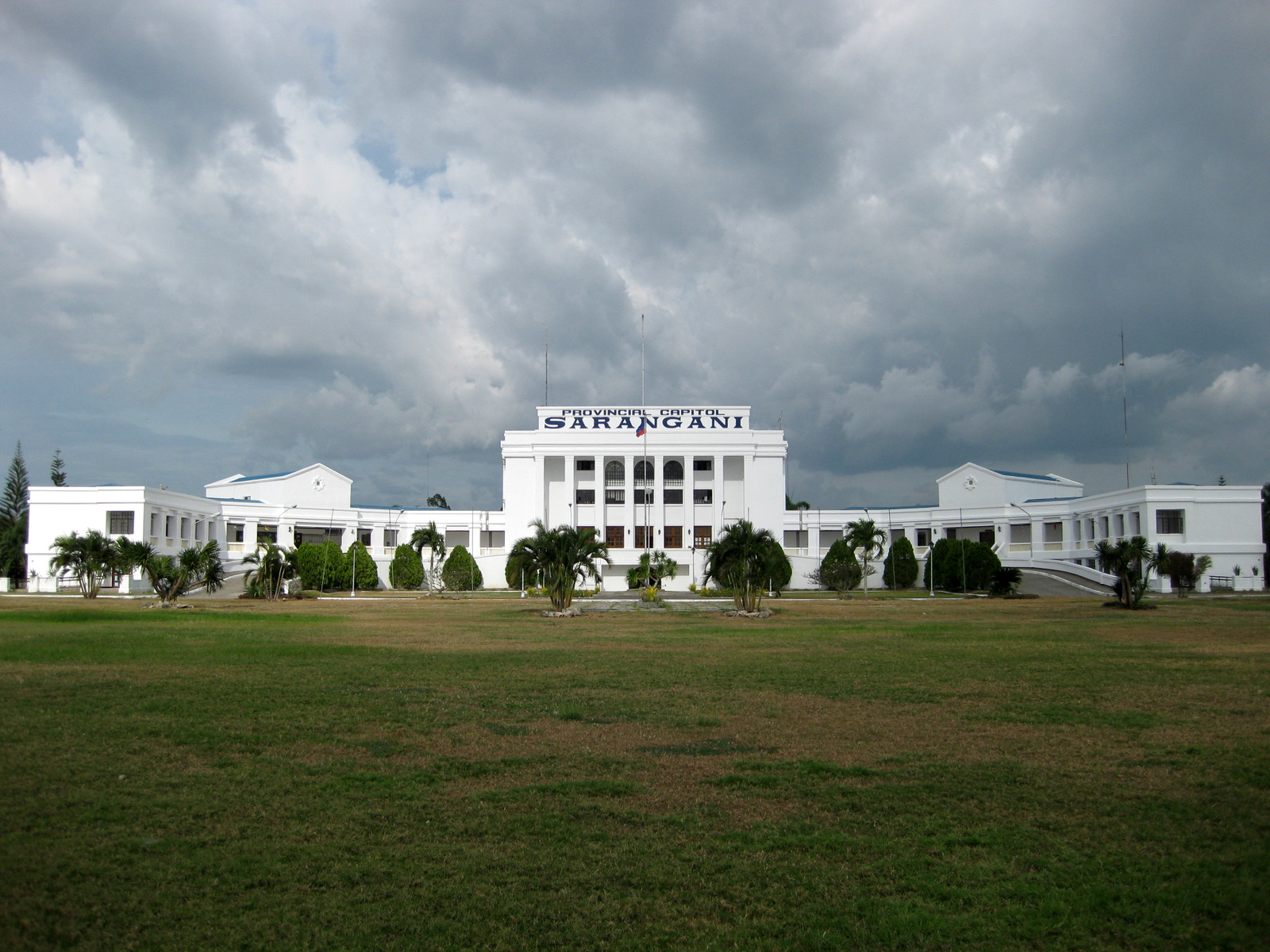
- Sarangani Provincial Capitol, Alabel

The Sarangani Provincial Board is the Sangguniang Panlalawigan (provincial legislature) of the Philippine province of Sarangani .

The members are elected via plurality-at-large voting: the province is divided into two districts, the first district sending four members, and the second district sending six members to the provincial board; the number of candidates the electorate votes for and the number of winning candidates depends on the number of members their district sends. The vice governor is the ex officio presiding officer, and only votes to break ties. The vice governor is elected via the plurality voting system province-wide.

The districts used in appropriation of members is not coextensive with the legislative district of Sarangani; unlike congressional representation which is at-large, Sarangani is divided into two districts for representation in the Sangguniang Panlalawigan.

Aside from the regular members, the board also includes the provincial federation presidents of the Liga ng mga Barangay (ABC, from its old name "Association of Barangay Captains"), the Sangguniang Kabataan (SK, youth councils) and the Philippine Councilors League (PCL). Sarangani's provincial board also has a reserved seat for its indigenous people (IPMR).

== Apportionment ==
Elections	Seats per district		Ex officio seats	Reserved seats	Total seats
Elections	1st	2nd	Ex officio seats	Reserved seats	Total seats
2010–present	4	6	3	1	14

== List of members ==
=== Current members ===
These are the members after the 2025 local elections and 2023 barangay and SK elections

- Vice Governor: Danny A. Martinez (PCM)

Seat	Board member	Party	Start of term	End of term
1st district	Elmer T. De Peralta	PFP	June 30, 2025	June 30, 2028
1st district	Cornelio C. Martinez Jr.	PFP	June 30, 2025	June 30, 2028
1st district	Arnold R. Abequibel	PFP	June 30, 2022	June 30, 2028
1st district	Tito T. Balazon	PFP	June 30, 2025	June 30, 2028
2nd district	Ephrahim P. Galzote	PFP	June 30, 2019	June 30, 2028
2nd district	Irish Louie D. Arnado	PFP	June 30, 2019	June 30, 2028
2nd district	Joseph M. Calanao	PFP	June 30, 2019	June 30, 2028
2nd district	Gwynn L. Singcoy	PFP	June 30, 2022	June 30, 2028
2nd district	Jose Tranquilino L. Ruiz	PFP	June 30, 2019	June 30, 2028
2nd district	Corazon S. Grafilo	PFP	June 30, 2019	June 30, 2028
ABC	Umbra Pangolima	Nonpartisan	August 31, 2021	January 1, 2023
PCL	TBD			June 30, 2028
SK	Rheymar Dian	Nonpartisan	June 8, 2018	January 1, 2023
IPMR	Benjamin Donato	Nonpartisan	June 11, 2022	June 11, 2025

=== Vice governor ===
Election year	Name	Party	Ref.
2016	Elmer T. De Peralta	PCM	
2019	Elmer T. De Peralta	PCM	
2022	Elmer T. De Peralta	PCM	
2025	Danny A. Martinez	PCM	

=== 1st district ===
- Population (2024):

Election year	Member (party)	Member (party)	Member (party)	Member (party)	Ref.
2016	George F. Falgui (PCM)	Cornelio C. Martinez, Jr. (PCM)	Jess C. Bascuña (PCM)	Rosemarie M. Sayo (PCM)	
2019	George F. Falgui (PCM)	Russel Jamora (PCM)	Jess C. Bascuña (PCM)	Rosemarie M. Sayo (PCM)	
2022	Arnold R. Abequibel (PCM)	Russel Jamora (PCM)	Jess C. Bascuña (PCM)	Rosemarie M. Sayo (PCM)	
2025	Arnold R. Abequibel (PFP)	Cornelio C. Martinez, Jr. (PFP)	Elmer T. De Peralta (PFP)	Tito T. Balazon (PFP)	

=== 2nd district ===
- Population (2024):

Election year	Member (party)	Member (party)	Member (party)	Ref.
2016	Cyril John Rustico G. Yap (PCM)	Hermie C. Galzote (PCM)	Virgilio C. Tobias (PCM)	
2016	Arman U. Gulli (PCM)	Cesar B. Nallos, Jr. (PCM)	Abdulracman K. Pangolima (PCM)	
2019	Irish Louie D. Arnado (PCM)	Ephraim Galzote (PCM)	Joseph M. Calanao (PCM)	
2019	Arman U. Gulli (PCM)	Corazon S. Grafilo (PCM)	Jose Tranquilino L. Ruiz (PCM)	
2022	Irish Louie D. Arnado (PCM)	Ephraim Galzote (PCM)	Joseph M. Calanao (PCM)	
2022	Gwynn L. Singcoy (PCM)	Corazon S. Grafilo (PCM)	Jose Tranquilino L. Ruiz (PCM)	
2025	Irish Louie D. Arnado (PFP)	Ephraim Galzote (PFP)	Joseph M. Calanao (PFP)	
2025	Gwynn L. Singcoy (PFP)	Corazon S. Grafilo (PFP)	Jose Tranquilino L. Ruiz (PFP)	
