= South Cotabato Provincial Board =

Legislative body of the province of South Cotabato, Philippines

South Cotabato Provincial Board Sangguniang Panlalawigan ng Timog Cotabato

Type
- Type: Unicameral
- Term limits: 3 terms (9 years)

Leadership
- Presiding Officer: Arthur Pingoy Jr., PFP since June 30, 2022

Structure
- Seats: 14 board members 1 ex officio presiding officer
- Political groups: PFP (11) Nonpartisan (3)
- Committees: Standing Committees of the Provincial Board
- Length of term: 3 years
- Authority: Local Government Code of the Philippines

Elections
- Voting system: Multiple non-transferable vote (regular members); Indirect election (ex officio members); Acclamation (sectoral member)
- Last election: May 12, 2025
- Next election: May 15, 2028

Meeting place
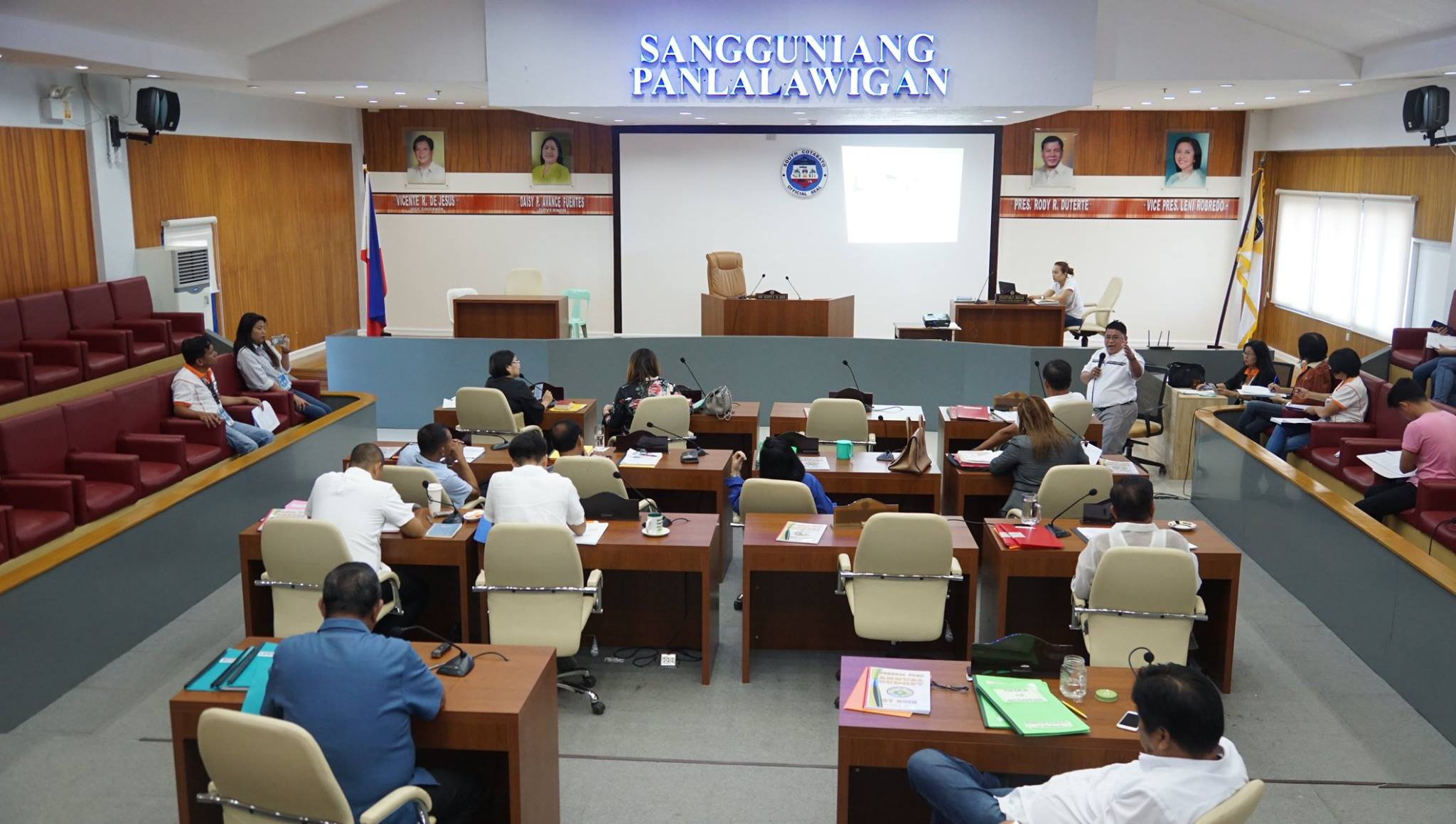
- South Cotabato Provincial Capitol, Koronadal

The South Cotabato Provincial Board is the Sangguniang Panlalawigan (provincial legislature) of the Philippine province of South Cotabato.

The members are elected via plurality-at-large voting: the province is divided into two districts, the first district sending three members, and the second district sending seven members to the provincial board; the number of candidates the electorate votes for and the number of winning candidates depends on the number of members their district sends. The vice governor is the ex officio presiding officer, and only votes to break ties. The vice governor is elected via the plurality voting system province wide.

The districts used in appropriation of members is coextensive with the legislative districts of South Cotabato.

Aside from the regular members, the board also includes the provincial federation presidents of the Liga ng mga Barangay (ABC, from its old name "Association of Barangay Captains"), the Sangguniang Kabataan (SK, youth councils) and the Philippine Councilors League (PCL). South Cotabato's provincial board also has a reserved seat for its indigenous people (IPMR).

== Apportionment ==
Elections	Seats per district			Ex officio seats	Reserved seats	Total seats
Elections	1st	2nd	3rd	Ex officio seats	Reserved seats	Total seats
2010–2025	3	7	—	3	1	14
2025–present	3	3	4	3	1	14

== List of members ==
=== Current members ===
These are the members after the 2025 local elections and 2023 barangay and SK elections

- Vice Governor: Arthur Y. Pingoy Jr. (PFP)

Seat	Board member	Party	Start of term	End of term
1st district	Rubi D. Hatulan-Navarro	PFP	June 30, 2025	June 30, 2028
1st district	Noel J. Escobillo	PFP	June 30, 2019	June 30, 2028
1st district	Nilda B. Almencion	PFP	June 30, 2022	June 30, 2028
2nd district	Annabelle G. Pingoy	PFP	June 30, 2025	June 30, 2028
2nd district	Marie Antonina I. Hurtado	PFP	June 30, 2022	June 30, 2028
2nd district	Cecile E. Diel	PFP	June 30, 2022	June 30, 2028
3rd district	Alicia Nicole C. Causing (Note: Appointed by President Bongbong Marcos to replace her mother, Lyndale Causing, who died in office on June 10, 2023.)	PFP	October 24, 2023	June 30, 2028
3rd district	Ervin B. Luntao	PFP	June 30, 2022	June 30, 2028
3rd district	Ross G. Rosal	PFP	June 30, 2025	June 30, 2028
3rd district	Sarse C. Atam Jr.	PFP	June 30, 2025	June 30, 2028
ABC	Neil Ryan Escobillo	Nonpartisan	January 12, 2024	December 31, 2025
PCL	Rebb Tamayo	PFP	September 16, 2025	June 30, 2028
SK	Vincent Figueroa	Nonpartisan	January 12, 2024	December 31, 2025
IPMR	Edgar Sambog	Nonpartisan	February 12, 2018	February 12, 2021

=== Vice governor ===
Election year	Name	Party	Ref.
2016	Vicente De Jesus	Liberal	
2019	Vicente De Jesus	PDP–Laban	
2022	Arthur Y. Pingoy Jr.	PFP	
2025	Arthur Y. Pingoy Jr.	PFP	

=== 1st district ===
- Population (2024):

Election year	Member (party)	Member (party)	Member (party)	Ref.
2016	Gly Mariano-Trabado (Liberal)	Eamon Gabriel Matti (NPC)	Romeo S. Tamayo (NPC)	
2019	Gly Mariano-Trabado (PDP–Laban)	Eamon Gabriel Matti (PDP–Laban)	Noel J. Escobillo (PFP)	
2022	Nilda B. Almencion (PFP)	Alan M. Ines (PDP–Laban)	Noel J. Escobillo (PFP)	
2025	Nilda B. Almencion (PFP)	Rubi D. Hatulan-Navarro (PFP)	Noel J. Escobillo (PFP)	

=== 2nd district ===
- Population (2024):

Election year	Member (party)	Member (party)	Member (party)	Member (party)	Ref.
2016	Ellen Grace N. Subre-Albios (Liberal)	Ester M. Catorce (Liberal)	Agustin D. Dema-ala (Liberal)	Hilario L. De Pedro, III (NPC)	
2016	Cecile Diel (NPC)	Romulo O. Solivio Sr. (NPC)	Dardanilo Dar (NPC)	—N/a	
2019	Ellen Grace N. Subre-Albios (NPC)	Ester M. Catorce (PDP–Laban)	Daisy Avance-Fuentes (NPC)	Hilario L. De Pedro, III (NPC)	
2019	Antonio G. Fungan Jr. (PDP–Laban)	Henry L. Ladot (NPC)	Dardanilo Dar (NPC)	—N/a	
2022	Cecile E. Diel (PFP)	Marie Antonina I. Hurtado (PFP)	Ervin B. Luntao (PFP)	Miguel Matinong (PFP)	
2022	Lyndale Marietta Causing (until 2023) (PFP)	Junette Ines Hurtado (PFP)	Dardanilo Dar (PDP–Laban)	—N/a	
2022	Alicia Nicole C. Causing (since 2023) (PFP)	Junette Ines Hurtado (PFP)	Dardanilo Dar (PDP–Laban)	—N/a	
2025	Annabelle G. Pingoy (PFP)	Marie Antonina I. Hurtado (PFP)	Cecile E. Diel (PFP)	—N/a	

=== 3rd district ===
- Population (2024):

Election year	Member (party)	Member (party)	Member (party)	Member (party)	Ref.
2025	Alicia Nicole C. Causing (PFP)	Ervin B. Luntao (PFP)	Ross G. Rosal (PFP)	Sarse C. Atam Jr. (PFP)	
