= Sultan Kudarat Provincial Board =

Legislative body of the province of Sultan Kudarat, Philippines

Sultan Kudarat Provincial Board Sangguniang Panlalawigan ng Sultan Kudarat

Type
- Type: Unicameral
- Term limits: 3 terms (9 years)

Leadership
- Presiding Officer: Prince Raden M. Sakaluran, Lakas since June 30, 2022

Structure
- Seats: 13 board members 1 ex officio presiding officer
- Political groups: Lakas (10)
- Length of term: 3 years
- Authority: Local Government Code of the Philippines

Elections
- Voting system: Multiple non-transferable vote (regular members); Indirect election (ex officio members)
- Last election: May 15, 2025
- Next election: 2028

Meeting place
- Legislative Building, Provincial Capitol Compound, Isulan, Sultan Kudarat, Philippines

The Sultan Kudarat Provincial Board is the Sangguniang Panlalawigan (provincial legislature) of the Philippine province of Sultan Kudarat.

The members are elected via plurality-at-large voting: the province is divided into two districts, each having five seats. A voter votes up to five names, with the top five candidates per district being elected. The vice governor is the ex officio presiding officer, and only votes to break ties. The vice governor is elected via the plurality voting system province-wide.

The districts used in appropriation of members is coextensive with the legislative districts of Sultan Kudarat.

Aside from the regular members, the board also includes the provincial federation presidents of the Liga ng mga Barangay (ABC, from its old name "Association of Barangay Captains"), the Sangguniang Kabataan (SK, youth councils) and the Philippine Councilors League (PCL).

== Apportionment ==
Elections	Seats per district		Ex officio seats	Total seats
Elections	1st	2nd	Ex officio seats	Total seats
2010–present	5	5	3	13

== List of members ==
=== Current members ===
These are the members after the 2025 local elections and 2023 barangay and SK elections:

- Vice Governor: Prince Raden M. Sakaluran^{1} (Lakas)

Seat	Board member	Party	Start of term	End of term
1st district	Ian Jordan G. Abalos^{2}	Lakas	June 30, 2022	June 30, 2028
1st district	Jovita M. Duque	Lakas	June 30, 2019	June 30, 2028
1st district	Jose Remos P. Segura	Lakas	June 30, 2019	June 30, 2028
1st district	Elias S. Segura Jr.	Lakas	June 30, 2025	June 30, 2028
1st district	Ernest Patrick V. Matias	Lakas	June 30, 2025	June 30, 2028
2nd district	Jonalette E. De Pedro	Lakas	June 30, 2025	June 30, 2028
2nd district	Glecy D. Fornan	Lakas	June 30, 2019	June 30, 2028
2nd district	Maria Loida D. De Manuel	Lakas	June 30, 2022	June 30, 2028
2nd district	Soriel S. Lib-atin	Lakas	June 30, 2022	June 30, 2028
2nd district	Amil A. Pangansayan	Lakas	June 30, 2022	June 30, 2028
ABC		Nonpartisan	July 30, 2018	January 1, 2023
PCL	TBD			June 30, 2028
SK		Nonpartisan	June 8, 2018	January 1, 2023

1. Replaced Vice Governor Ramon Abalos (PDP–Laban) who died on November 30, 2019.
2. Replaced Jose Segura who became vice governor on Ramon Abalos's death.

=== Vice governor ===
Election year	Name	Party	Ref.
2016	Prince Raden M. Sakaluran	Partidong Tinig ng Masa	
2019	Ramon M. Abalos (until November 30, 2019)	PDP–Laban	
2019	Jose Remos P. Segura (since November 30, 2019)	PDP–Laban	
2022	Prince Raden M. Sakaluran	Lakas	
2025	Prince Raden M. Sakaluran	Lakas	

=== 1st district ===
- Population (2024):

Election year	Member (party)	Member (party)	Member (party)	Member (party)	Member (party)	Ref.
2016	Eduardo Duque (PTM)	Jose Remos P. Segura (PTM)	Joseph Leo Recinto (PTM)	Cyrus E. Torreña (PTM)	Alfonso S. Demasuay (PTM)	
2019	Jovita M. Duque (PDP–Laban)	Jose Remos P. Segura (until November 30, 2019) (PDP–Laban)	Arnold A. Guerrero (PDP–Laban)	Ernesto F. Matias (PDP–Laban)	Alfonso S. Demasuay (PDP–Laban)	
2022	Jovita M. Duque (Lakas)	Jose Remos P. Segura (Lakas)	Ian Jordan G. Abalos (Lakas)	Ernesto F. Matias (Lakas)	Alfonso S. Demasuay (Lakas)	
2025	Jovita M. Duque (Lakas)	Jose Remos P. Segura (Lakas)	Ian Jordan G. Abalos (Lakas)	Ernest Patrick V. Matias (Lakas)	Elias S. Segura, Jr. (Lakas)	

=== 2nd district ===
- Population (2024):

Election year	Member (party)	Member (party)	Member (party)	Member (party)	Member (party)	Ref.
2016	Neser Nesthur Ray Gumana (Liberal)	Cesar Fornan (PTM)	Joseph M. Ortiz (PTM)	Linda L. Latog (PTM)	Rene C. De Manuel, Sr. (PTM)	
2019	Gerardo Delasan (PDP–Laban)	Glecy D. Fornan (Independent)	Joseph M. Ortiz (PDP–Laban)	Linda L. Latog (PDP–Laban)	Rene C. De Manuel, Sr. (PDP–Laban)	
2022	Amil A. Pangansayan (Lakas)	Glecy D. Fornan (Lakas)	Soriel S. Lib-atin (Lakas)	Linda L. Latog (Lakas)	Maria Loida D. De Manuel (Lakas)	
2025	Amil A. Pangansayan (Lakas)	Glecy D. Fornan (Lakas)	Soriel S. Lib-atin (Lakas)	Jonalette E. De Pedro (Lakas)	Maria Loida D. De Manuel (Lakas)	
