= Union of Local Authorities of the Philippines =

- Headquarters: 28th Floor Unit 2803 Summit One Tower Building, 530 Shaw Boulevard, Mandaluyong, Philippines
- Website: www.ulap.net.ph

The Union of Local Authorities of the Philippines (ULAP) is the umbrella organization of all leagues of local government units (LGUs) and locally elected government officials, and was formed in 1998, registered in 1999, and further endorsed through Executive Order 351, series of 2004.

Prior to its creation, ULAP was called the "League of Leagues", which played an important convening role for the local governments to lobby and develop the Local Government Code of 1991. ULAP was created to convene and represent its member leagues and local governments to national and sub-national policy and program committees in continuous pursuit of strengthening and capacitating LGUs for local autonomy and good governance.

== History ==
In September 1998, the idea to revive and strengthen the umbrella organization for all the Leagues of LGU’s and local officials throughout the country was hatched in a meeting initiated by the Department of the Interior and Local Government. Two weeks later, a Resolution was made that changed the name of League of Leagues, which was established on May 5, 1997, to the Union of Local Authorities of the Philippines (ULAP) in order to give it a distinct personality as an associate member of the International Union of Local Authorities (IULA) and to register the same with the Securities and Exchange Commission. Executive Order No.351 was issued on August 17, 2004 that recognized the Union of Local Authorities of the Philippines as the umbrella organization of all the Leagues and Federations of local elective and appointed officials.

== Legal Basis ==
- Executive Order No. 351, s. 2004
- DILG MC No. 99-06 DTD January 7, 1999

== Mission ==
To unite all member leagues, enhance their partnership with all stakeholders to attain local genuine local autonomy for all LGUs, and ensure the smooth and efficient delivery of basic services to local communities for authentic and humane governance.

== Vision ==
ULAP envisions a just, equitable and progressive society anchored on participatory democracy and pro-poor framework of effective a good governance vital to national development and progress,

== Strategy ==
Consistent with the national government’s Philippine Development Plan and the PPP Strategy, ULAP urges a strategic bottom-up approach in governance, for the national government to energize and support the local government sector to accomplish development goals in the local levels. It strongly believes that, to improve the delivery of services and to achieve “inclusive growth”, stronger national and local government coordination must be realized. In this strategy, ULAP envisions:

• To be a venue for transformative governance at the local level

• Serve as catalyst to localize national development

• To bridge various stakeholders to gather capacity and various resources

== Member leagues ==
- League of Provinces of the Philippines (LPP)
- League of Cities of the Philippines (LCP)
- League of Municipalities of the Philippines (LMP)
- Liga ng mga Barangay (LnB)
- League of Vice Governors of the Philippines (LVGP)
- Vice Mayors League of the Philippines (VMLP)
- Provincial Board Members League of the Philippines (PBMLP)
- Philippine Councilors League (PCL)
- Lady Local Legislators' League (4L)
- National Movement of Young Legislators (NMYL)

== Former presidents ==
This is a list of presidents since 1998:

- 1998–2001: Joey Lina, governor of Laguna
- 2001–2004: Rodolfo del Rosario, governor of Davao del Norte
- 2004–2007: Erico Aumentado, governor of Bohol
- 2007–2010: Benjamin Abalos Jr., mayor of Mandaluyong
- 2010–2016: Alfonso Umali, governor of Oriental Mindoro
- 2016–2019: Al Francis Bichara, governor of Albay
- 2019–2022: Dakila Cua, governor of Quirino
- 2022–2025: Reynaldo Tamayo Jr., governor of South Cotabato
- 2025–present: Dakila Cua, governor of Quirino
