= 2028 Philippine barangay and Sangguniang Kabataan elections =

Philippine local elections

2028 Philippine barangay elections
- November 13, 2028

336,080 seats (42,010 barangay captains and 294,070 barangay councilors) Per barangay: 5 in the Sangguniang Barangay seats needed for a majority
Liga ng mga Barangay National President before election
Jessica Dy
Elected Liga ng mga Barangay National President
TBD
- 2028 Philippine Sangguniang Kabataan elections
- November 13, 2028

336,080 seats (42,010 Sangguniang Kabataan chairpersons and 294,070 Sangguniang Kabataan councilors) Per barangay: 4 in the Sangguniang Kabataan seats needed for a majority

Barangay and Sangguniang Kabataan elections (BSKE) in the Philippines are scheduled to be held on November 13, 2028. The elections will determine all 42,010 barangay captains and 294,070 barangay councilors, for a total of 336,080 seats. Five seats in each Sangguniang Barangay (barangay council) are needed for a majority. Barangays are the smallest type of local government unit in the Philippines, and their governance is nonpartisan.

Elections for the local youth councils, Sangguniang Kabataan (SK), will be held at the same time. The youth will elect an SK chairperson and seven SK councilors in each barangay. The SK chairperson will automatically serve as an ex officio member of the Sangguniang Barangay. Members of the Sangguniang Barangay designated as Indigenous Peoples Mandatory Representatives (IPMRs) are not elected as part of the BSKE.

The elections were originally scheduled to be held on December 1, 2025, but were postponed to November 2, 2026, under a law signed by President Bongbong Marcos. They were later postponed again to November 13, 2028.

== Electoral system ==
Each barangay has an elected chief executive, the barangay captain, and an eight-seat legislature, the Sangguniang Barangay, of which seven are elected at-large in this election.

Voters aged 15 to 30 years old on election day also elect among themselves the Sangguniang Kabataan chairperson in each barangay, who is the eighth member of the Sangguniang Barangay, and all seven members of the SK at-large.

Both the barangay captain and the SK chairperson are elected via the first-past-the-post system, while the legislators are elected via multiple non-transferable votes. All elected officials shall serve four-year terms.

Barangay-level elections are nonpartisan elections. Slates of candidates for barangay captain and seven councilors, and an SK chairman and SK councilors, are common; a slate of barangay and SK candidates may cross-endorse each other. Political parties allegedly clandestinely support their candidates despite the nonpartisan nature of the election.

Upon their election, barangay captains shall elect their cities' or municipalities' Liga ng mga Barangay (lit. 'league of the barangays') president, previously known and still known as the "Association of Barangay Captains" or ABC president, who also sits on their respective local municipal or city council. The municipal and city ABC presidents in a province shall elect among themselves a provincial ABC president who also sits on the provincial board. The provincial and independent city ABC chairmen shall elect among themselves the national leadership of the League.

Unlike the barangay captains, who have their own national federation, the SK chairpersons do not have such an equivalent body after its reformation in 2018.

== Preparation ==
The 2023 Philippine barangay and Sangguniang Kabataan elections were originally scheduled to be held in 2022 but were postponed to October 2023 with subsequent elections held in three-year intervals; this meant that after the 2023 elections, the next would have been held in 2026. A Supreme Court decision in June 2023 declared the law postponing the election to 2023 to be unconstitutional but still ordered the 2023 elections to continue, with the next elections in 2025, then every three years thereafter.

=== Postponement to 2026 ===
In June 2024, the Commission on Elections said it would benefit the commission if the barangay elections were postponed to 2026, to prevent the barangay elections from being held in the same year as the general election. Speaker Martin Romualdez filed a bill proposing a six-year term for barangay officials, for a maximum of two consecutive terms, with current officials' terms extended to 2029. In November 2024, Senator Imee Marcos sponsored a bill postponing the election to 2029, then every six years thereafter. Marcos explained that a longer term shall give barangay officials the opportunity to "deepen their understanding of both national and local issues, as well as implement their own medium- and long-term initiatives," aside from the fact that the barangay elections "will never coincide with the national and local elections".

An updated Senate bill saw barangay officials' terms set to four years, with the officials elected in 2023 serving until 2027, and in holdover capacity from 2025 onwards. A House bill has barangay officials' terms set to six years, with barangay incumbents serving until 2029. Quezon City–6th district representative Marivic Co-Pilar sponsored the House bill. Romulo Macalintal, the same lawyer who successfully sued the constitutionality of the previous postponement law, and the Legal Network for Truthful Elections both opposed further postponements.

On April 21, 2025, the commission released its calendar for the barangay elections, setting the date on December 1. By June 12, both chambers of Congress had ratified the bicameral conference committee version of setting barangay officials' terms to four years and up to two reelections, with SK officials' terms to four years with no reelection, and postponing the 2025 elections to November 2026. Because of the developments on the bill, the commission suspended voter registration, setting it from July to October after the 2025 Bangsamoro Parliament election.

In distinguishing Republic Act No. 11935, the law that was struck down as unconstitutional, from the bill awaiting the president's signature, Senator Imee Marcos said that RA 11935 extended the term of the incumbent when postponing the election to a later date, while the current bill, aside from postponing the election, definitely set the term of office and term limits for barangay and SK officials. Macalintal countered that the bill extended "their tenure without a public mandate."

By August, COMELEC chairman George Garcia said that they had been informed that President Marcos would sign the bill into law postponing the election on August 12, 2025. On August 14, President Marcos signed the bill into law, postponing the elections to November 2026, extending incumbents' terms up to that time, extending upcoming officials' terms to four years from three, with still two reelections, except for SK officials who have no reelection. Lawyer Romulo Macalintal, the same person who successfully sued to declare the prior postponement law unconstitutional, sued anew over this law's constitutionality, arguing that the Supreme Court's requirement that there should be an "important, substantial, or compelling reason" for the postponement was not followed.

In November 2025, the Supreme Court dismissed Macalintal's petition, affirming the elections' postponement to December 2026.

=== Postponement to 2028 ===
With inflation caused by the 2026 Iran war, Negros Occidental–3rd district representative Albee Benitez said in April 2026 that he would file a bill to postpone the election by six months. President Marcos said he was open to postponing the elections. The National Movement for Free Elections opposed further postponements. Senator Sherwin Gatchalian rejected postponing the election, saying that Congress cannot postpone elections at will. Meanwhile, Senator Erwin Tulfo supported the measure for practicality, while Senator JV Ejercito expressed caution over whether the Supreme Court would allow the "temporary suspension." A few days later, Senator Imee Marcos filed a bill postponing the elections to October 2027, citing inflation and the fact that the 2026 elections fall on All Souls' Day.

In August 2026, the Philippine Senate Committee on Electoral Reforms and People's Participation approved two bills: Senator Marcos's bill to postpone the election to October 2027, and Senator Francis Escudero's bill to extend the terms of barangay officials to five years. On September 8, the House of Representatives approved on third reading a bill postponing the election to November 2028 and extending the terms of barangay officials to five years. On September 14, the Senate approved on third reading a bill with practically the same provisions as the House-approved bill. Later that week, the House of Representatives adopted the Senate's version of the bill, presumably to save time. Macalintal then wrote to President Marcos to veto the bill postponing the election. President Marcos signed Republic Act No. 12326 into law on September 24, amending Republic Act No. 12232 and postponing the elections to November 2028 while extending the terms of barangay and SK officials from four years to five years.

Macalintal then petitioned the Supreme Court to have them issue a temporary retraining order to allow the election to continue. A day later, the Supreme Court directed the respondents (the Office of the President, the Senate, the House of Representatives, and the Commission on Elections) to comment on Macalintal's petition. Later that week, the COMELEC chairman George Garcia said that if the Supreme Court will grant a restraining order, they would have postponed the elections by 30 days as preparations ceased once the law was signed.

=== Voter registration ===
The commission scheduled voter registration for this election from August 1 to 10, 2025. COMELEC announced that 2.7 million people registered for the election, with 65% of those registering coming from the youth.

The commission again opened voter registration starting on October 20, 2025, and continued until May 18, 2026.

== Statistics ==
From the 42,001 barangays recorded in 2023, there are now 42,010 barangays in the Philippines as of March 31, 2026, according to the Philippine Statistics Authority.

The following barangays will hold barangay and Sangguniang Kabataan elections for the first time:

- Barangays Sultan Corobong, Sultan Panoroganan, and Angoyao in Marawi, created after successful plebiscites on March 9, 2024.
  - Barangay Sultan Corobong was created from Barangay Dulay Proper
  - Barangay Sultan Panoroganan was created from Barangay Kilala
  - Barangay Angoyao was created from Barangay Patan
- Barangay Juan-Loreto Tamayo in Tupi, South Cotabato, created after a successful plebiscite on July 13, 2024.
  - Barangay Juan-Loreto Tamayo was created from parts of barangays Cebuano, Linan, and Miasong
- Barangay Guinhalinan in Barobo, Surigao del Sur, created after a successful plebiscite on August 10, 2024.
- Barangays 176-A, 176-B, 176-C, 176-D, 176-E, and 176-F in Caloocan, created after a successful plebiscite on August 31, 2024.
  - Barangay 176 (Bagong Silang), the most populous barangay in the country, was divided into six new barangays.

Moreover, boundaries of barangays in Las Piñas were redrawn after a successful plebiscite on June 29, 2024. Boundaries of coastal barangays in Parañaque were redrawn after a successful plebiscite on June 24, 2026.

Barangay Sawata in San Isidro, Davao del Norte, was renamed "Barangay Poblacion" following a plebiscite on April 11, 2026, while a parallel plebiscite renamed San Isidro to "Sawata".

As there are 42,010 barangays on election day, the following positions shall be disputed:

- All 42,010 barangay captains (1 in each barangay)
- 294,070 barangay councilors (kagawad; 7 in each barangay)
- All 42,010 Sangguniang Kabataan (SK) chairperson (1 in each barangay, also the 8th barangay councilor)
- All 294,070 SK councilors (7 in each barangay)
