= Philippine Councilors League =

Organization of city and municipal legislators in the Philippines

- Liga ng mga Konsehal ng Pilipinas
- Established: September 1990; 35 years ago
- Headquarters: 10th Floor, DILG-NAPOLCOM Center, EDSA corner Quezon Avenue, Quezon City
- Members: 17,163 as of March 2020
- National President: Handy Lao
- National Chairperson: Raul Corro
- Website: www.philippinecouncilorsleague.org

The Philippine Councilors League (PCL; Filipino: Liga ng mga Konsehal ng Pilipinas) is an official organization in the Philippines composed of all elected, appointed, and ex officio members of legislative councils in the cities and municipalities of the country.

The presidents of the PCL's provincial chapters are ex officio members of their province's legislature (Sangguniang Panlalawigan).

== Overview ==
Each city in the Philippines has a legislature known as a Sangguniang Panlungsod (city council) composed of 10 to 36 regular members and at least 2 ex officio members. (Note: One from the Liga ng mga Barangay and one from the Sangguniang Kabataan. Some councils also have a reserved seat for the indigenous peoples community.) Each municipality in the Philippines also has its respective legislature known as a Sangguniang Bayan (municipal council) composed of 8 regular members (Note: Except for Pateros which has 12 regular council members.) and at least 2 ex officio members. All elected, appointed, and ex officio members of those legislative councils automatically become members of the PCL.

The PCL members of a province—i.e. the councilors of a province's component cities and municipalities—elect a president of their provincial chapter who will then serve as an ex officio member of their Sangguniang Panlalawigan (provincial legislature).

Councilors serve three-year terms, renewable twice consecutively. The most recent election was held in 2025, and the next is scheduled for 2028.

== History ==
The idea to form a nationwide organization of councilors emerged in 1989. In July that year, the Metro Manila Councilors League (MMPCL) was formed. They then encouraged councilors outside Metro Manila to form regional and provincial federations. In September 1990, the existing organizations of councilors held the first Philippine Councilors League (PCL) congress in Manila. Guillermo C. Altuna of Quezon City was elected as the first national chairman, while Ponciano D. Subido of Manila was elected the first national president. That same month, the PCL was accredited by the Department of Local Government and registered with the Securities and Exchange Commission. In 1991, the Local Government Code established that each provincial legislature would allocate one seat for the president of the province's PCL chapter.

On February 27, 2020, the outgoing national board declared a failure of elections after the automated election system contracted by the organization to conduct the election of its national officers failed. Competing for the top position were councilors Danilo Dayanghirang from Davao City, who was handpicked by President Rodrigo Duterte, and Jesciel Richard Salceda from Polangui, Albay.

== Leadership ==
=== National Chairpersons ===
Image	National Chairperson (Lifespan)	Constituency Region	Party	Term of office		Ref.
	Guillermo C. Altuna (died 1996)	Quezon City; NCR		Sep. 1990		
Missing data for the terms 1993-1996, 1996-1999, and 1999-2002.
	Elmer O. Datuin	Baguio City; CAR		2002	June 30, 2007; Term-limited	
	Michael B. Fernandez (Interim) (born 1973)	Dagupan City; Region I	Lakas	June 30, 2007	March 30, 2008	
	Alan D. Zulueta	Tagum City, Davao del Norte; Region XI	Liberal	March 30, 2008	March 2014	
	Alma Moreno (born 1959)	Parañaque City; NCR	Liberal	March 2014	June 30, 2016; Term-limited	
	Elmer O. Datuin (Interim)	Baguio City; CAR	UNA	June 30, 2016	March 2017	
	Danilo C. Dayanghirang	Davao City; Region XI	PDP; Local: Hugpong	March 2017	June 30, 2022; Lost seat	
	Vandolph Quizon (Interim) (born 1984)	Parañaque City; NCR	PDP	June 30, 2022	March 9, 2023	
	Raul C. Corro	Muntinlupa City; NCR	1Munti	March 9, 2023	Present	

=== National Presidents ===
Image	National President (Lifespan)	Constituency (Region)	Party	Term of office		Ref.
	Ponciano D. Subido (1937/1938-2012)	City of Manila; NCR		Sep. 1990		
Missing data for the terms 1992-1995 and 1995-1998.
	Michael L. Rama (born 1954)	Cebu City, Cebu; 2nd (South) District; Region VII	PROMDI; Local: BOPK	1998	June 30, 2001; Elected Vice Mayor	
	Salvador D. Pangilinan	Makati City; NCR		As of Feb. 2002		
Missing data for the terms 2002-2005 and 2005-2008.
	Carlo P. Fortuna	Mandaue City, Cebu; Region VII	Lakas		June 30, 2007; Elected vice mayor	
	Arecio R. Rendor, Jr. (Interim)	Oas, Albay; Region V		June 30, 2007	March 30, 2008	
	Ronald P. Carcillar	Poro, Cebu; Region VII		March 30, 2008	March 2011	
	Alma Moreno (born 1959)	Parañaque City; NCR	Lakas	March 2011	March 2014	
	Maybelyn Rose D. Fernandez (born 1982)	Dagupan City; Region I	Liberal	March 2014	March 2017	
	Luis "Chavit" C. Singson (born 1941)	Narvacan, Ilocos Sur; Region I	Nacionalista	March 2017	June 30, 2019; Elected Mayor	
	Handy T. Lao (born 1980)	Laoag City, Ilocos Norte; Region I	Nacionalista; Local: Team Marcos	June 23, 2022 (Interim)	March 9, 2023	
	Handy T. Lao (born 1980)	Laoag City, Ilocos Norte; Region I	Nacionalista; Local: Team Marcos	March 9, 2023	June 30, 2025; Lost seat	
	Samuel Huertas (born 1941)	Iligan City, Lanao del Norte; Region X	Nacionalista	2025	present	
