= Philippine legal codes =

Laws that are enacted in the Philippines

Codification of laws is a common practice in the Philippines. Many general areas of substantive law, such as criminal law, civil law and labor law are governed by codes of law.

== Tradition ==
Codification is predominant in countries that adhere to the legal system of civil law. Spain, a civil law country, introduced the practice of codification in the Philippines, which it had colonized beginning in the late 16th century. Among the codes that Spain enforced in the Philippines were the Spanish Civil Code and the Penal Code.

The practice of codification was retained during the American colonial period, even though the United States was a common law jurisdiction. At the time, many common law principles found their way into the legal system by way of legislation and by judicial pronouncements. Judicial precedents of the Philippine Supreme Court were accepted as binding, a practice more attuned to common law jurisdictions. Eventually, the Philippine legal system emerged in such a way that while the practice of codification remained popular, the courts were not barred from invoking principles developed under the common law, or from employing methods of statutory construction in order to arrive at an interpretation of the codal provisions that would be binding in itself in Philippine law. (Note: See Sections 8 and 9 of the Civil Code of the Philippines.)

Beginning in the American period, there was an effort to revise the Spanish codes that had remained in force even after the end of Spanish rule. A new Revised Penal Code was enacted in 1930, while a new Civil Code took effect in 1950.

== Republic Acts ==
Since the formation of local legislative bodies in the Philippines, Philippine legal codes have been enacted by the legislature, in the exercise of its powers of legislation. Since 1946, the laws passed by the Congress, including legal codes, have been titled Republic Acts. (Note: Also known as Batas Pambansa during the Marcos-era Batasang Pambansa (English: National Legislature))

While Philippine legal codes are, strictly speaking, also Republic Acts, they may be differentiated in that the former represents a more comprehensive effort in embodying all aspects of a general area of law into just one legislative act. In contrast, Republic Acts are generally less expansive and more specific in scope. Thus, while the Civil Code seeks to govern all aspects of private law in the Philippines, a Republic Act such as Republic Act No. 9048 would concern itself with a more limited field, as in that case, the correction of entries in the civil registry.

Still, the amendment of Philippine legal codes is accomplished through the passage of Republic Acts. Republic Acts have also been utilized to enact legislation on areas where the legal codes have proven insufficient. For example, while the possession of narcotics had been penalized under the 1930s Revised Penal Code, the wider attention drawn to illegal drugs in the 1960s and the 1970s led to new legislation increasing the penalties for possession and trafficking of narcotics. Instead of enacting amendments to the Revised Penal Code, Congress chose instead to enact a special law, the Dangerous Drugs Act of 1972.

== List ==
Laws	Common name	Date enacted	Notes
Executive Order No. 292	Administrative Code of 1987	25 Jul 1987	The Administrative Code "incorporates in a unified document the major structural, functional and procedural principles and rules of governance." Its primary function is to prescribe the standards, guidelines and practices within the executive branch of government. It is the Administrative Code which establishes the various Cabinet departments and offices falling within the executive branch of government, and under the direct control and supervision of the President. The Code also prescribes the administrative procedure undertaken in proceedings before the offices under the executive department. Originally coming into effect in 1917, the code was revised and amended repeatedly, with the present code being enacted in 1987.
Presidential Decree No. 603	Child and Youth Welfare Code	10 Dec 1974	
Republic Act No. 386	Civil Code	18 Jun 1949	The Civil Code governs private law in the Philippines, including obligations and contracts, succession, torts and damages, property. It was enacted in 1950. Book I of the Civil Code, which governed marriage and family law, was supplanted by the Family Code in 1987.
Republic Act No. 6657	Comprehensive Agrarian Reform Code	10 Jun 1988	
Presidential Decree No. 961	Coconut Industry Code	11 Jun 1978	
Spanish Code of Commerce, Extended by Royal Decree	Code of Commerce	10 Dec 1888	
Republic Act No. 6713	Code of Conduct and Ethical Standards for Public Officials and Employees	20 Feb 1989	An act establishing a code of conduct and ethical standards for public officials and employees, to uphold the time-honored principle of public office being a public trust, granting incentives and rewards for exemplary service, enumerating prohibited acts and transactions and providing penalties for violations thereof and for other purposes.
Republic Act No. 9520	Cooperative Code	17 Feb 2009	
Republic Act No. 11232	Revised Corporation Code of the Philippines	20 Feb 2019	The Revised Corporation Code provides for the rules and regulations in the establishment and operation of stock and non-stock corporations in the Philippines. It superseded the Batas Pambansa Blg. 68.
Executive Order No. 209	Family Code	6 Jul 1987	Superseded Book I of the Civil Code, which governed marriage and family law.
Republic Act No. 9514	Revised Fire Code of the Philippines of 2008	19 Dec 2008	
Republic Act No. 8550	The Philippine Fisheries Code of 1998	25 Feb 1998	
Republic Act No. 8491	Flag and Heraldic Code	12 Feb 1998	
Republic Act No. 10607	Insurance Code	15 Aug 2013	
Republic Act No. 8293	Intellectual Property Code	6 Jun 1997	The Intellectual Property Code governs the protection of intellectual property in the Philippines. Initially, the legal protection of intellectual property was contained in a few provisions in the Civil Code. A growing concern for intellectual property protection led to the passage of more comprehensive special laws until the final codification of intellectual property law through the Code, enacted in 1997.
Presidential Decree No. 442	Labor Code	1 May 1974	The Labor Code, enacted in 1974, governs employment practices and labor relations in the Philippines.
Republic Act No. 4136	Land Transportation and Traffic Code	20 Jun 1964	
Republic Act No. 7160	Local Government Code	10 Oct 1991	The Local Government Code, enacted in 1991, establishes the system and powers of the local government in the Philippines: provinces, cities, municipalities and barangays. The Local Government Code empowers local governments to enact tax measures, including real property taxes, and assures the local governments a share in the national internal revenue through the Internal Revenue Allotment.
Republic Act No. 9296	Meat Inspection Code	12 May 2004	
Presidential Decree No. 1083	Muslim Code of Personal Laws	4 Feb 1977	
Presidential Decree No. 1096	National Building Code	19 Feb 1977	
Executive Order No. 51	National Code of Marketing of Breast-milk Substitutes and Supplements	20 Oct 1986	
Batas Pambansa Blg. 881	Omnibus Election Code	3 Dec 1985	
Executive Order No. 226	Omnibus Investment Code of 1987	16 Jul 1987	
Presidential Decree No. 1152	Philippine Environment Code	6 Jun 1977	
Republic Act No. 9829	Pre-Need Code of the Philippines	27 Jul 2009	
Presidential Decree No. 705	Revised Forestry Code	18 May 1975	
Act No. 3815	Revised Penal Code	8 Dec 1930	The Revised Penal Code contains the general penal laws of the Philippines and is one of the major sources of criminal laws in the Philippines. It was enacted in 1930 and has undergone several amendments.
Presidential Decree No. 856	Sanitation Code	23 Dec 1975	
Republic Act No. 8799	Securities Regulation Code	19 Jul 2000	The regulation of securities and practices in the stock market governed by the 2000 Securities Regulation Code
Presidential Decree No. 1445	State Auditing Code	11 Jun 1978	
Republic Act No. 8424	Tax Code/National Internal Revenue Code	11 Dec 1997	The National Internal Revenue Code is the law establishing the system of national taxation in the Philippines. The most recent extensive revision of the Code occurred in 1997, although the Code was amended in 2005 to expand the coverage and rates of value-added tax. The taxes imposed by the Code include a graduated income tax on all income earned by natural and juridical persons within the Philippines, a capital gains tax, excise tax on certain products, a Donor's Tax, an estate tax, and a value-added tax on the sale of most goods and services in the Philippines. Real property taxes are considered as local, rather than national taxes, and are covered instead under the Local Government Code. Tariffs and duties are covered under the Tariff and Customs Code.
Republic Act No. 1937	Tariff and Customs Code	22 Jun 1957	
Presidential Decree No. 1067	Water Code	31 Dec 1976	

== See also ==
- List of Philippine legal terms
