= 2018 Palarong Pambansa =

Multi-sports competition

61st Palarong Pambansa
- Host city: Vigan, Ilocos Sur
- Country: Philippines
- Teams: 17 regional athletic associations
- Athletes: 15,000+ athletes
- Opening: 15 April
- Closing: 21 April
- Opened by: Philippine President Rodrigo Duterte
- Torch lighter: Luis Gabriel Moreno
- Main venue: Quirino Stadium

The 2018 Palarong Pambansa was the 61st edition of the Palarong Pambansa multi-sports event and was held in Vigan, Ilocos Sur from April 15 to 21, 2018. Student athletes from 17 athletic associations representing the 17 regions of the Philippines competed in different sporting events and disciplines.

== Bidding ==
The cities of Baguio and Vigan made a bid to host the 61st Palarong Pambansa. In 2017, Vigan was selected host of the Games. In January 2018, the Department of Education and the provincial government of Ilocos Sur signed a memorandum of agreement regarding the hosting of the games to be held primarily in Vigan.

2018 Palarong Pambansa bids
City/Municipality	Province/Region
Vigan	Ilocos Sur/R-1
Baguio City	Benguet/Cordillera Region

Winning bid

== The Games ==
The opening ceremony of the 2018 Palarong Pambansa was held at the Quirino Stadium in Bantay, Ilocos Sur on April 15, 2018. Philippine President Rodrigo Duterte was the guest speaker of the event for the second consecutive year. Duterte stated that the event is a breeding ground for future sports icons and nation-builders, "whose values and principles are founded on perseverance, discipline, teamwork, integrity, and love of country".

Sports personalities including chess grandmaster Eugene Torre, cue artist Efren "Bata" Reyes, bowler Paeng Nepomuceno, swimmer Eric Buhain, long jumper Elma Muros, 1996 Summer Olympics silver medalist Mansueto Velasco, 2014 Youth Olympic Games gold medalist Luis Gabriel Moreno and 2016 Summer Olympics silver medalist Hidilyn Diaz led the carrying of the giant Philippine flag. Moreno then lit the friendship cauldron using an arrow shot, symbolizing the commencement of the games.

Lydia de Vega-Mercado, considered as Asia's fastest woman in the 1980s, was honored as the Palarong Pambansa Lifetime Achievement Awardee during the opening rites. Her daughter, Stephanie represented her in the event.

On the second day of the Games on 16 April 2018, barefoot runner Lheslie de Lima from Camarines Sur won the first gold medal of the event in the 3,000 meter run (secondary girls category). She dedicated the win to her distant relative Senator Leila de Lima, who is currently in prison.

At the final day of the Games on April 21, 2018, the National Capital Region capped off their campaign with their 14th straight-overall championship, winning 100 gold, 70 silver and 50 bronze medals. Calabarzon and Western Visayas ended up with 1st and 2nd runner-up finishes, respectively.

=== Sports ===
==== Regular Sports ====
These are the regular sports disciplines that were played in the games.

- Archery
- Arnis
- Aquatics
- Athletics
- Badminton
- Baseball
- Basketball
- Boxing
- Chess
- Football
- Futsal
- Gymnastics
- Sepak takraw (Boys)
- Softball
- Table tennis
- Taekwondo
- Tennis
- Volleyball

==== Demonstration sports ====
These are the seven demonstration sports played at this year's Palarong Pambansa.

- Aerobic Gymnastics
- Billiards
- Dancesport
- Pencak Silat
- Sepak takraw (Girls)
- Wrestling
- Wushu

==== Special Para Games ====
These are the four para sports that were contested at this year's Palarong Pambansa.

- Swimming
- Bocce
- Goalball
- Athletics

=== Participating regions ===
A total of 17 athletic associations coming from 17 regions of the country participated in the athletic meet. The provinces of Negros Occidental and Negros Oriental which competed under the Negros Island Region in the previous two editions of the games (2016 Palarong Pambansa and 2017 Palarong Pambansa) will now compete and merge with their previous original regions, Western Visayas and Central Visayas respectively, after the Negros Island Region which was created in 2015 was dissolved by President Rodrigo Duterte.

Host Region

Regions
Code	Name	Colors
ARMMAA	Autonomous Region in Muslim Mindanao	
CARAA	Cordillera Administrative Region	
NCRAA	National Capital Region	
IRAA	Region I or Ilocos Region	
CAVRAA	Region II or Cagayan Valley	
CLRAA	Region III or Central Luzon	
STCAA	Region IV-A or Southern Tagalog - Calabarzon	
MRAA (MimaropaA)	Region IV-B or Southern Tagalog - Mimaropa	
BRAA	Region V or Bicol Region	
WVRAA	Region VI or Western Visayas	
CVRAA	Region VII Central Visayas	
EVRAA	Region VIII or Eastern Visayas	
ZPRAA	Region IX or Zamboanga Peninsula	
NMRAA	Region X or Northern Mindanao	
DAVRAA	Region XI or Davao Region	
SRAA	Region XII or Soccsksargen	
CaragaRAA	Region XIII or Caraga	

== Playing Venues ==
At least 34 different locations in various towns across Ilocos Sur and its capital city Vigan were selected as the playing venues for the 26 sports disciplines of the games.

Regular Events
Event	Venue	Municipality
Archery	San Ildefonso Elementary School	San Ildefonso
Arnis	San Vicente Municipal Gym	San Vicente
Aquatics	Quirino Stadium Poolside	Bantay
Athletics	Quirino Stadium (track and jumping events); UNP Athletic Grounds (throwing events)	Bantay; Vigan
Badminton	Vigan City Convention Center	Vigan
Baseball	Barangay Tamag Motorpool Area	Vigan
Basketball	San Ildefonso Municipal Covered Court (Elementary); San Juan Municipal Gym (Secondary Boys); Caoayan Municipal Gym (Secondary Girls); Quirino Stadium Open Court (3x3)	San Ildefonso; San Juan; Caoayan; Bantay
Boxing	Plaza Burgos	Vigan
Chess	Baluarte Function Hall - A	Vigan
Football	Immaculate Conception Minor Seminary (Elementary); Saint Paul College of Ilocos Sur Football Field (Elementary); Quirino Stadium (Secondary); Pagsanaan Football Field (Secondary)	Vigan; San Vicente; Bantay; Magsingal
Futsal	Barangay Pasungol Covered Court; Santa Municipal Gym	Santa
Gymnastics	Santa Maria Municipal Gym	Santa Maria
Sepak takraw	Immaculate Conception School of Theology; Quirino Stadium Open Courts	Vigan; Bantay
Softball	Cirilo Lao Construction Compound	Bantay
Table tennis	Philippine Science High School Ilocos Region Campus Gym	San Ildefonso
Taekwondo	Santo Domingo Municipal Gym	Santo Domingo
Tennis	Quirino Stadium Open Court (Elementary Boys); Vigan City Tennis Club (Elementary Girls); San Ildefonso Tennis Court (Secondary Boys); Santo Domingo Tennis Court (Secondary Boys); Santa Catalina Tennis Court (Secondary Girls)	Bantay; Vigan; San Ildefonso; Santo Domingo; Santa Catalina
Volleyball	Barangay Ayusan Norte Covered Court (Elementary Boys); Barangay Beddeng Laud Covered Court (Elementary Girls); Quirino Stadium Open Court (Secondary Boys); Santa Catalina Municipal Gym (Secondary Boys); Barangay Poblacion Gym (Secondary Girls)	Vigan; Vigan; Bantay; Santa Catalina; Santo Domingo

Demonstration Sports
Event	Venue	Municipality
* Aerobic Gymnastics	NSCC Function Hall	Caoayan
* Billiards	Lyric Cinema Billiards Center	Vigan
Dancesport	NSCC Function Hall	Caoayan
Pencak Silat	Barangay Tamag Covered Court	Vigan
Wrestling	Barangay 9 Titong Singson Multi-purpose Covered Court	Vigan
Wushu	Bantay West Central Elementary School	Bantay

Special Para Events
Event	Venue	Municipality
Bocce	San Vicente Plaza	San Vicente
Goalball	Ilocos Sur Badminton Club	Bantay

== Billeting Areas ==
=== Athletic Delegations ===
Several public and private elementary, secondary and tertiary schools, colleges and universities situated at the provincial capital Vigan and nearby towns were selected as the billeting areas for delegates and officials of the games.

Host Region

Billeting Areas
Athletic Association Code	Region	Billeting Area	Location
ARMMAA	Autonomous Region in Muslim Mindanao	San Vicente IS; Bayubay ES; Pangada ES	San Vicente; San Vicente; Sta. Catalina
CARAA	Cordillera Administrative Region	Sto. Domingo NCS; Sto. Domingo SCS; Benito Soliven Academy	Sto. Domingo
NCRAA	National Capital Region	Sinait NHS; Salindeg ES (buffer holding area)	Sinait; Vigan
IRAA	Region I - Ilocos Region	San Sebastian ES; San Sebastian NHS; Pudoc ES	San Vicente
CAVRAA	Region II - Cagayan Valley	Cabugao SCS; Cabugao NCS; Cabugao Institute; Balaleng ES (buffer holding area)	Cabugao; Cabugao; Cabugao; Bantay
CLRAA	Region III - Central Luzon	Ilocos Sur NHS	Vigan
STCAA	Region IV-A - Southern Tagalog - Calabarzon	Vigan NHS East; Nagsangalan ES; Rugsuanan ES	Vigan
MRAA (MimaropaA)	Region IV-B - Southern Tagalog - Mimaropa	Sta. Maria NHS; Capangpangan ES (buffer holding area)	Santa Maria; Vigan
BRAA	Region V - Bicol Region	Basug Commercial School; Mabilbila Institute; Santa CS	Santa
WVRAA	Region VI - Western Visayas	Bulag ES; Bantay NHS; Paing ES; Ora East ES (buffer holding area); Ora West ES (buffer holding area)	Bantay
CVRAA	Region VII - Central Visayas	Sta. Catalina CS; Cabittaogan NHS; Cabittaogan ES	Santa Catalina
EVRAA	Region VIII - Eastern Visayas	University of Northern Philippines	Vigan
ZPRAA	Region IX - Zamboanga Peninsula	Vigan CS; Burgos Memorial School	Vigan
NMRAA	Region X - Northern Mindanao	Narvacan NHS	Narvacan
DAVRAA	Region XI - Davao Region	Ilocos Sur NHS; Ayusan-Paoa ES (buffer holding area)	Vigan
SRAA	Region XII - Soccsksargen	University of Northern Philippines	Vigan
Caraga	Region XIII - Caraga	Naglaoa-an NHS; Naglaoa-an ES; Sagsagat ES	Santo Domingo; Santo Domingo; San Ildefonso

CS - central school, NCS - north central school, SCS - south central school, ES - elementary school, IS - integrated school, NHS - national high school.

=== Technical Officials and Referees ===
Billeting Areas
Sport	Billeting Area	Location
Aero Gymnastics	Cal-Laguip Elementary School	Caoayan
Archery	San Ildefonso Central School	San Ildefonso
Athletics	Caoayan Central School	Caoayan
Badminton	Burgos Memorial School East	Vigan
Baseball	Tamag Elementary School	Vigan
Basketball	Silang Elementary School	Bantay
Billiards	Burgos Memorial School East	Vigan
Boxing	Bantay West Central Elementary School	Bantay
Chess	Caoayan National High School	Caoayan
Dancesport	Cal-Laguip Elementary School	Caoayan
Football	Guimod Elementary School	Bantay
Futsal	Sacuyya Community School	Santa
Gymnastics	Paras-Parada Elementary School	Santo Domingo
Pencak Silat	Caoayan Central School	Caoayan
Sepak Takraw	Baggoc P. Quitiquit Elementary School	Caoayan
Softball	Busiing Elementary School	San Ildefonso
Table Tennis	San Ildefonso Central School	San Ildefonso
Taekwondo	Sta. Maria Central School	Santa Maria
Tennis	Caoayan National High School	Caoayan
Volleyball	Bantay West Central Elementary School	Bantay
Wrestling	San Julian Elementary School	Vigan
Wushu	Bantay West Central Elementary School	Bantay

== Official Medal Tally ==
=== Regular Games ===
As of 21 April 2018, 13:01:57 (UTC +08) (Final)

* Host nation (Host region)

Rank	Region	Gold	Silver	Bronze	Total
1	National Capital Region (NCRAA)	100	70	50	220
2	Calabarzon/Southern Tagalog (STCAA)	55	50	73	178
3	Western Visayas (WVRAA)	46	45	55	146
4	Central Visayas (CVIRAA)	26	25	36	87
5	Cordillera Administrative Region (CARAA)	25	22	23	70
6	Northern Mindanao (NMRAA)	23	18	29	70
7	Soccsksargen (SRAA)	21	26	32	79
8	Central Luzon (CLRAA)	21	21	24	66
9	Davao Region (DavRAA)	12	27	28	67
10	Cagayan Valley (CaVRAA)	11	8	14	33
11	Ilocos Region (IRAA)*	10	11	31	52
12	Eastern Visayas (EVRAA)	9	10	9	28
13	Bicol Region (BRAA)	8	16	28	52
14	Caraga (CARAGARAA)	8	10	20	38
15	Mimaropa (MRAA)	5	12	12	29
16	Zamboanga Peninsula (ZPRAA)	1	9	23	33
17	Autonomous Region in Muslim Mindanao (ARMMAA)	0	0	3	3
Totals (17 entries)		381	380	490	1,251

=== Demo Sports ===
As of 21 April 2018, 13:01:57 (UTC +08) (Final)

* Host nation (Host region)

Rank	Region	Gold	Silver	Bronze	Total
1	Western Visayas (WVRAA)	8	11	5	24
2	National Capital Region (NCRAA)	7	3	1	11
3	Central Visayas (CVIRAA)	6	2	4	12
4	Calabarzon/Southern Tagalog (STCAA)	2	4	8	14
5	Zamboanga Peninsula (ZPRAA)	2	0	3	5
6	Cordillera Administrative Region (CARAA)	1	0	1	2
7	Eastern Visayas (EVRAA)	0	2	0	2
8	Soccsksargen (SRAA)	0	1	4	5
9	Central Luzon (CLRAA)	0	1	2	3
10	Ilocos Region (IRAA)*	0	1	1	2
11	Cagayan Valley (CaVRAA)	0	1	0	1
12	Bicol Region (BRAA)	0	0	2	2
12	Caraga (CARAGARAA)	0	0	2	2
12	Northern Mindanao (NMRAA)	0	0	2	2
15	Autonomous Region in Muslim Mindanao (ARMMAA)	0	0	1	1
16	Davao Region (DavRAA)	0	0	0	0
16	Mimaropa (MRAA)	0	0	0	0
Totals (17 entries)		26	26	36	88

=== Para Games ===
As of 21 April 2018, 13:01:57 (UTC +08) (Final)

* Host nation (Host region)

Rank	Region	Gold	Silver	Bronze	Total
1	Western Visayas (WVRAA)	16	18	16	50
2	Calabarzon/Southern Tagalog (STCAA)	15	15	8	38
3	Zamboanga Peninsula (ZPRAA)	12	3	2	17
4	Ilocos Region (IRAA)*	10	7	4	21
5	National Capital Region (NCRAA)	4	10	11	25
6	Davao Region (DavRAA)	4	6	4	14
7	Northern Mindanao (NMRAA)	3	1	5	9
8	Bicol Region (BRAA)	2	1	4	7
9	Caraga (CARAGARAA)	1	3	1	5
10	Central Luzon (CLRAA)	1	1	2	4
10	Soccsksargen (SRAA)	1	1	2	4
12	Mimaropa (MRAA)	1	0	0	1
13	Cagayan Valley (CaVRAA)	0	4	1	5
13	Central Visayas (CVIRAA)	0	4	1	5
15	Cordillera Administrative Region (CARAA)	0	1	0	1
16	Autonomous Region in Muslim Mindanao (ARMMAA)	0	0	0	0
16	Eastern Visayas (EVRAA)	0	0	0	0
Totals (17 entries)		70	75	61	206
