= Legislative districts of Ilocos Sur =

Legislative district of the Philippines

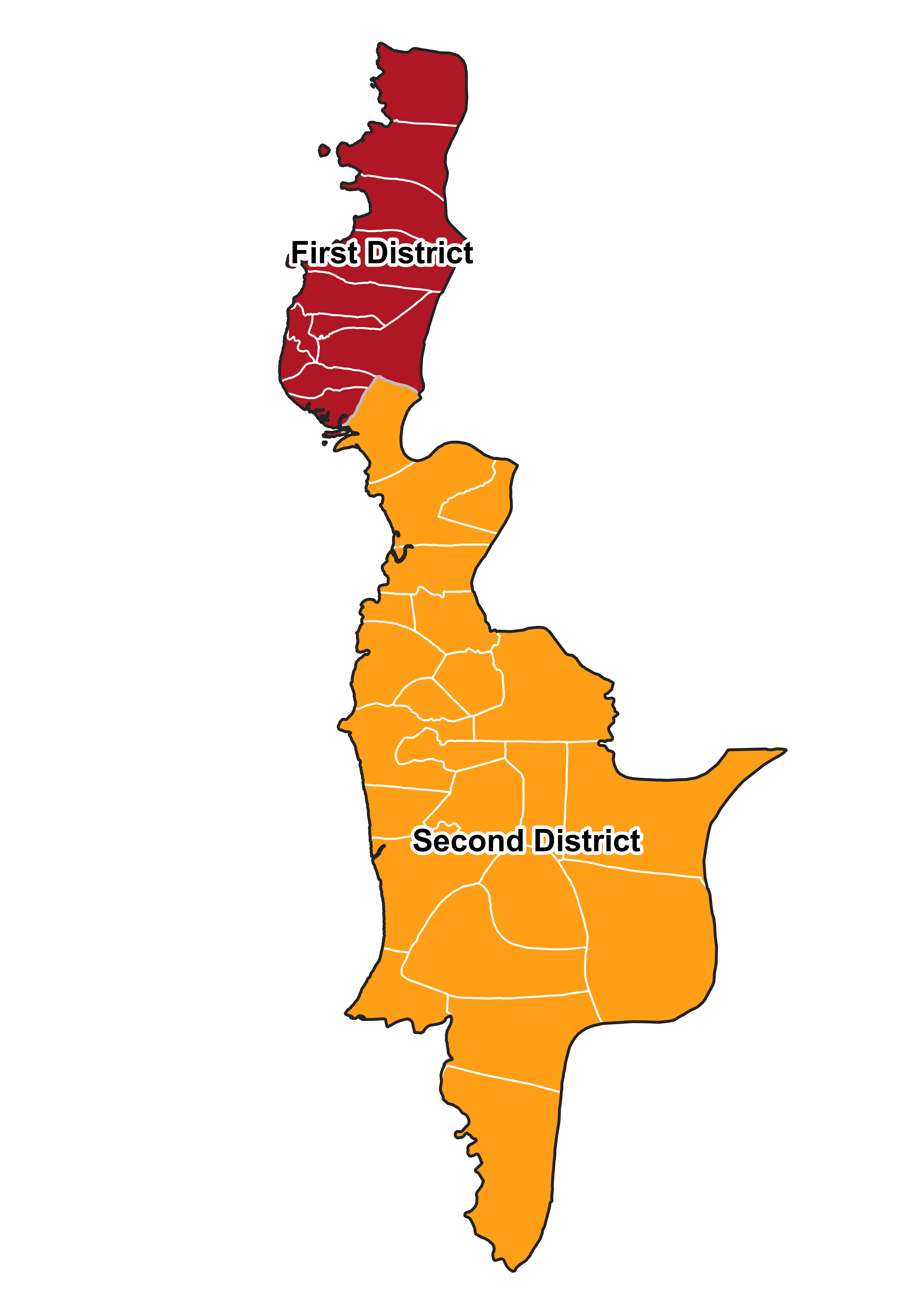

The legislative districts of Ilocos Sur are the representations of the province of Ilocos Sur in the various national legislatures of the Philippines. The province is currently represented in the lower house of the Congress of the Philippines through its first and second congressional districts.

Abra last formed part of the province's representation in 1917.

The first district of Ilocos Sur is among the original representative districts from 1907 which has never changed in territorial coverage, along with Albay's first, Ilocos Norte's first and second, and Iloilo's first districts.

== History ==
Ilocos Sur, which at the time included the sub-province of Abra, was initially divided in 1907 into three representative districts. Abra was last represented as part of the province's now-defunct third district in 1917, after its re-establishment as a regular province on March 10, 1917, by virtue of Act No. 2683 warranted its separate representation, thereby reducing Ilocos Sur to two districts.

When the Philippine Commission detached Tagudin from Ilocos Sur and made it the capital of the sub-province of Amburayan in Mountain Province on May 15, 1907, by virtue of Act No. 1646, the town's residents were still allowed to vote as part of the Ilocos Sur's second district. This arrangement was terminated on August 10, 1916, under Act No. 2657 (the Administrative Code of the Philippine Islands), which removed the town from the second district.

The enactment of Act No. 2877 in 1920 reorganized northwestern Luzon, by abolishing the sub-province of Amburayan in the undivided Mountain Province and annexing several of its municipal entities—Alilem, Sigay, Sugpon, Suyo and its capital Tagudin—to Ilocos Sur. The Lepanto sub-province townships of Angaki, Concepcion, San Emilio and its capital Cervantes were also placed under the jurisdiction of Ilocos Sur. However residents of these areas remained represented by the Mountain Province's appointed assembly members until they were finally extended the right to vote in assembly district elections in 1935, after the passage of Act No. 4203 placed them in the second district of Ilocos Sur.

Ilocos Sur was represented in the Interim Batasang Pambansa as part of Region I from 1978 to 1984, and elected two representatives to the Regular Batasang Pambansa in 1984. The province retained its two congressional districts under the new Constitution which was proclaimed on February 11, 1987, and elected members to the restored House of Representatives starting that same year.

== Current districts and representatives ==
Ilocos Sur's current congressional delegation is composed of two members.

NPC (2)

Legislative districts and representatives of Ilocos Sur
District	Current Representative		Party	Constituent LGUs	Population (2020)	Area	Map
District	Image	Name	Party	Constituent LGUs	Population (2020)	Area	Map
1st		Ronald V. Singson (since 2022); Vigan	NPC	List: Bantay; Cabugao; Caoayan; Magsingal; San Ildefonso; San Juan; San Vicente; Santa Catalina; Santo Domingo; Sinait; Vigan	298,333	518.73 km²	
2nd		Kristine G. Singson-Meehan (since 2019); Candon	NPC	List: Alilem; Banayoyo; Burgos; Candon; Cervantes; Galimuyod; Gregorio del Pilar; Lidlidda; Nagbukel; Narvacan; Quirino; Salcedo; San Emilio; San Esteban; Santa; Santa Cruz; Santa Lucia; Santa Maria; Santiago; Sigay; Sugpon; Suyo; Tagudin	407,676	2,077.27 km²	

== Defunct districts ==
=== 3rd District ===
- Municipalities: Bangued, Bucay, Dolores, La Paz, Pidigan, Pilar, San Quintin, Santa, Tayum

Period	Representative
1st Philippine Legislature; 1907–1909	Juan Villamor
2nd Philippine Legislature; 1909–1912	Juan Villamor
3rd Philippine Legislature; 1912–1916	Julio Borbon
4th Philippine Legislature; 1916–1917	Eustaquio Purungganan

=== At-Large (defunct) ===
==== 1943–1944 ====
Period	Representatives
National Assembly; 1943–1944	Fidel Villanueva
National Assembly; 1943–1944	Alejandro Quirologico (ex officio)

==== 1984–1986 ====
Period	Representatives
Regular Batasang Pambansa; 1984–1986	Salacnib F. Baterina
Regular Batasang Pambansa; 1984–1986	Eric D. Singson

== See also ==
- Legislative district of Abra
- Legislative district of Mountain Province
