= Magsingal =

Municipality in Ilocos Sur, Philippines

- Municipality
- Municipality of Magsingal
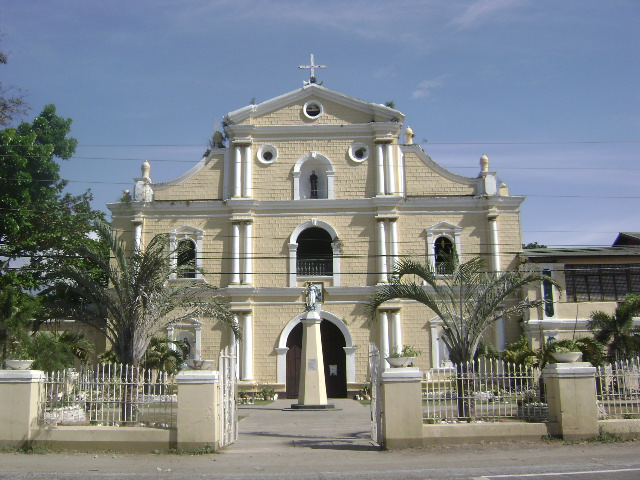
- St. William the Hermit Church

- Seal
- Motto: Agrimat Magsingal!
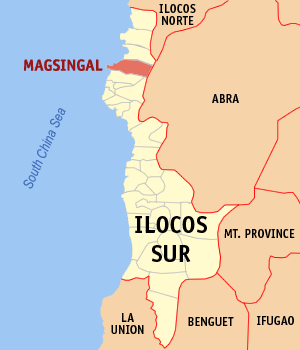
- Map of Ilocos Sur with Magsingal highlighted
- Interactive map of Magsingal
- Location within the Philippines
- Coordinates: 17°41′06″N 120°25′28″E
- Country: Philippines
- Region: Ilocos Region
- Province: Ilocos Sur
- District: 1st district
- Barangays: 30 (see Barangays)

Government
  - Type: Sangguniang Bayan
  - Mayor: Victoria Ina P. Favis
  - Vice Mayor: Alrico A.Favis
  - Representative: Ronald Singson
  - Municipal Council: Members: Erwin B. Isaguirre; Aquiles U. Udarbe Jr.; Agustin I. Pichay; Carlos G. Marañon; John Felix P. Jurado; Randy R. Ugale; Lorenzo F. Unciano; Cornelio T. Fuller
  - Electorate: 21,030 voters (2025)

Area
  - Total: 84.98 km^{2} (32.81 sq mi)
- Elevation: 22 m (72 ft)
- Highest elevation: 311 m (1,020 ft)
- Lowest elevation: 0 m (0 ft)

Population (2024 census)
  - Total: 31,970
  - Density: 376.2/km^{2} (974.4/sq mi)
  - Households: 7,840

Economy
  - Income class: 1st municipal income class
  - Poverty incidence: 7.27% (2023)
  - Revenue: ₱ 1,506 million (2024)
  - Assets: ₱ 4,353 million (2024)
  - Expenditure: ₱ 306.4 million (2024)
  - Liabilities: ₱ 178 million (2024)

Service provider
  - Electricity: Ilocos Sur Electric Cooperative (ISECO)
- Time zone: UTC+8 (PST)
- ZIP code: 2730
- PSGC: 0102912000
- IDD : area code: +63 (0)77
- Native languages: Ilocano; Tagalog
- Website: www.magsingal.gov.ph

Magsingal, officially the Municipality of Magsingal (Ilocano: Ili ti Magsingal; Tagalog: Bayan ng Magsingal) is a 1st class municipality in the province of Ilocos Sur, Philippines. According to the 2024 census, it has a population of 31,970 people.

== Etymology ==
The name of the municipality came from the term "Mayisingal," an Ilocano term which means "to be moved." It was applied when the belltower was moved from a previous location to its current site.

Captain Juan de Salcedo had a hand in founding the municipality; but before he reached the current site of the poblacion, he came to a village called Malongon, about half a kilometer to the south. The leader of the village refused Salcedo's request to establish a municipality there. He instead suggested that Salcedo establish the town a half kilometer north of the village, and the belltower be moved to that site, hence the origin of the town's name.

== History ==
Itnegs were the original inhabitants of the place when Salcedo arrived. He attempted to convert the people to Christianity, but not all accepted the new faith. Those who refused conversion fled the town and settled to the east of Bantay Bul-lagaw (Bul-lagaw Mountain).

== Geography ==
The Municipality of Magsingal is bordered by San Juan to the north, Santo Domingo and Bantay to the south, and Abra to the east.

Magsingal is situated 14.12 kilometres (8.77 mi) from the provincial capital Vigan, and 415.05 kilometres (257.90 mi) from the country's capital city of Manila.

=== Barangays ===
Magsingal is politically subdivided into 30 barangays. Each barangay consists of puroks and some have sitios.

- Alangan
- Bacar
- Barbarit
- Bungro
- Cabaroan
- Cadanglaan
- Caraisan
- Dacutan
- Labut
- Maas-asin
- Macatcatud
- Manzante
- Maratudo
- Miramar
- Namalpalan
- Napo
- Pagsanaan Norte
- Pagsanaan Sur
- Panay Norte
- Panay Sur
- Patong
- Puro (Puro Pinget)
- San Basilio (Poblacion)
- San Clemente (Poblacion)
- San Julian (Poblacion)
- San Lucas (Poblacion)
- San Ramon (Poblacion)
- San Vicente (Poblacion)
- Santa Monica
- Sarsaracat

=== Climate ===
Climate data for Magsingal, Ilocos Sur
Month	Jan	Feb	Mar	Apr	May	Jun	Jul	Aug	Sep	Oct	Nov	Dec	Year
Mean daily maximum °C (°F)	30 (86)	31 (88)	33 (91)	34 (93)	33 (91)	31 (88)	30 (86)	30 (86)	30 (86)	31 (88)	30 (86)	29 (84)	31 (88)
Mean daily minimum °C (°F)	19 (66)	19 (66)	21 (70)	23 (73)	25 (77)	25 (77)	24 (75)	24 (75)	24 (75)	22 (72)	21 (70)	19 (66)	22 (72)
Average precipitation mm (inches)	9 (0.4)	11 (0.4)	13 (0.5)	23 (0.9)	92 (3.6)	122 (4.8)	153 (6.0)	137 (5.4)	139 (5.5)	141 (5.6)	42 (1.7)	14 (0.6)	896 (35.4)
Average rainy days	4.6	4.0	6.2	9.1	19.5	23.2	24.0	22.5	21.5	15.2	10.5	6.0	166.3
Source: Meteoblue (modeled/calculated data, not measured locally)

== Demographics ==
Population census of Magsingal

Year	Pop.	±% p.a.
1903	7,134	—
1918	10,723	+2.75%
1939	11,193	+0.20%
1948	11,697	+0.49%
1960	13,437	+1.16%
1970	16,117	+1.83%

Year	Pop.	±% p.a.
1975	17,341	+1.48%
1980	19,177	+2.03%
1990	22,271	+1.51%
1995	23,565	+1.06%
2000	25,580	+1.77%
2007	27,615	+1.06%

Year	Pop.	±% p.a.
2010	28,302	+0.90%
2015	30,792	+1.62%
2020	31,308	+0.35%
2024	31,970	+0.50%

Source: Philippine Statistics Authority

In the 2024 census, Magsingal had a population of 31,970 people. The population density was 380 inhabitants per square kilometre (980/sq mi).

== Economy ==
Poverty incidence of Magsingal (%)

Source: Philippine Statistics Authority

Magsingal's main economic source is agriculture. Farmers produce crops and agricultural goods. Fishing provides secondary source of Magsingal.

== Government ==
=== Local government ===
Magsingal, belonging to the first congressional district of the province of Ilocos Sur, is governed by a mayor designated as its local chief executive and by a municipal council as its legislative body in accordance with the Local Government Code. The mayor, vice mayor, and the councilors are elected directly by the people through an election which is being held every three years.

In 1945, the first duly elected municipal mayor via landslide vote was Hon. Policarpio Cortez Jurado.

=== Elected officials ===
Members of the Municipal Council (2025–2028)
Position	Name
Congressman	Ronald V. Singson
Mayor	Victoria Ina P. Favis
Vice-Mayor	Alrico A. Favis
Councilors	Shella Marie T. Velasco
Councilors	Sherwin J. Tiri
Councilors	Cornelio T. Fuller
Councilors	Lorenzo F. Unciano
Councilors	Tiburcio T. Tabarrejo Jr.
Councilors	John Felix P. Jurado
Councilors	Carlos G. Marañon
Councilors	Randy R. Ugale

== Education ==
The Masingal Schools District Office governs all private and public educational institutions within the municipality.

=== Primary and elementary schools ===
- Alangan Elementary School
- Arinaya Elementary School
- Barbarit Elementary School
- Caraisan Primary School
- Dacutan Primary School
- Maas-asin Elementary School
- Macatcatud Primary School
- Magsingal North Central School
- Magsingal South Central School
- Manzante Elementary School
- Maratudo Elementary School
- Miramar Elementary School
- Namalpalan Elementary School
- Napo Elementary School
- Pagsanaan Elementary School
- Panay Elementary School
- Patong Elementary School
- Puro Elementary School
- Saint William's Institute (Elementary)
- Sarsaracat Elementary School

=== Secondary schools ===
- Magsingal National High School
- Manzante National High School
- Puro National High School
- Saint William's Institute
- The Magsingal Institute
- Patong Integrated School
- Metropolitan Institute of Arts and Sciences
