= Magsingal Church =

Roman Catholic church in Ilocos Sur, Philippines

- Saint William the Hermit Parish
- Parroquia de San Guillermo Ermitaño
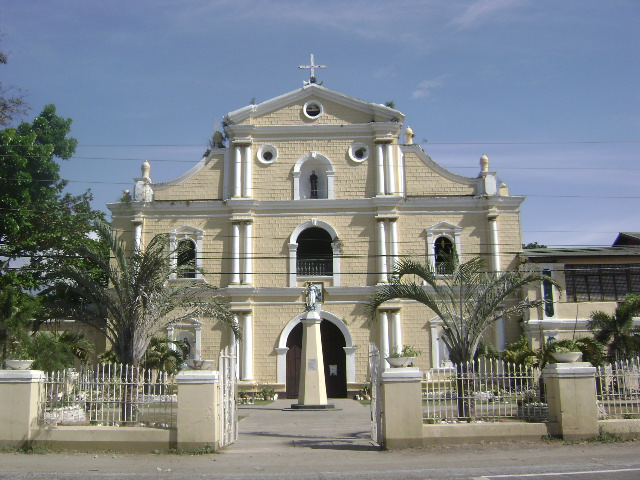
- Church facade in 2011

- Location in Luzon Location in the Philippines
- 17°41′05″N 120°25′32″E
- Location: Magsingal, Ilocos Sur
- Country: Philippines
- Denomination: Roman Catholic

History
- Founded: 1676
- Founder: Augustinian friars

Architecture
- Heritage designation: National Cultural Treasures
- Designated: 2001
- Architectural type: Church building
- Years built: 1827

Administration
- Province: Nueva Segovia
- Archdiocese: Nueva Segovia
- Deanery: Saint Mark the Evangelist

Saint William the Hermit Parish, also known as San Guillermo Ermitaño Parish or Magsiñgal Church, is a Roman Catholic church in Magsingal, Ilocos Sur, Philippines. It is under the Archdiocese of Nueva Segovia. The church is the second one established within the municipality.

The original church was built in the 18th century by the Augustinians. It features an intricate retablo, a cream and white three storey facade and a reredos.

Altar retablo in 2012

An older structure named the Parish of William the Hermit was established in 1676 and was built in 1692 within the area but was destroyed in an earthquake in 1723. Only its bell tower remains that dates back to 1732. The present church was built in 1827. The church also has a museum which displays Ilocano religious, agricultural and industrial images and items.

The church complex is recognized by the National Historical Commission of the Philippines as a National Cultural Treasure in 2001.
