= Ilocos Sur's 1st congressional district =

Legislative district of the Philippines

- Constituency for the House of Representatives of the Philippines
- Location of Ilocos Sur within the Philippines
- Province: Ilocos Sur
- Region: Ilocos Region
- Population: 298,333 (2020)
- Electorate: 205,761 (2025)
- Major settlements: 11 LGUs: Cities; Vigan; Municipalities; Bantay; Cabugao; Caoayan; Magsingal; San Ildefonso; San Juan; San Vicente; Santa Catalina; Santo Domingo; Sinait
- Area: 518.73 km^{2} (200.28 sq mi)

Current constituency
- Created: 1907
- Representative: Ronald Singson
- Political party: NPC; Bileg
- Congressional bloc: Majority

Ilocos Sur's 1st congressional district is one of the two congressional districts of the Philippines in the province of Ilocos Sur. It has been represented in the House of Representatives of the Philippines since 1916 and earlier in the Philippine Assembly from 1907 to 1916. The district consists of the provincial capital city of Vigan and adjacent municipalities of Bantay, Cabugao, Caoayan, Magsingal, San Ildefonso, San Juan, San Vicente, Santa Catalina, Santo Domingo and Sinait. It is currently represented in the 20th Congress by Ronald Singson of the Nationalist People's Coalition and Bileg Ti Ilokano.

== Representation history ==
#	Image	Member	Term of office		Legislature	Party	Electoral history	Constituent LGUs
#	Image	Member	Start	End	Legislature	Party	Electoral history	Constituent LGUs
=== Ilocos Sur's 1st district for the Philippine Assembly ===
District created January 9, 1907.
1		Vicente Singson Encarnacion	October 16, 1907	October 30, 1913	1st	Progresista	Elected in 1907.	1907–1912; Cabugao, Lapog, Magsingal, Santa Catalina, Santo Domingo, Sinait, Vigan
1		Vicente Singson Encarnacion	October 16, 1907	October 30, 1913	2nd	Progresista	Re-elected in 1909.	1907–1912; Cabugao, Lapog, Magsingal, Santa Catalina, Santo Domingo, Sinait, Vigan
1		Vicente Singson Encarnacion	October 16, 1907	October 30, 1913	3rd	Progresista	Re-elected in 1912. Resigned on appointment as commissioner.	1912–1916; Bantay, Cabugao, Caoayan, Lapog, Magsingal, San Vicente, Santa Catalina, Santo Domingo, Sinait, Vigan
2		Alberto Reyes	October 30, 1913	October 16, 1916	3rd	Progresista	Elected in 1913 to finish Encarnación's term.	1912–1916; Bantay, Cabugao, Caoayan, Lapog, Magsingal, San Vicente, Santa Catalina, Santo Domingo, Sinait, Vigan
=== Ilocos Sur's 1st district for the House of Representatives of the Philippine Islands ===
(2)		Alberto Reyes	October 16, 1916	June 3, 1919	4th	Progresista	Re-elected in 1916.	1916–1922; Bantay, Cabugao, Caoayan, Lapog, Magsingal, San Vicente, Santa Catalina, Santo Domingo, Sinait, Vigan
3		Elpidio Quirino	June 3, 1919	June 6, 1922	5th	Nacionalista	Elected in 1919.	1916–1922; Bantay, Cabugao, Caoayan, Lapog, Magsingal, San Vicente, Santa Catalina, Santo Domingo, Sinait, Vigan
4		Vicente Singson Pablo	June 6, 1922	June 2, 1925	6th	Demócrata	Elected in 1922.	1922–1935; Bantay, Cabugao, Caoayan, Lapog, Magsingal, San Ildefonso, San Vicente, Santa Catalina, Santo Domingo, Sinait, Vigan
5		Simeón Ramos	June 2, 1925	June 5, 1928	7th	Demócrata	Elected in 1925.	1922–1935; Bantay, Cabugao, Caoayan, Lapog, Magsingal, San Ildefonso, San Vicente, Santa Catalina, Santo Domingo, Sinait, Vigan
6		Benito T. Soliven	June 5, 1928	June 2, 1931	8th	Nacionalista; Consolidado	Elected in 1928.	1922–1935; Bantay, Cabugao, Caoayan, Lapog, Magsingal, San Ildefonso, San Vicente, Santa Catalina, Santo Domingo, Sinait, Vigan
7		Pedro Singson Reyes	June 2, 1931	September 16, 1935	9th	Nacionalista; Consolidado	Elected in 1931.	1922–1935; Bantay, Cabugao, Caoayan, Lapog, Magsingal, San Ildefonso, San Vicente, Santa Catalina, Santo Domingo, Sinait, Vigan
7		Pedro Singson Reyes	June 2, 1931	September 16, 1935	10th	Nacionalista; Democrático	Re-elected in 1934.	1922–1935; Bantay, Cabugao, Caoayan, Lapog, Magsingal, San Ildefonso, San Vicente, Santa Catalina, Santo Domingo, Sinait, Vigan
#	Image	Member	Term of office		National Assembly	Party	Electoral history	Constituent LGUs
#	Image	Member	Start	End	National Assembly	Party	Electoral history	Constituent LGUs
=== Ilocos Sur's 1st district for the National Assembly (Commonwealth of the Philippines) ===
(6)		Benito T. Soliven	September 16, 1935	December 30, 1941	1st	Nacionalista; Demócrata Pro-Independencia	Elected in 1935.	1935–1941; Bantay, Cabugao, Caoayan, Lapog, Magsingal, San Ildefonso, San Vicente, Santa Catalina, Santo Domingo, Sinait, Vigan
(6)		Benito T. Soliven	September 16, 1935	December 30, 1941	2nd	Nacionalista	Re-elected in 1938.	1935–1941; Bantay, Cabugao, Caoayan, Lapog, Magsingal, San Ildefonso, San Vicente, Santa Catalina, Santo Domingo, Sinait, Vigan
District dissolved into the two-seat Ilocos Sur's at-large district for the National Assembly (Second Philippine Republic).
#	Image	Member	Term of office		Common wealth Congress	Party	Electoral history	Constituent LGUs
#	Image	Member	Start	End	Common wealth Congress	Party	Electoral history	Constituent LGUs
=== Ilocos Sur's 1st district for the House of Representatives of the Commonwealth of the Philippines ===
District re-created May 24, 1945.
8		Jesús O. Serrano	June 11, 1945	May 25, 1946	1st	Nacionalista	Elected in 1941.	1945–1946; Bantay, Cabugao, Caoayan, Lapog, Magsingal, San Ildefonso, San Vicente, Santa Catalina, Santo Domingo, Sinait, Vigan
#	Image	Member	Term of office		Congress	Party	Electoral history	Constituent LGUs
#	Image	Member	Start	End	Congress	Party	Electoral history	Constituent LGUs
=== Ilocos Sur's 1st district for the House of Representatives of the Philippines ===
9		Floro S. Crisólogo	May 25, 1946	December 30, 1957	1st	Nacionalista	Elected in 1946.	1946–1961; Bantay, Cabugao, Caoayan, Lapog, Magsingal, San Ildefonso, San Vicente, Santa Catalina, Santo Domingo, Sinait, Vigan
9		Floro S. Crisólogo	May 25, 1946	December 30, 1957	2nd	Liberal	Re-elected in 1949.	1946–1961; Bantay, Cabugao, Caoayan, Lapog, Magsingal, San Ildefonso, San Vicente, Santa Catalina, Santo Domingo, Sinait, Vigan
9		Floro S. Crisólogo	May 25, 1946	December 30, 1957	3rd	Liberal	Re-elected in 1953.	1946–1961; Bantay, Cabugao, Caoayan, Lapog, Magsingal, San Ildefonso, San Vicente, Santa Catalina, Santo Domingo, Sinait, Vigan
10		Faustino B. Tobia	December 30, 1957	December 30, 1961	4th	Nacionalista	Elected in 1957.	1946–1961; Bantay, Cabugao, Caoayan, Lapog, Magsingal, San Ildefonso, San Vicente, Santa Catalina, Santo Domingo, Sinait, Vigan
(9)		Floro S. Crisólogo	December 30, 1961	October 18, 1970	5th	Liberal	Elected in 1961.	1961–1972; Bantay, Cabugao, Caoayan, Magsingal, San Ildefonso, San Juan, San Vicente, Santa Catalina, Santo Domingo, Sinait, Vigan
(9)		Floro S. Crisólogo	December 30, 1961	October 18, 1970	6th	Nacionalista	Re-elected in 1965.	1961–1972; Bantay, Cabugao, Caoayan, Magsingal, San Ildefonso, San Juan, San Vicente, Santa Catalina, Santo Domingo, Sinait, Vigan
(9)		Floro S. Crisólogo	December 30, 1961	October 18, 1970	7th	Nacionalista	Re-elected in 1969. Died.	1961–1972; Bantay, Cabugao, Caoayan, Magsingal, San Ildefonso, San Juan, San Vicente, Santa Catalina, Santo Domingo, Sinait, Vigan
District dissolved into the twelve-seat Region I's at-large district for the Interim Batasang Pambansa, followed by the two-seat Ilocos Sur's at-large district for the Regular Batasang Pambansa.
District re-created February 2, 1987.
11		Chavit Singson	June 30, 1987	June 30, 1992	8th	Independent	Elected in 1987.	1987–present Bantay, Cabugao, Caoayan, Magsingal, San Ildefonso, San Juan, San Vicente, Santa Catalina, Santo Domingo, Sinait, Vigan
12		Mariano M. Tajon	June 30, 1992	June 30, 1998	9th	LDP	Elected in 1992.	1987–present Bantay, Cabugao, Caoayan, Magsingal, San Ildefonso, San Juan, San Vicente, Santa Catalina, Santo Domingo, Sinait, Vigan
12		Mariano M. Tajon	June 30, 1992	June 30, 1998	10th	Lakas	Re-elected in 1995.	1987–present Bantay, Cabugao, Caoayan, Magsingal, San Ildefonso, San Juan, San Vicente, Santa Catalina, Santo Domingo, Sinait, Vigan
13		Salacnib F. Baterina	June 30, 1998	June 30, 2007	11th	LAMMP	Elected in 1998.	1987–present Bantay, Cabugao, Caoayan, Magsingal, San Ildefonso, San Juan, San Vicente, Santa Catalina, Santo Domingo, Sinait, Vigan
13		Salacnib F. Baterina	June 30, 1998	June 30, 2007	12th	Lakas	Re-elected in 2001.	1987–present Bantay, Cabugao, Caoayan, Magsingal, San Ildefonso, San Juan, San Vicente, Santa Catalina, Santo Domingo, Sinait, Vigan
13		Salacnib F. Baterina	June 30, 1998	June 30, 2007	13th	Lakas	Re-elected in 2004.	1987–present Bantay, Cabugao, Caoayan, Magsingal, San Ildefonso, San Juan, San Vicente, Santa Catalina, Santo Domingo, Sinait, Vigan
14		Ronald Singson	June 30, 2007	March 7, 2011	14th	Lakas	Elected in 2007.	1987–present Bantay, Cabugao, Caoayan, Magsingal, San Ildefonso, San Juan, San Vicente, Santa Catalina, Santo Domingo, Sinait, Vigan
14		Ronald Singson	June 30, 2007	March 7, 2011	15th	Nacionalista	Re-elected in 2010. Resigned after a conviction.	1987–present Bantay, Cabugao, Caoayan, Magsingal, San Ildefonso, San Juan, San Vicente, Santa Catalina, Santo Domingo, Sinait, Vigan
15		Ryan Luis V. Singson	May 30, 2011	June 30, 2013	15th	Biled	Elected in 2011 to finish his brother's term.	1987–present Bantay, Cabugao, Caoayan, Magsingal, San Ildefonso, San Juan, San Vicente, Santa Catalina, Santo Domingo, Sinait, Vigan
15		Ryan Luis V. Singson	May 30, 2011	June 30, 2013	15th	Nacionalista (Biled)	Elected in 2011 to finish his brother's term.	1987–present Bantay, Cabugao, Caoayan, Magsingal, San Ildefonso, San Juan, San Vicente, Santa Catalina, Santo Domingo, Sinait, Vigan
(14)		Ronald Singson	June 30, 2013	June 30, 2016	16th	Nacionalista	Elected in 2013.	1987–present Bantay, Cabugao, Caoayan, Magsingal, San Ildefonso, San Juan, San Vicente, Santa Catalina, Santo Domingo, Sinait, Vigan
16		Deogracias Victor Savellano	June 30, 2016	June 30, 2022	17th	Nacionalista (Bileg)	Elected in 2016.	1987–present Bantay, Cabugao, Caoayan, Magsingal, San Ildefonso, San Juan, San Vicente, Santa Catalina, Santo Domingo, Sinait, Vigan
16		Deogracias Victor Savellano	June 30, 2016	June 30, 2022	18th	Nacionalista (Bileg)	Re-elected in 2019.	1987–present Bantay, Cabugao, Caoayan, Magsingal, San Ildefonso, San Juan, San Vicente, Santa Catalina, Santo Domingo, Sinait, Vigan
(14)		Ronald Singson	June 30, 2022	Incumbent	19th	NPC (Bileg)	Elected in 2022.	1987–present Bantay, Cabugao, Caoayan, Magsingal, San Ildefonso, San Juan, San Vicente, Santa Catalina, Santo Domingo, Sinait, Vigan
(14)		Ronald Singson	June 30, 2022	Incumbent	20th	NPC (Bileg)	Re-elected in 2025.	1987–present Bantay, Cabugao, Caoayan, Magsingal, San Ildefonso, San Juan, San Vicente, Santa Catalina, Santo Domingo, Sinait, Vigan

== Election results ==
=== 2025 ===
Candidate	Party	Votes	%
Ronald Singson (incumbent)	Nationalist People's Coalition	143,361	92.36
Charles "DB" Savellano	Independent	11,854	7.64
Total		155,215	100.00
Valid votes		155,215	85.52
Invalid/blank votes		26,272	14.48
Total votes		181,487	100.00
Registered voters/turnout		205,761	88.20
Nationalist People's Coalition hold			
Source: Commission on Election

=== 2022 ===
2022 Philippine House of Representatives elections
Party	Candidate	Votes	%
NPC	Ronald Singson	99,376	57.48
Nacionalista	Deogracias Victor Savellano	73,503	42.52
Total votes		172,879	100.00
NPC gain from Nacionalista			

=== 2019 ===
2022 Philippine House of Representatives elections
Party	Candidate	Votes	%
Nacionalista	Deogracias Victor Savellano	76,165	50.66
NPC	Ronald Singson	73,012	48.56
Independent	Ben Aguilar	1,165	0.77
Total votes		150,342	100.00
Nacionalista hold			

=== 2016 ===
2016 Philippine House of Representatives elections
Party	Candidate	Votes	%
Nacionalista	Deogracias Victor Savellano	83,050	
Independent	Christian Daniel Purisima	55,193	
Margin of victory			
Invalid or blank votes		11,711	
Total votes		149,954	
Nacionalista hold			

=== 2013 ===
2013 Philippine House of Representatives elections
Party	Candidate	Votes	%
Nacionalista	Ronald Singson	64,373	58.52
Liberal	Trandy Baterina	31,978	28.85
Margin of victory		32,935	29.22%
Invalid or blank votes		14,502	13.08
Total votes		110,853	100.00
Nacionalista hold			

=== 2011 special ===
2011 Philippine House of Representatives special election at Ilocos Sur's 1st district
Party	Candidate	Votes	%	±%
Biled	Ryan Luis Singson	71,995	70.28	−1.99
Liberal	Trandy Baterina	30,445	29.72	1.99
Margin of victory		41,550	40.56	−3.98
Rejected ballots		52	0.05	−9.01
Turnout		102,492	63.28	−23.03
Biled gain from Nacionalista		Swing	−1.99	

=== 2010 ===
2010 Philippine House of Representatives elections
Party	Candidate	Votes	%
Lakas–Kampi	Ronald Singson	91,875	72.27
Liberal	Trandy Baterina	35,254	27.73
Valid ballots		127,129	90.94
Invalid or blank votes		12,660	9.06
Total votes		139,789	100.00
Lakas–Kampi hold			

== See also ==
- Legislative districts of Ilocos Sur
