= Caoayan =

Municipality in Ilocos Sur, Philippines

- Municipality
- Municipality of Caoayan
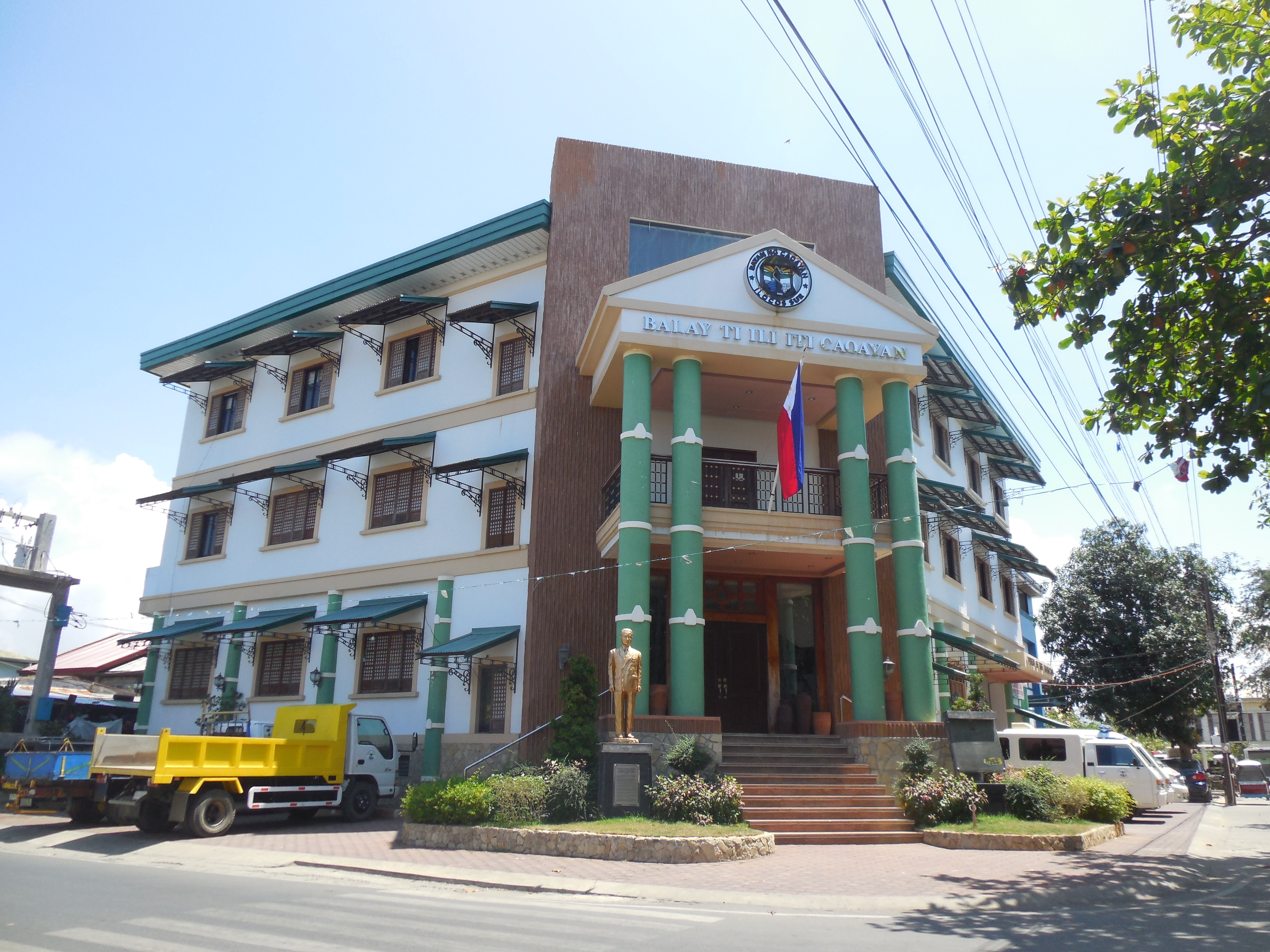
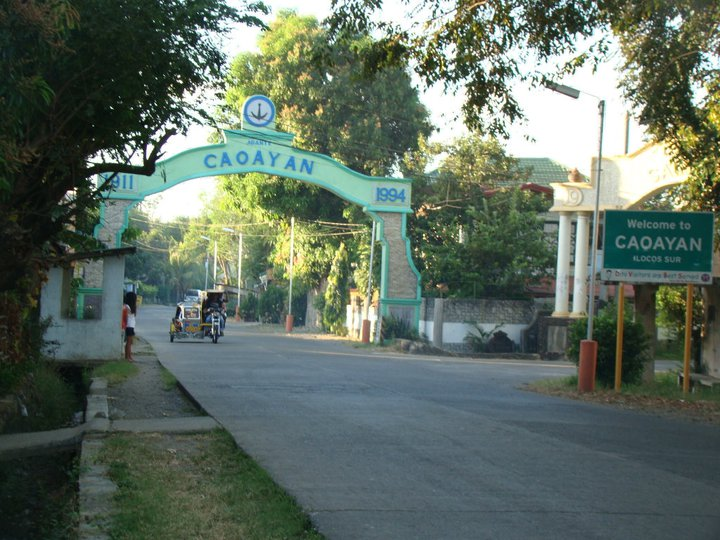
- Our Lady of Hope Parish Church Municipal Hall Welcome arch

- Seal
- Etymology: Bamboo
- Motto: Pardas Caoayan!
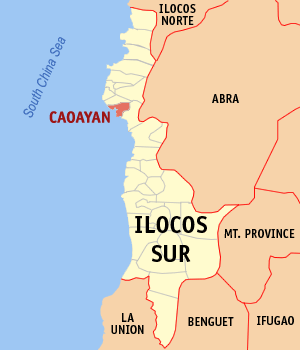
- Map of Ilocos Sur with Caoayan highlighted
- Interactive map of Caoayan
- Location within the Philippines
- Coordinates: 17°32′49″N 120°22′59″E
- Country: Philippines
- Region: Ilocos Region
- Province: Ilocos Sur
- District: 1st district
- Founded: 1825
- Chartered: 1911
- Barangays: 17 (see Barangays)

Government
  - Type: Sangguniang Bayan
  - Mayor: Germelina Singson Goulart
  - Vice Mayor: Juan Paolo Singson Ancheta
  - Representative: Ronald Verzosa Singson
  - Municipal Council: Members: Lina Quilana; Jose Quadra; Darwin Albalos; Jun Ramos; Melnan Atendido; Elmo Alconcel; Armand Quitevis; Demetrio Briones
  - Electorate: 14,324 voters (2025)

Area
  - Total: 17.42 km^{2} (6.73 sq mi)
- Elevation: 5.0 m (16.4 ft)
- Highest elevation: 44 m (144 ft)
- Lowest elevation: 0 m (0 ft)

Population (2024 census)
  - Total: 19,715
  - Density: 1,132/km^{2} (2,931/sq mi)
  - Households: 4,838

Economy
  - Income class: 2nd municipal income class
  - Poverty incidence: 4.42% (2023)
  - Revenue: ₱ 278.1 million (2024)
  - Assets: ₱ 830 million (2024)
  - Expenditure: ₱ 143.2 million (2024)
  - Liabilities: ₱ 100.4 million (2024)

Service provider
  - Electricity: Ilocos Sur Electric Cooperative (ISECO)
- Time zone: UTC+8 (PST)
- ZIP code: 2702
- PSGC: 0102907000
- IDD : area code: +63 (0)77
- Native languages: Ilocano; Tagalog

Caoayan, officially the Municipality of Caoayan (Ilocano: Ili ti Caoayan; Filipino: Bayan ng Caoayan), is a municipality in the province of Ilocos Sur, Philippines. According to the 2024 census, it has a population of 19,715 people.

== Etymology ==
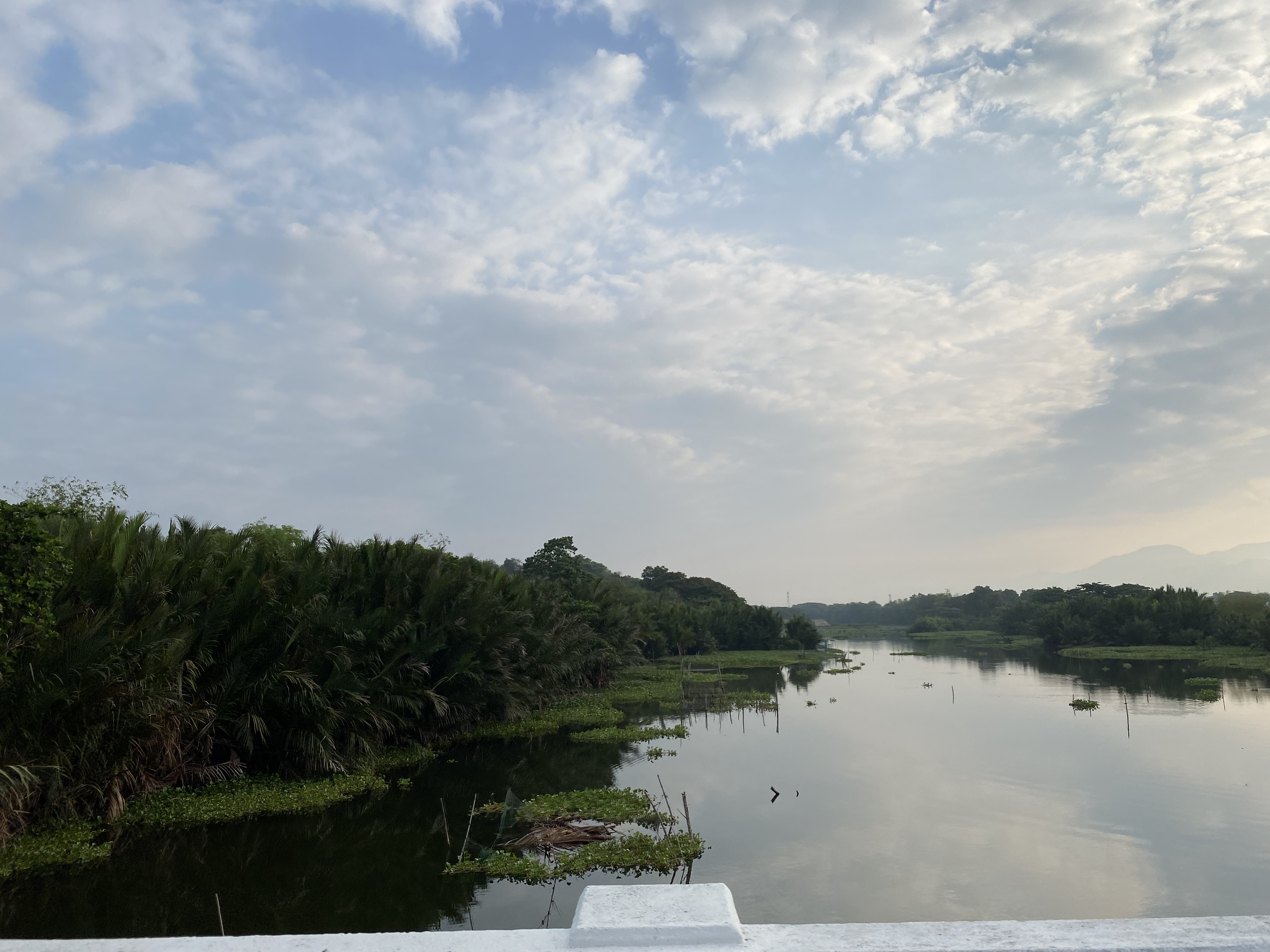
Mestizo River from the Caoayan Bridge

Prior to the arrival of Spanish expeditions to the area, the Port of Pandan was an important trading post for Chinese and inter-island vessels, and one of the commodities once traded there was bamboo. Later on, Spanish authorities who patrolled the area for pirates known as tirong, came to a place near the island called Puro, and asked the name of the place. Thinking that they wanted to know the name of the bamboo floating in rafts on the Baggoc River waiting to be traded, the natives answered "kawayan." The Spanish then listed the place's name as Caoayan.

From that time on, the place's registered name was Caoayan, and has been registered as a barrio of the capital town Bigaan. It became a parish in 1825. The first missionaries who founded Saint Paul College of Ilocos Sur landed in Pandan. A commemorative marker stands at the Port of Pandan to commemorate the event.

== History ==
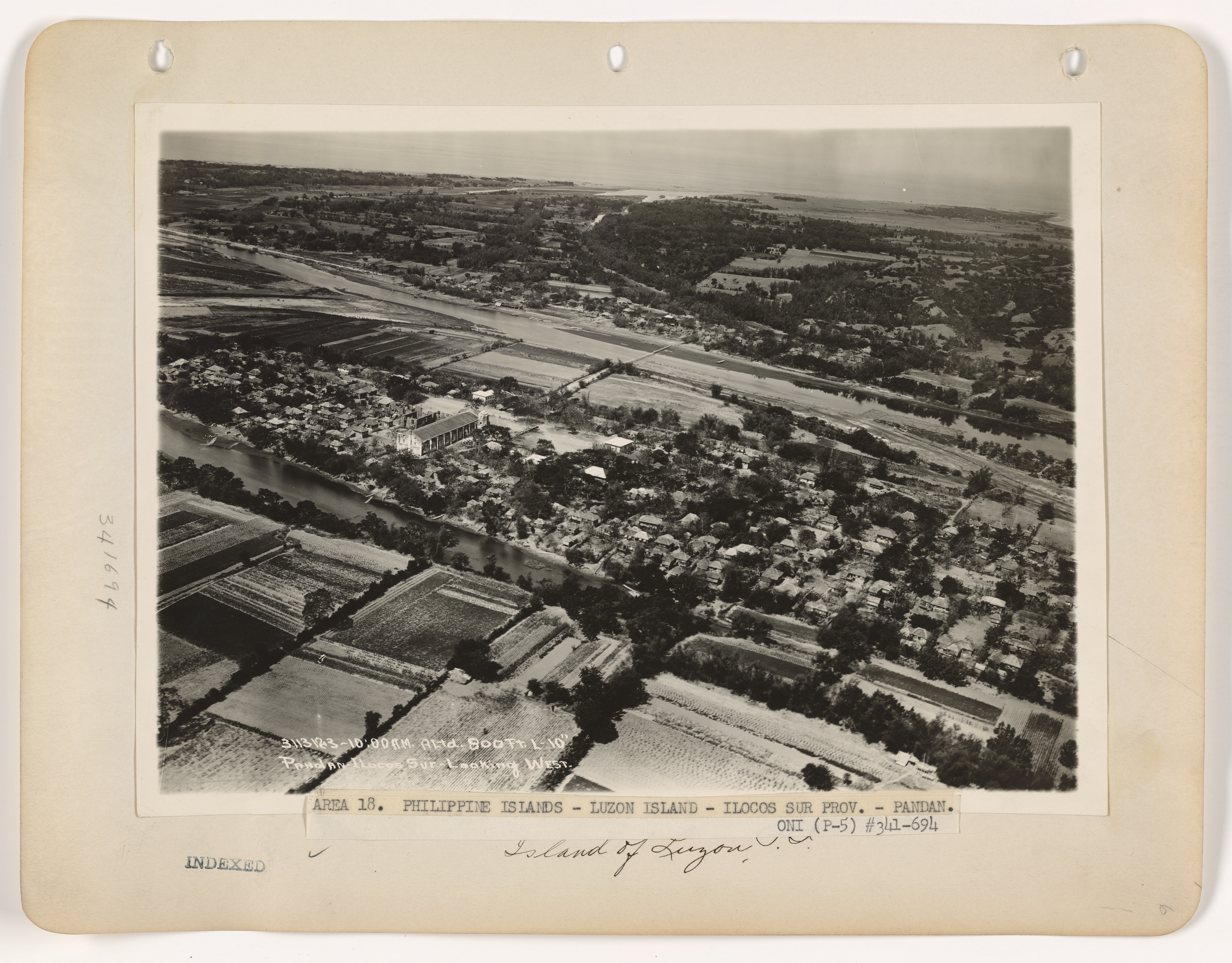
Aerial view of Caoayan (note the caption stating "Pandan", a barangay of Caoayan), early 20th century, with the Mestizo River and Caoayan Church visible

Caoayan, which was once a barrio of Ciudad Fernandina (now Vigan) became a municipality in 1911. Don Dimas Querubin was the town's founder and got elected as the first municipal mayor. He was succeeded by his son, Don Asterio Q. Querubin I, who served for four terms and became president of the Mayors' League of Ilocos Sur.

Then in 1998, the first son of Mayor Asterio Q. Querubin, former Naval Officer Manuel Reyes Querubin became the Mayor of Caoayan, completing three generations of Querubins from its founder Don Dimas, Don Asterio, and Manuel 'Nonong.'

== Geography ==
Caoayan is situated 3.78 kilometres (2.35 mi) from the provincial capital Vigan, and 406.62 kilometres (252.66 mi) from the country's capital city of Manila.

=== Barangays ===
Caoayan is bordered by Vigan to the north and Santa to the west. Caoayan is politically subdivided into 17 barangays. Each barangay consists of puroks and some have sitios.

- Anonang Mayor
- Anonang Menor
- Baggoc
- Callaguip
- Caparacadan
- Don Alejandro Quirolgico (Poblacion)
- Don Dimas Querubin (Poblacion)
- Don Lorenzo Querubin (Poblacion)
- Fuerte
- Manangat
- Naguilian
- Nansuagao
- Pandan
- Pantay Tamurong
- Pantay-Quitiquit
- Puro
- Villamar

=== Climate ===
Climate data for Caoayan, Ilocos Sur
Month	Jan	Feb	Mar	Apr	May	Jun	Jul	Aug	Sep	Oct	Nov	Dec	Year
Mean daily maximum °C (°F)	30 (86)	31 (88)	33 (91)	34 (93)	33 (91)	31 (88)	30 (86)	30 (86)	30 (86)	31 (88)	30 (86)	29 (84)	31 (88)
Mean daily minimum °C (°F)	19 (66)	19 (66)	21 (70)	23 (73)	25 (77)	25 (77)	24 (75)	24 (75)	24 (75)	22 (72)	21 (70)	19 (66)	22 (72)
Average precipitation mm (inches)	9 (0.4)	11 (0.4)	13 (0.5)	23 (0.9)	92 (3.6)	122 (4.8)	153 (6.0)	137 (5.4)	139 (5.5)	141 (5.6)	42 (1.7)	14 (0.6)	896 (35.4)
Average rainy days	4.6	4.0	6.2	9.1	19.5	23.2	24.0	22.5	21.5	15.2	10.5	6.0	166.3
Source: Meteoblue (modeled/calculated data, not measured locally)

== Demographics ==
Population census of Caoayan

Year	Pop.	±% p.a.
1903	6,201	—
1918	7,860	+1.59%
1939	8,306	+0.26%
1948	9,064	+0.98%
1960	11,045	+1.66%
1970	12,670	+1.38%

Year	Pop.	±% p.a.
1975	13,375	+1.09%
1980	14,070	+1.02%
1990	15,637	+1.06%
1995	15,799	+0.19%
2000	17,199	+1.84%
2007	18,914	+1.32%

Year	Pop.	±% p.a.
2010	18,551	−0.70%
2015	19,861	+1.31%
2020	19,574	−0.31%
2024	19,715	+0.17%

Source: Philippine Statistics Authority

In the 2024 census, Caoayan had a population of 19,715 people. The population density was 1,100 inhabitants per square kilometre (2,800/sq mi).

== Economy ==
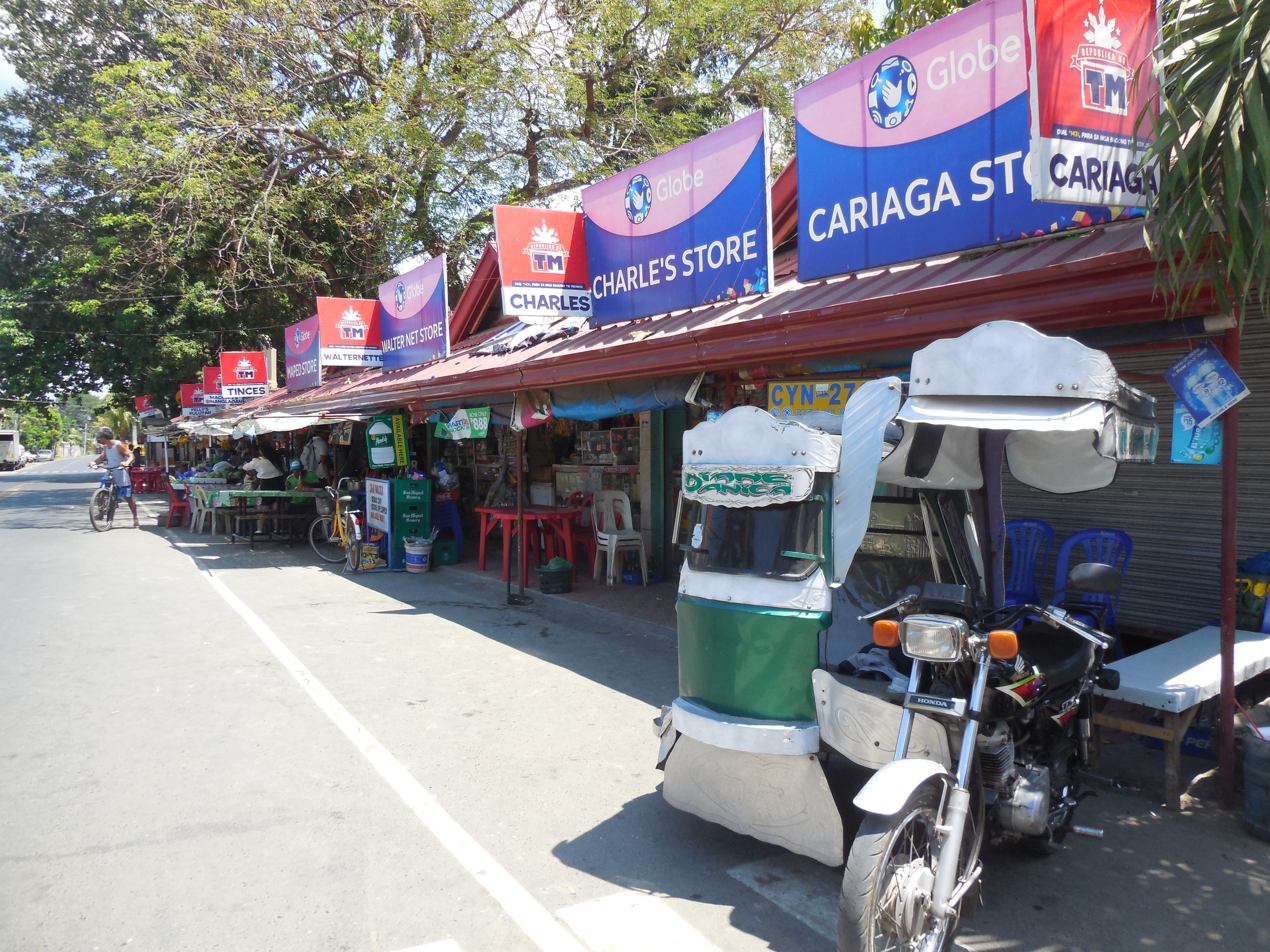
A series of roadside eateries just outside of the town's parish church in Caoayan, Ilocos Sur

Poverty incidence of Caoayan (%)

Source: Philippine Statistics Authority

Due to its geographical location, fishing has been the main source of livelihood of the inhabitants. Next is agriculture where farmers planted onions, tomatoes, rice and corn bound. The town is also known for its loom-weaving industry which dates back before Spanish regime. Palafox and Associates have declared Caoayan as the fish-bowl and onion basket of Ilocos Sur.

Boat-sailing was one of the major industries of Caoayan but was eased out as means of transportation with the onset of modern highways especially those connecting the Ilocos provinces to Manila and the Cagayan Valley. The provincial government has recognized the Caoayano skill by awarding locals who are engaged in boat-making and calesa-manufacturing as living legends of Ilocos Sur.

Currently, LGU-Caoayan has launched the country's first ever One-Barangay, One-Product (OBOP) program. Although its official One-Town, One-Product (OTOP) as per DTI's initiatives is Abel Iloko, only 5 out of the 17 barangays are into loom-weaving. Under Mayor Goulart, the OBOP was designed to give all barangays equal economic development opportunity. Under this program, non- Abel Iloko barangays are empowered to adopt their respective OBOPs depending on the raw materials that are indigenous and abundant in their communities.

The OBOP has now produced a wide array of local products: processed Rosangis (clam shells), Bagoong Ipon, native Cakes and Delicacies, processed peanuts, Pickled Singkamas (turnips), Smoked Tilapia, Corn Husk souvenir items, Water Lily handicrafts, Smoked/De-boned Bangus (milkfish), with others that are following soon. Abel Iloko weavers have also undergone training programs that will enable them to come up with high-end Abel outputs.

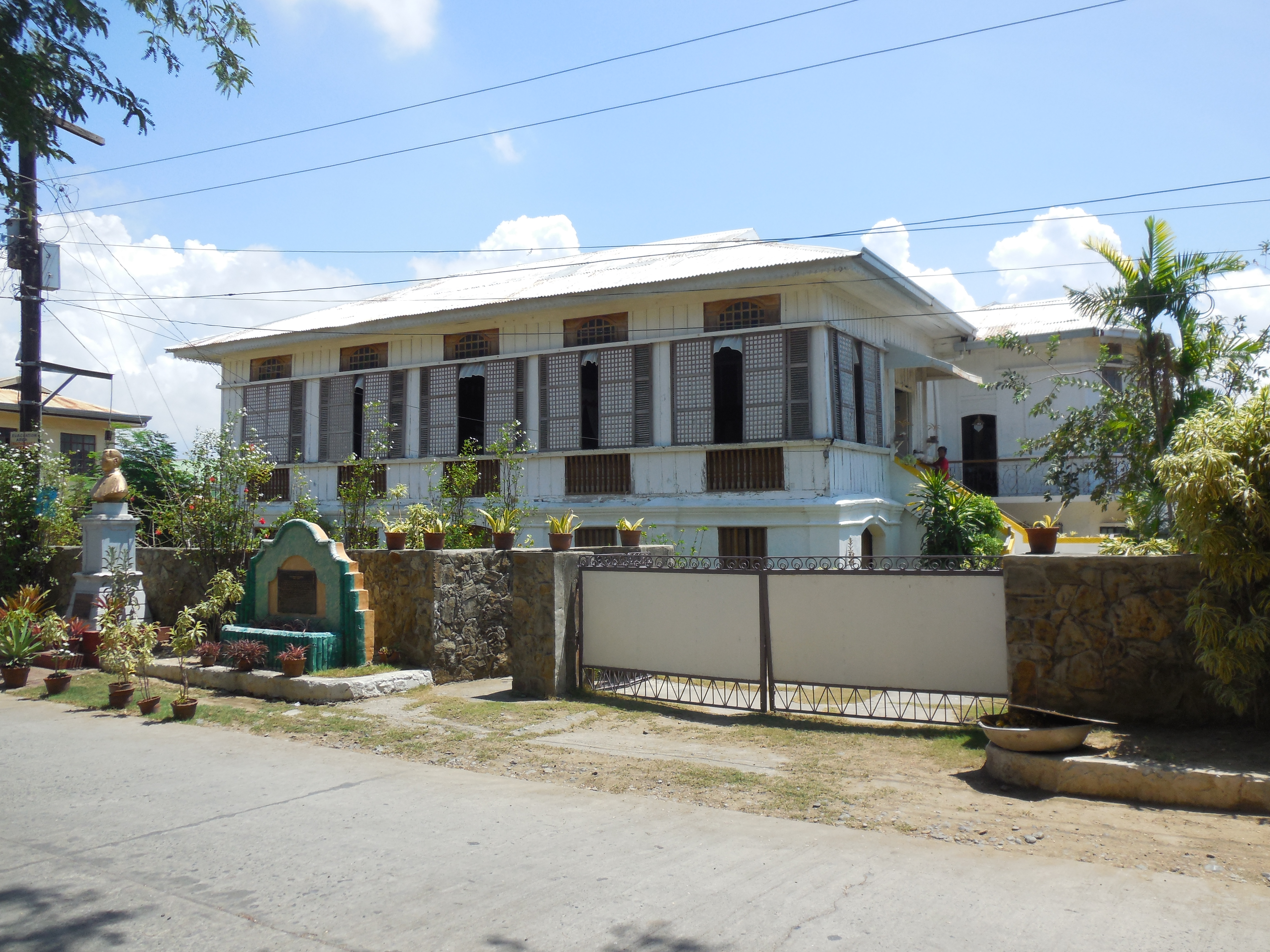
The ancestral house of Don Dimas Querubin, declared an Important Cultural Property by the National Museum

Caoayan is also presently riding on the coattails of Vigan, which has been declared as one of the new 7 wonder cities of the world. To be able to get a fair share of the city's tourist influx, Caoayan opened the Pinakbet Farm in Barangay Nansuagao, offering Ilokano dish - Pinakbet - as its centerpiece. These tourism-based projects have been launched to achieve the town's vision of improving all Caoayanos' standard of living through additional revenue and employment generation.

== Government ==
=== Local government ===
Caoayan, belonging to the first congressional district of the province of Ilocos Sur, is governed by a mayor designated as its local chief executive and by a municipal council as its legislative body in accordance with the Local Government Code. The mayor, vice mayor, and the councilors are elected directly by the people through an election which is being held every three years.

=== Elected officials ===
Members of the Municipal Council (2025–2028)
Position	Name
Congressman	Ronald V. Singson
Mayor	Germelina S. Goulart
Vice-Mayor	Juan Paolo S. Ancheta
Councilors	Ernelina P. Quilana
Councilors	Jose Q. Quadra
Councilors	Darwin R. Albalos
Councilors	Romeo R. Ramos Jr.
Councilors	Melnan Q. Atendido
Councilors	Guillermo Rufino Q. Alconcel
Councilors	Armand M. Quitevis
Councilors	Demetrio M. Briones

== Education ==
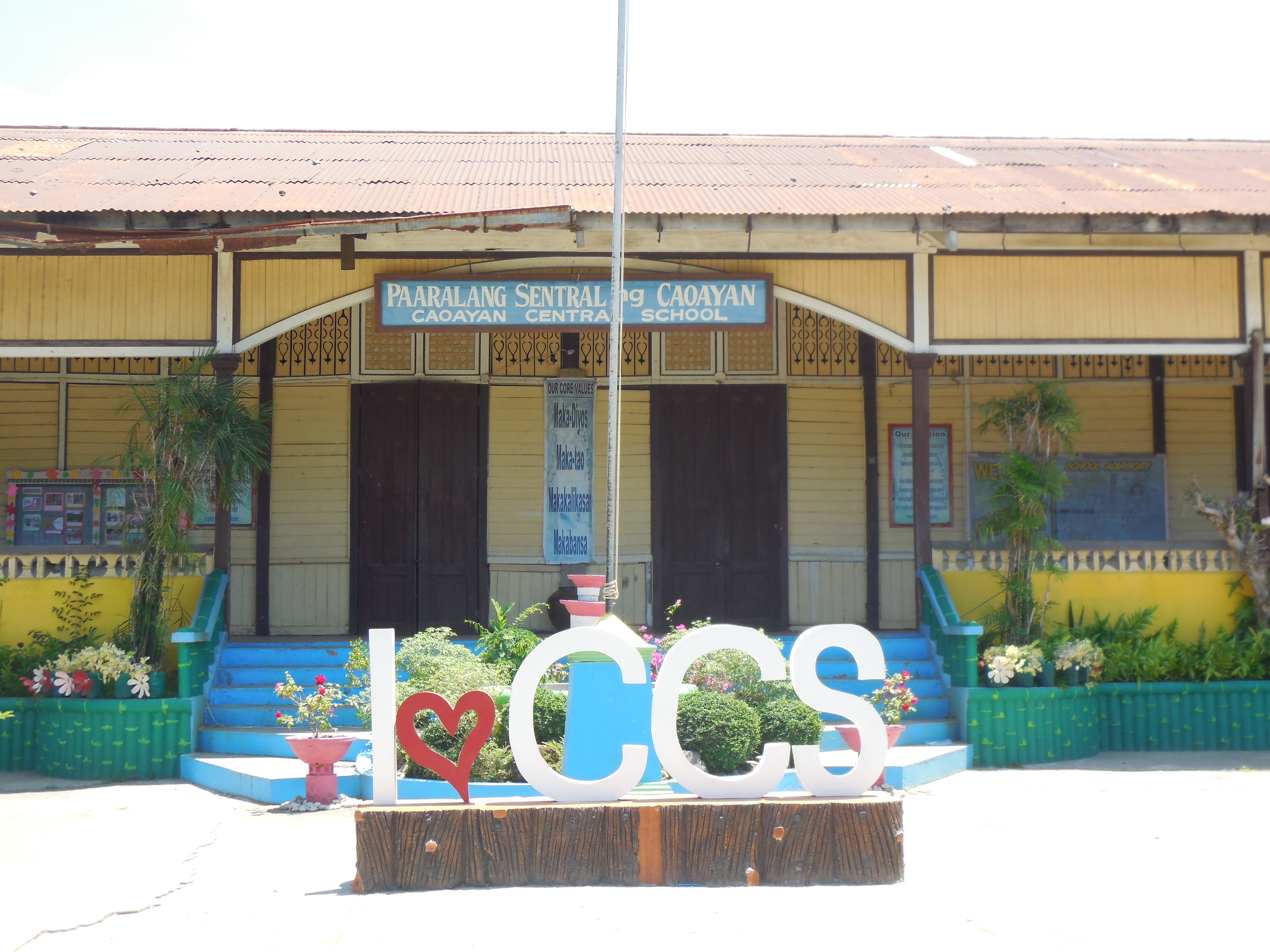
Caoayan Central School

The Caoayan Schools District Office governs all private and public education within the municipality.

=== Primary and elementary schools ===
- Anonang-Naguilian Comm. Sch.
- Baggoc-P. Quitiquit Elementary School
- Cal-laguip Elementary School
- Caoayan Central School
- Caparacadan Primary School
- Fuerte Elementary School
- Nansuagao Elementary School
- Pantay Tamurong Elementary School
- Pandan Elementary School
- Pantay Quitiquit Primary School
- Puro Elementary School
- Villamar Elementary School

=== Secondary schools ===
- Caoayan National High School
- Pantay Tamurong National High School
- Puro National High School

== Notable personalities ==
- Elpidio Quirino - 6th President of the Philippines and the first Ilocano President of the Philippines. He served as representative in the district.
