= San Juan, Ilocos Sur =

Municipality in Ilocos Sur, Philippines

San Juan
- Municipality
- Municipality of San Juan
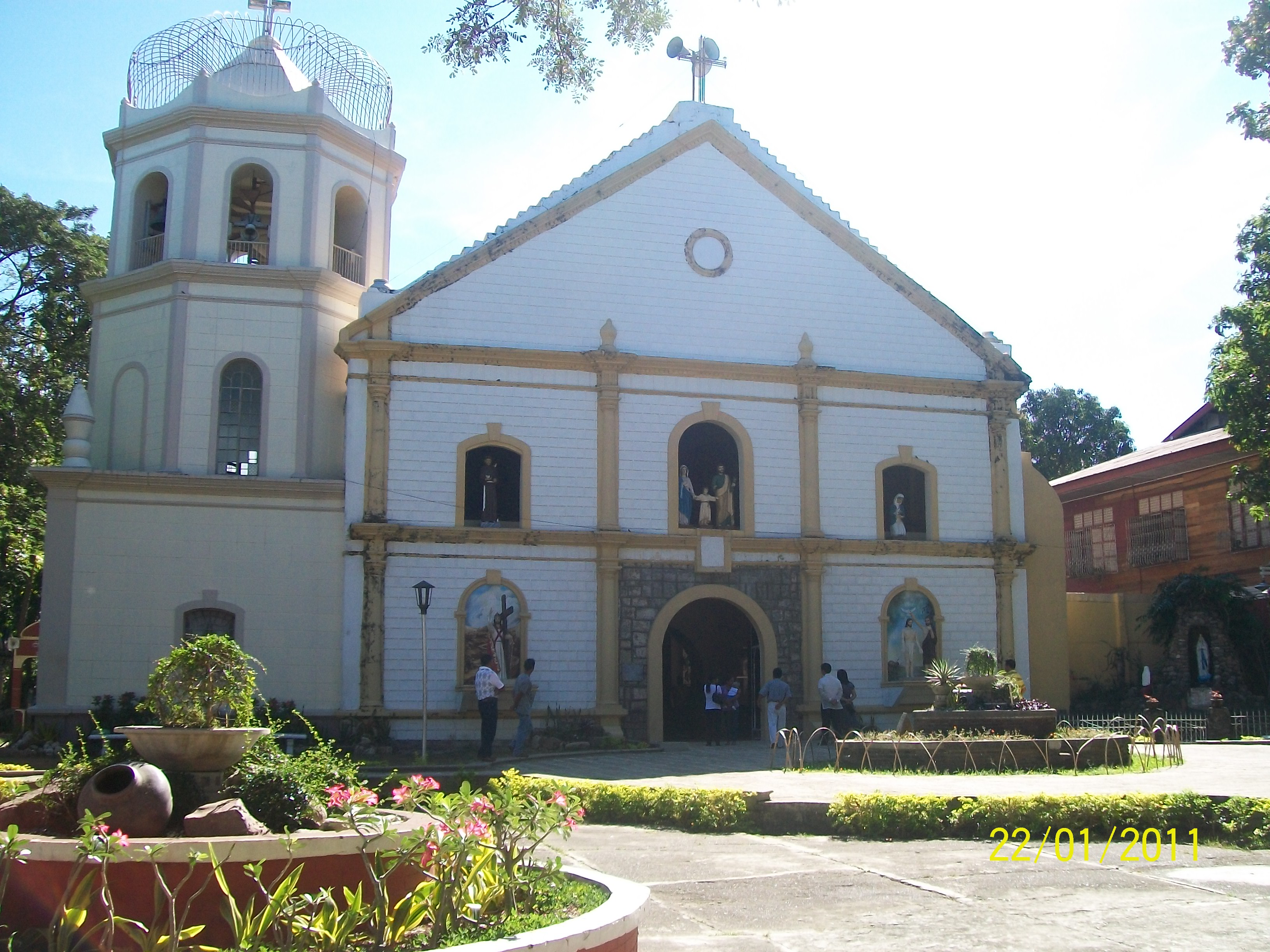
- St. John the Baptist Catholic Church

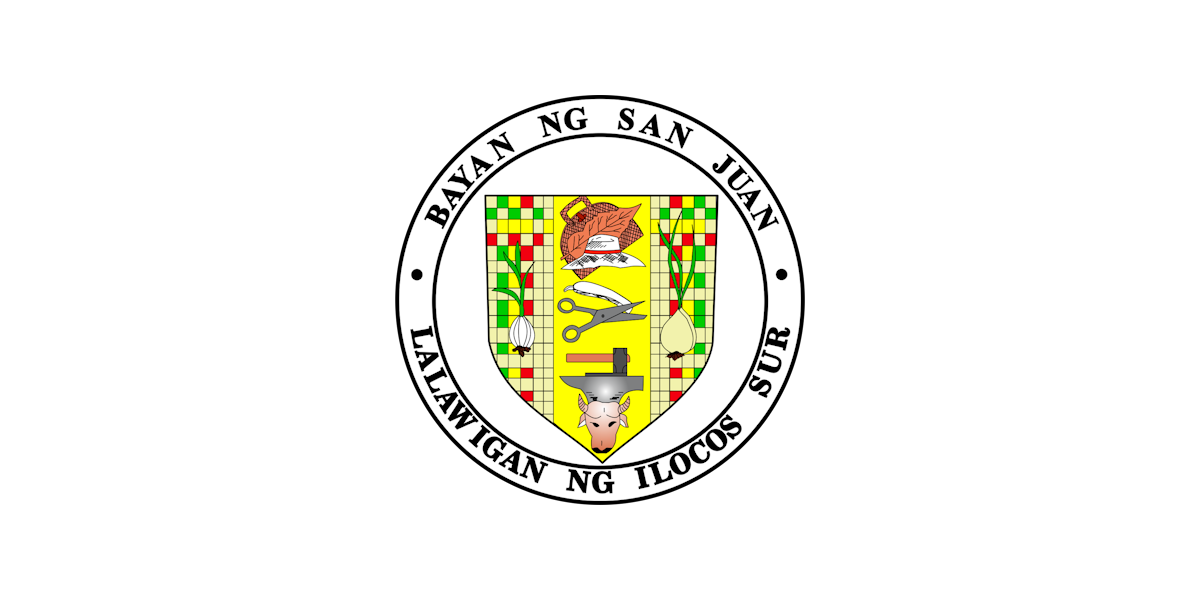
- Flag Seal
- Nickname: Buri Capital of the Philippines
- Motto: Tattan San Juan! (Right Now San Juan)
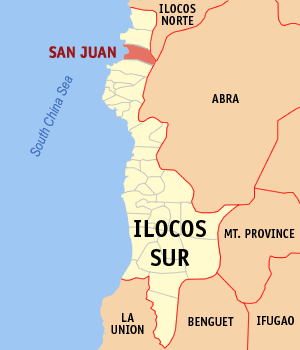
- Map of Ilocos Sur with San Juan highlighted
- Interactive map of San Juan
- Location within the Philippines
- Coordinates: 17°44′35″N 120°27′30″E
- Country: Philippines
- Region: Ilocos Region
- Province: Ilocos Sur
- District: 1st district
- Named for: St. John the Baptist
- Barangays: 32 (see Barangays)

Government
  - Type: Sangguniang Bayan
  - Mayor: Ma. Elaine A. Sarmiento
  - Vice Mayor: Benjamin V. Sarmiento
  - Representative: Ronald Singson
  - Municipal Council: Members: Rizalina A. Valle; Cresencio G. Valle; Gem Paula V. Lucero; Michael B. Sumagit; Edwin B. Singzon; Rafael Vincent P. Ochosa; Florante A. Ramos; Domingo M. Oli
  - Electorate: 18,337 voters (2025)

Area
  - Total: 64.37 km^{2} (24.85 sq mi)
- Elevation: 41 m (135 ft)
- Highest elevation: 307 m (1,007 ft)
- Lowest elevation: 0 m (0 ft)

Population (2024 census)
  - Total: 26,709
  - Density: 414.9/km^{2} (1,075/sq mi)
  - Households: 6,735

Economy
  - Income class: 1st municipal income class
  - Poverty incidence: 5.33% (2023)
  - Revenue: ₱ 1,132 million (2024)
  - Assets: ₱ 3,150 million (2024)
  - Expenditure: ₱ 110.1 million (2024)
  - Liabilities: ₱ 176.9 million (2024)

Service provider
  - Electricity: Ilocos Sur Electric Cooperative (ISECO)
- Time zone: UTC+8 (PST)
- ZIP code: 2731
- PSGC: 0102920000
- IDD : area code: +63 (0)77
- Native languages: Ilocano; Tagalog

San Juan, officially the Municipality of San Juan (Ilocano: Ili ti San Juan; Filipino: Bayan ng San Juan), formerly called as Lapog, is a municipality in the province of Ilocos Sur, Philippines. According to the 2024 census, it has a population of 26,709 people.

The town produces the most number of goods made of buri leaf in the province. it is recognized sometimes as the "Buri Capital of Ilocos Sur".

== Etymology ==
The town was named in honor of its patron, St. John the Baptist.

== History ==
The town was established in 1772 as Lapog. Over the years, the name of the municipality went through a series of changes. The early settlers and occupants called it Lapo, short for Lapo-Lapo, a tall grass which grew everywhere in the area. In 1772, Don Tomas Aquino, the first local leader, initiated the organization of the scattered communities into one, calling the place "Lapog", a derivative of local vernacular Lap-Lapog which means unirrigated land.

It was stricken by all sorts of plagues and epidemics (like the smallpox epidemics of 1808 and 1918–19, locust infestation in 1903, and destruction of ricefields by worms called "arabas" in 1905). Americans destroyed the town hall in 1903. Despite these, San Juan progressed into a prosperous community.

For 189 years, Lapog remained in the records as the official name of the town until June 18, 1961, when Republic Act No. 3386 was enacted to rename the town, "San Juan". Since most of the inhabitants were of the belief that religious names bring peace, happiness, and prosperity, the town was renamed San Juan, after the name of its patron saint, Saint John the Baptist.

== Geography ==
The Municipality of San Juan is bordered by Cabugao to the north, Magsingal to the south, the provinces of Ilocos Norte to the north and Abra to the east.

San Juan is situated 21.42 kilometres (13.31 mi) from the provincial capital Vigan, and 422.35 kilometres (262.44 mi) from the country's capital city of Manila.

=== Barangays ===
San Juan is politically subdivided into 32 barangays. Each barangay consists of puroks and some have sitios.

- Asilang
- Bacsil
- Baliw
- Bannuar (Poblacion)
- Barbar
- Cabanglotan
- Cacandongan
- Camanggaan
- Camindoroan
- Caronoan
- Darao city
- Dardarat
- Guimod Norte
- Guimod Sur
- Immayos Norte
- Immayos Sur
- Labnig
- Lapting
- Lira (Poblacion)
- Malamin
- Muraya
- Nagsabaran
- Nagsupotan
- Pandayan (Poblacion)
- Refaro
- Resurreccion (Poblacion)
- Sabangan
- San Isidro
- Saoang
- Solotsolot
- Sunggiam
- Surngit

=== Climate ===
Climate data for San Juan, Ilocos Sur
| Month | Jan | Feb | Mar | Apr | May | Jun | Jul | Aug | Sep | Oct | Nov | Dec | Year |
|---|---|---|---|---|---|---|---|---|---|---|---|---|---|
| Mean daily maximum °C (°F) | 30 (86) | 31 (88) | 32 (90) | 34 (93) | 33 (91) | 31 (88) | 30 (86) | 30 (86) | 30 (86) | 31 (88) | 30 (86) | 29 (84) | 31 (88) |
| Mean daily minimum °C (°F) | 18 (64) | 19 (66) | 21 (70) | 23 (73) | 24 (75) | 25 (77) | 24 (75) | 24 (75) | 24 (75) | 22 (72) | 21 (70) | 19 (66) | 22 (72) |
| Average precipitation mm (inches) | 9 (0.4) | 11 (0.4) | 13 (0.5) | 23 (0.9) | 92 (3.6) | 122 (4.8) | 153 (6.0) | 137 (5.4) | 139 (5.5) | 141 (5.6) | 42 (1.7) | 14 (0.6) | 896 (35.4) |
| Average rainy days | 4.6 | 4.0 | 6.2 | 9.1 | 19.5 | 23.2 | 24.0 | 22.5 | 21.5 | 15.2 | 10.5 | 6.0 | 166.3 |
Source: Meteoblue (modeled/calculated data, not measured locally)

== Demographics ==
Population census of San Juan

| Year | Pop. | ±% p.a. |
|---|---|---|
| 1903 | 7,035 | — |
| 1918 | 9,791 | +2.23% |
| 1939 | 10,674 | +0.41% |
| 1948 | 9,777 | −0.97% |
| 1960 | 12,654 | +2.17% |
| 1970 | 14,987 | +1.70% |

| Year | Pop. | ±% p.a. |
|---|---|---|
| 1975 | 16,329 | +1.73% |
| 1980 | 17,443 | +1.33% |
| 1990 | 20,328 | +1.54% |
| 1995 | 21,222 | +0.81% |
| 2000 | 23,146 | +1.88% |
| 2007 | 23,808 | +0.39% |

| Year | Pop. | ±% p.a. |
|---|---|---|
| 2010 | 25,199 | +2.09% |
| 2015 | 26,411 | +0.90% |
| 2020 | 26,674 | +0.21% |
| 2024 | 26,709 | +0.03% |

Source: Philippine Statistics Authority

In the 2024 census, San Juan had a population of 26,709 people. The population density was 410 inhabitants per square kilometre (1,100/sq mi).

== Economy ==
Poverty incidence of San Juan (%)

Source: Philippine Statistics Authority

== Government ==
=== Local government ===
San Juan, belonging to the first congressional district of the province of Ilocos Sur, is governed by a mayor designated as its local chief executive and by a municipal council as its legislative body in accordance with the Local Government Code. The mayor, vice mayor, and the councilors are elected directly by the people through an election which is being held every three years.

=== Elected officials ===
Members of the Municipal Council (2019–2022)
| Position | Name |
|---|---|
| Congressman | Deogracias Victor B. Savellano |
| Mayor | Ma. Elaine A. Sarmiento |
| Vice-Mayor | Benjamin V. Sarmiento |
| Councilors | Rizalina A. Valle |
| Councilors | Cresencio G. Valle |
| Councilors | Gem Paula V. Lucero |
| Councilors | Michael B. Sumagit |
| Councilors | Edwin B. Singzon |
| Councilors | Rafael Vincent P. Ochosa |
| Councilors | Florante A. Ramos |
| Councilors | Domingo M. Oli |

== Education ==
The San Juan Schools District Office governs all educational institution within the municipality.

=== Primary and elementary schools ===
- Asilang Primary School
- Bacsil Community School
- Barbar Elementary School
- Camanggaan Elementary School
- Camindoroan Community School
- Caronoan Elementary School
- Darao Elementary School
- Dardarat Elementary School
- Don F. Quilala Memorial Elementary School
- Labnig Elementary School
- Malamin Integrated School
- Muraya Primary School
- Nagsabaran Elementary School
- Nagsuputan Elementary School
- Refaro Elementary School
- Sabangan Elementary School
- San Isidro Elementary School
- San Juan North Central School
- San Juan South Central School
- Saoang Elementary School
- Singson Verzosa Elementary School
- Solotsolot Elementary School
- Sunggiam Elementary School

=== Secondary schools ===
- Nagsuputan National High School
- San Juan Institute, Ilocos Sur
- San Juan National High School
- Solotsolot National High School
- Malamin Integrated School

== See also ==
- List of renamed cities and municipalities in the Philippines
