= Santo Domingo, Ilocos Sur =

Municipality in Ilocos Sur, Philippines

Santo Domingo
- Municipality
- Municipality of Santo Domingo
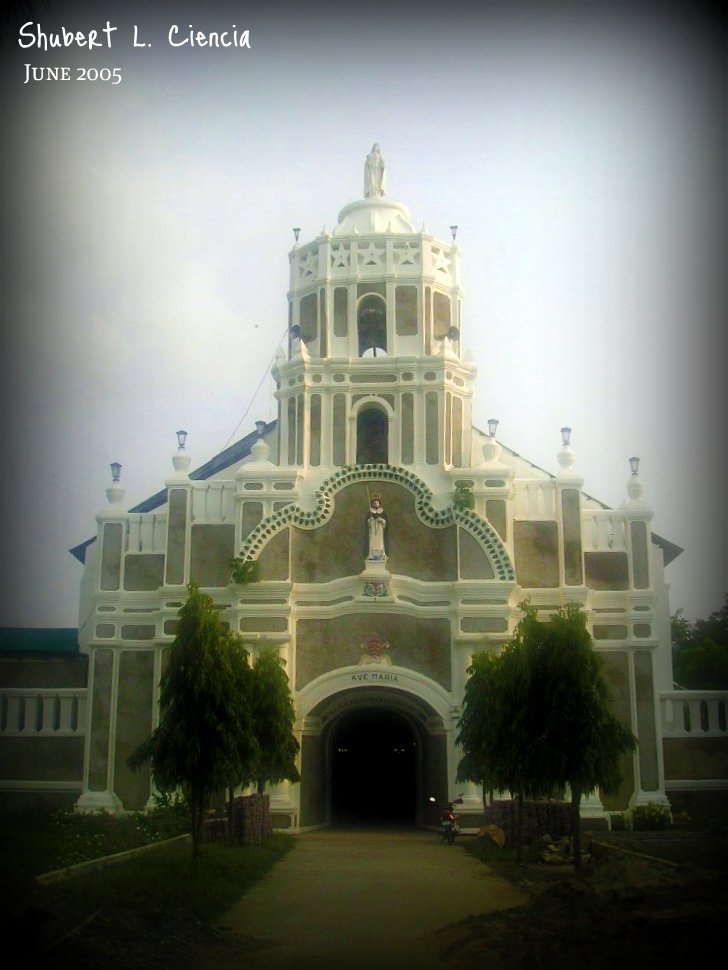
- St. Dominic of Guzman Parish Church of Santo Domingo

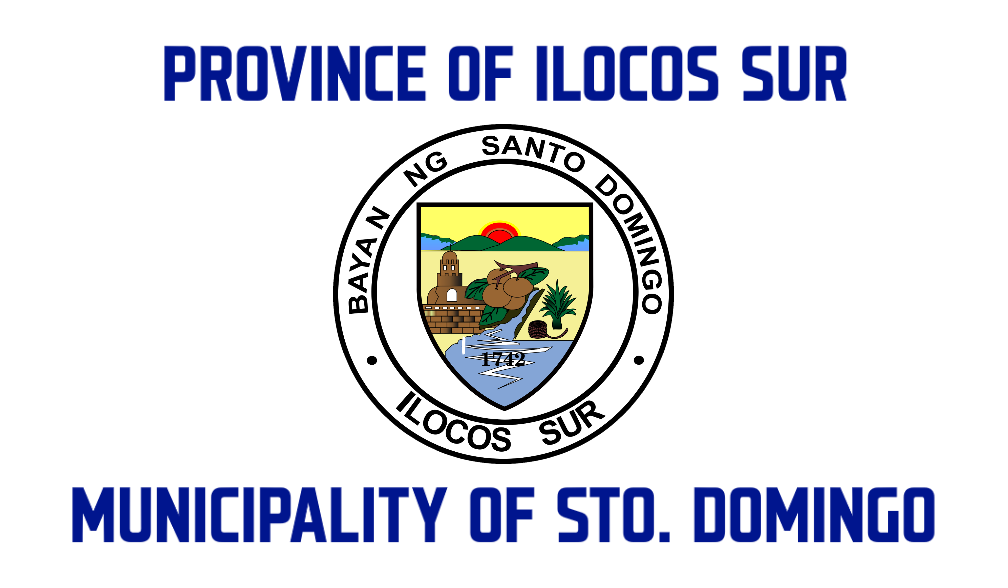
- Flag Seal
- Motto: Alisto, Santo Domingo!
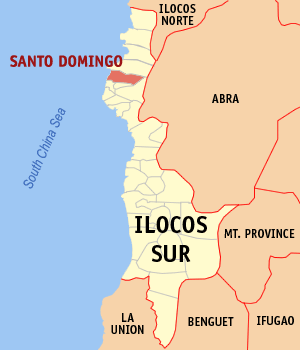
- Map of Ilocos Sur with Santo Domingo highlighted
- Interactive map of Santo Domingo
- Location within the Philippines
- Coordinates: 17°38′29″N 120°24′39″E
- Country: Philippines
- Region: Ilocos Region
- Province: Ilocos Sur
- District: 1st district
- Named for: Saint Dominic
- Barangays: 36 (see Barangays)

Government
  - Type: Sangguniang Bayan
  - Mayor: Annea Cassandra Singson De Leon
  - Vice Mayor: Felix Ingan
  - Representative: Ronald Singson
  - Municipal Council: Members: Lucio Manuel Denver Alvarado; Goodz Ingan; Eugene R. Tadeja; Benedict Singin De Vera II; Jane De Vera - Martinez; Michael Emili Villanueva Figueras; Giovanni Velasco; Rizaldy Rosario
  - Electorate: 20,229 voters (2025)

Area
  - Total: 55.49 km^{2} (21.42 sq mi)
- Elevation: 17 m (56 ft)
- Highest elevation: 185 m (607 ft)
- Lowest elevation: 0 m (0 ft)

Population (2024 census)
  - Total: 29,372
  - Density: 529.3/km^{2} (1,371/sq mi)
  - Households: 7,346

Economy
  - Income class: 1st municipal income class
  - Poverty incidence: 4.4% (2023)
  - Revenue: ₱ 379.2 million (2024)
  - Assets: ₱ 1,288 million (2024)
  - Expenditure: ₱ 237 million (2024)
  - Liabilities: ₱ 46.12 million (2024)

Service provider
  - Electricity: Ilocos Sur Electric Cooperative (ISECO)
- Time zone: UTC+8 (PST)
- ZIP code: 2729
- PSGC: 0102928000
- IDD : area code: +63 (0)77
- Native languages: Ilocano; Tagalog
- Website: www.stodomingo-ilocossur.gov.ph

Santo Domingo, officially the Municipality of Santo Domingo (Ilocano: Ili ti Santo Domingo; Filipino: Bayan ng Santo Domingo), is a municipality in the province of Ilocos Sur, Philippines. According to the 2024 census, it has a population of 29,372 people.

== Etymology ==
The name of the municipality came from its old moniker, "Paggappuan ti Santol iti Domingo," an Ilocano term meaning "The source of the Santol sold every Sunday." Santol (Sandoricum koetjape) is the name of the tree bearing round, yellowish fruits growing in abundance in the municipality, notably in Barangay Pussuac.

== History ==
During the Spanish era, an enlisted man of the Spanish Civil Guard, Pablo Arquero, looked for the source of the santol being sold in the markets of Ciudad Fernandina (now Vigan) on Sundays during the months of June to August. To do so, he asked for a leave of absence from his platoon leader to trace the source of the fruits. With his Ilocano guide, he searched the lands north of Villa Fernandina. He found nothing in the neighboring towns of Bantay, Santa Catalina, San Vicente, and Bantaoay (now San Ildefonso). He finally found many santol-bearing trees in a place north of Bantaoay now called Barangay Pussuac. He has found the "Paggappuan ti Santol ti Domingo." The town was named Santo Domingo on account of this feat.

Don Pablo Arquero is claimed to have founded the municipality on May 12, 1742, with Father Tomas Millan as the first parish priest. Father Millan laid the foundation of the belfry, where the great Filipino hero Diego Silang once worked as a boy. The 1818 Spanish census showed Santo Domingo had 2,942 native families co-progressing with 86 Spanish-Filipino families.

In 2010, the University of Northern Philippines opened a campus in Quimmarayan. It houses the university's agricultural, fishery and research courses; and the Environmental Research and Training Center.

== Geography ==
Santo Domingo is situated 8.56 kilometres (5.32 mi) from the provincial capital Vigan, and 409.49 kilometres (254.45 mi) from the country's capital city of Manila.

=== Barangays ===
Santo Domingo is politically subdivided into 36 barangays. Each barangay consists of puroks and some have sitios.

- Binalayangan
- Binongan
- Borobor
- Cabaritan
- Cabigbigaan
- Calautit
- Calay-ab
- Camestizoan
- Casili
- Flora
- Lagatit
- Laoingen
- Lussoc
- Nagbettedan
- Naglaoa-an
- Nalasin
- Nambaran
- Nanerman
- Napo
- Padu Chico
- Padu Grande
- Paguraper
- Panay
- Pangpangdan
- Parada
- Paras
- Poblacion
- Puerta Real
- Pussuac
- Quimmarayan
- San Pablo
- Santa Cruz
- Santo Tomas
- Sived
- Suksukit
- Vacunero

=== Climate ===
Climate data for Santo Domingo, Ilocos Sur
Month	Jan	Feb	Mar	Apr	May	Jun	Jul	Aug	Sep	Oct	Nov	Dec	Year
Mean daily maximum °C (°F)	30 (86)	31 (88)	33 (91)	34 (93)	33 (91)	31 (88)	30 (86)	30 (86)	30 (86)	31 (88)	30 (86)	29 (84)	31 (88)
Mean daily minimum °C (°F)	19 (66)	19 (66)	21 (70)	23 (73)	24 (75)	25 (77)	24 (75)	24 (75)	24 (75)	22 (72)	21 (70)	19 (66)	22 (72)
Average precipitation mm (inches)	9 (0.4)	11 (0.4)	13 (0.5)	23 (0.9)	92 (3.6)	122 (4.8)	153 (6.0)	137 (5.4)	139 (5.5)	141 (5.6)	42 (1.7)	14 (0.6)	896 (35.4)
Average rainy days	4.6	4.0	6.2	9.1	19.5	23.2	24.0	22.5	21.5	15.2	10.5	6.0	166.3
Source: Meteoblue (modeled/calculated data, not measured locally)

== Demographics ==
Population census of Santo Domingo

Year	Pop.	±% p.a.
1903	10,075	—
1918	13,018	+1.72%
1939	10,856	−0.86%
1948	11,082	+0.23%
1960	13,685	+1.77%
1970	14,980	+0.91%

Year	Pop.	±% p.a.
1975	15,957	+1.28%
1980	17,728	+2.13%
1990	20,720	+1.57%
1995	22,727	+1.75%
2000	24,520	+1.64%
2007	25,888	+0.75%

Year	Pop.	±% p.a.
2010	27,596	+2.35%
2015	27,975	+0.26%
2020	29,041	+0.79%
2024	29,372	+0.27%

Source: Philippine Statistics Authority

In the 2024 census, Santo Domingo had a population of 29,372 people. The population density was 530 inhabitants per square kilometre (1,400/sq mi).

== Economy ==
Poverty incidence of Santo Domingo (%)

Source: Philippine Statistics Authority

== Government ==
=== Local government ===
Santo Domingo, belonging to the first congressional district of the province of Ilocos Sur, is governed by a mayor designated as its local chief executive and by a municipal council as its legislative body in accordance with the Local Government Code. The mayor, vice mayor, and the councilors are elected directly by the people through an election which is being held every three years.

=== Elected officials ===
Members of the Municipal Council (2025–Present)
Position	Name
Congressman	Ronald V. Singson
Mayor	Annea Cassandra Singson De Leon
Vice-Mayor	Felix Ingan
Councilors	Luciano Manuel
Councilors	Mark Denver Alvarado
Councilors	Benedict Singin De Vera II
Councilors	Jane De Vera-Martinez
Councilors	Michael Emili Villanueva Figueras
Councilors	Giovanni Velasco
Councilors	Rizaldy Rosario

=== List of local chief executives ===
For 378 years, from 1521 to 1899, Local Chief Executives of the “pueblos” or town were appointed by the Spaniards and in the year 1901 up to 1946 they were appointed by Americans. Afterwards, election was the mode of selection.

Gobernadorcillos (1742-1892):

- Don Pablo Arquero
- Don Lucas Pulano
- Don Jose Alfonso
- Don Miguel Palomar
- Don Antonio Arce
- Don Francisco Quismundo
- Don Jose Molina
- Don Agustin Dela Vega
- Don Agustin Soliven
- Don Jose Florentino
- Don Juan Sumabat
- Don Juan de Castillo
- Don Sebastian Arce
- Don Policarpio Tobias
- Don Nicolas Molina
- Sebastian Bumatay
- Nicolas Palomar
- Antionio Molina
- Jacinto del Castillo
- Vicente Arce
- Mariano dela Vega
- Felipe Sumabat
- Quinterio Palomar
- Pedro Nicolas Jose
- Fruto Evaristo Salvador
- Manuel Peria
- Fructoso Palomar
- Pablo Gonzales Arce
- Manuel Bumatay
- Victor Briones
- Gregorio Molina
- Santiago Salvio
- Ambrocio dela Vega
- Eulogio Herminigildo
- Pablo Paulino Torres
- Serapio dela Cruz
- Valentine de Jesus
- Jose Palomar
- Anastacio Florentino
- Pedro Jacinto Tesoro
- Pedro Tobias
- Rodencindo dela Vega
- Remegio Tesoro Sebastian
- Valentin de Jesus Tesoro
- Herminigildo Palomar
- Hilario Baumatay
- Nicolas Briones
- Eleuterio Torres
- Pedro Alcantara
- Valentin Sebastian
- Cristobal Soliver
- Pedro Bumatay
- Gabino Bumatay
- Tomas Jacinto Tesoro
- Felix Sumabat
- Manuel Dela Vega
- Clemente Bumatay
- Camilo Tugade
- Mariano De Jesus
- Felix Eugenio Temporal
- Juan Carpio
- Enrique Arce
- Luis Palomar
- Arcadio Figueras
- Tranquilino Torre Victor
- Andres Villaflor De Jesus
- Apolonio Tobias
- Rafael Soliven
- Gregorio Tesoro Sebastian
- Bernabe Torre Victor
- Leon del Castillo
- Pedro Flotildes Rosario
- Bonifacio Figueras
- Ponciano Toarroja
- Eustaquio Tesoro Vega
- Doroteo Tobias
- Juan Figueras
- Balbino dela Vega
- Rafael Pizarro
- Joaquin Villafuerte
- Andres Tesoro Guillen
- Rufino Pinom Calestino
- Januario Celestino

Capitan Municipal (1893-1899):

- Don Wenceslao Soliven
- Don Isabelo Soliven

Presidentes Municipal:

- Don Aniceto Avila (1899-1900)
- Don Jacob Tesoro (1901-1902)
- Don Wenceslao Soliven (1903-1904)
- Don Catalino Villaflor (1905-1906)
- Don Rufino Tobias (1907-1908)
- Don Isidro Villafuerte (1909-1910)
- Don Januario Tobias (1911-1915)
- Don Felipe Tugade (1916-1918)
- Don Alfonso Aranillo (1919-1921)
- Don Vicente Tacderas (1922-1930)
- Don Teodoro Tabangcura (1931-1932)

Municipal Mayors:

- Jose J. Tesoro (1933-1937)
- Cirilo Rabanal (1938-1941)
- Amante Soliven (1941-1942)
- Rufino Soliven (1943-1944)
- Faustino Tobia (1944-1945)
- Faustino Tamargo (1945-1946)
- Juan Quines (1946-1947)
- Filomeno Tadena (1948-1962)
- Jose Tinaza (1962-1963)
- Benjamin Sanidad (1964-1975)
- Orlino Tesoro (1975-1986)
- Susante J. Tobias (Oct. 13, 1986-Dec. 1, 1987)
- Nelson T. Torices (Dec. 3, 1987-Feb. 2, 1988)
- Miguel Figueras JR. (1988-1997)
- Alfred Figueras (1998-2001)
- Floro Tadena (2001-2010)
- Amado Tadena (2010-2019)
- Floro Tadena (2019-2020)
- Bryan Dexter Tadena (2020-2025)
- Annea Cassandra Singson De Leon (2025-Present)

== Education ==
The Sto. Domingo-San Ildefonso Schools District Office governs all educational institutions within the municipality. They also oversee the operations of all private and public elementary and high schools located in San Ildefonso, Ilocos Sur.

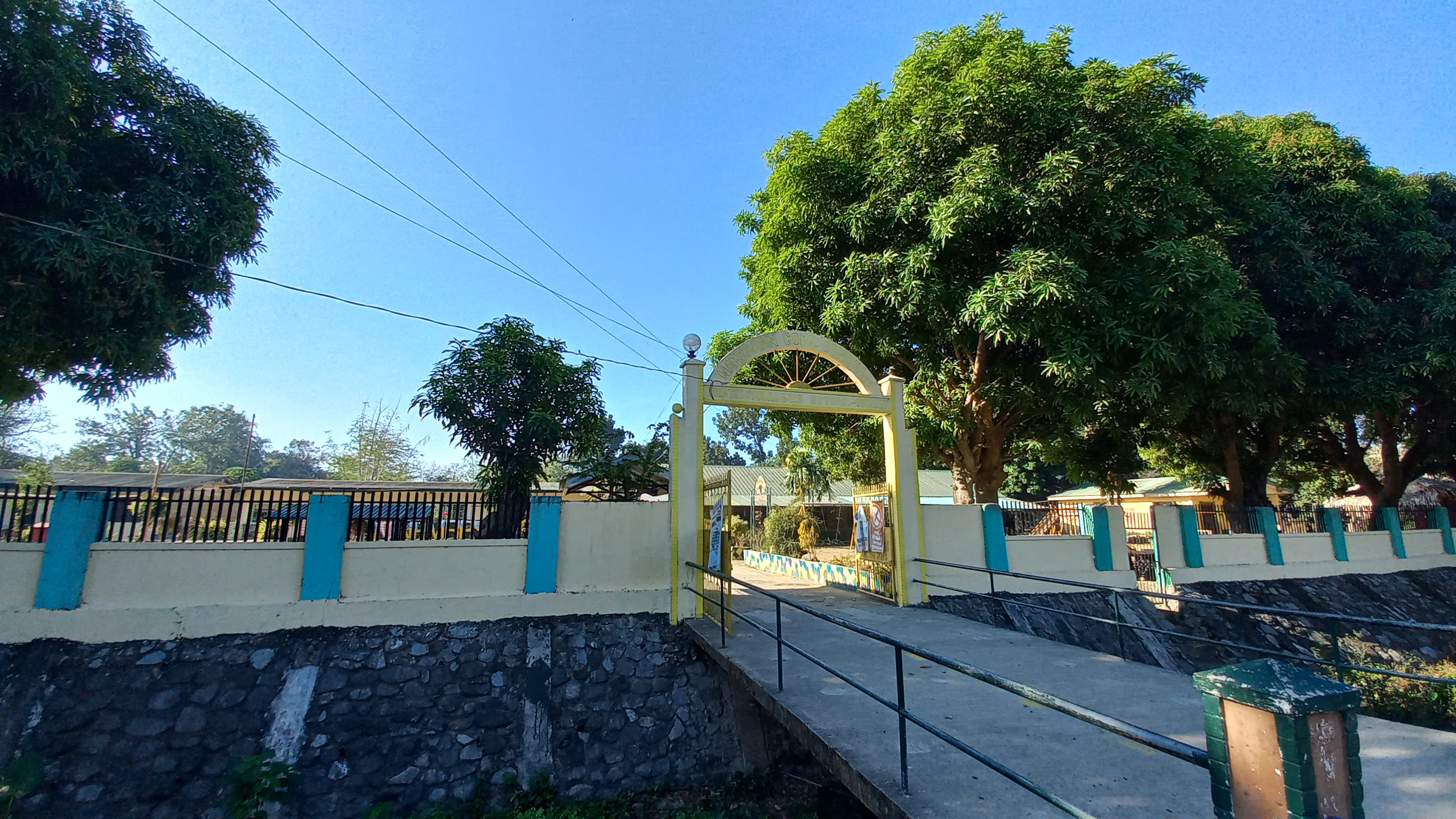
Nambaran Community School

=== Primary and elementary schools ===
- Binalayangan Elementary School
- Cirilo Rabanal Elementary School
- Cabaritan Elementary School
- Cabigbigaan Elementary School
- Calay-ab Elementary School
- Flora Elementary School
- Lagatit Elementary School
- Lao-ingen Elementary School
- Lussoc Community School
- Nagbettedan Elementary School
- Naglaoa-an Elementary School
- Nagtupacan Elementary School
- Nambaran Community School
- Padu Chico Elementary School
- Paras-Parada Elementary School
- Quimmarayan Elementary School
- Sived Elementary School
- Sto. Domingo North Central School
- Sto. Domingo South Central School
- Sto. Tomas Elementary School

=== Secondary schools ===
- Benito Soliven Academy
- Lussoc National High School
- Naglaoa-an National High School
