= Santa Catalina, Ilocos Sur =

Municipality in Ilocos Sur, Philippines

Santa Catalina Santa Catalina Virgen y Martir
- Municipality
- Municipality of Santa Catalina
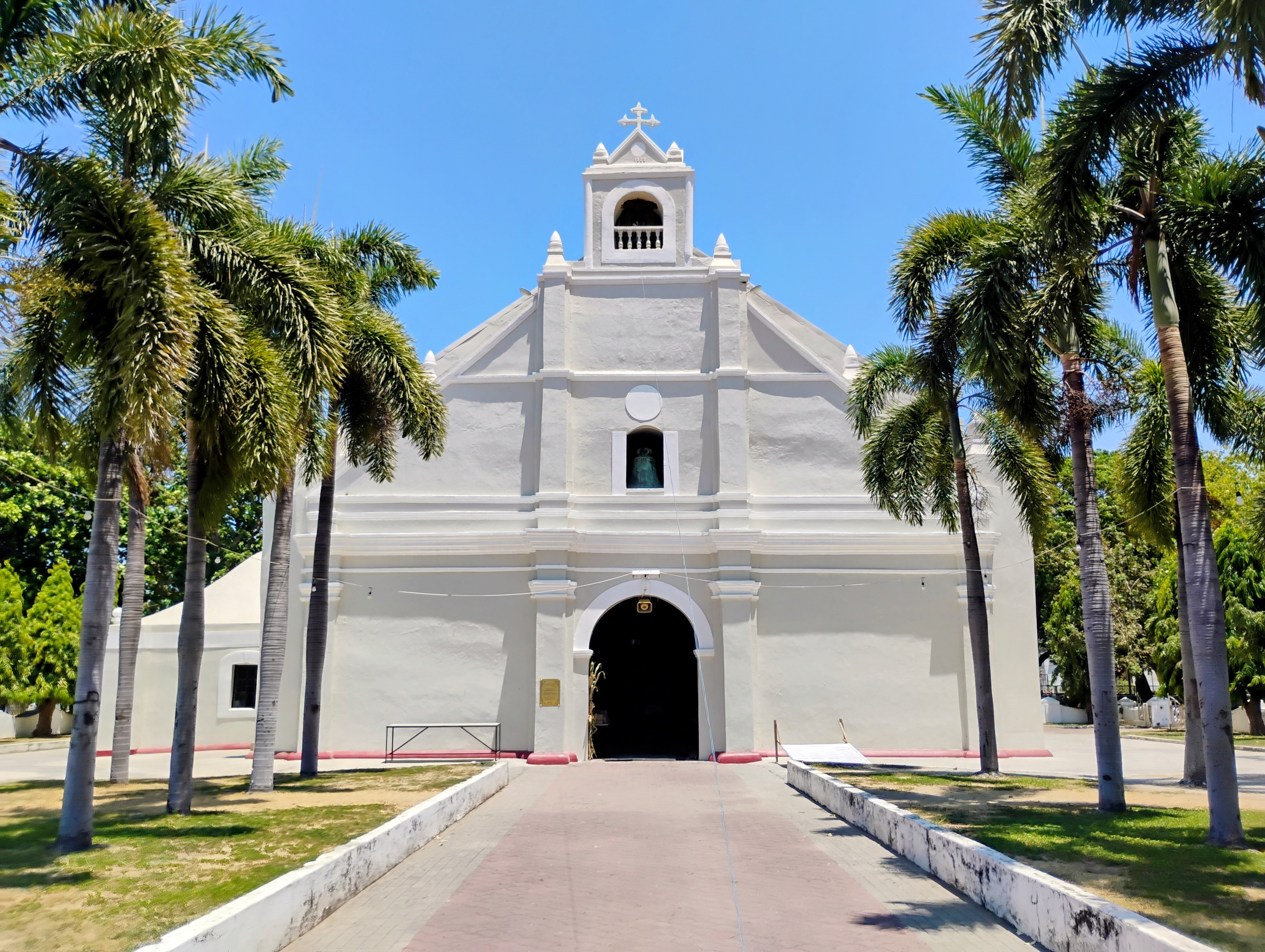
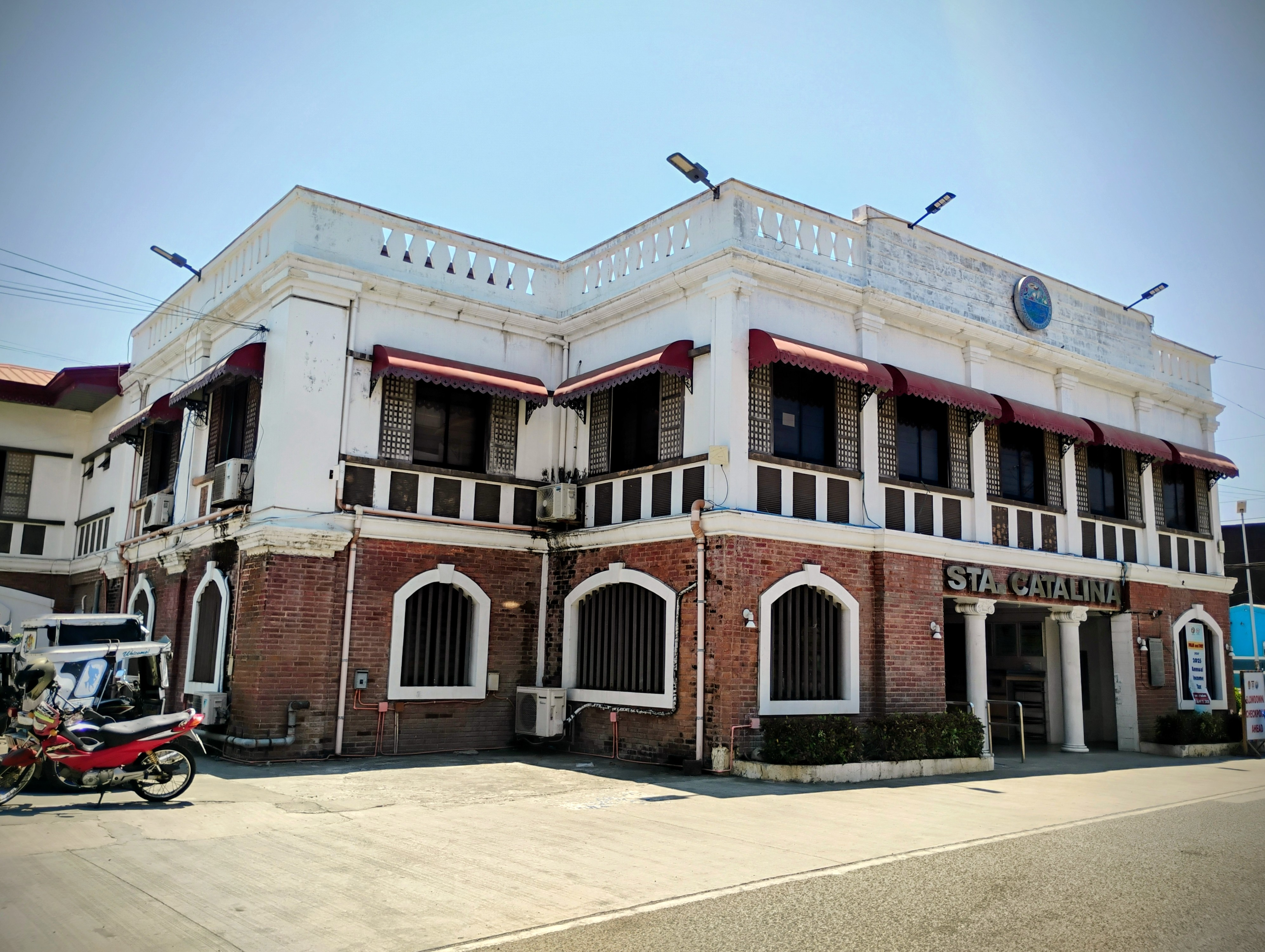
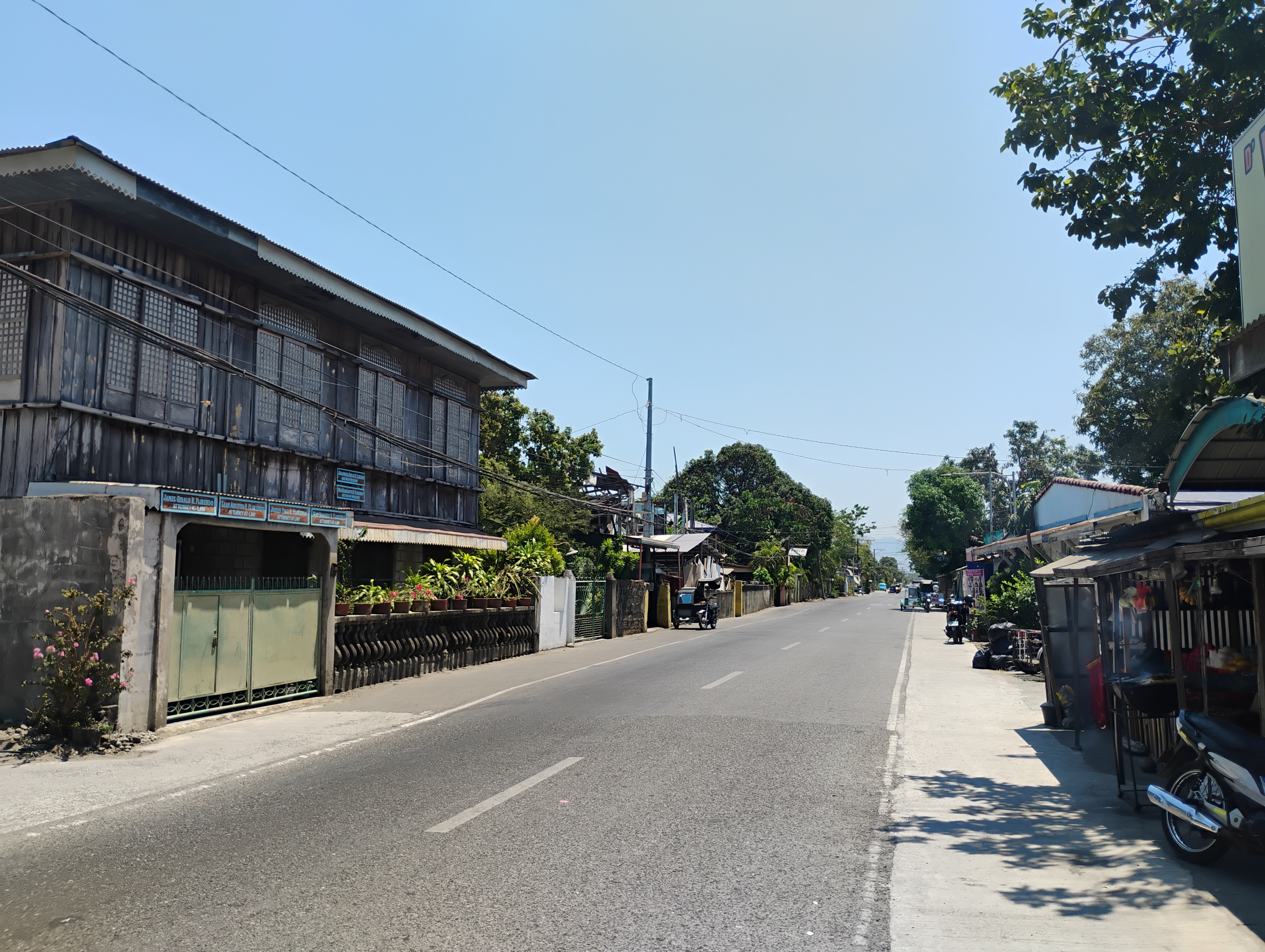
- St. Catherine of Alexandria Parish Church Santa Catalina Municipal Hall Santa Catalina Town Proper

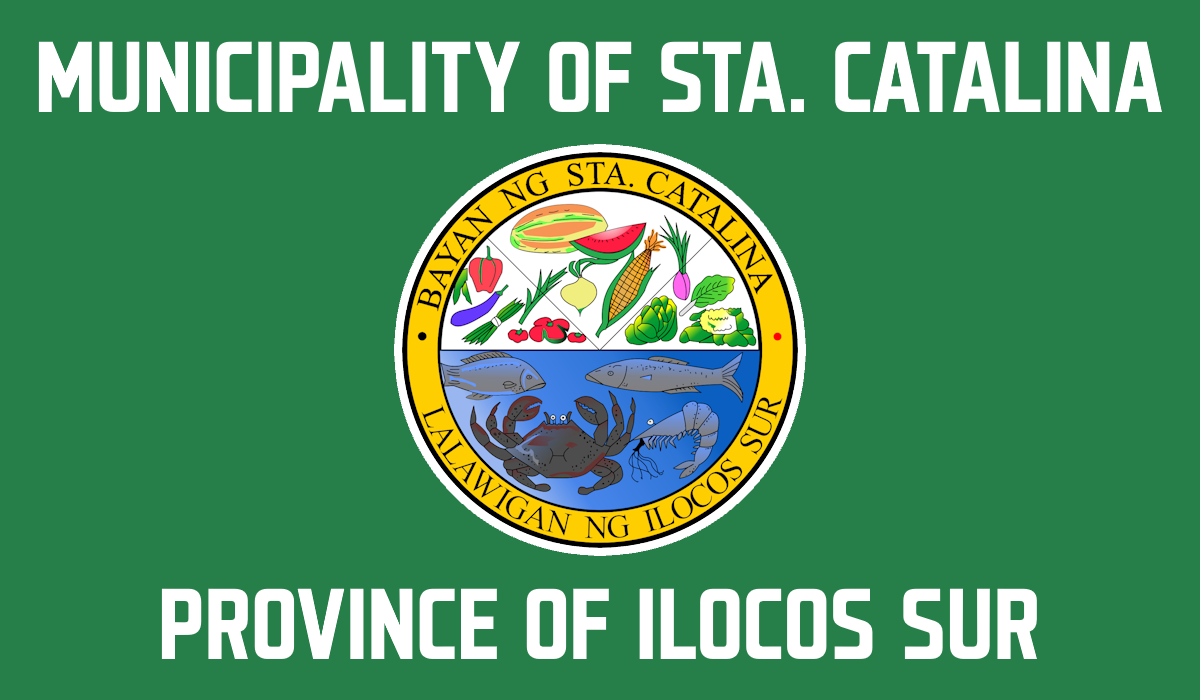
- Flag Seal
- Nickname: Vegetable Bowl of the North
- Motto: Larga Santa Catalina
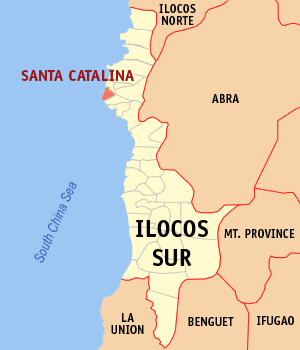
- Map of Ilocos Sur with Santa Catalina highlighted
- Interactive map of Santa Catalina
- Location within the Philippines
- Coordinates: 17°35′30″N 120°21′52″E
- Country: Philippines
- Region: Ilocos Region
- Province: Ilocos Sur
- District: 1st district
- Named for: St. Catherine of Alexandria
- Barangays: 9 (see Barangays)

Government
  - Type: Sangguniang Bayan
  - Mayor: Edgar R. Rapanut
  - Vice Mayor: Niño Rabena Realin
  - Representative: Deogracias Victor B. Savellano
  - Municipal Council: Members: Restituto R. Oandasan; Expedito R. Rapanut; Niño R. Realin; Rowena R. Racadio; Angelie Victoria R. Ragasa; Donato R. Ragasa; Conrado A. Ragucos; Merlito R. Rapacon
  - Electorate: 11,320 voters (2025)

Area
  - Total: 9.68 km^{2} (3.74 sq mi)
- Elevation: 5.0 m (16.4 ft)
- Highest elevation: 44 m (144 ft)
- Lowest elevation: 0 m (0 ft)

Population (2024 census)
  - Total: 14,319
  - Density: 1,480/km^{2} (3,830/sq mi)
  - Households: 3,321

Economy
  - Income class: 2nd municipal income class
  - Poverty incidence: 4.15% (2023)
  - Revenue: ₱ 219.3 million (2024)
  - Assets: ₱ 625.1 million (2024)
  - Expenditure: ₱ 138.2 million (2024)
  - Liabilities: ₱ 57.25 million (2024)

Service provider
  - Electricity: Ilocos Sur Electric Cooperative (ISECO)
- Time zone: UTC+8 (PST)
- ZIP code: 2701
- PSGC: 0102923000
- IDD : area code: +63 (0)77
- Native languages: Ilocano; Tagalog

Santa Catalina, officially the Municipality of Santa Catalina (Ilocano: Ili ti Santa Catalina; Filipino: Bayan ng Santa Catalina), is a municipality in the province of Ilocos Sur, Philippines. According to the 2024 census, it has a population of 14,319 people.

A feast is held in the municipality every 25th day of November to celebrate the Feast of Saint Catherine of Alexandria (the town's patron saint).

== Etymology ==
When the Augustinians were Christianizing the Ilocos Region, a group of missionaries sailed westward through the river known as "El Mestizo" to the place now called Santa Catalina. After they landed in the region, they went looking for fresh water. When they finally found a freshwater spring up north, they took to drinking.

Supposedly, near the water, some of them saw an image of a beautiful lady, which disappeared after a few minutes. One of them recognized the image as that of Saint Catherine of Alexandria. The Augustinians returned to Villa Fernandina (Vigan) and reported this matter to their superiors. This resulted in the construction of a church in the town, with Saint Catherine of Alexandria as the patron saint. It was also declared that the town would be named Santa Catalina in her honor.

A replica of the cross once planted by Salcedo and his party—to signify that the Spanish had conquered the area—stands near the entrance to the municipality.

== Geography ==
Aerial view of Santa Catalina, undated (probably early 20th century)

With an area of 968 hectares (2,390 acres), it is the smallest municipality in the province and the only municipality in Ilocos Sur which has an urban status for all its barangays based on National Statistical Coordination Board (NSCB).

Santa Catalina is situated 3.33 kilometres (2.07 mi) from the provincial capital Vigan, and 406.44 kilometres (252.55 mi) from the country's capital city of Manila.

=== Barangays ===
Santa Catalina is politically subdivided into 9 barangays. Each barangay consists of puroks and some have sitios.

- Cabaroan
- Cabittaogan
- Cabuloan
- Pangada
- Paratong
- Poblacion
- Sinabaan
- Subec
- Tamorong

It has 3 sitios, namely:

- Calawaan in barangay Tamorong
- Mindanao, formerly Sabangan in barangay Paratong
- Punta in barangay Cabittaogan

=== Climate ===
Climate data for Santa Catalina, Ilocos Sur
Month	Jan	Feb	Mar	Apr	May	Jun	Jul	Aug	Sep	Oct	Nov	Dec	Year
Mean daily maximum °C (°F)	30 (86)	31 (88)	33 (91)	34 (93)	33 (91)	31 (88)	30 (86)	30 (86)	30 (86)	31 (88)	30 (86)	29 (84)	31 (88)
Mean daily minimum °C (°F)	19 (66)	19 (66)	21 (70)	23 (73)	25 (77)	25 (77)	24 (75)	24 (75)	24 (75)	22 (72)	21 (70)	19 (66)	22 (72)
Average precipitation mm (inches)	9 (0.4)	11 (0.4)	13 (0.5)	23 (0.9)	92 (3.6)	122 (4.8)	153 (6.0)	137 (5.4)	139 (5.5)	141 (5.6)	42 (1.7)	14 (0.6)	896 (35.4)
Average rainy days	4.6	4.0	6.2	9.1	19.5	23.2	24.0	22.5	21.5	15.2	10.5	6.0	166.3
Source: Meteoblue (modeled/calculated data, not measured locally)

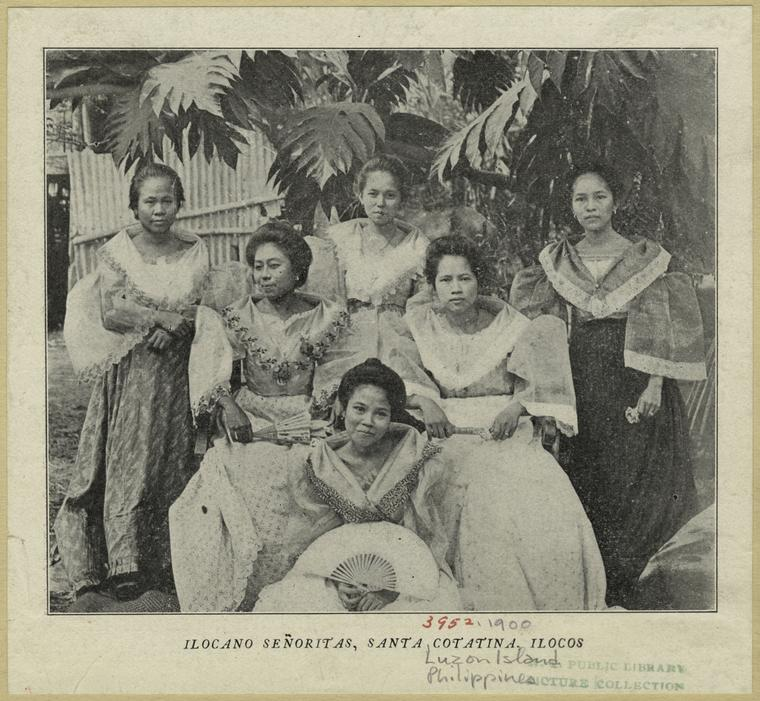
Ilocano señoritas from Santa Catalina, ca. 1900s

== Demographics ==
Population census of Santa Catalina

Year	Pop.	±% p.a.
1903	5,625	—
1918	6,494	+0.96%
1939	6,495	+0.00%
1948	7,125	+1.03%
1960	8,414	+1.40%
1970	8,921	+0.59%

Year	Pop.	±% p.a.
1975	9,391	+1.04%
1980	9,761	+0.78%
1990	11,388	+1.55%
1995	11,228	−0.26%
2000	12,537	+2.39%
2007	13,284	+0.80%

Year	Pop.	±% p.a.
2010	13,597	+0.85%
2015	13,945	+0.48%
2020	14,493	+0.81%
2024	14,319	−0.29%

Source: Philippine Statistics Authority

In the 2024 census, Santa Catalina had a population of 14,319 people. The population density was 1,500 inhabitants per square kilometre (3,900/sq mi).

== Economy ==
Poverty incidence of Santa Catalina (%)

Source: Philippine Statistics Authority

As of February 2006, Santa Catalina with a poverty incidence of 7.9 percent and Vigan City with a poverty incidence of 8.6 percent, are the top two municipalities/cities with lowest poverty incidents in Ilocos Sur, and for the entire northern Luzon. This is among the results of the Poverty Mapping Project implemented by the National Statistical Coordination Board (NSCB) with funding assistance from the World Bank ASEM Trust Fund in response to the increasing demand for local level poverty estimates.

=== Trade ===
The main source of income for the locals include farming, fishing, and small-scale businesses. As with most Philippine towns, the phenomenon of migrant labor has also contributed much to the development of the town. It is evidenced by the numerous mansions and large houses that dot the area, along with the vast expanse of active farms and fields. Santa Catalina is only four (4) kilometers away from Vigan City, which is the province's center of commerce and trade. Santa Catalina has yet to establish a Central Business District (CBD). Residents currently go to Vigan to sell their produce and at the same time buy their household needs and other goods and merchandise that will be retailed in the locality.

=== Light Industries ===
Santa Catalina also has manufacturing of concrete well rings-a material used as reservoir in the making of open-dug wells to irrigate farm lots. There are also service-oriented industries such as gravel and sand businesses that cater to the needs of the Housing Sector and the metal crafts that manufacture sidecars for motorized-tricycles. These industries do have limited employment. One pioneering industry in the locality is the manufacture of Cigars but this industry is already nearing its extinction because of lack of the raw materials (native tobacco) that were used in the manufacture. We do have also the Onion Dehydration Plant an industry that pulverized onion that was exported in different Asian countries. The reason why this dehydrating plant had closed was because of dollar fluctuations.

=== Agriculture ===
A total of 696.5888 hectares or 74.581% of the total land area of Santa Catalina is utilized for crop production. Barangays usually have croplands near them. The whole area of 696.588 hectares is planted with rice during rainy season. 30 hectares or 4.31 percent of the total agricultural land is planted with white corn while 20 hectares or 2.87 percent are planted with corn. Next to rice/corn season, farmers also plant vegetables with a total effective area of 1,150 hectares or 165.09 percent of the agricultural lands. Onions, cabbage, cauliflower, sweet pepper, eggplant, beans, tomato, sweet potato, yam beans, mongo and peanut are the vegetables that are planted. Because of the limited agricultural land in the municipality, inter cropping farming system are commonly practiced. As had been mentioned earlier that 696.588 hectares are planted with rice and corn while 1,150 hectares are planted with vegetable. This municipality has been known as the “VEGETABLE BOWL OF THE NORTH”. The total value of vegetable production alone is PhP 523.04 million that brings a lot of income to farmers.

=== Poultry, Livestock and Fisheries ===
The farmers in the locality do not produce livestock or poultry in commercial scale but mostly on the backyard level. Livestock such as cows and water buffalo were being raised to help farmers in their farm needs and serves as working animal. Likewise, goats were raised but not in herds and these are for local and home consumption of the farmers. Farmers do not raise poultry in commercial scale, but they raised chickens in backyard scale. Most farmers raised fighting cocks which commands higher prices in the market. The total area for fishponds is 53.9021 hectares. These fishponds are almost located in every barangay, but the biggest area is at barangay Cabittaogan. Fishponds are classified as a) brackish pond where milkfish are cultured, b) freshwater for the production of tilapia, c) fish cages, d) Municipal fishing grounds which were found within 15 kilometers from the shoreline of coastal barangay and e) communal fishing grounds found in Govantes River.

== Government ==
=== Local government ===
Santa Catalina, belonging to the first congressional district of the province of Ilocos Sur, is governed by a mayor designated as its local chief executive and by a municipal council as its legislative body in accordance with the Local Government Code. The mayor, vice mayor, and the councilors are elected directly by the people through an election which is being held every three years.

=== Elected officials ===
Members of the Municipal Council (2019–2022)
Position	Name
Congressman	Deogracias Victor B. Savellano
Mayor	Edgar R. Rapanut
Vice-Mayor	Jonathan Amando R. Redoble
Councilors	Restituto R. Oandasan
Councilors	Expedito R. Rapanut
Councilors	Niño R. Realin
Councilors	Rowena R. Racadio
Councilors	Angelie Victoria R. Ragasa
Councilors	Donato R. Ragasa
Councilors	Conrado A. Ragucos
Councilors	Merlito R. Rapacon

== Education ==
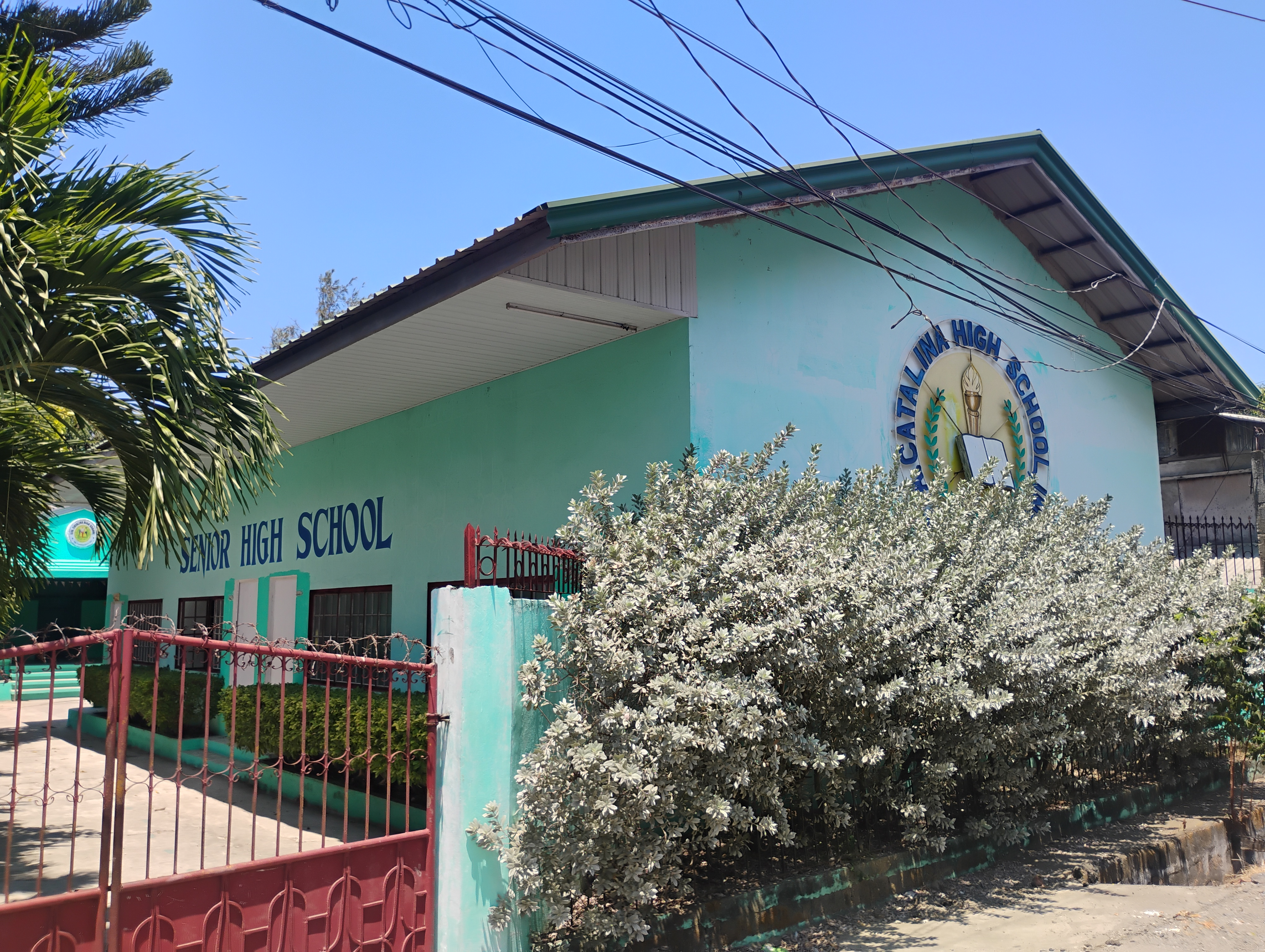
Sta. Catalina High School, Inc.

The Santa Catalina Schools District Office governs all educational institutions situated within the municipality.

=== Primary and secondary schools ===
- Bernardo P. Ragasa Elementary School
- Cabittaogan Elementary School
- Cabuloan Elementary School
- Calawaan Elementary School
- Pangada-Cabaroan Integrated School (Former Elementary)
- Paratong Elementary School
- Santa Catalina Central School

=== Secondary schools ===
- Cabittaogan High School
- Santa Catalina High School (formerly known as Benito Soliven Institute).

== Sister cities ==
- Makati, Philippines
