= 2022 Ilocos Sur local elections =

- Registered: 476,984
- Turnout: 424,113
- 2022 Ilocos Sur gubernatorial election
← 2019	May 9, 2022	2025 →
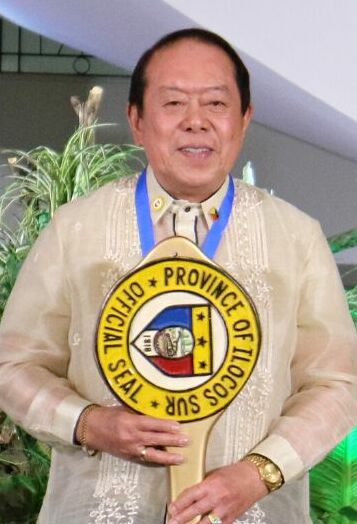
Candidate	Jerry Singson
Party	NPC
Running mate	Ryan Luis Singson
Popular vote	313,620
Percentage	100.00
Governor before election
Ryan Luis Singson
Bileg
Elected Governor
Jerry Singson
NPC
- 2022 Ilocos Sur vice gubernatorial election
← 2019	May 9, 2022	2025 →
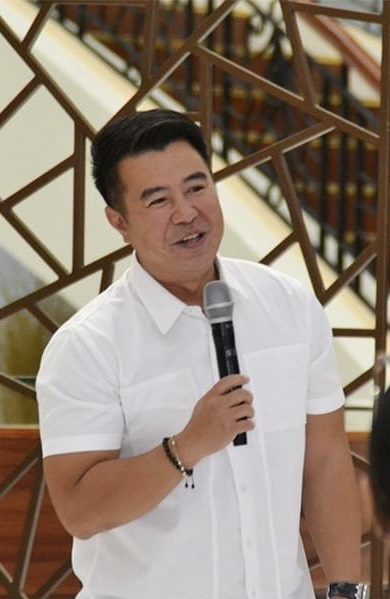
Candidate	Ryan Luis Singson
Party	Bileg
Popular vote	326,228
Percentage	100.00
Vice-Governor before election
Jerry Singson
Bileg
Elected Vice-Governor
Ryan Luis Singson
Bileg

Local elections were held in Ilocos Sur on May 9, 2022, as part of the 2022 Philippine general election. Voters will select candidates for all local positions: a town mayor, vice mayor, and town councilors, as well as members of the Sangguniang Panlalawigan, a vice-governor, a governor, and representatives for the province's two congressional districts in the Philippine House of Representatives.

== Provincial elections ==
=== Governor ===
Ilocos Sur Gubernatorial Election
Party	Candidate	Votes	%
NPC	Jerry Singson	313,620	100.00
Total votes		313,620	100.00
NPC gain from Bileg			

==== Per City/Municipality ====
City/Municipality	Jerry Singson	
City/Municipality	Votes	%
Alilem	3,591	100.00
Banayoyo	3,942	100.00
Bantay	14,760	100.00
Burgos	6,180	100.00
Cabugao	15,458	100.00
Candon	26,805	100.00
Caoayan	9,974	100.00
Cervantes	7,576	100.00
Galimuyod	5,496	100.00
Gregorio del Pilar	2,126	100.00
Lidlidda	2,499	100.00
Magsingal	12,838	100.00
Nagbukel	3,052	100.00
Narvacan	20,394	100.00
Quirino	4,503	100.00
Salcedo	5,753	100.00
San Emilio	3,680	100.00
San Esteban	4,372	100.00
San Ildefonso	3,667	100.00
San Juan	12,538	100.00
San Vicente	6,422	100.00
Santa	7,006	100.00
Santa Catalina	6,597	100.00
Santa Cruz	17,076	100.00
Santa Lucia	11,266	100.00
Santa Maria	13,439	100.00
Santiago	7,512	100.00
Santo Domingo	12,504	100.00
Sigay	1,318	100.00
Sinait	13,212	100.00
Sugpon	1,932	100.00
Suyo	5,252	100.00
Tagudin	16,556	100.00
Vigan	23,936	100.00
Total	313,620	100.00

=== Vice Governor ===
Ilocos Sur Vice Gubernatorial Election
Party	Candidate	Votes	%
Bileg	Ryan Luis Singson	326,228	100.00
Total votes		326,228	100.00
Bileg hold			

==== Per City/Municipality ====
City/Municipality	Ryan Luis Singson	
City/Municipality	Votes	%
Alilem	3,619	100.00
Banayoyo	4,009	100.00
Bantay	15,292	100.00
Burgos	6,309	100.00
Cabugao	18,157	100.00
Candon	27,366	100.00
Caoayan	10,426	100.00
Cervantes	7,671	100.00
Galimuyod	5,609	100.00
Gregorio del Pilar	2,161	100.00
Lidlidda	2,528	100.00
Magsingal	13,646	100.00
Nagbukel	3,081	100.00
Narvacan	21,412	100.00
Quirino	4,536	100.00
Salcedo	5,762	100.00
San Emilio	3,707	100.00
San Esteban	4,510	100.00
San Ildefonso	3,823	100.00
San Juan	13,109	100.00
San Vicente	6,552	100.00
Santa	7,194	100.00
Santa Catalina	6,937	100.00
Santa Cruz	17,729	100.00
Santa Lucia	11,740	100.00
Santa Maria	14,059	100.00
Santiago	7,925	100.00
Santo Domingo	13,035	100.00
Sigay	1,322	100.00
Sinait	13,834	100.00
Sugpon	1,972	100.00
Suyo	5,284	100.00
Tagudin	16,905	100.00
Vigan	24,586	100.00
Total	326,228	100.00

== Congressional elections ==
=== Congressional districts ===
==== 1st District ====
Philippine House of Representatives Election at Ilocos Sur's 1st District
Party	Candidate	Votes	%
NPC	Ronald Singson	99,376	57.48
Nacionalista	DV Savellano	73,503	42.51
Total votes		172,879	100.00
NPC gain from Nacionalista			

==== 2nd District ====
Philippine House of Representatives Election at Ilocos Sur's 2nd District
Party	Candidate	Votes	%
NPC	Kristine Singson-Meehan	180,953	100.00
Total votes		180,953	100.00
NPC hold			

== Provincial Board elections ==
=== Provincial Board ===
Party	Votes	%	Seats
Nationalist People's Coalition	702,759	61.95	6
Bileg Ti Ilokano	263,321	23.21	3
Kilusang Bagong Lipunan	103,598	9.13	1
Independent	64,649	5.70	–
Ex officio seats			3
Reserved seat			1
Total	1,134,327	100.00	14

==== 1st District ====
Ilocos Sur Provincial Board Election at Ilocos Sur's 1st District
Party	Candidate	Votes	%
KBL	Rambo Rafanan	103,598	20.41
Bileg	Ronnie Rapanut	94,555	18.63
Bileg	Topeng Baterina	84,846	16.71
Bileg	Doc Art Oandasan	83,920	16.53
NPC	Third Ranches	74,117	14.60
NPC	JG De Leon	66,420	13.08
Total votes		507,456	99.96

==== 2nd District ====
Ilocos Sur Provincial Board Election at Ilocos Sur's 2nd District
Party	Candidate	Votes	%
NPC	Ericson Singson	145,525	23.21
NPC	Ben Maggay	110,760	17.66
NPC	Gina Cordero	110,089	17.56
NPC	Boy Gironella	99,390	15.85
NPC	Mildred Elaydo	96,458	15.38
Independent	Juan Abaya Jr.	64,649	10.31
Total votes		626,871	99.97
