= 2025 Philippine local elections in the Ilocos Region =

- May 12, 2025
- Gubernatorial elections
- 4 provincial governors and 1 city mayor
Party	Seats	+/–
Nacionalista	2	0
PFP	2	New
Bileg	1	New
This lists parties that won seats. See the complete results below.
- Vice gubernatorial elections
- 4 provincial vice governors and 1 city vice mayor
Party	Seats	+/–
Lakas	2	+1
Bileg	1	0
Nacionalista	1	0
PFP	1	New
This lists parties that won seats. See the complete results below.
- Provincial Board elections
- 42 provincial board members and 10 city councilors
Party	Seats	+/–
Nacionalista	15	−3
PFP	10	+9
Bileg	9	+6
Lakas	9	+7
Reporma	2	+2
API	1	−7
Liberal	1	0
NPC	1	−11
Independent	4	+3
This lists parties that won seats. See the complete results below.

The 2025 Philippine local elections in the Ilocos Region were held on May 12, 2025.

== Summary ==
=== Governors ===
Province/city	Incumbent	Incumbent's party	Winner	Winner's party	Winning margin
Dagupan (ICC)	Belen Fernandez	PFP	Belen Fernandez	PFP	32.04%
Ilocos Norte	Matthew Manotoc	Nacionalista	Cecilia Marcos	Nacionalista	91.00%
Ilocos Sur	Jerry Singson	Bileg	Jerry Singson	Bileg	Unopposed
La Union	Raphaelle Ortega-David	NPC	Mario Eduardo Ortega	PFP	20.94%
Pangasinan	Ramon Guico III	Nacionalista	Ramon Guico III	Nacionalista	5.82%

=== Vice governors ===
Province/city	Incumbent	Incumbent's party	Winner	Winner's party	Winning margin
Dagupan (ICC)	Bryan Kua	PFP	Bryan Kua	PFP	6.30%
Ilocos Norte	Cecilia Marcos	Nacionalista	Matthew Manotoc	Nacionalista	Unopposed
Ilocos Sur	Ryan Luis Singson	Bileg	Ryan Luis Singson	Bileg	Unopposed
La Union	Mario Eduardo Ortega	PFP	Eric Sibuma	Lakas	35.48%
Pangasinan	Mark Lambino	Lakas	Mark Lambino	Lakas	45.24%

=== Provincial boards ===
Province/city	Seats	Party control		Composition
Province/city	Seats	Previous	Result	Composition
Dagupan (ICC)	10 elected 2 ex-officio	Nacionalista	PFP	PFP (9); Nacionalista (1)
Ilocos Norte	10 elected 3 ex-officio	Nacionalista	Nacionalista	Nacionalista (7); Reporma (2); Independent (1)
Ilocos Sur	10 elected 4 ex-officio	No majority	Bileg	Bileg (9); PFP (1)
La Union	10 elected 3 ex-officio	No majority	Lakas	Lakas (8); Independent (2)
Pangasinan	12 elected 3 ex-officio	API	No majority	Nacionalista (7); API (1); NPC (1); Lakas (1); Liberal (1); Independent (1)

== Dagupan ==
=== Mayor ===
Incumbent Mayor Belen Fernandez of the Partido Federal ng Pilipinas ran for a second term. She was previously affiliated with Aksyon Demokratiko.

Fernandez won re-election against city councilor Celia Lim (Nacionalista Party).

Candidate	Party	Votes	%
Belen Fernandez (incumbent)	Partido Federal ng Pilipinas	81,977	66.02
Celia Lim	Nacionalista Party	42,200	33.98
Total		124,177	100.00
Valid votes		124,177	98.21
Invalid/blank votes		2,265	1.79
Total votes		126,442	100.00
Registered voters/turnout		144,481	87.51
PFP hold			
Source: Commission on Elections

=== Vice Mayor ===
Incumbent Vice Mayor Bryan Kua of the Partido Federal ng Pilipinas ran for a third term. He was previously affiliated with Aksyon Demokratiko.

Kua won re-election against former Dagupan mayor Brian Lim (Nacionalista Party).

Candidate	Party	Votes	%
Bryan Kua (incumbent)	Partido Federal ng Pilipinas	65,765	53.15
Brian Lim	Nacionalista Party	57,965	46.85
Total		123,730	100.00
Valid votes		123,730	97.86
Invalid/blank votes		2,712	2.14
Total votes		126,442	100.00
Registered voters/turnout		144,481	87.51
PFP hold			
Source: Commission on Elections

=== City Council ===
The Dagupan City Council is composed of 12 councilors, 10 of whom are elected.

23 candidates were included in the ballot.

The Partido Federal ng Pilipinas won nine seats, gaining a majority in the city council.

Party	Votes	%	Seats	+/–
Partido Federal ng Pilipinas	611,701	59.43	9	New
Nacionalista Party	401,498	39.01	1	–6
Independent	16,095	1.56	0	0
Total	1,029,294	100.00	10	0
Total votes	126,442	–		
Registered voters/turnout	144,481	87.51		
Source: Commission on Elections

Candidate	Party	Votes	%
Michael Fernandez (incumbent)	Partido Federal ng Pilipinas	72,462	7.04
Joey Tamayo	Partido Federal ng Pilipinas	65,957	6.41
Tala Paras	Partido Federal ng Pilipinas	63,228	6.14
Jigs Seen (incumbent)	Partido Federal ng Pilipinas	62,683	6.09
Karlos Reyna	Partido Federal ng Pilipinas	61,468	5.97
Danee Canto	Partido Federal ng Pilipinas	61,207	5.95
Chito Samson	Partido Federal ng Pilipinas	60,245	5.85
Marvin Fabia	Partido Federal ng Pilipinas	59,318	5.76
Jaja Cayabyab	Partido Federal ng Pilipinas	55,275	5.37
Dada Manaois Reyna (incumbent)	Nacionalista Party	52,516	5.10
Joshua Bugayong	Partido Federal ng Pilipinas	49,858	4.84
Alfie Fernandez (incumbent)	Nacionalista Party	48,043	4.67
Alvin Coquia (incumbent)	Nacionalista Party	46,905	4.56
Irene Lim Acosta (incumbent)	Nacionalista Party	45,647	4.43
Malou Fernandez (incumbent)	Nacionalista Party	44,798	4.35
Tope Lim Chua	Nacionalista Party	38,596	3.75
Red Erfe-Mejia (incumbent)	Nacionalista Party	37,737	3.67
Benedict Cayabyab	Nacionalista Party	33,494	3.25
Leo Cuaton	Nacionalista Party	31,556	3.07
Jek Palaganas	Nacionalista Party	22,206	2.16
Mackoy Vinluan	Independent	8,663	0.84
Apring Dawana	Independent	4,017	0.39
Manuel John Sia	Independent	3,415	0.33
Total		1,029,294	100.00
Total votes		126,442	–
Registered voters/turnout		144,481	87.51
Source: Commission on Elections

== Ilocos Norte ==
=== Governor ===
Incumbent Governor Matthew Manotoc of the Nacionalista Party initially ran for a third term, but withdrew on October 8, 2024, to run for vice governor of Ilocos Norte.

The Nacionalista Party substituted Manotoc with Ilocos Norte vice governor Cecilia Marcos, who won the election against Joy Butay (Independent).

Candidate	Party	Votes	%
Cecilia Marcos	Nacionalista Party	299,037	95.50
Joy Butay	Independent	14,089	4.50
Total		313,126	100.00
Valid votes		313,126	80.71
Invalid/blank votes		74,831	19.29
Total votes		387,957	100.00
Registered voters/turnout		436,087	88.96
Nacionalista hold			
Source: Commission on Elections

=== Vice Governor ===
Incumbent Vice Governor Cecilia Marcos of the Nacionalista Party initially ran for a third term, but withdrew on October 8, 2024, to run for governor of Ilocos Norte.

The Nacionalista Party substituted Marcos with Ilocos Norte governor Matthew Manotoc, who won the election unopposed.

Candidate	Party	Votes	%
Matthew Manotoc	Nacionalista Party	313,943	100.00
Total		313,943	100.00
Valid votes		313,943	80.92
Invalid/blank votes		74,014	19.08
Total votes		387,957	100.00
Registered voters/turnout		436,087	88.96
Nacionalista hold			
Source: Commission on Elections

=== Provincial Board ===
The Ilocos Norte Provincial Board is composed of 13 board members, 10 of whom are elected.

The Nacionalista Party won seven seats, maintaining its majority in the provincial board.

Party	Votes	%	Seats	+/–
Nacionalista Party	808,924	69.79	7	–1
Partido para sa Demokratikong Reporma	192,899	16.64	2	+2
Independent	157,220	13.56	1	0
Total	1,159,043	100.00	10	0
Total votes	387,957	–		
Registered voters/turnout	436,087	88.96		
Source: Commission on Elections

==== 1st district ====
Ilocos Norte's 1st provincial district consists of the same area as Ilocos Norte's 1st legislative district. Five board members are elected from this provincial district.

Nine candidates were included in the ballot.

Candidate	Party	Votes	%
RJ Fariñas	Partido para sa Demokratikong Reporma	104,726	16.29
Hanson Chua	Nacionalista Party	98,834	15.38
Junior Fariñas (incumbent)	Partido para sa Demokratikong Reporma	88,173	13.72
Marlon Sales	Nacionalista Party	84,725	13.18
Saul Lazo (incumbent)	Nacionalista Party	78,157	12.16
Franklin Dante Respicio (incumbent)	Nacionalista Party	72,103	11.22
Portia Salenda (incumbent)	Nacionalista Party	69,071	10.75
Edison Bonoan	Independent	40,965	6.37
Bong Crisostomo	Independent	6,049	0.94
Total		642,803	100.00
Total votes		201,859	–
Registered voters/turnout		228,771	88.24
Source: Commission on Elections

==== 2nd district ====
Ilocos Norte's 2nd provincial district consists of the same area as Ilocos Norte's 2nd legislative district. Five board members are elected from this provincial district.

Seven candidates were included in the ballot.

Candidate	Party	Votes	%
Rafael Salvador Medina (incumbent)	Nacionalista Party	107,725	20.87
Joefrey Saguid	Nacionalista Party	85,392	16.54
Medeldorf Gaoat (incumbent)	Nacionalista Party	82,669	16.01
Gian Crisostomo (incumbent)	Nacionalista Party	76,657	14.85
Aladine Santos (incumbent)	Independent	68,310	13.23
Jonathan Torralba (incumbent)	Nacionalista Party	53,591	10.38
James Paul Nalupta	Independent	41,896	8.12
Total		516,240	100.00
Total votes		186,098	–
Registered voters/turnout		207,316	89.77
Source: Commission on Elections

== Ilocos Sur ==
=== Governor ===
Incumbent Governor Jerry Singson of the Bileg Party won re-election for a second term unopposed. He was previously affiliated with the Nationalist People's Coalition.

Candidate	Party	Votes	%
Jerry Singson (incumbent)	Bileg Party	328,528	100.00
Total		328,528	100.00
Valid votes		328,528	75.95
Invalid/blank votes		104,027	24.05
Total votes		432,555	100.00
Registered voters/turnout		487,233	88.78
Bileg hold			
Source: Commission on Elections

=== Vice Governor ===
Incumbent Vice Governor Ryan Luis Singson of the Bileg Party won re-election for a second term unopposed.

Candidate	Party	Votes	%
Ryan Luis Singson (incumbent)	Bileg Party	331,144	100.00
Total		331,144	100.00
Valid votes		331,144	76.56
Invalid/blank votes		101,411	23.44
Total votes		432,555	100.00
Registered voters/turnout		487,233	88.78
Bileg hold			
Source: Commission on Elections

=== Provincial Board ===
The Ilocos Sur Provincial Board is composed of 14 board members, 10 of whom are elected.

The Bileg Party won nine seats, gaining a majority in the provincial board.

Party	Votes	%	Seats	+/–
Bileg Party	972,504	82.97	9	+6
Partido Federal ng Pilipinas	137,381	11.72	1	New
Independent	62,262	5.31	0	0
Total	1,172,147	100.00	10	0
Total votes	432,555	–		
Registered voters/turnout	487,233	88.78		
Source: Commission on Elections

==== 1st district ====
Ilocos Sur's 1st provincial district consists of the same area as Ilocos Sur's 1st legislative district. Five board members are elected from this provincial district.

Five candidates were included in the ballot.

Candidate	Party	Votes	%
Janina Medina-Fariñas	Bileg Party	107,643	21.26
Art Oandasan (incumbent)	Bileg Party	102,639	20.27
Third Ranches (incumbent)	Bileg Party	100,886	19.93
King Rambo Rafanan	Bileg Party	100,275	19.80
Maing Baterina	Bileg Party	94,876	18.74
Total		506,319	100.00
Total votes		181,487	–
Registered voters/turnout		205,761	88.20
Source: Commission on Elections

==== 2nd district ====
Ilocos Sur's 2nd provincial district consists of the same area as Ilocos Sur's 2nd legislative district. Five board members are elected from this provincial district.

Six candidates were included in the ballot.

Candidate	Party	Votes	%
Ericson Singson (incumbent)	Partido Federal ng Pilipinas	137,381	20.63
Ben Maggay (incumbent)	Bileg Party	122,435	18.39
Fayinna Pilar Zaragoza	Bileg Party	119,489	17.95
Boy Gironella (incumbent)	Bileg Party	113,444	17.04
Pablito Sanidad Jr.	Bileg Party	110,817	16.64
Juan Abaya Jr.	Independent	62,262	9.35
Total		665,828	100.00
Total votes		251,068	–
Registered voters/turnout		281,472	89.20
Source: Commission on Elections

== La Union ==
=== Governor ===
Incumbent Governor Raphaelle Ortega-David of the Nationalist People's Coalition ran for a second term. She was previously affiliated with Pederalismo ng Dugong Dakilang Samahan.

Ortega-David was defeated by her granduncle, La Union vice governor Mario Eduardo Ortega of the Partido Federal ng Pilipinas. Manny Fonseca (Independent) and Paco Santiago (Independent) also ran for governor.

Candidate	Party	Votes	%
Mario Eduardo Ortega	Partido Federal ng Pilipinas	277,097	60.02
Raphaelle Ortega-David (incumbent)	Nationalist People's Coalition	180,431	39.08
Manny Fonseca	Independent	2,542	0.55
Paco Santiago	Independent	1,605	0.35
Total		461,675	100.00
Valid votes		461,675	94.79
Invalid/blank votes		25,398	5.21
Total votes		487,073	100.00
Registered voters/turnout		554,274	87.88
PFP gain from NPC			
Source: Commission on Elections

=== Vice Governor ===
Incumbent Vice Governor Mario Eduardo Ortega of the Partido Federal ng Pilipinas ran for governor of La Union.

Ortega endorsed Aringay mayor Eric Sibuma (Lakas–CMD), who won the election against former representative Thomas Dumpit Jr. (Nationalist People's Coalition).

Candidate	Party	Votes	%
Eric Sibuma	Lakas–CMD	286,987	67.74
Thomas Dumpit Jr.	Nationalist People's Coalition	136,685	32.26
Total		423,672	100.00
Valid votes		423,672	86.98
Invalid/blank votes		63,401	13.02
Total votes		487,073	100.00
Registered voters/turnout		554,274	87.88
Lakas gain from PFP			
Source: Commission on Elections

=== Provincial Board ===
The La Union Provincial Board is composed of 13 board members, 10 of whom are elected.

Lakas–CMD won eight seats, gaining a majority in the provincial board.

Party	Votes	%	Seats	+/–
Lakas–CMD	1,182,172	68.18	8	+6
Nationalist People's Coalition	281,715	16.25	0	–4
Liberal Party	51,642	2.98	0	–1
Independent	218,477	12.60	2	+2
Total	1,734,006	100.00	10	0
Total votes	487,073	–		
Registered voters/turnout	554,274	87.88		
Source: Commission on Elections

==== 1st district ====
La Union's 1st provincial district consists of the same area as La Union's 1st legislative district. Five board members are elected from this provincial district.

Ten candidates were included in the ballot.

Candidate	Party	Votes	%
Chary Nisce (incumbent)	Lakas–CMD	119,660	17.22
Migz Magsaysay	Independent	102,828	14.80
Gerard Ostrea (incumbent)	Lakas–CMD	82,565	11.88
Aaron Kyle Pinzon	Lakas–CMD	80,643	11.61
Ernesto Rafon	Independent	76,427	11.00
Jen Mosuela-Fernandez (incumbent)	Lakas–CMD	69,923	10.06
Nikko Fontanilla	Lakas–CMD	68,943	9.92
Jay Jay Orros	Nationalist People's Coalition	54,642	7.86
Denny Ortega	Independent	34,228	4.93
Ren Bumatay	Independent	4,994	0.72
Total		694,853	100.00
Total votes		217,393	–
Registered voters/turnout		245,584	88.52
Source: Commission on Elections

==== 2nd district ====
La Union's 2nd provincial district consists of the same area as La Union's 2nd legislative district. Five board members are elected from this provincial district.

Ten candidates were included in the ballot.

Candidate	Party	Votes	%
Alyssa Kristine Sibuma	Lakas–CMD	165,895	15.96
Tess Garcia	Lakas–CMD	163,075	15.69
Martin de Guzman	Lakas–CMD	155,815	14.99
Ruperto Rillera Jr. (incumbent)	Lakas–CMD	143,342	13.79
Jeferson Fernando	Lakas–CMD	132,311	12.73
Henry Balbin (incumbent)	Nationalist People's Coalition	79,339	7.63
Christian Rivera	Nationalist People's Coalition	69,602	6.70
Cynthia Bacurnay (incumbent)	Liberal Party	51,642	4.97
Gina Estepa-Flores	Nationalist People's Coalition	45,209	4.35
Alberto Nidoy	Nationalist People's Coalition	32,923	3.17
Total		1,039,153	100.00
Total votes		269,680	–
Registered voters/turnout		308,690	87.36
Source: Commission on Elections

== Pangasinan ==
=== Governor ===
Incumbent Governor Ramon Guico III of the Nacionalista Party ran for a second term.

Guico won re-election against former Pangasinan governor Amado Espino III (Abante Pangasinan-Ilokano Party).

Candidate	Party	Votes	%
Ramon Guico III (incumbent)	Nacionalista Party	881,307	52.91
Amado Espino III	Abante Pangasinan-Ilokano Party	784,470	47.09
Total		1,665,777	100.00
Valid votes		1,665,777	95.50
Invalid/blank votes		78,506	4.50
Total votes		1,744,283	100.00
Registered voters/turnout		2,011,825	86.70
Nacionalista hold			
Source: Commission on Elections

=== Vice Governor ===
Incumbent Vice Governor Mark Lambino of Lakas–CMD ran for a third term.

Lambino won re-election against former Dasol mayor Noel Nacar (Abante Pangasinan-Ilokano Party).

Candidate	Party	Votes	%
Mark Lambino (incumbent)	Lakas–CMD	1,022,160	72.62
Noel Nacar	Abante Pangasinan-Ilokano Party	385,316	27.38
Total		1,407,476	100.00
Valid votes		1,407,476	80.69
Invalid/blank votes		336,807	19.31
Total votes		1,744,283	100.00
Registered voters/turnout		2,011,825	86.70
Nacionalista hold			
Source: Commission on Elections

=== Provincial Board ===
The Pangasinan Provincial Board is composed of 15 board members, 12 of whom are elected.

The Nacionalista Party won seven seats, becoming the largest party in the provincial board.

Party	Votes	%	Seats	+/–
Nacionalista Party	1,178,852	44.64	7	+5
Abante Pangasinan-Ilokano Party	484,918	18.36	1	–7
Nationalist People's Coalition	424,144	16.06	1	–1
Lakas–CMD	264,370	10.01	1	+1
Liberal Party	89,563	3.39	1	New
Partido Pederal ng Maharlika	58,709	2.22	0	0
Independent	140,237	5.31	1	+1
Total	2,640,793	100.00	12	0
Total votes	1,744,283	–		
Registered voters/turnout	2,011,825	86.70		
Source: Commission on Elections

==== 1st district ====
Pangasinan's 1st provincial district consists of the same area as Pangasinan's 1st legislative district. Two board members are elected from this provincial district.

Three candidates were included in the ballot.

Candidate	Party	Votes	%
Apple Bacay (incumbent)	Nacionalista Party	149,957	43.72
Napoleon Fontelera Jr. (incumbent)	Nacionalista Party	130,912	38.17
Ricky Camba	Abante Pangasinan-Ilokano Party	62,091	18.10
Total		342,960	100.00
Total votes		257,403	–
Registered voters/turnout		303,690	84.76
Source: Commission on Elections

==== 2nd district ====
Pangasinan's 2nd provincial district consists of the same area as Pangasinan's 2nd legislative district. Two board members are elected from this provincial district.

Five candidates were included in the ballot.

Candidate	Party	Votes	%
Philip Theodore Cruz (incumbent)	Nationalist People's Coalition	206,841	40.60
Haidee Pacheco (incumbent)	Nacionalista Party	178,587	35.06
Nikiboy Reyes	Abante Pangasinan-Ilokano Party	94,112	18.47
Manuel Merrera	Independent	19,667	3.86
Dondon Fernandez	Independent	10,219	2.01
Total		509,426	100.00
Total votes		319,974	–
Registered voters/turnout		365,279	87.60
Source: Commission on Elections

==== 3rd district ====
Pangasinan's 3rd provincial district consists of the same area as Pangasinan's 3rd legislative district. Two board members are elected from this provincial district.

Five candidates were included in the ballot.

Candidate	Party	Votes	%
Shiela Baniqued (incumbent)	Nacionalista Party	253,736	41.39
Vici Ventanilla (incumbent)	Nacionalista Party	199,518	32.55
Joseph Arman Bauzon	Abante Pangasinan-Ilokano Party	92,952	15.16
Generoso Tulagan Jr.	Nationalist People's Coalition	55,755	9.09
Eduardo Gonzales	Partido Pederal ng Maharlika	11,074	1.81
Total		613,035	100.00
Total votes		388,143	–
Registered voters/turnout		454,801	85.34
Source: Commission on Elections

==== 4th district ====
Pangasinan's 4th provincial district consists of the same area as Pangasinan's 4th legislative district, excluding the city of Dagupan. Two board members are elected from this provincial district.

Three candidates were included in the ballot.

Candidate	Party	Votes	%
Noy de Guzman (incumbent)	Nacionalista Party	103,967	42.44
Jerry Rosario (incumbent)	Nacionalista Party	83,361	34.03
Aldrin Soriano	Abante Pangasinan-Ilokano Party	57,639	23.53
Total		244,967	100.00
Total votes		175,672	–
Registered voters/turnout		205,541	85.47
Source: Commission on Elections

==== 5th district ====
Pangasinan's 5th provincial district consists of the same area as Pangasinan's 5th legislative district. Two board members are elected from this provincial district.

Four candidates were included in the ballot.

Candidate	Party	Votes	%
Rose Apaga	Abante Pangasinan-Ilokano Party	178,124	36.34
Louie Sison (incumbent)	Lakas–CMD	149,149	30.43
Isong Basco	Lakas–CMD	115,221	23.51
Hero Sumera	Partido Pederal ng Maharlika	47,635	9.72
Total		490,129	100.00
Total votes		312,206	–
Registered voters/turnout		357,155	87.41
Source: Commission on Elections

==== 6th district ====
Pangasinan's 6th provincial district consists of the same area as Pangasinan's 6th legislative district. Two board members are elected from this provincial district.

Six candidates were included in the ballot.

Candidate	Party	Votes	%
Noel Bince (incumbent)	Independent	102,362	23.25
Ranjit Shahani	Liberal Party	89,563	20.34
Sheila Marie Perez	Nationalist People's Coalition	83,957	19.07
Rebecca Saldivar	Nacionalista Party	78,814	17.90
Ric Revita	Nationalist People's Coalition	77,591	17.62
Walter Aquino	Independent	7,989	1.81
Total		440,276	100.00
Total votes		290,885	–
Registered voters/turnout		325,359	89.40
Source: Commission on Elections

== Incidents ==
On December 7, 2024, Ponciano Onia Jr., a reelectionist councilor of Umingan, Pangasinan, and concurrent national president of Abono Partylist, was shot dead in an ambush. On January 25, 2025, Anthony Verzola, a reelectionist municipal councilor of Caoayan, Ilocos Sur, was shot dead by unidentified gunmen riding motorcycles in Vigan.
