= 2025 Ilocos Sur local elections =

Part of the 2025 Philippine general election

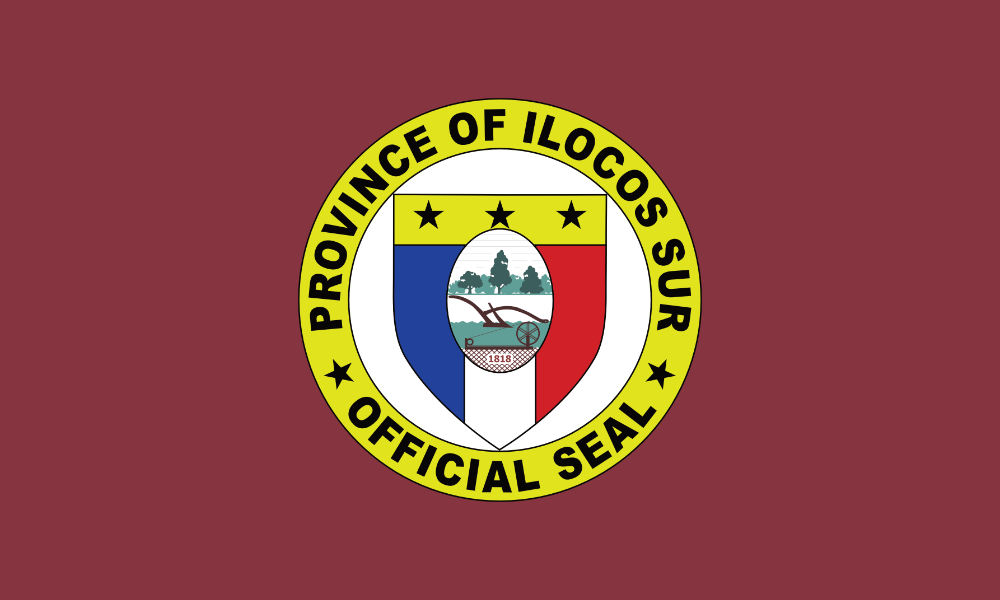
- May 12, 2025
- Gubernatorial election
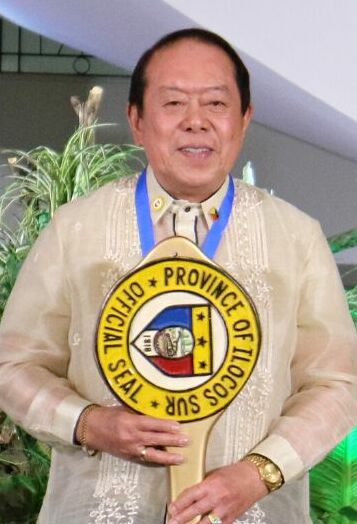
Candidate	Jerry Singson
Party	Bileg
Running mate	Ryan Luis Singson
Incumbent Governor
Jerry Singson
Bileg
- Vice gubernatorial election
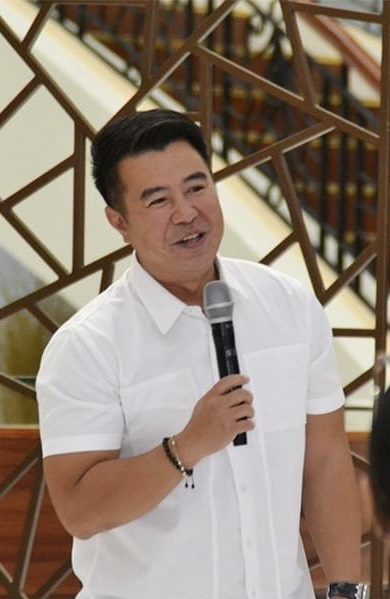
Candidate	Ryan Luis Singson
Party	Bileg
Incumbent Vice Governor
Ryan Luis Singson
Bileg
- Provincial Board election
- 10 out of 14 seats in the Ilocos Sur Provincial Board; 8 seats needed for a majority
Party	Current seats
Bileg	6
NPC	2
KBL	1
PFP	1

Local elections were held in Ilocos Sur on May 12, 2025, as part of the 2025 Philippine general election. Ilocos Sur voters will elect a governor, a vice governor, and 10 out of 14 members of the Ilocos Sur Provincial Board.

== Governor ==
Incumbent Jerry Singson (Bileg Party) is running for a second term unopposed. Singson was elected under the Nationalist People's Coalition unopposed in 2022.

=== Candidates ===
The following are the candidates who are included in the ballot:

No.	Candidate	Party
1	Jerry Singson (incumbent)	Bileg Party

=== Results ===
Candidate	Party	Votes	%
Jerry Singson (incumbent)	Bileg Party	328,528	100.00
Total		328,528	100.00
Valid votes		328,528	75.95
Invalid/blank votes		104,027	24.05
Total votes		432,555	100.00
Registered voters/turnout		487,233	88.78
Bileg Party hold			
Source: Commission on Elections

== Vice governor ==
Incumbent Ryan Luis Singson (Bileg Party) is running for a second term unopposed. Singson was elected unopposed in 2022.

=== Candidates ===
The following are the candidates who are included in the ballot:

No.	Candidate	Party
1	Ryan Luis Singson (incumbent)	Bileg Party

=== Results ===
Candidate	Party	Votes	%
Ryan Luis Singson (incumbent)	Bileg Party	331,144	100.00
Total		331,144	100.00
Valid votes		331,144	76.56
Invalid/blank votes		101,411	23.44
Total votes		432,555	100.00
Registered voters/turnout		487,233	88.78
Bileg Party hold			
Source: Commission on Elections

== House of Representatives ==
=== Ilocos Sur's 1st district ===
Incumbent Ronald Singson (Nationalist People's Coalition) is running for a second term. Singson was elected with 57.48% of the vote in 2022.

==== Candidates ====
The following candidates are included in the ballot:

- Charles Savellano (Independent), farmer
- Ronald Singson (Nationalist People's Coalition), incumbent representative

Charles Savellano was initially declared to be a nuisance candidate by the Commission on Elections. However, the Supreme Court ordered on January 14, 2025, to include Savellano in the ballot.

==== Results ====
Candidate	Party	Votes	%
Ronald Singson (incumbent)	Nationalist People's Coalition	143,361	92.36
Charles Savellano	Independent	11,854	7.64
Total		155,215	100.00
Valid votes		155,215	85.52
Invalid/blank votes		26,272	14.48
Total votes		181,487	100.00
Registered voters/turnout		205,761	88.20
Nationalist People's Coalition hold			
Source: Commission on Elections

=== Ilocos Sur's 2nd district ===
Incumbent Kristine Singson-Meehan (Nationalist People's Coalition) is running for a third term. Singson-Meehan was re-elected unopposed in 2022.

==== Candidates ====
The following candidates are included in the ballot:

- Kristine Singson-Meehan (Nationalist People's Coalition), incumbent representative
- Roque Verzosa Jr. (Independent), mayor of Tagudin (since 2016)

==== Results ====
Candidate	Party	Votes	%
Kristine Singson-Meehan (incumbent)	Nationalist People's Coalition	163,262	68.18
Roque Verzosa Jr.	Independent	76,181	31.82
Total		239,443	100.00
Valid votes		239,443	95.37
Invalid/blank votes		11,625	4.63
Total votes		251,068	100.00
Registered voters/turnout		281,472	89.20
Nationalist People's Coalition hold			
Source: Commission on Elections

== Provincial Board ==
The Ilocos Sur Provincial Board is composed of 14 board members, 10 of whom are elected.

Party	Votes	%	Seats	+/–
Bileg Party	972,504	82.97	9	+6
Partido Federal ng Pilipinas	137,381	11.72	1	New
Independent	62,262	5.31	0	0
Total	1,172,147	100.00	10	0
Total votes	432,555	–		
Registered voters/turnout	487,233	88.78		
Source: Commission on Elections

=== Term-limited board members ===
The following board members are term-limited:

- Topeng Baterina (Bileg Party, 1st District)
- Gina Cordero (Nationalist People's Coalition, 2nd District)
- Mildred Elaydo (Nationalist People's Coalition, 2nd District)
- Rambo Rafanan (Kilusang Bagong Lipunan, 1st District)
- Ronnie Rapanut (Bileg Party, 1st District)

=== 1st Provincial District ===
Ilocos Sur's 1st provincial district consists of the same area as Ilocos Sur's 1st legislative district. Five board members are elected from this provincial district.

==== Candidates ====
The following are the candidates who are included in the ballot:

No.	Candidate	Party
1	Maing Baterina	Bileg Party
2	Janina Medina-Fariñas	Bileg Party
3	Art Oandasan (incumbent)	Bileg Party
4	Reymark Rafanan	Bileg Party
5	Third Ranches (incumbent)	Bileg Party

Candidate	Party	Votes	%
Janina Medina-Fariñas	Bileg Party	107,643	21.26
Art Oandasan (incumbent)	Bileg Party	102,639	20.27
Third Ranches (incumbent)	Bileg Party	100,886	19.93
King Rambo Rafanan	Bileg Party	100,275	19.80
Maing Baterina	Bileg Party	94,876	18.74
Total		506,319	100.00
Total votes		181,487	–
Registered voters/turnout		205,761	88.20
Source: Commission on Elections

=== 2nd Provincial District ===
Ilocos Sur's 2nd provincial district consists of the same area as Ilocos Sur's 2nd legislative district. Five board members are elected from this provincial district.

==== Candidates ====
The following are the candidates who are included in the ballot:

No.	Candidate	Party
1	Juan Abaya Jr.	Independent
2	Boy Gironella (incumbent)	Bileg Party
3	Ben Maggay (incumbent)	Bileg Party
4	Pablito Sanidad Jr.	Bileg Party
5	Ericson Singson (incumbent)	Partido Federal ng Pilipinas
6	Fayinna Pilar Zaragoza	Bileg Party

Candidate	Party	Votes	%
Ericson Singson (incumbent)	Partido Federal ng Pilipinas	137,381	20.63
Ben Maggay (incumbent)	Bileg Party	122,435	18.39
Fayinna Pilar Zaragoza	Bileg Party	119,489	17.95
Boy Gironella (incumbent)	Bileg Party	113,444	17.04
Pablito Sanidad Jr.	Bileg Party	110,817	16.64
Juan Abaya Jr.	Independent	62,262	9.35
Total		665,828	100.00
Total votes		251,068	–
Registered voters/turnout		281,472	89.20
Source: Commission on Elections

== Incidents ==
On January 25, 2025, Anthony Verzola, a reelectionist municipal councilor of Caoayan, was shot dead by unidentified gunmen riding motorcycles in Vigan.
