= 2022 Philippine local elections in the Ilocos Region =

- May 9, 2022
- Gubernatorial elections
- 4 provincial governors and 1 city mayor
Party	Seats	+/–
Nacionalista	2	0
Aksyon	1	New
NPC	1	New
PDDS	1	New
This lists parties that won seats. See the complete results below.
- Vice gubernatorial elections
- 4 provincial vice governors and 1 city vice mayor
Party	Seats	+/–
Aksyon	1	New
Bileg	1	0
Lakas	1	0
Nacionalista	1	0
Independent	1	New
This lists parties that won seats. See the complete results below.
- Provincial Board elections
- 42 provincial board members and 10 city councilors
Party	Seats	+/–
Nacionalista	18	+10
NPC	12	+6
API	8	New
Bileg	3	−7
Aksyon	2	New
Lakas	2	−6
PDP–Laban	2	−12
KANP	1	New
KBL	1	New
Liberal	1	0
PFP	1	+1
Independent	1	+1
This lists parties that won seats. See the complete results below.

The 2022 Philippine local elections in the Ilocos Region were held on May 9, 2022.

== Summary ==
=== Governors ===
Province/city	Incumbent	Incumbent's party	Winner	Winner's party	Winning margin
Dagupan (ICC)	Brian Lim	Nacionalista	Belen Fernandez	Aksyon	11.95%
Ilocos Norte	Matthew Manotoc	Nacionalista	Matthew Manotoc	Nacionalista	47.02%
Ilocos Sur	Ryan Luis Singson	Bileg	Jerry Singson	NPC	Unopposed
La Union	Francisco Ortega III	NPC	Raphaelle Ortega-David	PDDS	79.44%
Pangasinan	Amado Espino III	API	Ramon Guico III	Nacionalista	11.81%

=== Vice governors ===
Province/city	Incumbent	Incumbent's party	Winner	Winner's party	Winning margin
Dagupan (ICC)	Bryan Kua	Aksyon	Bryan Kua	Aksyon	26.68%
Ilocos Norte	Cecilia Marcos	Nacionalista	Cecilia Marcos	Nacionalista	89.91%
Ilocos Sur	Jerry Singson	NPC	Ryan Luis Singson	Bileg	Unopposed
La Union	Mario Eduardo Ortega	Independent	Mario Eduardo Ortega	Independent	Unopposed
Pangasinan	Mark Lambino	Lakas	Mark Lambino	Lakas	22.90%

=== Provincial boards ===
Province/city	Seats	Party control		Composition
Province/city	Seats	Previous	Result	Composition
Dagupan (ICC)	10 elected 2 ex-officio	Lakas	Nacionalista	Nacionalista (7); Aksyon (2); KNP (1)
Ilocos Norte	10 elected 3 ex-officio	Nacionalista	Nacionalista	Nacionalista (8); PDP–Laban (1); Independent (1)
Ilocos Sur	10 elected 4 ex-officio	Bileg	No majority	NPC (6); Bileg (3); KBL (1)
La Union	10 elected 3 ex-officio	No majority	No majority	NPC (4); Lakas (2); PFP (1); Nacionalista (1); Liberal (1); PDP–Laban (1)
Pangasinan	12 elected 3 ex-officio	PDP–Laban	API	API (8); NPC (2); Nacionalista (2)

== Dagupan ==
=== Mayor ===
Incumbent Mayor Brian Lim of the Nacionalista Party ran for a second term.

Lim was defeated by former Dagupan mayor Belen Fernandez of Aksyon Demokratiko. Juan Siapno Jr. (Independent) also ran for mayor.

Candidate	Party	Votes	%
Belen Fernandez	Aksyon Demokratiko	67,499	55.80
Brian Lim (incumbent)	Nacionalista Party	53,042	43.85
Juan Siapno Jr.	Independent	417	0.34
Total		120,958	100.00
Total votes		124,668	–
Registered voters/turnout		138,721	89.87
Aksyon gain from Nacionalista			
Source: Commission on Elections

=== Vice Mayor ===
Incumbent Vice Mayor Bryan Kua of Aksyon Demokratiko ran for a second term. He was previously affiliated with Lakas–CMD.

Kua won re-election against Carlos Alipio Fernandez (Nacionalista Party).

Candidate	Party	Votes	%
Bryan Kua (incumbent)	Aksyon Demokratiko	73,766	63.34
Carlos Alipio Fernandez	Nacionalista Party	42,689	36.66
Total		116,455	100.00
Total votes		124,668	–
Registered voters/turnout		138,721	89.87
Aksyon hold			
Source: Commission on Elections

=== City Council ===
The Dagupan City Council is composed of 12 councilors, 10 of whom are elected.

29 candidates were included in the ballot.

The Nacionalista Party won seven seats, gaining a majority in the city council.

Party	Votes	%	Seats	+/–
Nacionalista Party	483,527	48.17	7	+4
Aksyon Demokratiko	340,183	33.89	2	New
Katipunan ng Nagkakaisang Pilipino	97,916	9.75	1	New
Kilusang Bagong Lipunan	35,039	3.49	0	New
Independent	47,207	4.70	0	0
Total	1,003,872	100.00	10	0
Total votes	124,668	–		
Registered voters/turnout	138,721	89.87		

Candidate	Party	Votes	%
Dada Manaois Reyna (incumbent)	Nacionalista Party	69,392	6.91
Jigs Seen	Aksyon Demokratiko	59,340	5.91
Alvin Coquia	Nacionalista Party	59,237	5.90
Celia Lim (incumbent)	Nacionalista Party	57,889	5.77
Malou Fernandez	Nacionalista Party	57,693	5.75
Alipio Serafin Fernandez	Nacionalista Party	57,106	5.69
Red Erfe-Mejia	Nacionalista Party	54,480	5.43
Dennis Canto (incumbent)	Aksyon Demokratiko	53,720	5.35
Irene Lim Acosta	Nacionalista Party	51,787	5.16
Michael Fernandez (incumbent)	Katipunan ng Nagkakaisang Pilipino	51,211	5.10
Chito Samson (incumbent)	Aksyon Demokratiko	49,123	4.89
Tess Coquia (incumbent)	Aksyon Demokratiko	48,242	4.81
Karlos Reyna (incumbent)	Katipunan ng Nagkakaisang Pilipino	46,705	4.65
Teddy Villamil Jr.	Nacionalista Party	43,380	4.32
Emong Vallejos	Aksyon Demokratiko	36,275	3.61
Diane Decano	Aksyon Demokratiko	35,604	3.55
Leo Cuaton	Kilusang Bagong Lipunan	35,039	3.49
Jek Palaganas	Nacionalista Party	32,563	3.24
Josh Bugayong	Aksyon Demokratiko	32,141	3.20
Danila Cayabyab	Aksyon Demokratiko	25,738	2.56
Raul delos Santos	Independent	11,941	1.19
Jonarch Aquino Jr.	Independent	7,664	0.76
Bizzyblade dela Cruz	Independent	6,583	0.66
Pink Salve Bravo	Independent	4,849	0.48
Mercy Saplan	Independent	3,732	0.37
Manuel John Sia	Independent	3,600	0.36
Mary Rose Olaguer	Independent	3,550	0.35
Alfredo Dawana	Independent	3,423	0.34
Anselmo Atabes	Independent	1,865	0.19
Total		1,003,872	100.00
Total votes		124,668	–
Registered voters/turnout		138,721	89.87
Source: Commission on Elections

== Ilocos Norte ==
=== Governor ===
Incumbent Governor Matthew Manotoc of the Nacionalista Party ran for a second term.

Manotoc won re-election against former representative Rodolfo Fariñas (Partido para sa Demokratikong Reporma).

The Partido para sa Demokratikong Reporma initially nominated Juner Jacinto, but was substituted on November 15, 2021, by Fariñas.

Candidate	Party	Votes	%
Matthew Manotoc (incumbent)	Nacionalista Party	261,885	73.51
Rodolfo Fariñas	Partido para sa Demokratikong Reporma	94,372	26.49
Total		356,257	100.00
Total votes		380,721	–
Registered voters/turnout		434,114	87.70
Nacionalista hold			
Source: Commission on Elections

=== Vice Governor ===
Incumbent Vice Governor Cecilia Marcos of the Nacionalista Party ran for a second term.

Marcos won re-election against three other candidates.

Candidate	Party	Votes	%
Cecilia Marcos (incumbent)	Nacionalista Party	267,896	92.77
Michael Ramones	PDP–Laban	8,254	2.86
Sherwin Bumanglag	Partido para sa Demokratikong Reporma	7,785	2.70
Joy Mintalon Butay	Independent	4,835	1.67
Total		288,770	100.00
Total votes		380,721	–
Registered voters/turnout		434,114	87.70
Nacionalista hold			
Source: Commission on Elections

=== Provincial Board ===
The Ilocos Norte Provincial Board is composed of 13 board members, 10 of whom are elected.

The Nacionalista Party won eight seats, maintaining its majority in the provincial board.

Party	Votes	%	Seats	+/–
Nacionalista Party	688,502	65.68	8	0
PDP–Laban	187,891	17.92	1	–1
Kilusang Bagong Lipunan	35,495	3.39	0	New
Partido para sa Demokratikong Reporma	4,868	0.46	0	New
Independent	131,537	12.55	1	+1
Total	1,048,293	100.00	10	0
Total votes	380,721	–		
Registered voters/turnout	434,114	87.70		

==== 1st district ====
Ilocos Norte's 1st provincial district consists of the same area as Ilocos Norte's 1st legislative district. Five board members are elected from this provincial district.

Eight candidates were included in the ballot.

Candidate	Party	Votes	%
Junior Fariñas (incumbent)	PDP–Laban	90,259	17.18
Saul Lazo (incumbent)	Nacionalista Party	88,031	16.76
Franklin Dante Respicio (incumbent)	Nacionalista Party	83,423	15.88
Donald Nicolas (incumbent)	Nacionalista Party	81,633	15.54
Portia Salenda (incumbent)	Nacionalista Party	78,890	15.02
Modesto de la Cuesta	PDP–Laban	60,262	11.47
Aldrick Peralta	Nacionalista Party	23,963	4.56
Emilio Perucho	Independent	18,895	3.60
Total		525,356	100.00
Total votes		196,629	–
Registered voters/turnout		228,024	86.23
Source: Commission on Elections

==== 2nd district ====
Ilocos Norte's 2nd provincial district consists of the same area as Ilocos Norte's 2nd legislative district. Five board members are elected from this provincial district.

14 candidates were included in the ballot.

Candidate	Party	Votes	%
Rafael Medina	Nacionalista Party	88,094	16.85
Medeldorf Gaoat (incumbent)	Nacionalista Party	81,181	15.52
Aladine Santos (incumbent)	Independent	63,065	12.06
Giancarlo Crisostomo	Nacionalista Party	61,678	11.79
Jonathan Torralba	Nacionalista Party	57,540	11.00
MacArthur Aguinaldo	Nacionalista Party	44,069	8.43
Julu Nalupta	Independent	39,932	7.64
Marcelino Quitoras Jr.	PDP–Laban	37,370	7.15
Marie Dumlao	Kilusang Bagong Lipunan	35,495	6.79
Angelo Raham Sison	Independent	4,199	0.80
Mark Raguindin	Partido para sa Demokratikong Reporma	3,225	0.62
Walter John Lozano Sr.	Independent	2,966	0.57
Coco Reyes	Independent	2,480	0.47
Arvi Anthony Suga	Partido para sa Demokratikong Reporma	1,643	0.31
Total		522,937	100.00
Total votes		184,092	–
Registered voters/turnout		206,090	89.33
Source: Commission on Elections

== Ilocos Sur ==
=== Governor ===
Term-limited incumbent Governor Ryan Luis Singson of the Bileg Party ran for vice governor of Ilocos Sur.

Singson's uncle, Ilocos Sur vice governor Jerry Singson (Nationalist People's Coalition), won the election unopposed. The Bileg Party initially nominated Ryan Luis Singson's wife, Patch Singson, but she withdrew on October 11, 2021.

Candidate	Party	Votes	%
Jerry Singson	Nationalist People's Coalition	313,620	100.00
Total		313,620	100.00
Total votes		424,693	–
Registered voters/turnout		476,984	89.04
NPC gain from Bileg			
Source: Commission on Elections

=== Vice Governor ===
Incumbent Vice Governor Jerry Singson of the Nationalist People's Coalition (NPC) ran for governor of Ilocos Sur. He was previously affiliated with the Bileg Party.

Singson's nephew, Ilocos Sur governor Ryan Luis Singson (Bileg Party), won the election unopposed. The NPC initially nominated Jerry Singson's brother, Narvacan mayor Chavit Singson, but he withdrew on October 11, 2021.

Candidate	Party	Votes	%
Ryan Luis Singson	Bileg Party	326,228	100.00
Total		326,228	100.00
Total votes		424,693	–
Registered voters/turnout		476,984	89.04
Bileg gain from NPC			
Source: Commission on Elections

=== Provincial Board ===
The Ilocos Sur Provincial Board is composed of 14 board members, 10 of whom are elected.

The Nationalist People's Coalition won six seats, becoming the largest party in the provincial board.

Party	Votes	%	Seats	+/–
Nationalist People's Coalition	702,759	61.95	6	New
Bileg Party	263,321	23.21	3	–7
Kilusang Bagong Lipunan	103,598	9.13	1	+1
Independent	64,649	5.70	0	New
Total	1,134,327	100.00	10	0
Total votes	424,693	–		
Registered voters/turnout	476,984	89.04		

==== 1st district ====
Ilocos Sur's 1st provincial district consists of the same area as Ilocos Sur's 1st legislative district. Five board members are elected from this provincial district.

Six candidates were included in the ballot.

Candidate	Party	Votes	%
Rambo Rafanan (incumbent)	Kilusang Bagong Lipunan	103,598	20.42
Ronnie Rapanut (incumbent)	Bileg Party	94,555	18.63
Topeng Baterina (incumbent)	Bileg Party	84,846	16.72
Art Oandasan	Bileg Party	83,920	16.54
Third Ranches	Nationalist People's Coalition	74,117	14.61
JG de Leon	Nationalist People's Coalition	66,420	13.09
Total		507,456	100.00
Total votes		181,982	–
Registered voters/turnout		201,188	90.45
Source: Commission on Elections

==== 2nd district ====
Ilocos Sur's 2nd provincial district consists of the same area as Ilocos Sur's 2nd legislative district. Five board members are elected from this provincial district.

Six candidates were included in the ballot.

Candidate	Party	Votes	%
Ericson Singson	Nationalist People's Coalition	145,525	23.21
Ben Maggay (incumbent)	Nationalist People's Coalition	110,760	17.67
Gina Cordero (incumbent)	Nationalist People's Coalition	110,089	17.56
Boy Gironella	Nationalist People's Coalition	99,390	15.85
Mildred Elaydo (incumbent)	Nationalist People's Coalition	96,458	15.39
Juan Abaya Jr.	Independent	64,649	10.31
Total		626,871	100.00
Total votes		242,711	–
Registered voters/turnout		275,796	88.00
Source: Commission on Elections

== La Union ==
=== Governor ===
Incumbent Governor Francisco Ortega III of the Nationalist People's Coalition initially ran for a third term, but withdrew on November 9, 2021, to run for mayor of San Fernando. He was previously affiliated with PDP–Laban.

Ortega was substituted by his daughter, Raphaelle Ortega-David (Pederalismo ng Dugong Dakilang Samahan), who won the election against Emmanuel Fonseca (Independent).

Candidate	Party	Votes	%
Raphaelle Ortega-David	Pederalismo ng Dugong Dakilang Samahan	348,269	89.72
Emmanuel Fonseca	Independent	39,907	10.28
Total		388,176	100.00
Total votes		471,231	–
Registered voters/turnout		538,730	87.47
PDDS gain from NPC			
Source: Commission on Elections

=== Vice Governor ===
Incumbent Vice Governor Mario Eduardo Ortega (Independent) won re-election for a second term unopposed. He was previously affiliated with the National Unity Party.

Candidate	Party	Votes	%
Mario Eduardo Ortega (incumbent)	Independent	318,826	100.00
Total		318,826	100.00
Total votes		471,231	–
Registered voters/turnout		538,730	87.47
Independent hold			
Source: Commission on Elections

=== Provincial Board ===
The La Union Provincial Board is composed of 13 board members, 10 of whom are elected.

The Nationalist People's Coalition won four seats, becoming the largest party in the provincial board.

Party	Votes	%	Seats	+/–
Nationalist People's Coalition	513,942	35.56	4	0
Lakas–CMD	201,411	13.94	2	New
People's Reform Party	167,349	11.58	0	New
Partido Federal ng Pilipinas	158,097	10.94	1	0
Nacionalista Party	119,648	8.28	1	New
Liberal Party	109,753	7.59	1	0
PDP–Laban	89,450	6.19	1	–3
Partido Pederal ng Maharlika	8,740	0.60	0	New
Independent	76,916	5.32	0	0
Total	1,445,306	100.00	10	0
Total votes	471,231	–		
Registered voters/turnout	538,730	87.47		

==== 1st district ====
La Union's 1st provincial district consists of the same area as La Union's 1st legislative district. Five board members are elected from this provincial district.

Six candidates were included in the ballot.

Candidate	Party	Votes	%
Chary Nisce	Nationalist People's Coalition	128,914	22.35
Joy Ortega	Nacionalista Party	119,648	20.74
Gerard Ostrea (incumbent)	Partido Federal ng Pilipinas	102,886	17.84
Jen Mosuela-Fernandez (incumbent)	Nationalist People's Coalition	85,336	14.79
Rachel Pinzon	Lakas–CMD	74,917	12.99
Michael Marron	Independent	65,105	11.29
Total		576,806	100.00
Total votes		213,909	–
Registered voters/turnout		243,178	87.96
Source: Commission on Elections

==== 2nd district ====
La Union's 2nd provincial district consists of the same area as La Union's 2nd legislative district. Five board members are elected from this provincial district.

12 candidates were included in the ballot.

Candidate	Party	Votes	%
Annabelle de Guzman (incumbent)	Nationalist People's Coalition	144,253	16.61
Henry Balbin	Lakas–CMD	126,494	14.56
Cynthia Bacurnay	Liberal Party	109,753	12.64
Ruperto Rillera Jr.	Nationalist People's Coalition	89,459	10.30
Bronson Rivera	PDP–Laban	89,450	10.30
Tess Garcia	People's Reform Party	75,207	8.66
Abraham Rimando (incumbent)	Nationalist People's Coalition	65,980	7.60
Gabriel Sotto	Partido Federal ng Pilipinas	55,211	6.36
Jayvee Komiya	People's Reform Party	54,544	6.28
Jeferson Fernando	People's Reform Party	37,598	4.33
Oscar Calica	Independent	11,811	1.36
Divina Vallejo	Partido Pederal ng Maharlika	8,740	1.01
Total		868,500	100.00
Total votes		257,322	–
Registered voters/turnout		295,552	87.06
Source: Commission on Elections

== Pangasinan ==
=== Governor ===
Incumbent Governor Amado Espino III of the Abante Pangasinan-Ilokano Party ran for a third term. He was previously affiliated with PDP–Laban.

Espino was defeated by representative Ramon Guico III of the Nacionalista Party. Two other candidates also ran for representative.

Candidate	Party	Votes	%
Ramon Guico III	Nacionalista Party	888,027	55.61
Amado Espino III (incumbent)	Abante Pangasinan-Ilokano Party	699,441	43.80
Rolly Jimenez	Independent	6,224	0.39
Caloy Padilla	Philippine Green Republican Party	3,251	0.20
Total		1,596,943	100.00
Total votes		1,703,528	–
Registered voters/turnout		1,958,215	86.99
Nacionalista gain from API			
Source: Commission on Elections (Note: Total votes and registered voters from Dagupan are excluded as the city's voters are ineligible to vote for provincial officials in Pangasinan.)

=== Vice Governor ===
Incumbent Vice Mark Lambino of Lakas–CMD ran for a second term. He was previously affiliated with the Nationalist People's Coalition.

Lambino won re-election against provincial board member Nikiboy Reyes (Abante Pangasinan-Ilokano Party).

Candidate	Party	Votes	%
Mark Lambino (incumbent)	Lakas–CMD	880,348	61.45
Nikiboy Reyes	Abante Pangasinan-Ilokano Party	552,212	38.55
Total		1,432,560	100.00
Total votes		1,703,528	–
Registered voters/turnout		1,958,215	86.99
Lakas hold			
Source: Commission on Elections

=== Provincial Board ===
The Pangasinan Provincial Board consists of 15 board members, 12 of whom are elected.

The Abante Pangasinan-Ilokano Party won eight seats, gaining a majority in the provincial board.

Party	Votes	%	Seats	+/–
Abante Pangasinan-Ilokano Party	1,324,279	50.67	8	New
Nationalist People's Coalition	563,186	21.55	2	0
Nacionalista Party	373,911	14.31	2	+1
Lakas–CMD	203,352	7.78	0	–1
PROMDI	60,874	2.33	0	New
PDP–Laban	15,644	0.60	0	–8
Partido Pederal ng Maharlika	5,216	0.20	0	New
Partido Federal ng Pilipinas	3,707	0.14	0	New
National Unity Party	2,168	0.08	0	New
Philippine Green Republican Party	837	0.03	0	New
Independent	60,439	2.31	0	0
Total	2,613,613	100.00	12	0
Total votes	1,703,528	–		
Registered voters/turnout	1,958,215	86.99		

==== 1st district ====
Pangasinan's 1st provincial district consists of the same area as Pangasinan's 1st legislative district. Two board members are elected from this provincial district.

Four candidates were included in the ballot.

Candidate	Party	Votes	%
Nong Fontelera	Nacionalista Party	115,366	30.42
Apple Bacay	Nacionalista Party	106,387	28.06
Orange Humilde-Verzosa (incumbent)	Abante Pangasinan-Ilokano Party	85,665	22.59
Ricky Camba	Abante Pangasinan-Ilokano Party	71,787	18.93
Total		379,205	100.00
Total votes		255,660	–
Registered voters/turnout		294,221	86.89
Source: Commission on Elections

==== 2nd district ====
Pangasinan's 2nd provincial district consists of the same area as Pangasinan's 2nd legislative district. Two board members are elected from this provincial district.

Six candidates were included in the ballot.

Candidate	Party	Votes	%
Philip Theodore Cruz	Nationalist People's Coalition	123,722	25.83
Haidee Pacheco	Abante Pangasinan-Ilokano Party	114,569	23.92
Von Mark Mendoza (incumbent)	Nationalist People's Coalition	109,708	22.91
Randall Bernal	Abante Pangasinan-Ilokano Party	98,738	20.62
Manuel Merrera	Independent	21,245	4.44
Bony Batecan	PDP–Laban	10,917	2.28
Total		478,899	100.00
Total votes		309,536	–
Registered voters/turnout		351,684	88.02
Source: Commission on Elections

==== 3rd district ====
Pangasinan's 3rd provincial district consists of the same area as Pangasinan's 3rd legislative district. Two board members are elected from this provincial district.

Nine candidates were included in the ballot.

Candidate	Party	Votes	%
Shiela Baniqued	Abante Pangasinan-Ilokano Party	218,204	34.76
Vici Ventanilla (incumbent)	Nationalist People's Coalition	150,874	24.03
Mark Roy Macanlalay	Nationalist People's Coalition	132,939	21.18
Raymund Camacho	Abante Pangasinan-Ilokano Party	51,188	8.15
Generoso Tulagan	PROMDI	44,338	7.06
Rogelio Danoli	PROMDI	16,536	2.63
Eduardo Gonzales	Partido Pederal ng Maharlika	5,216	0.83
Edgar Ramirez	PDP–Laban	4,727	0.75
James Mamaradlo	Partido Federal ng Pilipinas	3,707	0.59
Total		627,729	100.00
Total votes		382,636	–
Registered voters/turnout		441,956	86.58
Source: Commission on Elections

==== 4th district ====
Pangasinan's 4th provincial district consists of the same area as Pangasinan's 4th legislative district, excluding the city of Dagupan. Two board members are elected from this provincial district.

Nine candidates were included in the ballot.

Candidate	Party	Votes	%
Noy de Guzman	Abante Pangasinan-Ilokano Party	80,658	28.17
Jerry Rosario	Abante Pangasinan-Ilokano Party	53,848	18.81
Gerald Gubatan	Nacionalista Party	51,723	18.06
Ritchie Abalos	Nationalist People's Coalition	45,943	16.04
Ramon Bautista	Lakas–CMD	26,272	9.17
Jaming Libunao	Nacionalista Party	22,362	7.81
Santiago Marcella Jr.	Independent	2,536	0.89
Dave Tecson	National Unity Party	2,168	0.76
Jorge Tamondong	Philippine Green Republican Party	837	0.29
Total		286,347	100.00
Total votes		175,134	–
Registered voters/turnout		201,843	86.77
Source: Commission on Elections

==== 5th district ====
Pangasinan's 5th provincial district consists of the same area as Pangasinan's 5th legislative district. Two board members are elected from this provincial district.

Four candidates were included in the ballot.

Candidate	Party	Votes	%
Chinky Perez (incumbent)	Abante Pangasinan-Ilokano Party	161,522	36.23
Louie Sison (incumbent)	Abante Pangasinan-Ilokano Party	142,302	31.92
Jesus Basco	Lakas–CMD	82,713	18.55
Jen Gandia Garcia	Lakas–CMD	59,244	13.29
Total		445,781	100.00
Total votes		306,719	–
Registered voters/turnout		352,414	87.03
Source: Commission on Elections

==== 6th district ====
Pangasinan's 6th provincial district consists of the same area as Pangasinan's 6th legislative district. Two board members are elected from this provincial district.

Six candidates were included in the ballot.

Candidate	Party	Votes	%
Noel Bince (incumbent)	Abante Pangasinan-Ilokano Party	130,239	32.92
Salvador Perez Jr. (incumbent)	Abante Pangasinan-Ilokano Party	115,559	29.21
Rebecca Saldivar	Nacionalista	78,073	19.73
Ranjit Shahani	Lakas–CMD	35,123	8.88
Roland Fonacier	Independent	31,505	7.96
Reynaldo Sebastian	Independent	5,153	1.30
Total		395,652	100.00
Total votes		273,843	–
Registered voters/turnout		316,097	86.63
Source: Commission on Elections
