= Santa Lucia, Ilocos Sur =

Municipality in Ilocos Sur, Philippines

Santa Lucia
- Municipality
- Municipality of Santa Lucia
- Archdiocesan Shrine and Parish of Saint Lucy Welcome sign along MacArthur Highway Old municipal hall building

- Seal
- Nickname: Peanut Capital of Ilocos Sur
- Motto: Raniag Santa Lucia
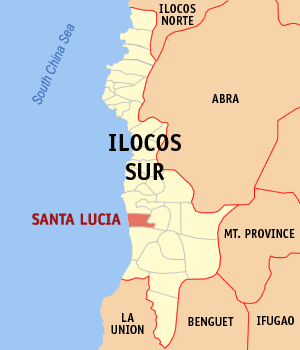
- Map of Ilocos Sur with Santa Lucia highlighted
- Interactive map of Santa Lucia
- Location within the Philippines
- Coordinates: 17°07′20″N 120°26′58″E
- Country: Philippines
- Region: Ilocos Region
- Province: Ilocos Sur
- District: 2nd district
- Named for: Saint Lucy
- Barangays: 36 (see Barangays)

Government
  - Type: Sangguniang Bayan
  - Mayor: Joseph Simon B. Valdez
  - Vice Mayor: Eduardo A. Toquero
  - Representative: Kristine Singson-Meehan
  - Municipal Council: Members: Corazon H. Rosal; Anneline B. Pimentel; Edwin R. Moreno; Rosendo H. Acosta Jr.; Narciso V. Garcia; Rex H. Costales; Ronald Q. Joven
  - Electorate: 17,621 voters (2025)

Area
  - Total: 49.72 km^{2} (19.20 sq mi)
- Elevation: 17 m (56 ft)
- Highest elevation: 120 m (390 ft)
- Lowest elevation: 0 m (0 ft)

Population (2024 census)
  - Total: 26,200
  - Density: 527/km^{2} (1,360/sq mi)
  - Households: 6,645

Economy
  - Income class: 1st municipal income class
  - Poverty incidence: 4.68% (2023)
  - Revenue: ₱ 853.3 million (2024)
  - Assets: ₱ 2,729 million (2024)
  - Expenditure: ₱ 312.2 million (2024)

Service provider
  - Electricity: Ilocos Sur Electric Cooperative (ISECO)
- Time zone: UTC+8 (PST)
- ZIP code: 2712
- PSGC: 0102925000
- IDD : area code: +63 (0)77
- Native languages: Ilocano; Tagalog
- Patron saint: Saint Lucy
- Website: www.santalucia.gov.ph

Santa Lucia, officially the Municipality of Santa Lucia (Ilocano: Ili ti Santa Lucia; Filipino: Bayan ng Santa Lucia), is a municipality in the province of Ilocos Sur, Philippines. According to the 2024 census, it has a population of 26,200 people.

The town celebrates the feast of its patroness, Saint Lucy, annually on December 13.

== Geography ==
The Municipality of Santa Lucia is bordered to the north by the city of Candon, Santa Cruz to the south, and Salcedo to the east.

Santa Lucia is situated 69.54 kilometres (43.21 mi) from the provincial capital Vigan, and 334.74 kilometres (208.00 mi) from the country's capital city of Manila.

=== Barangays ===
Santa Lucia is politically subdivided into 36 barangays. Each barangay consists of puroks and some have sitios.

- Alincaoeg
- Angkileng
- Arangin
- Ayusan (Poblacion)
- Banbanaba
- Bani
- Bao-as
- Barangobong (Poblacion)
- Buliclic
- Burgos (Poblacion)
- Cabaritan
- Catayagan
- Conconig East
- Conconig West
- Damacuag
- Luba
- Lubong
- Nagrebcan
- Nagtablaan
- Namatican
- Nangalisan
- Palali Norte
- Palali Sur
- Paoc Norte
- Paoc Sur
- Paratong
- Pila East
- Pila West
- Quinabalayangan
- Ronda
- Sabuanan
- San Juan
- San Pedro
- Sapang
- Suagayan
- Vical

=== Climate ===
Climate data for Santa Lucia, Ilocos Sur
Month	Jan	Feb	Mar	Apr	May	Jun	Jul	Aug	Sep	Oct	Nov	Dec	Year
Mean daily maximum °C (°F)	30 (86)	31 (88)	33 (91)	34 (93)	32 (90)	31 (88)	30 (86)	30 (86)	30 (86)	31 (88)	31 (88)	31 (88)	31 (88)
Mean daily minimum °C (°F)	20 (68)	21 (70)	23 (73)	25 (77)	26 (79)	26 (79)	25 (77)	25 (77)	25 (77)	23 (73)	22 (72)	21 (70)	24 (74)
Average precipitation mm (inches)	27 (1.1)	31 (1.2)	40 (1.6)	71 (2.8)	207 (8.1)	237 (9.3)	286 (11.3)	261 (10.3)	261 (10.3)	254 (10.0)	88 (3.5)	46 (1.8)	1,809 (71.3)
Average rainy days	9.4	9.3	12.7	17.0	25.4	26.8	27.4	26.1	25.0	21.0	15.5	10.6	226.2
Source: Meteoblue (modeled/calculated data, not measured locally)

== Demographics ==
Population census of Santa Lucia

Year	Pop.	±% p.a.
1903	7,882	—
1918	10,807	+2.13%
1939	8,998	−0.87%
1948	10,021	+1.20%
1960	12,197	+1.65%
1970	14,619	+1.83%

Year	Pop.	±% p.a.
1975	16,703	+2.71%
1980	17,344	+0.76%
1990	20,504	+1.69%
1995	20,341	−0.15%
2000	22,363	+2.05%
2007	23,872	+0.90%

Year	Pop.	±% p.a.
2010	24,981	+1.67%
2015	25,402	+0.32%
2020	25,966	+0.46%
2024	26,200	+0.22%

Source: Philippine Statistics Authority

In the 2024 census, Santa Lucia had a population of 26,200 people. The population density was 530 inhabitants per square kilometre (1,400/sq mi).

=== Language ===
Ilocano is the primary language of Santa Lucia.

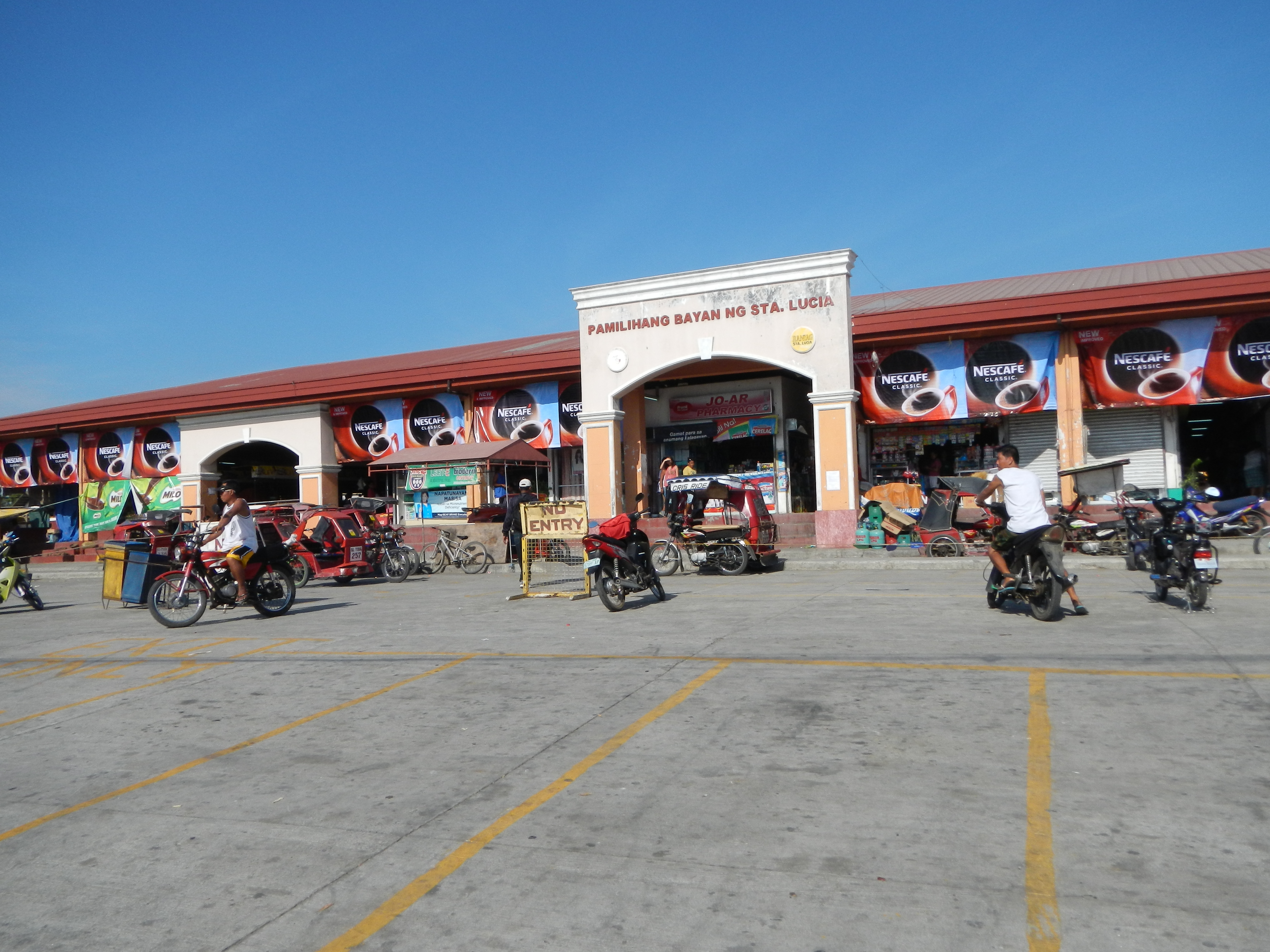
Public Market

== Economy ==
Poverty incidence of Santa Lucia (%)

Source: Philippine Statistics Authority

== Culture ==
=== Rambak Mani Festival ===
On 20 May 2024, Santa Lucia celebrated the 1st Rambak Mani Festival to promote its One Town, One Product — peanut industry. Governor Jerry Singson, Mayor Joseph Simon B. Valdez and Vice Mayor Eduardo A. Toquero graced the landmark festival.

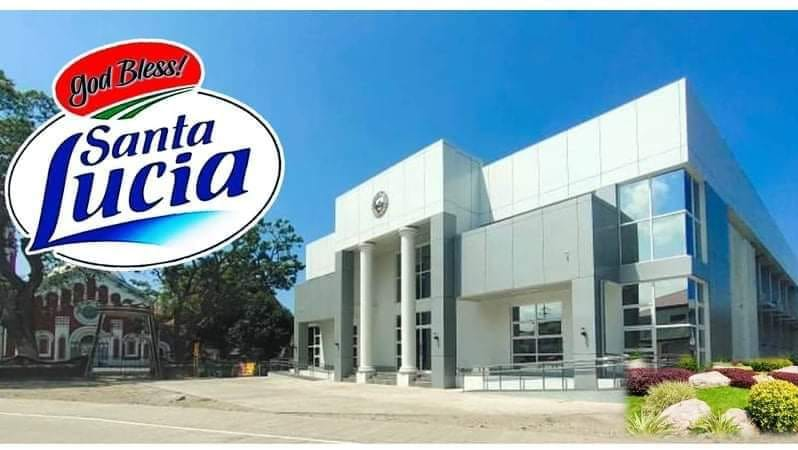
New Municipal Hall building

== Government ==
=== Local government ===
Santa Lucia, belonging to the second congressional district of the province of Ilocos Sur, is governed by a mayor designated as its local chief executive and by a municipal council as its legislative body in accordance with the Local Government Code. The mayor, vice mayor, and the councilors are elected directly by the people through an election which is being held every three years.

=== Elected officials ===
2025 - 2028
MAYOR	Joseph Simon "Bagyo" Basingil Valdez
Vice Mayor	Eduardo "Kitik" Andrada Toquero
Sangguniang Bayan Member	Kennette Basingil Valdez
Sangguniang Bayan Member	Gina Haduca-Hernaez
Sangguniang Bayan Member	Rosendo Habungan Acosta Jr.
Sangguniang Bayan Member	Alfredo Gaela Domisiw
Sangguniang Bayan Member	Narciso Verana Garcia
Sangguniang Bayan Member	Sotero Rosario Avila
Sangguniang Bayan Member	Mary Luz Hagoot Galleta
Sangguniang Bayan Member	Teodoro Cuello Angala

2022 - 2025
MAYOR	Joseph Simon "Bagyo" Basingil Valdez
Vice Mayor	Eduardo "Kitik" Andrada Toquero
Sangguniang Bayan Member	Edwin Rivera Moreno
Sangguniang Bayan Member	Anneline Bravo-Pimentel
Sangguniang Bayan Member	Corazon Halaman-Rosal
Sangguniang Bayan Member	Narciso Verana Garcia
Sangguniang Bayan Member	Rosendo Habungan Acosta Jr.
Sangguniang Bayan Member	Gina Haduca-Hernaez
Sangguniang Bayan Member	Alfredo Gaela Domisiw
Sangguniang Bayan Member	Rex Habon Costales

	2019 - 2022	2016 - 2019	2013 - 2016	2010 - 2013
MAYOR	Joseph Simon Basingil Valdez	Ferdinand Favis Hernaez	Estrella Favis Hernaez	Estrella Favis Hernaez
Vice Mayor	Douglas Favis Hernaez (July 1- Sept. 12, 2019) Eduardo Andrada Toquero (Sept. 12 - June 30, 2022)	Douglas Favis Hernaez	Ferdinand Favis Hernaez	Ferdinand Favis Hernaez
Sangguniang Bayan Member	Corazon Halaman-Rosal	Eduardo Andrada Toquero	Eduardo Andrada Toquero	Narciso Verana Garcia
Sangguniang Bayan Member	Anneline Bravo-Pimentel	Corazon Halaman Rosal	Douglas Favis Hernaez	Teodoro Cuello Angala
Sangguniang Bayan Member	Edwin Rivera Moreno	Simeon Rewarin Salgado	Ronald Quilop Joven	Rodolfo Fernandez Valdez
Sangguniang Bayan Member	Rosendo Habungan Acosta Jr.	Ronald Quilop Joven	Glicerio Galindo Rosal Jr.	Douglas Favis Hernaez
Sangguniang Bayan Member	Narciso Verana Garcia	Rodolfo Fernandez Valdez	Narciso Verana Garcia	Rex Habon Costales
Sangguniang Bayan Member	Rex Habon Costales	Anneline Valdez Bravo	Sotero Rosario Avila	Sotero Rosario Avila
Sangguniang Bayan Member	Ronald Quilop Joven	Teodoro Cuello Angala	Simeon Rewarin Salgado	Simeon Rewarin Salgado
Sangguniang Bayan Member	Gina Haduca-Hernaez	Rex Habon Costales	Rodolfo Fernandez Valdez	Anneline Valdez Bravo

	2007 - 2010	2004 - 2007
MAYOR	Ferdinand Favis Hernaez	Ferdinand Favis Hernaez
Vice Mayor	Estrella Favis Hernaez	Estrella Favis Hernaez
Sangguniang Bayan Member	Narciso Verana Garcia	Simeon Rewarin Salgado
Sangguniang Bayan Member	Allen Hernando Habon	Anneline Valdez Bravo
Sangguniang Bayan Member	Purificacion Herana Halabaso	Douglas Favis Hernaez
Sangguniang Bayan Member	Rex Habon Costales	Glicerio Galindo Rosal Jr.
Sangguniang Bayan Member	Sotero Rosario Avila	Jaime Carbonel Dela Pena
Sangguniang Bayan Member	Glicerio Galindo Rosal Jr.	Teodoro Cuello Angala
Sangguniang Bayan Member	Anneline Valdez Bravo	Allen Hernando Habon
Sangguniang Bayan Member	Eduardo Andrada Toquero	Rex Habon Costales

== Education ==
The Sta. Lucia Schools District Offices governs all educational institutions within the municipality. It oversees the operations of all private and public elementary and high schools.

=== Primary and elementary schools ===
Santa Lucia Catholic School

- Antero P. Hermosura Elementary Schoold
- Buliclic Elementary School
- Cabaritan Primary School
- Conconig Primary School
- Damacuag Elementary School
- Don Pedro Festejo Memorial School
- Luba Elementary School
- Francisco Gat-eb I Elementary School
- Palali Elementary School
- Paoc Elementary School
- Ronda Primary School
- Sabuanan Elementary School SPED Center
- Sta. Lucia North Central School
- Sta. Lucia South Central School

=== Secondary schools ===
- Nagtablaan National High School
- Palali National High School
- Santa Lucia Catholic School
- Sta. Lucia Academy
- Teodoro Hernaez National High School

== Gallery ==
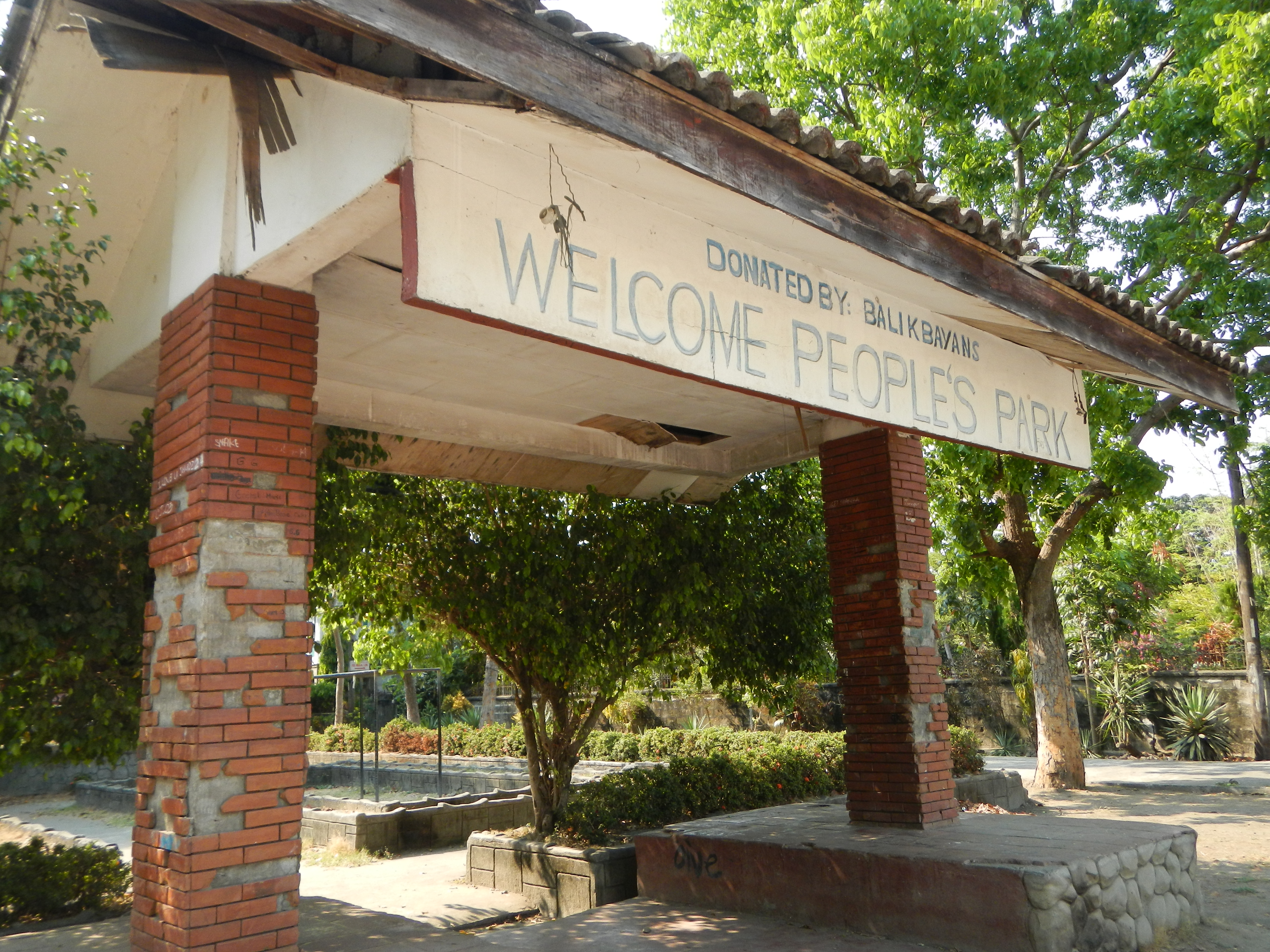
People's Park

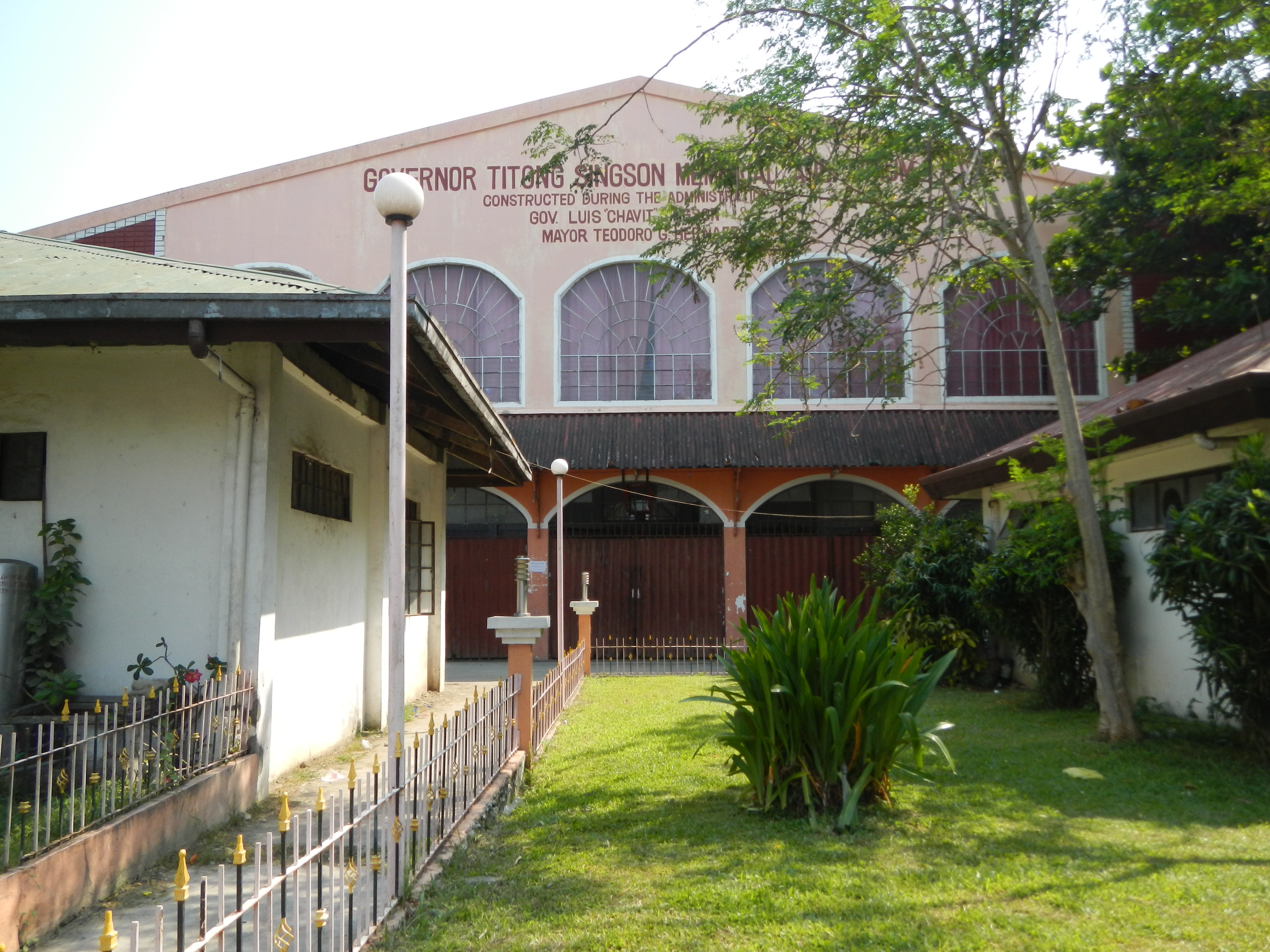
Evaristo "Titong" C. Singson Building

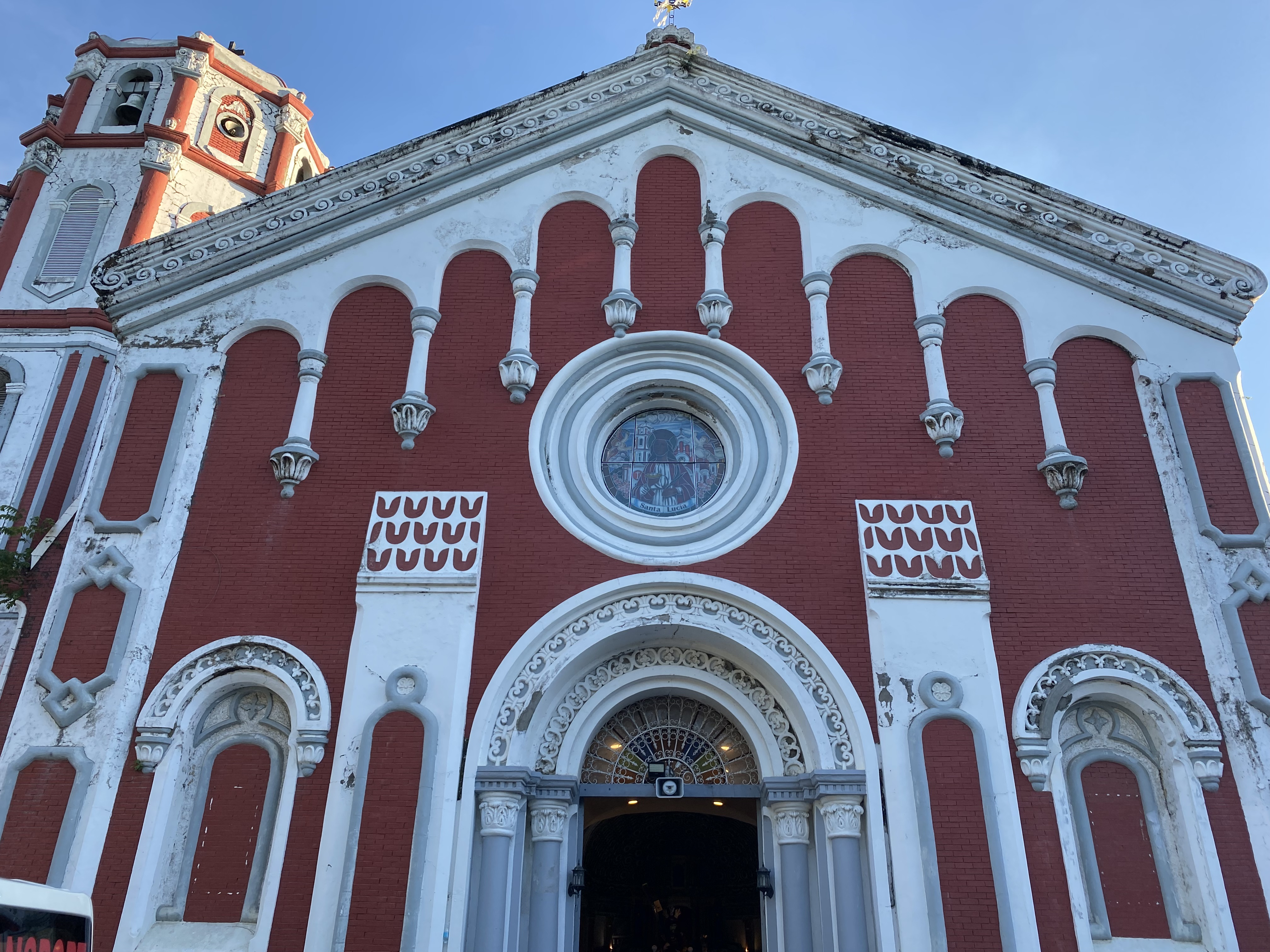
Santa Lucia Church façade in 2024

An ancestral house in Santa Lucia

Another ancestral house at the town center
