= LCS Holdings =

Philippine conglomerate

LCS Group of Companies
- Type: Private
- Industry: Conglomerate
- Founded: 2013; 13 years ago
- Founder: Luis Crisologo Singson
- Headquarters: Ascott Bonifacio Global City Manila, 5th Avenue cor. 28th Street, Bonifacio Global City, Taguig, Metro Manila, Philippines
- Area served: Asia
- Key people: Luis Crisologo Singson, Chairman; Richelle Singson, Vice Chairperson
- Subsidiaries: The Chavit Tree Project; Platinum Skies; Go Sport; Satrap Power; Satrap Mining; HalloHallo Skylark Lending; LCS Group Korea
- Website: www.lcsgroup.com.ph

The LCS Group of Companies, also known as LCS Holdings Inc., is a Philippine conglomerate. The company was founded in 2016 by Filipino politician Luis Crisologo Singson who serves as its chairman.

== Ventures ==
=== Aviation ===
The LCS Group operates a charter airline known as Platinum Skies, which was incorporated in 2013.

=== Energy and mining ===
Satrap Mining Corporation is a subsidiary under the LCS Group founded in 2014. It operates and manages renewable energy power plants mostly in Ilocos Sur. It also has a partnership with Philippine National Oil Company (PNOC) regarding the exploration of use of renewable energy for off-grid areas.

Satrap Mining Corporation is a subsidiary under the LCS Group engaged in mining. It was established in 2014.

=== Finance ===
Through HalloHallo Skylark Lending, Corp., the LCS Group runs a loaning service known as Casha.

=== Telecommunications ===
The LCS Group through Gracia Telecoms provides telecommunications services in Mindanao. In 2018, the LCS Group expressed interest to participate in a government-sanctioned bidding which would enable it to become the third major telecommunications provider in the Philippines alongside Globe Telecom and Smart–PLDT. The conglomerate formed a consortium called Sears Telecom with TierOne Communications International. TierOne is backed by Chinese firm Fujian Torch Electron Technology, Singaporean company Miller Pte. Ltd., and Cambodia-based Southeast Asia Telecom. The consortium touted itself as the only bidder planning to use satellite internet access by deploying portable Wi-Fi hotspots connected via satellite. LCS was not among the three entrants to the bidding, which was eventually won by Mislatel, which renamed themselves as Dito Telecommunity.

=== Events ===
The LCS Group spent $15 million to host the 2016 Miss Universe pageant in the Philippines in January 2017, around $12 million alone spent to secure the hosting rights from the Miss Universe Organization.
