= Deogracias Victor Savellano =

Filipino politician (1959–2025)

The Honorable Deogracias Victor B. Savellano
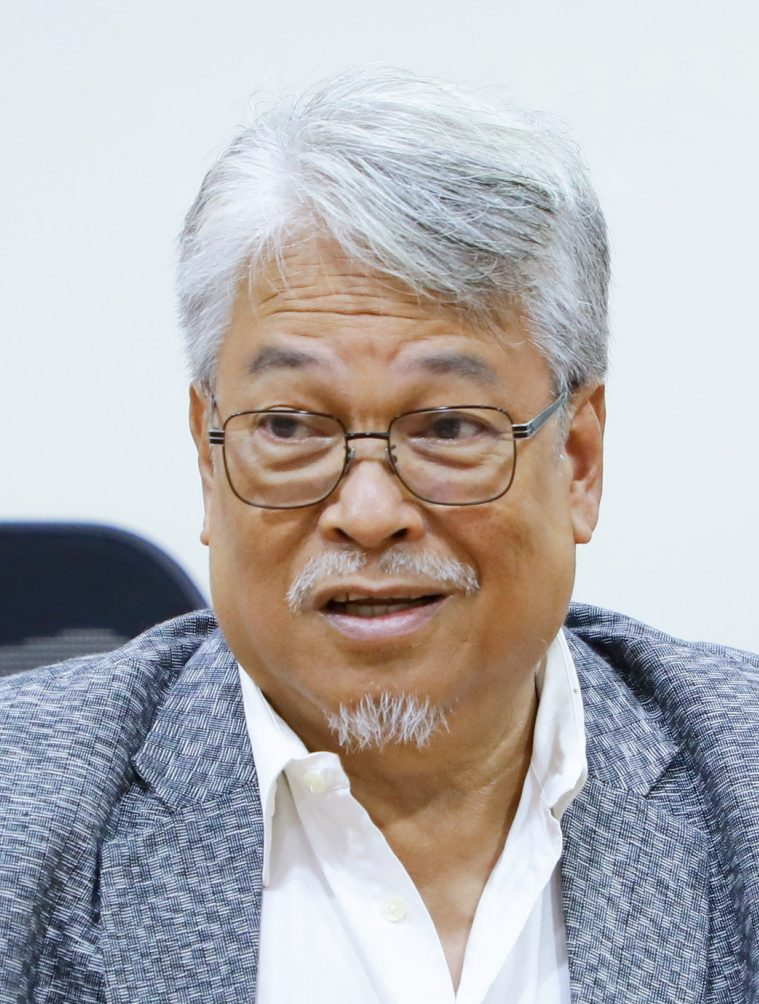
- Savellano in 2023

Undersecretary of Department of Agriculture
- In office July 31, 2023 – January 7, 2025
- President: Bongbong Marcos

Deputy Speaker of the House of Representatives of the Philippines
- In office August 13, 2019 – June 1, 2022
- House Speaker: Alan Peter Cayetano; Lord Allan Velasco

Member of the Philippine House of Representatives from Ilocos Sur's 1st district
- In office June 30, 2016 – June 30, 2022
- Preceded by: Ronald Singson
- Succeeded by: Ronald Singson

26th, 28th and 30th Governor of Ilocos Sur
- In office June 30, 2007 – June 30, 2010
- Vice Governor: Jerry Singson
- Preceded by: Chavit Singson
- Succeeded by: Chavit Singson
- In office June 30, 2001 – June 30, 2004
- Vice Governor: Jerry Singson
- Preceded by: Chavit Singson
- Succeeded by: Chavit Singson
- In office March 23, 1992 – June 30, 1992
- Preceded by: Mariano Trajon
- Succeeded by: Chavit Singson

Vice Governor of Ilocos Sur
- In office June 30, 2010 – June 30, 2016
- Governor: Chavit Singson (2010–2013); Ryan Luis Singson (2013–2016)
- Preceded by: Jerry Singson
- Succeeded by: Jerry Singson
- In office 1988 – March 23, 1992
- Governor: Mariano Trajon

Vice Mayor of Cabugao
- In office 1981–1987

Personal details
- Born: Deogracias Victor Barbers Savellano; November 25, 1959 Cabugao, Ilocos Sur, Philippines
- Died: January 7, 2025 (aged 65) Manila, Philippines
- Citizenship: Filipino
- Party: Nacionalista (2010–2025)
- Other political affiliations: Bileg (2018–2021); Lakas (2001–2010)
- Spouse: Dina Bonnevie (m. 2012)
- Parent(s): Victorino Savellano; Virginia Barbers
- Education: University of the Philippines Diliman
- Occupation: Politician

Deogracias Victor "DV" Barbers Savellano (November 25, 1959 – January 7, 2025) was a Filipino politician who last served as a member of the House of Representatives for Ilocos Sur's 1st district from 2016 to 2022. He was also one of the Deputy Speakers of the House of Representatives from 2019 to 2022.

== Early life and education ==
Savellano was born in Cabugao, Ilocos Sur on November 25, 1959. He was the son of Virginia Barbers, and the former mayor of Cabugao and former Chairman of the Commission on Elections (COMELEC) Victorino Savellano. His sister, Reina, operates Victorino's Restaurant in Quezon City, along with Heny Sison.

He earned a bachelor's degree in economics at University of the Philippines Diliman. He also studied at California, United States, where he obtained his master's degree.

== Political career ==
Savellano entered politics as the Vice Mayor of Cabugao from 1981 to 1987. He was also the 2-term Governor of Ilocos Sur in 1992, as well as from 2001 to 2004 and again from 2007 to 2010. He also served as the Vice Governor of the same province from 1988 to 1992, and again from 2010 to 2016.

He was first elected a member of the House of Representatives for Ilocos Sur's 1st congressional district in the 2016 election. He was re-elected in 2019 but was defeated by Ronald Singson in the 2022 election, Singson received 99,376 votes while Savellano received 73,503 votes.

On 13 August 2019, Savellano was appointed one of the Deputy Speakers of the House of Representatives.

On 31 July 2023, he was appointed by President Bongbong Marcos as undersecretary for livestock of the Department of Agriculture. He was also a concurrent oversight official of the National Tobacco Administration.

== Controversy ==
In October 2013, Savellano was charged for corruption allegations, along with Chavit Singson, who also served as the governor of Ilocos Sur. Both of them were criticised for reallocation of the usage of public funds for undefined projects in breach of Republic Act No. 3019. In July 2013, Savellano, along with Singson, were charged with graft by the Office of the Ombudsman following a 2002 complaint over the alleged misuse of financial assistance worth ₱26 million taken from Ilocos Sur’s share in the revenues from the national government’s tobacco excise tax during their governorships. However, both were acquitted by the Sandiganbayan in August 2014, citing the significant delay before the Ombudsman formally opened a preliminary investigation into the complaint in 2012.

On July 10, 2020, Savellano was one of the 70 representatives who voted to "yes" to deny the franchise renewal of ABS-CBN.

== Personal life and death ==
Savellano married actress Dina Bonnevie in 2012, and was the stepfather of actress Danica Sotto-Pingris and actor Oyo Boy Sotto. The couple met each other during shooting for the film Hanggang Saan, Hanggang Kailan in 1991.

Savellano died from an abdominal aneurysm in Manila, on January 7, 2025, at the age of 65. He was buried in Cabugao.

== Works ==
- Ilocos Sur: An Illustrated History (2009).

House of Representatives of the Philippines
Preceded by Ronald Singson	Member of the House of Representatives from Ilocos Sur's 1st district 2016–2022	Succeeded by Ronald Singson
Political offices
Preceded by Chavit Singson	Governor of Ilocos Sur; 2007–2010	Succeeded by Chavit Singson
Preceded by Chavit Singson	Governor of Ilocos Sur; 2001–2004	Succeeded by Chavit Singson
Preceded by Mariano Tajon	Governor of Ilocos Sur; 1992	Succeeded by Chavit Singson
Preceded by Jerry Singson	Vice Governor of Ilocos Sur; 2010–2016	Succeeded by Jerry Singson
