= Ronald Singson =

Filipino politician and businessman

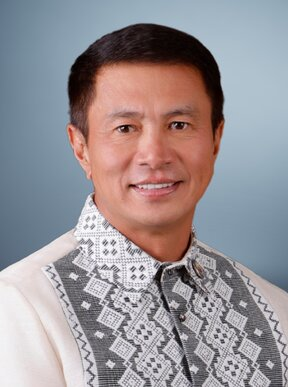
- Official portrait, 2026

Member of the Philippine House of Representatives from Ilocos Sur's 1st congressional district
- Incumbent
- Assumed office June 30, 2022
- Preceded by: Deogracias Victor B. Savellano
- In office June 30, 2013 – June 30, 2016
- Preceded by: Ryan Luis Singson
- Succeeded by: Deogracias Victor B. Savellano
- In office June 30, 2007 – March 7, 2011 (Note: Singson resigned after being convicted by the Wan Chai District Court for drug possession.)
- Preceded by: Salacnib Baterina
- Succeeded by: Ryan Luis Singson

Member of the Ilocos Sur Provincial Board from the 1st district
- In office June 30, 2001 – June 30, 2007

Personal details
- Born: November 18, 1968 (age 57) Manila, Philippines
- Party: NPC (2018–present); Bileg (local party; 2021–present)
- Other political affiliations: Nacionalista (2010–2018); Lakas (2001–2010)
- Relations: Chavit Singson (father); Ryan Luis Singson (brother); Randy Singson (brother)
- Profession: Businessman, concert producer

Ronald Verzosa Singson (born November 18, 1968) is a Filipino politician, businessman and philanthropist. He is the son of the patriarch of the Singson political clan Chavit Singson and Evelyn Verzosa-Singson. He is currently the representative of Ilocos Sur's first district in the 19th Congress, a position he holds since 2022. He previously served as the district's representative from 2007 to 2010, and again from 2013 to 2016.

== Political career ==
Singson was served as provincial board member from 2001 to 2007.

Singson was elected as representative of Ilocos Sur's first district during the 2007 local and national elections. He served in the 14th Congress from 2007 to 2010. Among his notable contributions is a bill granting additional benefits to employees and members of the judicial branch of the government.

Singson relaunched music channel Channel V Philippines in December 2009. Early in 2010, Singson later was linked to actress Lovi Poe, daughter of presidential candidate Fernando Poe, Jr. Singson also became a partner of Jomari Yllana in Fearless Production, a production outfit that produces live concerts.

Singson sought to defend his seat in the 2010 House of Representatives election against Beltran Baterina, winning in May 2010.

On July 9, 2010, Singson's production outfit co-produced Usher's concert at the SM Mall of Asia Concert Grounds, and was considering to bring Justin Bieber to the Philippines. In an earlier event, his company also funded the Cook-Archuelta concert held at the Mall Of Asia concert grounds.

In May 2013, Singson successfully regained his seat as representative of Ilocos Sur's first district, defeating political opponent Bertrand Baterina. In February 2014, Baterina filed a disqualification case against Singson before the Supreme Court of the Philippines, seeking to disqualify the latter in a desperate attempt to gain a congressional seat. However, the petition was later junked by the High Court due to lack of merit.

== Arrest in Hong Kong ==
In late July 2010, it was reported that Singson had been arrested on July 11 at the Hong Kong International Airport for allegedly possessing 26.1 grams (0.92 oz) of cocaine and 2 tablets of Valium. He refused to be helped by the Philippine consulate in Hong Kong, and on July 22, a judge denied him of bail on his arraignment. In August, the judge granted him bail worth HK$2 million (PHP12 million) after it was determined that the weight of the drugs seized on Singson was only 6.7 grams (0.24 oz). Representative Miro Quimbo observed the proceedings to compile a report to Congress.

In September, the court extended his bail due to him undergoing medical treatment; it also delayed Singson's plea bargaining on October. The judge then rescheduled the next hearings to November when the judge ordered Singson's lawyer to explain why a medical report would be necessary. After Singson admitted that the drugs seized were for his own personal use, his lawyers arranged him to plead guilty for drug possession; this was opposed by the prosecution that insisted that Singson was importing the drugs to Hong Kong.

After pleading guilty, Akbayan representative Walden Bello urged Speaker of the House of Representatives Feliciano Belmonte, Jr. to initiate expulsion proceedings against Singson. Majority floor leader Neptali Gonzales II maintained the House of Representatives' stand was to let the trial finish. In January 2011, Stanley Chan, the judge presiding Singson's trial stood down after receiving a letter with "prejudicial allegations" against Singson. His father Chavit remarked after the hearing that his son was "set up." Chavit later said that his son may be used as an example by the Chinese who are still angry on the Manila hostage crisis that led to the deaths of several Hong Kong residents in a bloody rescue attempt by the Manila Police District. Singson considered resigning from his House seat but urged other representatives to let the trial finish before judging him.

On February 23, 2011, judge Joseph Yau agreed with Singson that the drugs were for his own personal use, since that he did not need to traffic drugs to maintain a living considering he is a member of a wealthy family, although he contended that Singson overstated his level of drug use. Singson's lawyer proposed a sentence of less than two years.

Yau ruled that Singson was guilty of drug possession, sentencing him to two and a half years in prison, but reducing it by a year due to Singson pleading guilty, and his good personal background. Singson's family and Lovi Poe attending the sentencing; Chavit later said that they would not appeal the decision. On March 1, Singson resigned from the House of Representatives. The lower house accepted his resignation and declared a vacancy to his seat on March 7.

With the vacancy, the House of Representatives ordered the Commission on Elections to call a special election to fill Singson's seat. The commission subsequently scheduled the special election on May 28, where he was succeeded by his brother, Vigan Vice Mayor Ryan Luis Singson.

His father Chavit said a few weeks before Ronald's January 18, 2011 release that his son won't reenter politics and will instead focus on his businesses.

== Return to politics ==
Singson ran for his old House of Representatives seat for the 2013 elections; his brother Ryan instead contested Ilocos Sur's governorship, which was being held by their father Chavit, who did not run. He won and served one term until 2016, as he decided not to seek reelection. His party, Nacionalista Party, nominated former governor Deogracias Victor Savellano to defend his seat and won.

Singson switched party from Nacionalista to Nationalist People's Coalition and attempted a comeback to the same seat in 2019; however, he lost to Savellano. He ran again in 2022, being successful this time in defeating Savellano.
