= Chavit Singson =

Filipino politician and businessman (born 1941)

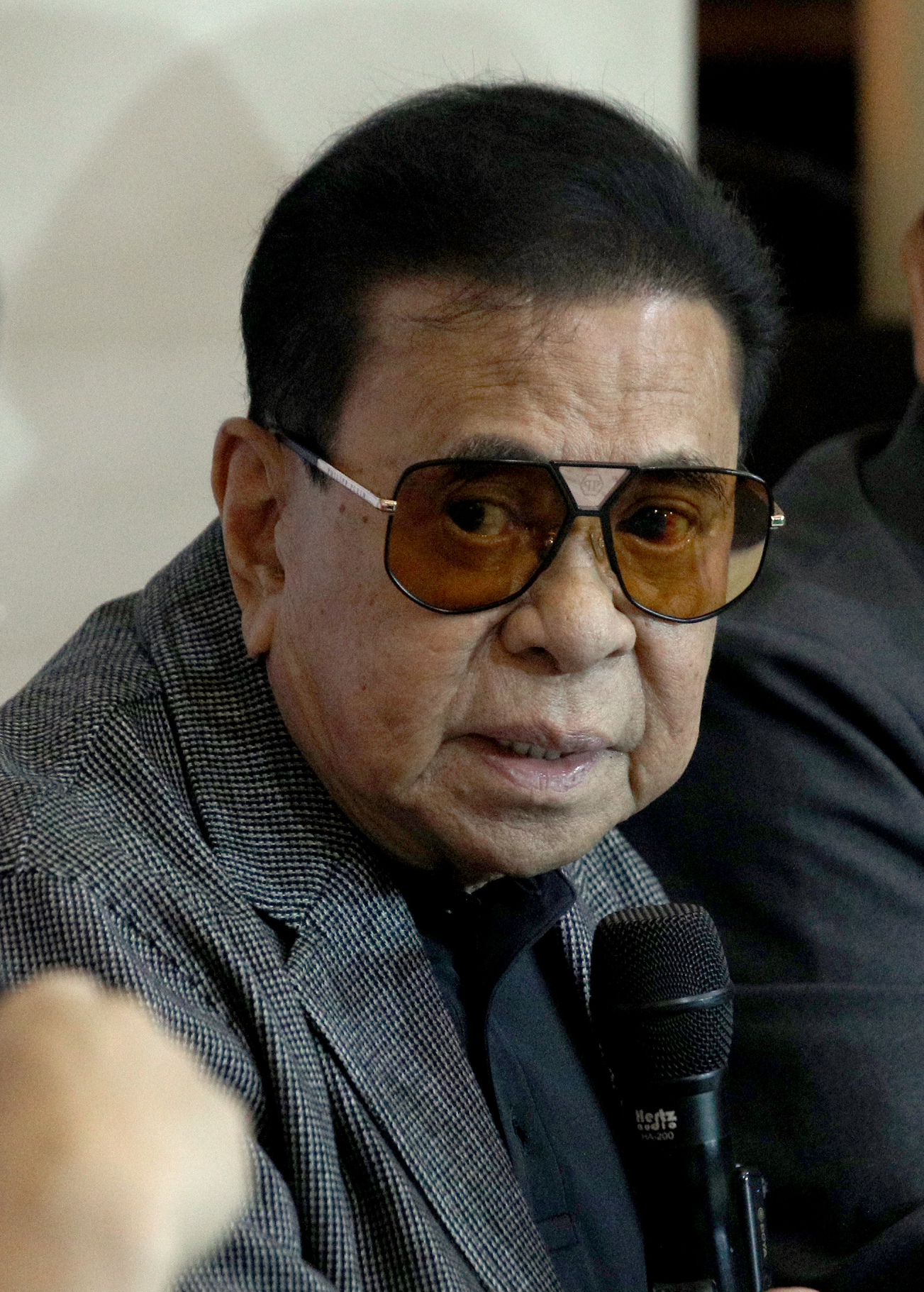
- Singson in 2026

Mayor of Narvacan, Ilocos Sur
- In office June 30, 2019 – June 30, 2022
- Vice Mayor: Pablito Sanidad Sr.
- Preceded by: Zuriel Zaragoza
- Succeeded by: Pablito Sanidad Sr.

Member of the Narvacan Municipal Council
- In office June 30, 2016 – June 30, 2019

20th, 27th, 29th and 31st Governor of Ilocos Sur
- In office June 30, 2010 – June 30, 2013
- Vice Governor: Deogracias Victor Savellano
- Preceded by: Deogracias Victor Savellano
- Succeeded by: Ryan Luis Singson
- In office June 30, 2004 – June 30, 2007
- Vice Governor: Deogracias Victor Savellano
- Preceded by: Deogracias Victor Savellano
- Succeeded by: Deogracias Victor Savellano
- In office June 30, 1992 – June 30, 2001
- Preceded by: Deogracias Victor Savellano
- Succeeded by: Deogracias Victor Savellano
- In office January 1, 1972 – March 26, 1986
- Preceded by: Carmen Crisologo
- Succeeded by: Jose G. Burgos Jr.

Member of the Philippine House of Representatives from Ilocos Sur's 1st congressional district
- In office June 30, 1987 – June 30, 1992
- Preceded by: Vacant; Post last held by Floro Crisologo
- Succeeded by: Mariano Tajon

Member of the Vigan City Council
- In office December 30, 1963 – December 30, 1971

Personal details
- Born: Luis Crisologo Singson; June 21, 1941 (age 85) Vigan, Ilocos Sur, Philippine Commonwealth
- Party: Independent (1986–1992; 2024–present); Bileg (local party; 2018–present)
- Other political affiliations: See list: NPC (2021–2024); Nacionalista (1971–1980; 2010–2021); Lakas–Kampi (2000–2010); LAMMP (1998–2000); LDP (1992–1998); KBL (1980–1987); Liberal (1963–1971)
- Spouse: Evelyn Verzosa (m. 1962; died 2016)
- Children: 24, including Ronald, Ryan Luis and Richelle
- Education: Colegio de San Juan de Letran (BComm)
- Occupation: Businessperson, politician

Luis "Chavit" Singson (Tagalog pronunciation: [ˈtʃabɪt ˈsiŋson]; born June 21, 1941) is a Filipino businessman and politician who last served as the mayor of Narvacan, Ilocos Sur from 2019 to 2022. He was also the governor of the province of Ilocos Sur, starting from 1972 until 1986, again from 1992 until 2001, again from 2004 to 2007, and again from 2010 until 2013. He was also the Deputy National Security Adviser for the Philippine government (2008).

Singson ran for senator under Team Unity in 2007, but lost.

== Early life ==
Chavit Singson was born on June 21, 1941, in Vigan, Ilocos Sur. He is second eldest among the seven children of José Singson y Sebastián and Caridad Crisólogo y Singson. He studied in Colegio de San Juan de Letran in Manila and finished his Commerce degree.

Both his paternal (Singson) and maternal (Crisólogo) families have dominated the political environment of the Ilocos region for generations. Although many members of both families, such as Chavit are related to one another, the two families have shared a bitter feud which reached its apex in the 1960s and 1970s, when shootings and political intimidation were rampant in the Ilocos region. Chavit considered his uncle, Floro Crisólogo as a mentor, but eventually had a severe falling out with his cousin and once-confidant Vincent Crisólogo who was Floro's son and there were many bloody encounters between the two. It is currently stated by both sides that tensions have eased.

== Role in the downfall of Joseph Estrada ==
In October 2000, Singson publicly accused his friend and then-President Joseph Estrada of plotting to assassinate him after a falling-out over the share of jueteng and tobacco revenues. He also confessed to being Estrada's personal collector of such revenues in Luzon. Singson's revelations helped trigger protests against Estrada, leading to his impeachment and overthrow in the Second EDSA Revolution in January 2001.

== Political career ==
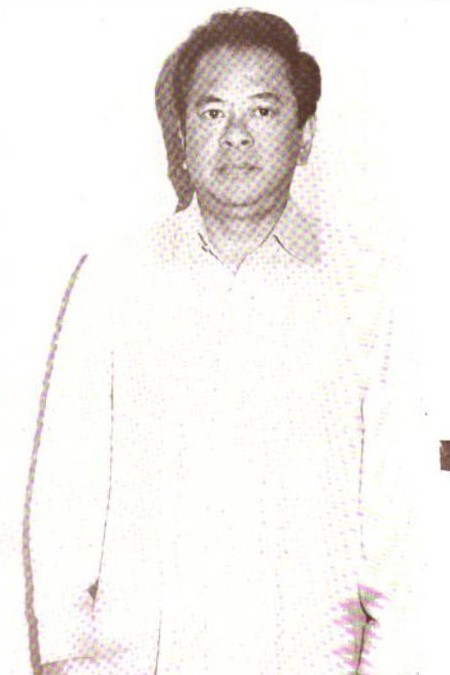
Singson official portrait during the 8th Congress.

Singson secured a spot as a candidate for the 2007 Philippine senatorial elections after siding with the administration of President Gloria Macapagal-Arroyo, despite being former friends with the former president Joseph Estrada. After losing the elections, Singson was appointed Deputy National Security Adviser on September 5, 2008, by Arroyo. He mended his friendship with Estrada sometime later. He was a member of Lakas–CMD until 2010.

In the 2010 Philippine presidential election he endorsed the Nacionalista presidential nominee Manny Villar and in the 2013 elections he supported the candidates of the United Nationalist Alliance.

Singson has served as governor of Ilocos Sur for multiple terms. From 2019 to 2022, he served as mayor of Narvacan under the local party Bileg Ti Ilokano.

Singson is also a longtime supporter of boxer Manny Pacquiao who was elected as senator in 2016. However, they had a falling out after Pacquiao pushed to increase the tobacco excise tax. Singson opposed Pacquiao's move saying that the tax increase would "kill" the tobacco industry, with his province Ilocos Sur being a major tobacco producer. Singson alleged that his unnamed "handlers" advised Pacquiao to project an image of someone who "isn't easily controlled by anyone" – by Pacquiao disassociating with Singson.

On June 19, 2021, Singson joined the Nationalist People’s Coalition. In October 2024, he filed his candidacy to run in the 2025 Philippine Senate election. On January 12, 2025, he withdrew his candidacy due to health concerns caused by pneumonia.

== Business career ==
Through his conglomerate LCS Group of Companies, Singson pledged to raise $11 million needed to host the Miss Universe 2016 pageant in the country on January 30, 2017, according to Tourism Secretary Wanda Teo. For the big event, which was to entail a budget of about $13-million, Singson had tapped possible sponsors including big hotels where the candidates and the Miss Universe entourage will be billeted. On October 8, the company filed its bid to become a third telecommunications provider in the Philippines.

In November 2018, Singson entered the Philippine automobile industry with Legado Motors Inc. (LMI), which is the exclusive distributor of GAC Motor vehicles.

Singson has expressed interest on acquiring the Miss Universe Organization (MUO) in January 2026. He claimed that Anne Jakrajutatip or Raul Rocha Cantú are no longer owners as they have a warrant of arrest against them. The MUO disputed Singson's statement stating that there was no ownership change.

== Involvement in sports ==
Presently, Singson is the president of the Philippine National Shooting Association, a local governing body for shooting sports in the country since 2018. Singson was also noted for his affiliation with professional boxer, Manny Pacquiao often accompanying him in trainings, press releases, and his fights. He was also involved in negotiations in securing a bout for Pacquiao with Floyd Mayweather Jr.

== Legal issues ==
In 2010, Singson sued Senator Miriam Defensor-Santiago for libel after the latter referred to him as a "jueteng lord" during a privilege speech in the Senate. The complaint was dismissed by the Office of the Ombudsman in February 2011, citing Santiago's parliamentary immunity.

In July 2013, Singson, along with Deogracias Victor Savellano, were charged with graft by the Office of the Ombudsman following a 2002 complaint over the alleged misuse of financial assistance worth ₱26 million taken from Ilocos Sur's share in the revenues from the national government’s tobacco excise tax during their governorships. However, both were acquitted by the Sandiganbayan in August 2014, citing the significant delay before the Ombudsman formally opened a preliminary investigation into the complaint in 2012.

In April 2024, Singson was fined ₱5,000 after his convoy was caught by Metropolitan Manila Development Authority (MMDA) inspectors traveling along a section of EDSA in Quezon City reserved for buses of the EDSA Carousel. In response, Singson apologized for the offense and paid the fine. He also offered ₱200,000 to the traffic inspectors who intercepted him as a reward for doing their duty, which was later received by the MMDA. However, the Civil Service Commission subsequently said that the MMDA's acceptance of the reward was a violation of ethics laws governing public employees.

Mug shot of Singson after his arrest by the Philippine National Police on June 11, 2026.

In 2026, Singson was arrested on charges of cyberlibel.

== Personal life ==
Singson was first married to Evelyn Verzosa Singson. He has a son with Evelyn, Ryan Luis Singson who is also a politician. The couple, which later separated, had six other children. Evelyn died in March 2016.

He also had model Rachel Tiongson as his common-law wife with whom he has five children. Their relationship ended in 2009 after Tiongson was beaten up by Singson after she allegedly had an affair with another man although Tiongson claimed they have been estranged since November 2008.

In 2012, Singson introduced Josephine Pintor, who is 44 years younger than him, to the public as his new partner. He revealed that he had begun the relationship with Pintor when she was 14 years old and he was 58, which raised serious concerns because Pintor was a minor at the time. Singson revealed his youngest child, a daughter born in 2014 or 2015, presumably with another partner, to the public in an online show on Facebook Live in 2020.

Singson does trophy hunting as a hobby. He established in the Baluarte Zoo in Vigan after his game collection grew large. He keeps taxidermized remains of some of the animals he hunted at the Safari Gallery in Baluarte.
