= Jerry Singson =

Filipino politician

The Honorable Jeremias "Jerry" C. Singson KGCR
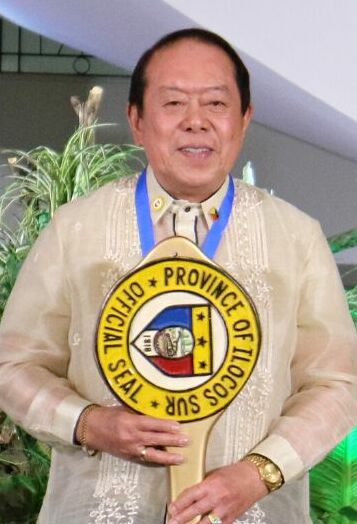
- Singson in 2022

33rd Governor of Ilocos Sur
- Incumbent
- Assumed office June 30, 2022
- Vice Governor: Ryan Luis Singson
- Preceded by: Ryan Luis Singson

Vice Governor of Ilocos Sur
- In office June 30, 2016 – June 30, 2022
- Governor: Ryan Luis Singson
- Preceded by: Deogracias Victor Savellano
- Succeeded by: Ryan Luis Singson
- In office June 30, 2007 – June 30, 2010
- Preceded by: Deogracias Victor Savellano
- Succeeded by: Jerry Singson
- In office June 30, 2001 – June 30, 2004
- Succeeded by: Deogracias Victor Savellano

Member of the Ilocos Sur Provincial Board from the 1st district
- In office June 30, 2004 – June 30, 2007
- In office June 30, 1995 – June 30, 2001

Vice Mayor of Vigan
- In office February 2, 1988 – June 30, 1995

Personal details
- Born: September 15, 1948 (age 78) Vigan, Ilocos Sur, Philippines
- Party: NPC (2004–2007, 2021–present); Bileg (local party; 2018–present)
- Other political affiliations: Nacionalista (2016–2021); Lakas (until 2004, 2007–2016)
- Spouse: Marilou Tongson (m. 1968)
- Relations: Ryan Luis Singson (nephew) Ronald Singson (nephew); Evaristo “Titong” Singson†(brother); Bernardo “Dodie” Singson† (brother); Fernando “Dodoy” Singson† (brother); Ma. Livia “Honey Girl” Singson† (sister); Germelina “Germie" Singson; Jose “Bonito” Singson Jr. (brother); Luis “Chavit” Singson (brother)
- Children: Evaristo "Bobit" Singson III; Jeremias "Jay-Jay" Singson; John Patrick "Jay-Pee" Singson†
- Education: University of Santo Tomas

Jeremias "Jerry" Crisologo Singson, KGCR (born September 15, 1948) is the incumbent governor of Ilocos Sur. He was also considered as “Father of Day Care Center and Medical Mission” for his strong advocacy for child-friendly day care centers and series of medical missions throughout the province of Ilocos Sur.

He served as Vigan Vice Mayor in 1988-1995, Senior Provincial Board Member in 1995-1998, Board Member in 1998-2001, Vice Governor in 2001-2004, Board Member in 2004-2007, and Vice Governor in 2007-2010 and in 2016-2022.

== Early life ==
Jerry Singson was born on September 15, 1948, to Jose “Maestro Seling” Sebastian Singson (Vigan Mayor in 1967-71) and the Caridad Singson Crisologo. He was the sixth among the eight children that include the late Governor Evaristo “Titong”, Luis “Chavit”, Bernardo “Dodie”, Fernando “Dodoy”, Ma. Livia “Honey Girl”, Germelina “Germie” and Jose “Bonito” Jr.

== Education ==
Jerry Singson spent his grade school years at the St. Paul College of Vigan when it was still known as Rosary College. His altar boy days extended to a life at the Immaculate Conception Minor Seminary and he completed his secondary education at the Divine Word College of Vigan (DWCV). He studied college at the University of Santo Tomas and again at the Divine Word College of Vigan.

== Family ==
On March 2, 1968, Jerry Singson married Marilou Tongson Ancheta, daughter of the popular Dr. Susano Ancheta, a multi-term Vigan councilor, and Asuncion Corpuz Tongson of Vigan. They have three sons – Evaristo III “Bobit” (spouse: Liezl Marie Barba), Jeremias Jr. “Jay-Jay” (Jhoanna Irynn Gabo) and John Patrick “Jay-Pee” (Elizabeth Ann Lim).

== Private Sector ==
Jerry Singson worked as manager of the Lyric Theater of his parents until he inherited the movie house. He became a young businessman engaged in tobacco trading while he also studied BSC-Accounting at the DWCV.

== Political career ==
Jerry Singson served as Vigan Vice Mayor in 1988-1995, Senior Provincial Board Member in 1995-1998, Board Member in 1998-2001, Vice Governor in 2001-2004, Board Member in 2004-2007, and as second-time Vice Governor in 2007-2010.

As a political leader, among his past advocacies and projects include the Ubbog ti Biag (spring of life) Water Spring Development Projects province wide, particularly upland municipalities with mostly tribal communities; Justly-Compensated Sponsorship (JCS) for the Day Care Workers in January 2005; chairs and tables for 724 day care centers throughout Ilocos Sur; Jeopardizing Common Sickness (JCS) During Rainy Season in June 2005; Jordan River-like Cure to the Skin Disease in Support to Leprosy Elimination Campaign (LEC) of the Skin Clinic of the Department of Health Center for Health Department – Center (Jeremias “Jerry” Singson in Support to LEC) in July 2005.

His leadership skills as a Provincial Board Member were used in the following various Committee Chairmanships: July 1- 2001 – June 20, 2004 – Social Services, Health and Sanitation, Information, Media and Public Affairs; July 1, 1998 – June 20, 2001 – Finance and Appropriation, Social Services, Health and Sanitation; July 1, 1995 – June 30, 1998 – Finance and Appropriation, Ways and Means.

As second-time Vice Governor, his top advocacy is the Ilocos Sur Hotline as a frontline aksyon agad public service every Saturday morning through radio station DWRS Commando Radio with Governor Deogracias Victor “DV” B. Savellano other provincial government officials.

== Socio-Civic ==
After his two eldest brothers Evaristo “Titong” and Luis “Chavit” won as the Vigan mayor and Ilocos Sur governor in the 1971 elections, respectively, Vice Governor Jerry served as the Barangay Captain of Pagpartian-Pagpandayan in 1975-1988, starting a long career in public service.

Vice Governor Jerry transformation into a politician was preceded by youth and civic leadership, starting as the Founder and Controller of the Hunters (youth) Organization in 1969-1979 with initiation rites as a requirement for membership for boys and girls who were mostly high school and college students. In 1970-1971, he served as President of the Vigan Tennis Club. When he was the President of the Vigan “Diego Silang” Jaycees in 1978-1979, he spearheaded the First Jaycee World Motorcycle Races in Vigan on November 4–8, 1978 that drew an unprecedented large number of foreign participants and tourists.

In 1988-1989, when he was the Vigan Vice Mayor, he also served as the President of the Rotary Club of Metro Vigan. His longest exposure in civic service is with the Knights of Rizal, as Area Commander in 1992, Supreme Trustee in 2000-2001, Area Commander for Northern Luzon in 2001-2006, and Supreme Auditor, 2006 to the present. He is also the Chairman of the Council of Elders of the Immaculate Conception Minor Seminary Alumni Foundation in 2002 to the present. He was also Council Chairman of the Boy Scouts of the Philippines – Ilocos Sur Chapter in 1996-1998. From 2005 to the present, he serves as the Official Representative Designate of the Joint Enforcement & Monitoring Committee to Implement the GRP-RPM-P-RPA/ABB Peace Agreement.

On May 14, 2007, right after the elections, the new administration headed by newly elected Governor Deogracias Victor “DV” Savellano and the Sangguniang Panlalawigan officials embarked on a series of medical missions spearheaded by Vice Governor Jeremias “Jerry” C. Singson. These started in the upland town of Cervantes on May 31 in partnership with the Philippine Charity Sweepstakes Office (PCSO), that contributed all medicines needed in the medical mission, and thus gave birth to the Joint Community Services Medical Mission (JCSMM). The JCSMM conducted monthly medical-dental missions, cataract missions, and quarterly major surgical missions in cooperation with the Philippine Amusement Gaming Corporation (PAGCOR), Lungsod ng Kabataan, Madrigal Foundation of the young philanthropist Ms. Lalaine Madrigal, Ilocos Surian Association of Hawaii, and various civic and overseas organizations.

== Affiliations and Recognitions ==
His multifarious political affiliations are: President, Vice Mayors’ League of Ilocos Sur (1988–1995); Vice President for Luzon, Vice Mayors’ League of the Philippines (1988–1990); Executive Vice President, Vice Mayors’ League of the Philippines (1990–1992); President, Provincial Board Members League of Region I (1995–1996); Vice President for Luzon, Vice Governors’ League of the Philippines (2001–2004); National Chairman, Vice Governors’ League of the Philippines (2007–2010).

From his numerous citations and plaques of recognition, the most recent is the medal of excellence conferred on him by the Quirino Medalist Association on November 17, 2008 (118th birth anniversary celebration of President Elpidio Quirino) for outstanding Ilocanos in recognition of their leadership and service to the Ilocano people.

Singson was also Supreme Commander of the Order of the Knights of Rizal and was conferred the highest rank, Knight Grand Cross of Rizal (KGCR).

Political offices
Preceded by Ryan Luis Singson	Governor of Ilocos Sur; 2022–present	Incumbent
Preceded by Deogracias Victor Savellano	Vice Governor of Ilocos Sur; 2016–2022	Succeeded by Ryan Luis Singson
Preceded by Deogracias Victor Savellano	Vice Governor of Ilocos Sur; 2007–2010	Succeeded by Deogracias Victor Savellano
New title	Vice Governor of Ilocos Sur; 2001–2004	Succeeded by Deogracias Victor Savellano
