= Ilocos Sur Provincial Board =

Legislative body of the province of Ilocos Sur, Philippines

Ilocos Sur Provincial Board Sangguniang Panlalawigan ng Ilocos Sur

Type
- Type: Unicameral
- Term limits: 3 terms (9 years)

Leadership
- Presiding Officer: Ryan Luis Singson, Bileg Ti Ilokano since June 30, 2022

Structure
- Seats: 14 board members 1 ex officio presiding officer
- Political groups: Bileg (10) TBD (1) Nonpartisan (3)
- Length of term: 3 years
- Authority: Local Government Code of the Philippines

Elections
- Voting system: Multiple non-transferable vote (regular members); Indirect election (ex officio members); Acclamation (sectoral member)
- Last election: May 12, 2025
- Next election: May 15, 2028

Meeting place
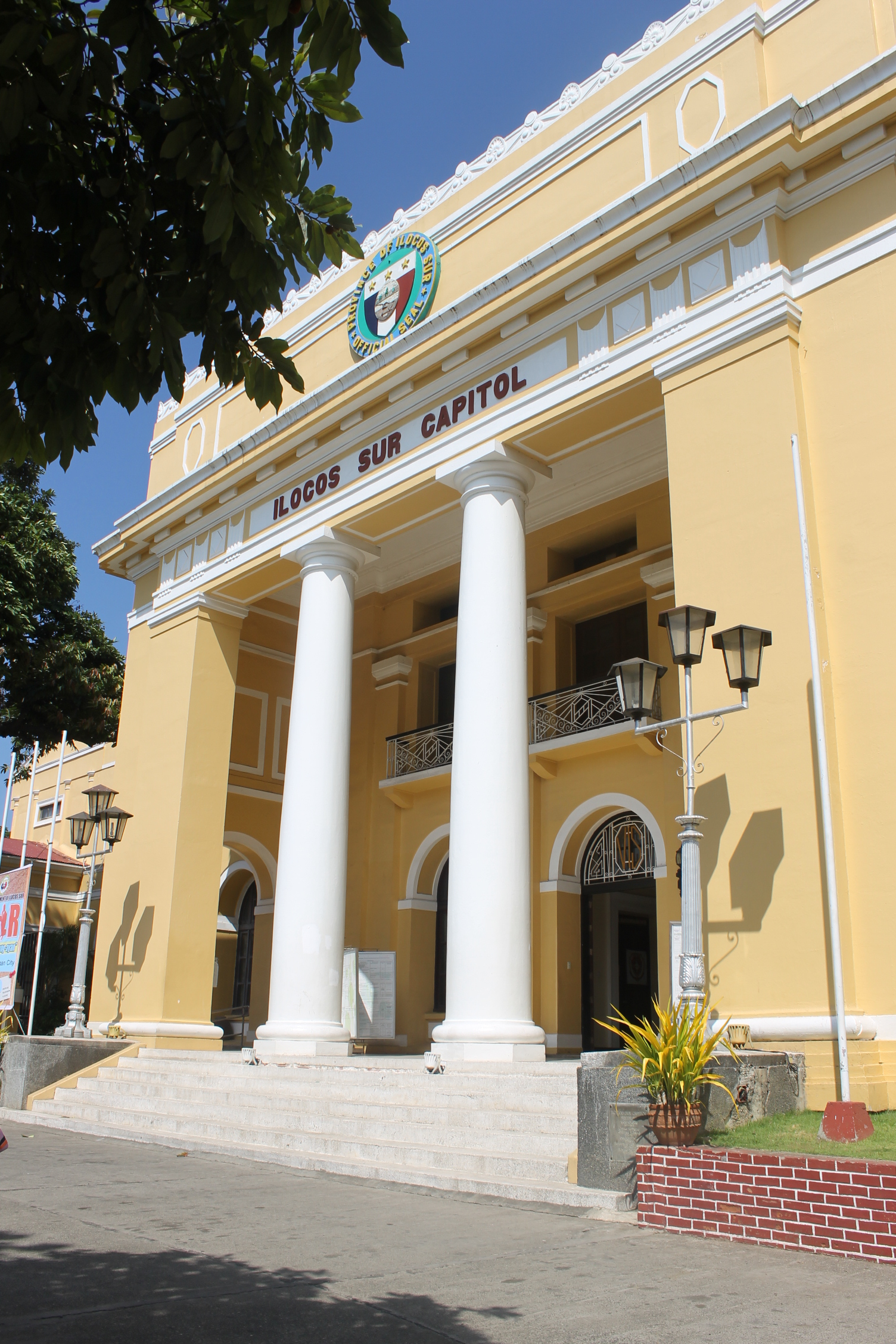
- Ilocos Sur Capitol, Vigan

The Ilocos Sur Provincial Board is the Sangguniang Panlalawigan (provincial legislature) of the Philippine province of Ilocos Sur.

The members are elected via plurality-at-large voting: the province is divided into two districts, each having five seats. A voter votes up to five names, with the top five candidates per district being elected. The vice governor is the ex officio presiding officer, and only votes to break ties. The vice governor is elected via the plurality voting system province-wide.

The districts used in appropriation of members is coextensive with the legislative districts of Ilocos Sur.

Aside from the regular members, the board also includes the provincial federation presidents of the Liga ng mga Barangay (ABC, from its old name "Association of Barangay Captains"), the Sangguniang Kabataan (SK, youth councils) and the Philippine Councilors League (PCL). Ilocos Sur's provincial board also has a reserved seat for its indigenous people (IPMR).

== Apportionment ==
Elections	Seats per district		Ex officio seats	Reserved seats	Total seats
Elections	1st	2nd	Ex officio seats	Reserved seats	Total seats
2010–2019	5	5	3	—	13
2019–present	5	5	3	1	14

== List of members ==
=== Current members ===
These are the members after the 2025 local elections and 2023 barangay and SK elections

- Vice Governor: Ryan Luis Singson (Bileg)

Seat	Board member	Party	Start of term	End of term
1st district	Janina Carine M. Fariñas	Bileg	June 30, 2025	June 30, 2028
1st district	Art Constantine U. Oandasan	Bileg	June 30, 2022	June 30, 2028
1st district	Francisco Arturo O. Ranches III	Bileg	June 30, 2022	June 30, 2028
1st district	Reymark A. Rafanan	Bileg	June 30, 2022	June 30, 2028
1st district	Ismael R. Baterina	Bileg	June 30, 2025	June 30, 2028
2nd district	Ericson G. Singson	Bileg	June 30, 2022	June 30, 2028
2nd district	Benjamin N. Maggay	Bileg	June 30, 2019	June 30, 2028
2nd district	Fayinna Pilar S. Zaragoza	Bileg	June 30, 2025	June 30, 2028
2nd district	Leopoldo G. Gironella Jr.	Bileg	June 30, 2022	June 30, 2028
2nd district	Pablito F. Sanidad Jr.	Bileg	June 30, 2019	June 30, 2028
ABC	Constante Benzon	Nonpartisan	January 12, 2024	January 1, 2026
PCL	TBD			June 30, 2028
SK	Victor Singson	Nonpartisan	November 25, 2023	January 1, 2026
IPMR	Elpidio Quines	Nonpartisan	September 17, 2019	September 17, 2025

=== Vice Governor ===
Election year	Name	Party	Ref.
2016	Jerry Singson	Nacionalista	
2019	Jerry Singson	Bileg	
2022	Ryan Luis Singson	Bileg	
2025	Ryan Luis Singson	Bileg	

=== 1st District ===
- Population (2024):

Election year	Member (party)	Member (party)	Member (party)	Member (party)	Member (party)	Ref.
2016	Mikaela Karita Singson Mendoza Ortega (Nacionalista)	Christopher Abraham R. Baterina (Nacionalista)	Constante T. Oandasan (Nacionalista)	Ronnie R. Rapanut (Independent)	Efren Rafanan, Sr. (KBL)	
2019	Mikaela Karita Singson Mendoza Ortega (Bileg)	Christopher Abraham R. Baterina (Bileg)	Constante T. Oandasan (Bileg)	Ronnie R. Rapanut (Bileg)	Efren Rafanan, Sr. (Bileg)	
2022	Francisco Arturo O. Ranches III (NPC)	Christopher Abraham R. Baterina (Bileg)	Art Constantine U. Oandasan (Bileg)	Ronnie R. Rapanut (Bileg)	Efren Rafanan, Sr. (KBL)	
2025	Francisco Arturo O. Ranches III (Bileg)	Janina Carine M. Fariñas (Bileg)	Art Constantine U. Oandasan (Bileg)	Ismael R. Baterina (Bileg)	Reymark A. Rafanan (Bileg)	

=== 2nd District ===
- Population (2024):

Election year	Member (party)	Member (party)	Member (party)	Member (party)	Member (party)	Ref.
2016	Jaime Singson (Liberal)	Joselle F. Gironella (Nacionalista)	Pablito F. Sanidad, Jr. (Nacionalista)	Gina Cordero (Nacionalista)	Mildred M. Elaydo (Nacionalista)	
2019	Jaime Singson (Bileg)	Benjamin N. Maggay (Bileg)	Pablito F. Sanidad, Jr. (Bileg)	Gina Cordero (Bileg)	Mildred M. Elaydo (Bileg)	
2022	Ericson G. Singson (NPC)	Benjamin N. Maggay (NPC)	Leopoldo G. Gironella, Jr. (NPC)	Gina Cordero (NPC)	Mildred M. Elaydo (NPC)	
2025	Ericson G. Singson (Bileg)	Benjamin N. Maggay (Bileg)	Leopoldo G. Gironella, Jr. (Bileg)	Pablito F. Sanidad, Jr. (Bileg)	Fayinna Pilar S. Zaragoza (Bileg)	
