= Ryan Luis Singson =

Filipino politician (born 1980)

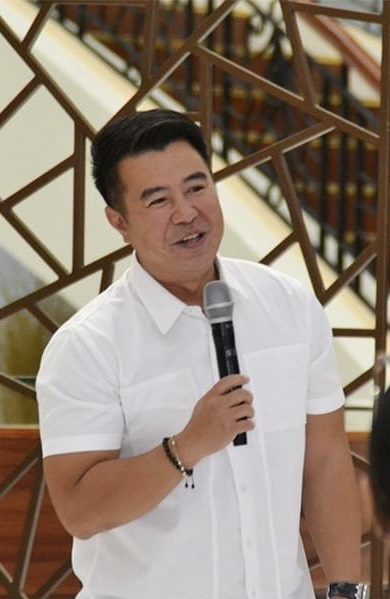
- Singson in 2022

Vice Governor of Ilocos Sur
- Incumbent
- Assumed office June 30, 2022
- Governor: Jerry Singson
- Preceded by: Jerry Singson

32nd Governor of Ilocos Sur
- In office June 30, 2013 – June 30, 2022
- Vice Governor: Deogracias Victor Savellano (2013–2016); Jerry Singson (2016–2022)
- Preceded by: Chavit Singson
- Succeeded by: Jerry Singson

President of League of Provinces of the Philippines
- In office July 24, 2016 – June 30, 2019
- Succeeded by: Presbitero Velasco Jr.

Member of the Philippine House of Representatives from Ilocos Sur's 1st District
- In office May 30, 2011 – June 30, 2013
- Preceded by: Ronald V. Singson
- Succeeded by: Ronald V. Singson

Personal details
- Born: June 1, 1980 (age 46) San Juan, Philippines
- Party: Lakas (2023–present); Bileg (local party; 2018–present)
- Other political affiliations: Nacionalista (2012–2023); Biled (2011–2012)
- Spouse: Patch Savellano
- Relations: Ronald Singson (brother); Chavit Singson (father)
- Children: Elise Singson; Rylus Singson; Ryker Singson
- Education: De La Salle–College of Saint Benilde

Ryan Luis Verzosa Singson (born June 1, 1980) is a Filipino politician who has served as the Vice Governor of Ilocos Sur since 2022. He previously served as Governor from 2013 to 2022, and as the representative of the 1st district of Ilocos Sur from 2011 to 2013.

== Early life ==
Singson was born on June 1, 1980, in San Juan, Metro Manila, Philippines.

== Political career ==
Singson's political career began with his election as representative of the 1st district of Ilocos Sur in a special election in 2011, succeeding his brother Ronald Singson who resigned after a drug possession conviction in Hong Kong. He did not seek re-election to Congress in 2013, opting instead to run for Governor of Ilocos Sur, a position he won.

On July 24, 2016, Ryan Luis Singson was elected president of the LPP.

After serving as president of the League of Provinces of the Philippines for three years, Marinduque Governor Presbitero Velasco Jr. succeeded him. Velasco is a former Associate Justice. Singson is a son of former Ilocos Sur Governor Chavit Singson, and his brother Ronald Singson is a current member of the House of Representatives of the Philippines.
