= Governor of Ilocos Sur =

Local chief executive

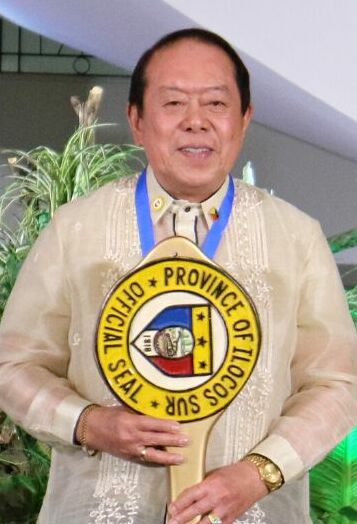
- Incumbent; Jerry Singson since June 30, 2022
- Residence: Ilocos Sur Provincial Capitol
- Term length: 3 years
- Inaugural holder: Mena Crisologo
- Formation: 1818 (Spanish era), 1901 (American era)

The governor of Ilocos Sur (Filipino: Punong Panlalawigan ng Ilocos Sur), is the chief executive of the provincial government of Ilocos Sur.

== List of governors of Ilocos Sur ==
| No. | Image | Governor | Term |
|---|---|---|---|
| 1 | | Mena Crisologo | 1901-1906 |
| 2 | | Félix Angco | 1906-1908 |
| 3 | | Estanislao Reyes | 1908-1909 |
| 4 | | Manuel Singson | 1910-1912 |
| 5 | | Juan Villamor | 1912-1916 |
| 6 | | José Villanueva y Florendo | 1916-1919 |
| 7 | | Simeón Ramos | 1919-1925 |
| 8 | | Alberto Reyes | 1925-1928 |
| 9 | | Alejandro Quirolgico | 1928-1931 |
| 10 | | Lupo Biteng | 1931-1932 |
| 11 | | Alejandro Quirolgico | 1933-1936 |
| 12 | | Pedro Singson Reyes | 1937-1941 |
| 13 | | Pascual Pimentel | 1943-1945 |
| 14 | | Sixto Brillantes | 1945-1946 |
| 15 | | Perfecto Faypon | 1946-1952 |
| 16 | | Eliseo Quirino | 1952-1955 |
| 17 | | Pedro Singson Reyes | 1956-1959 |
| 18 | | Godofredo S. Reyes | 1960-1963 |
| 19 | | Carmen "Carmeling" P. Crisologo | 1964-1971 |
| 20 | | Luis "Chavit" Singson | 1972-1986 |
| 21 | | Jose G. Burgos Jr. | 1986-1987 |
| 22 | | Antonio "Yeng" Abaya | 1987 |
| 23 | | Anita Lorenzana | 1987-1988 |
| 24 | | Evaristo "Titong" C. Singson | 1988 |
| 25 | | Mariano M. Tajon | 1989-1992 |
| 26 | | Deogracias Victor Savellano | 1992 |
| 27 | | Luis "Chavit" Singson | 1992-2001 |
| 28 | | Deogracias Victor Savellano | 2001-2004 |
| 29 | | Luis "Chavit" Singson | 2004-2007 |
| 30 | | Deogracias Victor Savellano | 2007-2010 |
| 31 | | Luis "Chavit" Singson | 2010-2013 |
| 32 | | Ryan Luis Singson | 2013-2022 |
| 33 | | Jeremias C. Singson | 2022–present |
