= Bileg Party =

Political party in the Philippines

Bileg Party Bileg Ti Ilokano
- Founder: Chavit Singson
- Founded: 2018
- Ideology: Regionalism
- National affiliation: HNP (2018–2019)
- House of Representatives (Ilocos Sur seats): 2 / 2
- Provincial Governor: 1 / 1
- Provincial Vice Governor: 1 / 1
- Board Members: 10 / 14

The Bileg Party (Ilocano: Bileg Ti Ilokano; lit. 'Ilocano Power'), also known as BILEG, is a local political party in Ilocos Sur.

In the 2019 elections, the party forged an alliance with Hugpong ng Pagbabago. Among its prominent members is former Ilocos Sur Governor and Narvacan mayor Chavit Singson.
