= Legislative districts of the Philippines =

The legislative districts of the Philippines are the divisions of the Philippines' provinces and cities for representation in the various legislative bodies. Congressional districts are for House of Representatives, while there are districts for Sangguniang Panlalawigan, and some Sangguniang Panlungsod. For purposes of representation, the Senate, most Sangguniang Panlungsod, Sangguniang Bayan, Sangguniang Barangay and Sangguniang Kabataan are all elected at-large, although there were districts for the Senate from 1916 to 1935.

The first composition of legislative districts was enshrined in the Ordinance appended to the Constitution. Changes in the composition of legislative districts were later added as new provinces and cities were created, and the composition was modified through laws enacted by Congress.

Apportionment on local legislatures is also possible.

== History ==
Representation to the legislature traces its origin to the Spanish era, when the Philippines was granted very limited representation to the Spanish Cortes. During the American period, when the Philippine Bill of 1902 was enacted, the first Philippine Assembly was established as the lower house and the then-existing Philippine Commission as the upper house. Representation in the assembly was apportioned among the provinces with respect to their population, provided that no province shall have less than one member.

In 1916, the Philippine Legislature was reconstituted with a Senate as the upper house and the Assembly retained as the lower house. The Senate elected members through Senatorial Districts, a grouping of provinces and areas of the country, while the Assembly retained its way of representation. During the Commonwealth period, the Philippine Legislature was abolished, and a unicameral National Assembly was established, with representation being like that of the Philippine Assembly, each province having at least one member depending on its population.

With the passage of the 1940 Amendments to the 1935 Constitution, a bicameral Congress was established with a House of Representatives and a Senate. The House of Representatives way of representation was like that of the Philippine Assembly, while the Senate's members were elected at large.

With the coming of the Interim Batasang Pambansa and the regular Batasan during the Marcos regime, representation was done in many ways: most members were elected by regions, some by appointment from the different sectors of the society such as youth and labor, and some were members of the Cabinet appointed by the President. However, with the advent of the 1987 Constitution, the Batasan was scrapped and the Congress was restored. The present way of electing delegates to the House of Representatives is through legislative districts apportioned among the provinces, cities and the Metropolitan Manila Area and through a party-list system of registered national, regional and sectoral parties or organizations.

== Senatorial districts ==
From 1916 to 1935, the Philippines was divided into 12 senatorial districts. Each district, except the 12th senatorial district, elected two senators to the Senate of the Philippines. The senators representing the twelfth senatorial district were appointed by the governor-general. Since 1941, when the Senate was restored, all 24 senators have been elected at large.

Senatorial district	Provinces and/or cities
First District	Abra (re-established in 1917), Batanes, Cagayan, Ilocos Norte, Ilocos Sur, Isabela
Second District	La Union, Pangasinan, Zambales
Third District	Bulacan, Nueva Ecija, Pampanga, Tarlac
Fourth District	Manila, Bataan, Laguna, Rizal
Fifth District	Batangas, Cavite, Marinduque (established in 1920), Mindoro, Tayabas
Sixth District	Albay, Ambos Camarines (split into Norte and Sur in 1917), Sorsogon
Seventh District	Capiz, Iloilo, Romblon (re-established in 1917)
Eighth District	Antique, Negros Occidental, Negros Oriental, Palawan
Ninth District	Leyte, Samar
Tenth District	Cebu
Eleventh District	Bohol, Misamis (split into Occidental and Oriental in 1929), Surigao
Twelfth District	Baguio, Department of Mindanao and Sulu (abolished in 1920, consisted of the provinces of Agusan, Bukidnon, Davao, Lanao, Sulu, and Zamboanga), Mountain Province (consisted of the sub-provinces of Apayao, Benguet, Bontoc, Ifugao, and Kalinga), Nueva Vizcaya

== Congressional districts ==
Number of districts per province and some cities in the 18th Congress of the Philippines.

Increased representation; Decreased representation

Province / City	Districts	Congress of the Philippines																			
Province / City	Districts	20th 2025–2028	19th 2022–2025	18th 2019–2022	17th 2016–2019	16th 2013–2016	15th 2010–2013	14th 2007–2010	13th 2004–2007	12th 2001–2004	11th 1998–2001	10th 1995–1998	9th 1992–1995	8th 1987–1992	7th 1970–1972	6th 1966–1969	5th 1962–1965	4th 1958–1961	3rd 1954–1957	2nd 1950–1953	1st 1946–1949
Abra	Abra	1	1	1	1	1	1	1	1	1	1	1	1	1	1	1	1	1	1	1	1
Agusan del Norte (with Cabadbaran)	Agusan del Norte	1	2	2	2	2	2	2	2	2	2	2	2	2	1	1	1	1	1	1	1
Agusan del Sur (with Bayugan)	Agusan del Sur	2	2	2	2	2	2	1	1	1	1	1	1	1	1	1	1	1	1	1	1
Aklan	Aklan	2	2	2	1	1	1	1	1	1	1	1	1	1	1	1	1	1	(see Capiz)		
Albay (with Legazpi, Ligao and Tabaco)	Albay	3	3	3	3	3	3	3	3	3	3	3	3	3	3	3	3	3	3	3	3
Antique	Antique	1	1	1	1	1	1	1	1	1	1	1	1	1	1	1	1	1	1	1	1
Apayao	Apayao	1	1	1	1	1	1	1	1	1	1	(see Kalinga)				(see Mountain Province)					
Aurora	Aurora	1	1	1	1	1	1	1	1	1	1	1	1	1	(see Quezon)						
Bacolod	Bacolod	1	1	1	1	1	1	1	1	1	1	1	1	1	(see Negros Occidental)						
Baguio	Baguio	1	1	1	1	1	1	1	1	1	1	1	(see Benguet)				(see Mountain Province)				
Basilan (with Isabela and Lamitan)	Basilan	1	1	1	1	1	1	1	1	1	1	1	1	1	(see Zamboanga del Sur)						
Bataan (with Balanga)	Bataan	3	3	2	2	2	2	2	2	2	2	2	2	2	2	1	1	1	1	1	1
Batanes	Batanes	1	1	1	1	1	1	1	1	1	1	1	1	1	1	1	1	1	1	1	1
Batangas (with Batangas City, Santo Tomas, Lipa, and Tanauan)	Batangas	6	6	6	6	4	4	4	4	4	4	4	4	4	3	3	3	3	3	3	3
Benguet	Benguet	1	1	1	1	1	1	1	1	1	1	1	2	2	1	(see Mountain Province)					
Biliran	Biliran	1	1	1	1	1	1	1	1	1	1	1	(see Leyte)								
Bohol (with Tagbilaran)	Bohol	3	3	3	3	3	3	3	3	3	3	3	3	3	3	3	3	3	3	3	3
Bukidnon (with Malaybalay and Valencia)	Bukidnon	4	4	4	4	4	3	3	3	3	3	3	3	3	1	1	1	1	1	1	1
Bulacan (with Malolos, Meycauayan and San Jose del Monte)	Bulacan, San Jose del Monte	7	7	5	5	5	5	5	5	4	4	4	4	2	2	2	2	2	2	2	2
Butuan	Butuan	1	(see Agusan del Norte)																		
Cagayan (with Tuguegarao)	Cagayan	3	3	3	3	3	3	3	3	3	3	3	3	3	2	2	2	2	2	2	2
Cagayan de Oro	Cagayan de Oro	2	2	2	2	2	2	2	1	1	1	1	1	1	(see Misamis Oriental)						
Caloocan	Caloocan	3	3	2	2	2	2	2	2	2	2	2	2	2	(see Rizal)						
Camarines Norte	Camarines Norte	2	2	2	2	2	2	1	1	1	1	1	1	1	1	1	1	1	1	1	1
Camarines Sur (with Iriga) and Naga	Camarines Sur	5	5	5	5	5	5	4	4	4	4	4	4	4	2	2	2	2	2	2	2
Camiguin	Camiguin	1	1	1	1	1	1	1	1	1	1	1	1	1	1	(see Misamis Oriental)					
Capiz (with Roxas)	Capiz	2	2	2	2	2	2	2	2	2	2	2	2	2	2	2	2	2	3	3	3
Catanduanes	Catanduanes	1	1	1	1	1	1	1	1	1	1	1	1	1	1	1	1	1	1	1	1
Cavite (with Bacoor, Cavite City, Dasmariñas, General Trias, Imus, Tagaytay, and Trece Martires)	Cavite	8	8	8	7	7	7	3	3	3	3	3	3	3	1	1	1	1	1	1	1
Cebu (with Bogo, Carcar, Danao, Naga, Talisay, and Toledo) and Mandaue	Cebu	7	7	7	7	6	6	6	6	6	6	6	6	6	7	7	7	7	7	7	7
Cebu City	Cebu City	2	2	2	2	2	2	2	2	2	2	2	2	2	(see Cebu)						
Cotabato (with Kidapawan)	Cotabato	3	3	3	3	3	2	2	2	2	2	2	2	2	1	1	1	1	1	1	1
Davao City	Davao City	3	3	3	3	3	3	3	3	3	3	3	3	3	(see Davao del Sur)		1	1	1	1	1
Davao de Oro	Davao de Oro	2	2	2	2	2	2	2	2	2	2	(see Davao del Norte)					1	1	1	1	1
Davao del Norte (with Panabo, Samal, and Tagum)	Davao del Norte	2	2	2	2	2	2	2	2	2	2	3	3	3	1	1	1	1	1	1	1
Davao del Sur (with Digos)	Davao del Sur	1	1	1	1	2	2	2	2	2	2	2	2	2	1	1	1	1	1	1	1
Davao Occidental	Davao Occidental	1	1	1	1	(see Davao del Sur)											1	1	1	1	1
Davao Oriental (with Mati)	Davao Oriental	2	2	2	2	2	2	2	2	2	2	2	2	2	1	1	1	1	1	1	1
Dinagat Islands	Dinagat Islands	1	1	1	1	1	1	1	(see Surigao del Norte)							(see Surigao)					
Eastern Samar (with Borongan)	Eastern Samar	1	1	1	1	1	1	1	1	1	1	1	1	1	1	1	(see Samar)				
General Santos	General Santos	1	1	(see South Cotabato)												(see Cotabato)					
Guimaras	Guimaras	1	1	1	1	1	1	1	1	1	1	1	(see Iloilo)								
Ifugao	Ifugao	1	1	1	1	1	1	1	1	1	1	1	1	1	(see Mountain Province)						
Iligan	Iligan	1	1	1	1	1	1	(see Lanao del Norte)													
Ilocos Norte (with Laoag and Batac)	Ilocos Norte	2	2	2	2	2	2	2	2	2	2	2	2	2	2	2	2	2	2	2	2
Ilocos Sur (with Candon and Vigan)	Ilocos Sur	2	2	2	2	2	2	2	2	2	2	2	2	2	2	2	2	2	2	2	2
Iloilo (with Passi)	Iloilo	5	5	5	5	5	5	5	5	5	5	5	5	5	5	5	5	5	5	5	5
Iloilo City	Iloilo City	1	1	1	1	1	1	1	1	1	1	1	1	1	(see Iloilo)						
Isabela (with Cauayan and Ilagan) and Santiago	Isabela	6	6	6	4	4	4	4	4	4	4	4	4	4	1	1	1	1	1	1	1
Kalinga (with Tabuk)	Kalinga	1	1	1	1	1	1	1	1	1	1	1	1	1	(see Mountain Province)						
La Union (with San Fernando)	La Union	2	2	2	2	2	2	2	2	2	2	2	2	2	2	2	2	2	2	2	2
Laguna (with Biñan, Cabuyao, Calamba, San Pablo, San Pedro, and Santa Rosa)	Laguna, Biñan, Calamba, Santa Rosa	7	7	6	5	4	4	4	4	4	4	4	4	4	2	2	2	2	2	2	2
Lanao del Norte	Lanao del Norte	2	2	2	2	2	2	2	2	2	2	2	2	2	1	1	1	1	1	1	1
Lanao del Sur (with Marawi)	Lanao del Sur	2	2	2	2	2	2	2	2	2	2	2	2	2	1	1	1	1	1	1	1
Lapu-Lapu	Lapu-Lapu	1	1	1	1	1	1	(see Cebu)													
Las Piñas	Las Piñas	1	1	1	1	1	1	1	1	1	1	1	1	1	(see Rizal)						
Muntinlupa	Muntinlupa	1	1	1	1	1	1	1	1	1	1	1	1	1	(see Rizal)						
Leyte (with Baybay), Ormoc, and Tacloban	Leyte	5	5	5	5	5	5	5	5	5	5	5	5	5	4	4	4	5	5	5	5
Maguindanao del Norte and Cotabato City	Maguindanao del Norte	1	1	2	2	2	2	2	2	2	2	2	2	2	(see Cotabato)						
Maguindanao del Sur	Maguindanao del Sur	1	1	2	2	2	2	2	2	2	2	2	2	2	(see Cotabato)						
Makati	Makati	2	2	2	2	2	2	2	2	2	2	1	1	1	(see Rizal)						
Malabon	Malabon	1	1	1	1	1	1	1	1	1	1	1	1	1	(see Rizal)						
Navotas	Navotas	1	1	1	1	1	1	1	1	1	1	1	1	1	(see Rizal)						
Mandaluyong	Mandaluyong	1	1	1	1	1	1	1	1	1	1	1	1	1	(see Rizal)						
San Juan	San Juan	1	1	1	1	1	1	1	1	1	1	1	1	1	(see Rizal)						
Mandaue	Mandaue	1	1	(see Cebu)																	
Manila	Manila	6	6	6	6	6	6	6	6	6	6	6	6	6	4	4	4	4	4	4	2
Marikina	Marikina	2	2	2	2	2	2	2	1	1	1	1	1	1	(see Rizal)						
Marinduque	Marinduque	1	1	1	1	1	1	1	1	1	1	1	1	1	1	1	1	1	1	1	1
Masbate (with Masbate City)	Masbate	3	3	3	3	3	3	3	3	3	3	3	3	3	1	1	1	1	1	1	1
Misamis Occidental (with Oroquieta, Ozamiz, and Tangub)	Misamis Occidental	2	2	2	2	2	2	2	2	2	2	2	2	2	1	1	1	1	1	1	1
Misamis Oriental (with El Salvador and Gingoog)	Misamis Oriental	2	2	2	2	2	2	2	2	2	2	2	2	2	1	1	1	1	1	1	1
Mountain Province	Mountain Province	1	1	1	1	1	1	1	1	1	1	1	1	1	1	3	3	3	3	3	3
Negros Occidental (with Bago, Cadiz, Escalante, Himamaylan, Kabankalan, La Carlota, Sagay, San Carlos, Silay, Sipalay, Talisay, and Victorias)	Negros Occidental	6	6	6	6	6	6	6	6	6	6	6	6	6	3	3	3	3	3	3	3
Negros Oriental (with Bais, Bayawan, Canlaon, Dumaguete, Guihulngan, and Tanjay)	Negros Oriental	3	3	3	3	3	3	3	3	3	3	3	3	3	2	2	2	2	2	2	2
Northern Samar	Northern Samar	2	2	2	2	2	2	2	2	2	2	2	2	2	1	1	(see Samar)				
Nueva Ecija (with Cabanatuan, Gapan, Muñoz, Palayan and San Jose)	Nueva Ecija	4	4	4	4	4	4	4	4	4	4	4	4	4	2	2	2	2	2	2	2
Nueva Vizcaya	Nueva Vizcaya	1	1	1	1	1	1	1	1	1	1	1	1	1	1	1	1	1	1	1	1
Occidental Mindoro	Occidental Mindoro	1	1	1	1	1	1	1	1	1	1	1	1	1	1	1	1	1	1	1	1
Oriental Mindoro (with Calapan)	Oriental Mindoro	2	2	2	2	2	2	2	2	2	2	2	2	2	1	1	1	1	1	1	1
Palawan and Puerto Princesa	Palawan	3	3	3	3	3	2	2	2	2	2	2	2	2	1	1	1	1	1	1	1
Pampanga (with Mabalacat and San Fernando) and Angeles City	Pampanga	4	4	4	4	4	4	4	4	4	4	4	4	4	2	2	2	2	2	2	2
Pangasinan (with Alaminos, San Carlos, and Urdaneta) and Dagupan	Pangasinan	6	6	6	6	6	6	6	6	6	6	6	6	6	5	5	5	5	5	5	5
Parañaque	Parañaque	2	2	2	2	2	2	2	2	1	1	1	1	1	(see Rizal)						
Pasay	Pasay	1	1	1	1	1	1	1	1	1	1	1	1	1	(see Rizal)						
Pasig	Pasig	1	1	1	1	1	1	1	1	1	1	1	1	1	(see Rizal)						
Quezon and Lucena	Quezon	4	4	4	4	4	4	4	4	4	4	4	4	4	2	2	2	2	2	2	2
Quezon City	Quezon City	6	6	6	6	6	4	4	4	4	4	4	4	4	(see Rizal)						
Quirino	Quirino	1	1	1	1	1	1	1	1	1	1	1	1	1	(see Nueva Vizcaya)						
Rizal (with Antipolo)	Rizal, Antipolo	6	6	4	4	4	4	4	4	3	3	2	2	2	2	2	2	2	2	2	2
Romblon	Romblon	1	1	1	1	1	1	1	1	1	1	1	1	1	1	1	1	1	1	1	1
Samar (with Calbayog and Catbalogan)	Samar	2	2	2	2	2	2	2	2	2	2	2	2	2	1	1	3	3	3	3	3
Sarangani	Sarangani	1	1	1	1	1	1	1	1	1	1	1	(see South Cotabato)			(see Cotabato)					
Siquijor	Siquijor	1	1	1	1	1	1	1	1	1	1	1	1	1	(see Negros Oriental)						
Sorsogon (with Sorsogon City)	Sorsogon	2	2	2	2	2	2	2	2	2	2	2	2	2	2	2	2	2	2	2	2
South Cotabato (with Koronadal)	South Cotabato	3	2	2	2	2	2	2	2	2	2	2	3	3	1	1	(see Cotabato)				
Southern Leyte (with Maasin)	Southern Leyte	2	2	1	1	1	1	1	1	1	1	1	1	1	1	1	(see Leyte)				
Sultan Kudarat (with Tacurong)	Sultan Kudarat	2	2	2	2	2	2	2	1	1	1	1	1	1	(see Cotabato)						
Sulu	Sulu	2	2	2	2	2	2	2	2	2	2	2	2	2	1	1	1	1	1	1	1
Surigao del Norte (with Surigao City)	Surigao del Norte	2	2	2	2	2	2	2	2	2	2	2	2	2	1	1	1	1	1	1	1
Surigao del Sur (with Bislig and Tandag)	Surigao del Sur	2	2	2	2	2	2	2	2	2	2	2	2	2	1	1	1	1	1	1	1
Taguig and Pateros	Taguig and Pateros–Taguig	2	2	2	2	2	2	2	1	1	1	1	1	1	(see Rizal)						
Tarlac (with Tarlac City)	Tarlac	3	3	3	3	3	3	3	3	3	3	3	3	3	2	2	2	2	2	2	2
Tawi-Tawi	Tawi-Tawi	1	1	1	1	1	1	1	1	1	1	1	1	1	(see Sulu)						
Valenzuela	Valenzuela	2	2	2	2	2	2	2	2	2	1	1	1	1	(see Bulacan)						
Zambales and Olongapo	Zambales	2	2	2	2	2	2	2	2	2	2	2	2	2	1	1	1	1	1	1	1
Zamboanga City	Zamboanga City	2	2	2	2	2	2	2	1	1	1	1	1	1	(see Zamboanga del Sur)					1	1
Zamboanga del Norte (with Dapitan and Dipolog)	Zamboanga del Norte	3	3	3	3	3	3	3	3	3	3	3	3	3	1	1	1	1	1	1	1
Zamboanga del Sur (with Pagadian)	Zamboanga del Sur	2	2	2	2	2	2	2	2	2	3	3	3	3	1	1	1	1	1	1	1
Zamboanga Sibugay	Zamboanga Sibugay	2	2	2	2	2	2	2	1	1	(see Zamboanga del Sur)									1	1
Total (Philippines)		254	253	243	238	235	230	219	212	209	208	203	200	200	110	104	104	102	102	100	98

== Local districts ==
As per the Bangsamoro Organic Law, representation in the Bangsamoro Parliament is based from its own parliamentary districts which is distinct from the congressional districts used to determine representation in the national House of Representatives. However the current composition of the parliament is interim in nature and all members are appointed by the President with no regard to the current districts established in February 2024.

Representation via provincial boards, known as Sangguniang Panlalawigan are also via congressional districts except for a few instances, such as Bulacan's 4th provincial board district includes San Jose del Monte, while its congressional district does not. The province's income determines how many seats it is entitled to, with 6 seats being the least. If a province only has one congressional district, the Commission on Elections then divides the province into two districts based on population and geography.

If a city is split into several congressional districts, representation via its city councils, known as Sangguniang Panlungsod, follows the districts as set by the congressional districts; otherwise, representation is via an at-large district.

At-large representation is also used in municipalities through their Sangguniang Bayan (except in Pateros, where it is split into two districts), and in barangays through their Sangguniang Barangay and Sangguniang Kabataan. At-large representation is always via plurality-at-large voting

== See also ==
- Administrative divisions of the Philippines
- Congress of the Philippines
- Senate of the Philippines
- House of Representatives of the Philippines
