= 2022 Ilocos Norte local elections =

Philippine election

- Registered: 434,114
- Turnout: 380,721
- 2022 Ilocos Norte gubernatorial election
- May 9, 2022
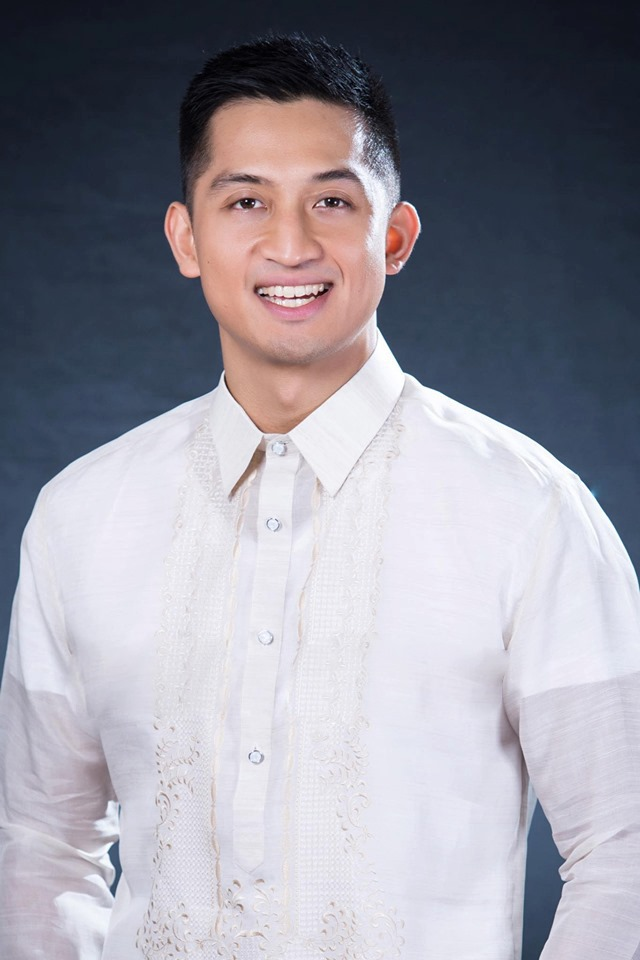
		PDR
Candidate	Matthew Manotoc	Rudy Fariñas
Party	Nacionalista	Reporma
Running mate	Cecilia Marcos
Popular vote	261,885	94,372
Percentage	73.51	26.49
Governor before election
Matthew Manotoc
Nacionalista
Elected Governor
Matthew Manotoc
Nacionalista
- 2022 Ilocos Norte vice gubernatorial election
- May 9, 2022
	NP	PDP–Laban
Candidate	Cecilia Marcos	Michael Ramones
Party	Nacionalista	PDP–Laban
Popular vote	267,896	8,254
Percentage	92.77	2.85
	PDR	Ind
Candidate	Sherwin Bumanglag	Joy Mintalon Butay
Party	Reporma	Independent
Popular vote	7,785	4,835
Percentage	2.69	1.67
Vice-Governor before election
Cecilia Marcos
Nacionalista
Elected Vice-Governor
Cecilia Marcos
Nacionalista

Local elections were held in Ilocos Norte on May 9, 2022, as part of the 2022 Philippine general election. Voters will select candidates for all local positions: a town mayor, vice mayor, and town councilors, as well as members of the Sangguniang Panlalawigan, a vice-governor, a governor, and representatives for the province's two congressional districts in the Philippine House of Representatives.

== Provincial elections ==
=== Governor ===
Ilocos Norte Gubernatorial Election
Party	Candidate	Votes	%
Nacionalista	Matthew Manotoc (Incumbent)	261,885	73.51
Reporma	Rudy Fariñas	94,372	26.49
Total votes		356,257	100
Nacionalista hold			

==== By City/municipality ====
City/Municipality	Matthew Manotoc		Rudy Fariñas		Total votes
City/Municipality	Votes	%	Votes	%	Total votes
Adams	1,216	81.78	271	18.22	1,487
Bacarra	13,220	68.86	5,979	31.14	19,199
Badoc	14,384	78.08	4,037	21.92	18,421
Bangui	6,579	70.85	2,707	29.15	9,286
Banna	10,052	95.17	510	4.83	10,562
Batac	27,119	82.42	5,785	17.58	32,904
Burgos	3,814	62.35	2,303	37.65	6,117
Carasi	510	45.86	602	54.14	1,112
Currimao	7,560	85.77	1,254	14.23	8,814
Dingras	19,263	88.99	2,384	11.01	21,647
Dumalneg	537	31.29	1,179	68.71	1,716
Laoag	44,695	66.49	22,529	33.51	67,224
Marcos	9,170	85.17	1,597	14.83	10,767
Nueva Era	4,892	97.31	135	2.69	5,027
Pagudpud	11,551	75.10	3,829	24.90	15,380
Paoay	11,766	80.74	2,806	19.26	14,572
Pasuquin	11,810	63.85	6,686	36.15	18,496
Piddig	6,544	51.39	6,191	48.61	12,735
Pinili	8,438	79.62	2,160	20.38	10,598
San Nicolas	17,999	83.46	3,567	16.54	21,566
Sarrat	8,812	58.25	6,315	41.75	15,127
Solsona	12,783	87.10	1,893	12.90	14,676
Vintar	9,524	50.59	9,300	49.41	18,824
Total	261,885	73.51	94,372	26.49	356,257

=== Vice Governor ===
Ilocos Norte Vice Gubernatorial Election
Party	Candidate	Votes	%
Nacionalista	Cecilia Marcos (Incumbent)	267,896	92.77
PDP–Laban	Michael Ramones	8,254	2.85
Reporma	Sherwin Bumanglag	7,785	2.69
Independent	Joy Mintalon Butay	4,835	1.67
Total votes		356,257	100
Nacionalista hold			

==== By City/municipality ====
City/Municipality	Cecilia Marcos		Michael Ramones		Sherwin Bumanglag		Joy Mintalon Butay		Total votes
City/Municipality	Votes	%	Votes	%	Votes	%	Votes	%	Total votes
Adams	974	93.30	22	2.11	31	2.97	17	1.63	1,044
Bacarra	13,615	88.88	1,229	8.02	315	2.06	160	1.04	15,319
Badoc	14,829	94.72	214	1.37	472	3.02	140	0.89	15,655
Bangui	6,369	93.26	180	2.64	218	3.19	62	0.91	6,829
Banna	9,092	96.21	54	0.57	242	2.56	62	0.66	9,450
Batac	27,049	96.26	272	0.97	505	1.80	275	0.98	28,101
Burgos	3,830	91.69	118	2.82	173	4.14	56	1.34	4,177
Carasi	660	88.59	34	4.56	30	4.03	21	2.82	745
Currimao	7,335	96.77	53	0.70	129	1.70	63	0.83	7,580
Dingras	17,688	96.31	187	1.02	258	1.40	232	1.26	18,365
Dumalneg	731	83.35	55	6.27	71	8.10	20	2.28	877
Laoag	47,139	89.50	2,870	5.45	1,775	3.37	884	1.68	52,668
Marcos	8,722	93.48	85	0.91	405	4.34	118	1.26	9,330
Nueva Era	4,515	99.01	12	0.26	13	0.29	20	0.44	4,560
Pagudpud	11,281	94.13	237	1.98	309	2.58	157	1.31	11,984
Paoay	11,759	95.22	146	1.18	328	2.66	116	0.94	12,349
Pasuquin	12,664	91.70	593	4.29	342	2.48	212	1.54	13,811
Piddig	8,655	89.26	378	3.90	507	5.23	156	1.61	9,696
Pinili	8,872	95.87	60	0.65	266	2.87	56	0.61	9,254
San Nicolas	16,884	90.02	194	1.03	288	1.54	1,389	7.41	18,755
Sarrat	10,635	90.72	384	3.28	457	3.90	247	2.11	11,723
Solsona	12,240	96.52	133	1.05	175	1.38	133	1.05	12,681
Vintar	12,358	89.44	744	5.38	476	3.45	239	1.73	13,817
Total	267,896	92.77	8,254	2.85	7,785	2.69	4,835	1.67	356,257

== Congressional elections ==
=== Congressional districts ===
==== 1st District ====
Philippine House of Representatives Election at Ilocos Norte's 1st District
Party	Candidate	Votes	%
Nacionalista	Sandro Marcos	108,423	56.63
PDP–Laban	Ria Fariñas (Incumbent)	83,034	43.36
Total votes		191,457	100
Nacionalista gain from PDP–Laban			

==== 2nd District ====
Philippine House of Representatives Election at Ilocos Norte's 2nd District
Party	Candidate	Votes	%
Nacionalista	Eugenio Angelo Barba (Incumbent)	127,867	79.08
Reporma	Jeffrey Jubal Nalupta	30,920	19.12
PDP–Laban	Juanito Antonio	2,897	1.79
Total votes		161,684	100
Nacionalista hold			

== Provincial Board elections ==
=== Provincial Board ===
Party	Votes	%	Seats
Nacionalista Party	688,502	65.68	8
PDP–Laban	187,891	17.92	1
Kilusang Bagong Lipunan	35,495	3.39	–
Reproma	4,868	0.46	–
Independent	131,537	12.55	1
Ex officio seats			3
Total	1,048,293	100.00	13

==== 1st District ====
Ilocos Norte Provincial Board Election at Ilocos Norte's 1st District
Party	Candidate	Votes	%
PDP–Laban	Junior Fariñas	90,259	17.18
Nacionalista	Saul Lazo (Incumbent)	88,031	16.75
Nacionalista	Franklin Dante Respicio (Incumbent)	83,423	15.87
Nacionalista	Donald Nicolas (Incumbent)	81,633	15.53
Nacionalista	Portia Salenda (Incumbent)	78,890	15.01
PDP–Laban	Modesto De La Cuesta	60,262	11.47
Nacionalista	Aldrick Peralta	23,963	4.56
Independent	Emilio Perucho	18,895	3.59
Total votes		525,356	100.00

==== 2nd District ====
Ilocos Norte Provincial Board Election at Ilocos Norte's 2nd District
Party	Candidate	Votes	%
Nacionalista	Rafael Medina (Incumbent) (Note: Ex-officio member as SK Chairman.)	88,094	16.84
Nacionalista	Medeldorf Gaoat (Incumbent)	81,181	15.52
Independent	Aladine Santos (Incumbent)	63,065	12.05
Nacionalista	Giancarlo Crisostomo	61,678	11.79
Nacionalista	Jonathan Torralba	57,540	11.00
Nacionalista	MacArthur Aguinaldo	44,069	8.42
Independent	Julu Nalupta	39,932	7.63
PDP–Laban	Marcelino Quitoras Jr.	37,370	7.14
KBL	Marie Dumalo	35,495	6.78
Independent	Angelo Raham Sison	4,199	0.80
Reporma	Mark Raguindin	3,225	0.61
Independent	Walter John Lozano Jr.	2,966	0.56
Independent	Coco Reyes	2,480	0.47
Reporma	Arvi Anthony Suga	1,643	0.31
Total votes		522,937	100.00
