= Legislative districts of Calamba =

Legislative district of the Philippines

The legislative district of Calamba are the representations of the component city of Calamba in the Congress of the Philippines. The city is currently represented in the lower house of the Congress through its lone congressional district.

== History ==
Calamba was represented as part of the at-large district of Laguna in the Malolos Congress (1898–1899), National Assembly of the Second Philippine Republic (1943–1944) and Regular Batasang Pambansa (1984–1986) and the first district of Laguna from 1907 to 1941 and from 1945 to 1972. The province of Laguna was represented in the Interim Batasang Pambansa as part of Region IV-A from 1978 to 1984, and elected four representatives at-large to the Regular Batasang Pambansa in 1984. Calamba was placed in the second district of Laguna in accordance with the apportionment ordinance of the new constitution which was proclaimed on February 11, 1987.

Calamba was separated from the second congressional district of Laguna by virtue of Republic Act No. 11078, which granted the city separate representation on September 24, 2018. The city elected its first representative in the 2019 elections.

Although Calamba is represented separately from the rest of Laguna in the House of Representatives of the Philippines, the city's residents remain part of the province's 2nd Sangguniang Panlalawigan district for the purpose of electing SP members.

== Lone District ==
Lakas-CMD (1)

Legislative districts and representatives of Calamba
District	Current Representative	Party	Residency	Barangays	Population (2024)	Area
Lone	Charisse Anne Hernandez (since 2022)	Lakas–CMD	Parian	List: Bagong Kalsada; Bañadero; Banlic; Barandal; Barangay 1 (Poblacion); Barangay 2 (Poblacion); Barangay 3 (Poblacion); Barangay 4 (Poblacion); Barangay 5 (Poblacion); Barangay 6 (Poblacion); Barangay 7 (Poblacion); Batino; Bubuyan; Bucal; Bunggo; Burol; Camaligan; Canlubang; Halang; Hornalan; Kay-Anlog; La Mesa; Laguerta; Lawa; Lecheria; Lingga; Looc; Mabato; Majada Labas; Makiling; Mapagong; Masili; Maunong; Mayapa; Milagrosa; Paciano Rizal; Palingon; Palo-Alto; Pansol; Parian; Prinza; Punta; Puting Lupa; Real; Saimsim; Sampiruhan; San Cristobal; San Jose; San Juan; Sirang Lupa; Sucol; Turbina; Ulango; Uwisan	575,046	149.50 km^{2}

== See also ==
- Legislative districts of Laguna
  - Legislative district of Biñan
  - Legislative district of Santa Rosa
