= 2025 Ilocos Norte local elections =

Local elections in Ilocos Norte, Philippines

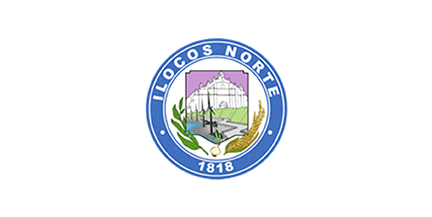
- May 12, 2025
- Gubernatorial election
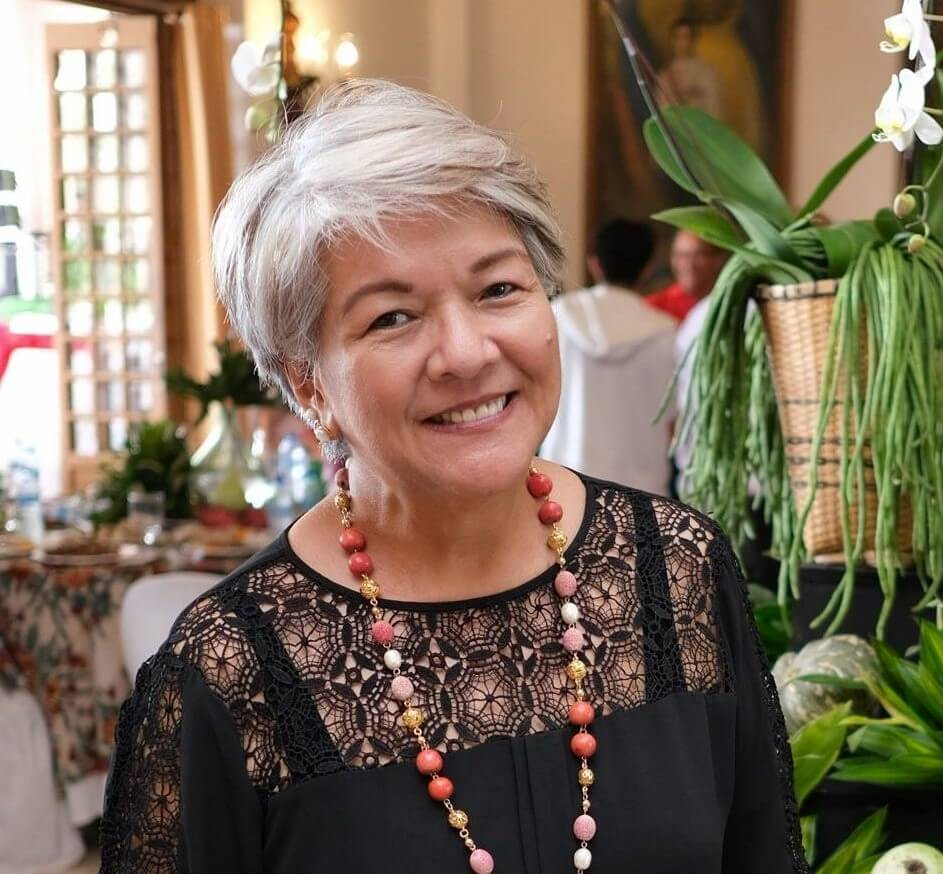
		IND
Candidate	Cecilia Marcos	Joy Butay
Party	Nacionalista	Independent
Running mate	Matthew Manotoc	None
Popular vote	299,037	14,089
Percentage	95.5%	4.5%
Governor before election
Matthew Manotoc
Nacionalista
Elected Governor
Cecilia Marcos
Nacionalista
- Vice gubernatorial election
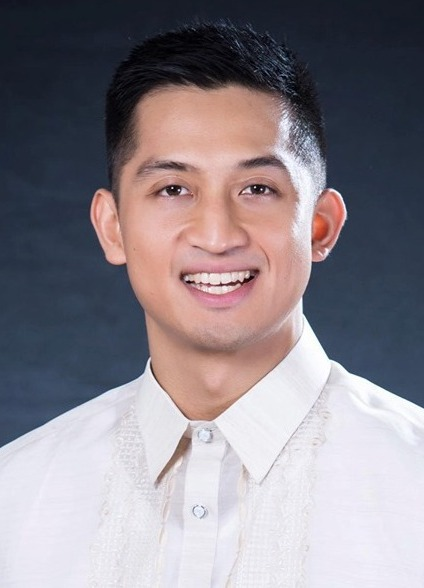
Candidate	Matthew Manotoc
Party	Nacionalista
Popular vote	313,943
Percentage	100%
Vice Governor before election
Cecilia Marcos
Nacionalista
Elected Vice Governor
Matthew Manotoc
Nacionalista
- Provincial Board election

10 of 13 seats in the Ilocos Norte Provincial Board 7 seats needed for a majority
	First party	Second party	Third party
Party	Nacionalista	Reporma	Independent
Last election	65.68%, 8 seats	0.46%, 0 seats	12.55%, 1 seats
Seats before	8	0	1
Seats won	7	2	1
Seat change	▼1	▲2	Steady
Popular vote	808,924	192,899	157,220
Percentage	69.79%	16.64%	13.56%

Local elections were held in Ilocos Norte on May 12, 2025, as part of the 2025 Philippine general election. Ilocos Norte voters will elect a governor, a vice governor, and 10 out of 13 members of the Ilocos Norte Provincial Board.

== Governor ==
Incumbent Matthew Manotoc (Nacionalista Party) was initially running for a third term, but withdrew on October 8, 2024, to run for vice governor unopposed. He was substituted by Cecilia Marcos, the incumbent vice governor.

Manotoc was re-elected as governor with 73.51% of the vote in 2022.

=== Candidates ===
The following are the candidates who are included in the ballot:

No.	Candidate	Party
1	Joy Butay	Independent
2	Cecilia Marcos	Nacionalista Party

=== Results ===
Candidate	Party	Votes	%
Cecilia Marcos	Nacionalista Party	299,037	95.50
Joy Butay	Independent	14,089	4.50
Total		313,126	100.00

== Vice governor ==
Incumbent Cecilia Marcos (Nacionalista Party) was initially running for a third term, but withdrew on October 8, 2024, to run for governor. She was substituted by Matthew Manotoc, the incumbent governor.

Marcos was elected with 92.77% of the vote in 2022.

=== Candidates ===
The following are the candidates who are included in the ballot:

No.	Candidate	Party
1	Matthew Manotoc	Nacionalista Party

=== Results ===
Candidate	Party	Votes	%
Matthew Manotoc	Nacionalista Party	313,943	100.00
Total		313,943	100.00

== Provincial Board ==
The Ilocos Norte Provincial Board is composed of 13 board members, 10 of whom are elected.

In the 2022 election, the Nacionalista Party won eight seats, achieving a majority in the provincial board.

=== Term-limited board members ===
The following board members are term-limited:

- Donald Nicolas (Nacionalista, 1st District)

=== Overview ===
Party	Votes	%	Seats
Nacionalista Party	808,924	69.79	7
Partido para sa Demokratikong Reporma	192,899	16.64	2
Independent	157,220	13.56	1
Ex officio seats			3
Total	1,159,043	100.00	13

=== 1st District ===
Ilocos Norte's 1st provincial district consists of the same area as Ilocos Norte's 1st legislative district. Five board members are elected from this provincial district.

==== Candidates ====
The following are the candidates who are included in the ballot:

No.	Candidate	Party
1	Edison Bonoan	Independent
2	Hanson Chua	Nacionalista Party
3	Bong Crisostomo	Independent
4	Junior Fariñas (incumbent)	Partido para sa Demokratikong Reporma
5	RJ Fariñas	Partido para sa Demokratikong Reporma
6	Saul Lazo (incumbent)	Nacionalista Party
7	Franklin Dante Respicio (incumbent)	Nacionalista Party
8	Portia Salenda (incumbent)	Nacionalista Party
9	Marlon Sales	Nacionalista Party

==== Results ====
Candidate	Party	Votes	%
RJ Fariñas	Partido para sa Demokratikong Reporma	104,726	16.29
Hanson Chua	Nacionalista Party	98,834	15.38
Junior Fariñas (incumbent)	Partido para sa Demokratikong Reporma	88,173	13.72
Marlon Sales	Nacionalista Party	84,725	13.18
Saul Lazo (incumbent)	Nacionalista Party	78,157	12.16
Franklin Dante Respicio (incumbent)	Nacionalista Party	72,103	11.22
Portia Salenda (incumbent)	Nacionalista Party	69,071	10.75
Edison Bonoan	Independent	40,965	6.37
Bong Crisostomo	Independent	6,049	0.94
Total		642,803	100.00

=== 2nd District ===
Ilocos Norte's 1st provincial district consists of the same area as Ilocos Norte's 2nd legislative district. Five board members are elected from this provincial district.

==== Candidates ====
The following are the candidates who are included in the ballot:

No.	Candidate	Party
1	Gian Crisostomo (incumbent)	Nacionalista Party
2	Medeldorf Gaoat (incumbent)	Nacionalista Party
3	Rafael Salvador Medina (incumbent)	Nacionalista Party
4	James Paul Nalupta	Independent
5	Joefrey Saguid	Nacionalista Party
6	Aladine Santos (incumbent)	Independent
7	Jonathan Torralba (incumbent)	Nacionalista Party

Julu Nalupta (Independent) was included in the list of candidates as of December 3, 2024, but was not included in the ballot.

==== Results ====
Candidate	Party	Votes	%
Rafael Salvador Medina (incumbent)	Nacionalista Party	107,725	20.87
Joefrey Saguid	Nacionalista Party	85,392	16.54
Medeldorf Gaoat (incumbent)	Nacionalista Party	82,669	16.01
Gian Crisostomo (incumbent)	Nacionalista Party	76,657	14.85
Aladine Santos (incumbent)	Independent	68,310	13.23
Jonathan Torralba (incumbent)	Nacionalista Party	53,591	10.38
James Paul Nalupta	Independent	41,896	8.12
Total		516,240	100.00
