= Julio Agcaoili =

Filipino revolutionary and politician

Julio Ventura Agcaoili (12 April 1856 – 5 January 1938) was a Filipino revolutionary and politician. He became governor of Ilocos Norte from 1902 to 1906.

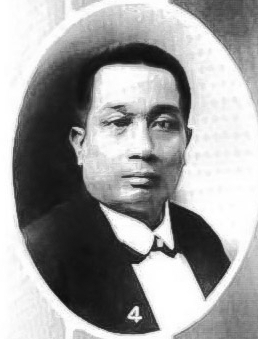
Portrait as governor of Ilocos Norte, published c. 1905 by the United States Bureau of the Census

== Early life and career ==
Agcaoili was born in 1856 at Piddig, Ilocos Norte. During his early career, he held positions in the offices in the notary, registrar to the court in his locality, and as a clerk. When the Philippine Revolution broke out, he worked as a fiscal officer. During the American occupation, he was appointed provincial secretary until he was elected governor in the province of Ilocos Norte.

== As governor ==
He was elected governor of Ilocos Norte twice. First in 1902 then reelected in 1904. In 1904, he became a member of the honorary board of Filipino commissioners to the Louisiana Purchase Exposition.

As a politician, he was a member of the Federalista Party. After his governorship he became secretary under Governor Melchor Flor of Ilocos Norte in 1906.

== Personal life ==
Being a Katipunero who fought the Spanish regime, Agcaoili felt uneasy with Filipinos cooperating with the Americans. His uneasiness became personal when his daughter, Trinidad, fell in love with an American teacher, George Summers. Nevertheless, his granddaughter, Helen Agcaoili Summers Brown, spent her summers as a youth with his family in Laoag.

== Later career ==
Agcaoili was appointed as justice of the peace of the municipality of Laoag in 1916. His appointment was based on a law allowing tenure during good behavior. In 1923, a new law imposed a 65-year age limit for justices of the peace. Following this, the Undersecretary of Justice directed Agcaoili to vacate his office, citing his age. Agcaoili contested this action by filing a quo warranto petition in 1925, which the trial court dismissed on the grounds of prescription. He subsequently appealed to the Supreme Court, arguing that the new age limit could not be applied retroactively and that the prescription period had not expired.
