= Sangguniang Panlalawigan =

Provincial legislature in Philippine provinces

Sangguniang Panlalawigan (abbreviated as SP; lit. 'provincial council'), commonly known as the Provincial Board, are the legislatures in Philippine provinces. They are the legislative branches of the provinces, and their powers and responsibilities are defined by the Local Government Code of 1991. Along with the provincial governor, the executive branch of the province, they form the province's government.

Members are either called "board members" (BM) or "Sangguniang Panlalawigan members" (SPM). In Tagalog-speaking provinces, they are informally called "bokal".

== History ==
During the early period of Spanish colonization, newly conquered areas were designated as encomiendas which were headed by an encomendero chosen by the Spanish from among the ranks of the powerful local nobles. Encomiendas were organized only for the purposes of collecting tribute that went in part to the Roman Catholic Church, the Spanish army, and to the Royal Treasury. Later on areas which were organized and given the designation of "province" (provincia) were led by an appointed alcalde who performed judicial, fiscal and executive functions. This system of government lasted for almost three hundred years until 1886 when a governor (gobernador) was first appointed in each of the eighteen existing provinces, relegating the alcalde to carry out only judicial functions.

American rule brought radical changes to the system of local government in the country. In 1901 the Philippine Commission enacted Act No. 83, known as the Provincial Government Act, which outlined the powers, responsibilities and composition of the provincial government. Each regularly organized province was provided a Provincial Board composed of three provincial officials: the governor, the treasurer, and a "third member" who in most cases was known as the supervisor. The governor in regularly organized provinces under civilian control were initially elected by municipal vice-presidents and councilors within the province through a convention held in the provincial capital every even-numbered year. As civil government took hold, the governorship was made elective. The composition of provincial boards were also later modified, with the treasurer and "third member" taken out and replaced by two members elected by popular vote. Not all provinces had the same type of government. Officials in specially organized provinces (those termed "Non-Christian provinces") were appointed by the Governor-General with the approval of the Philippine Commission until legislation gradually brought each of them in line with regularly organized provinces, that by the time of independence in 1946 all provinces had largely similar governments.

The passage of Republic Act No. 2264 (the "Local Autonomy Act") on June 19, 1959, not only granted greater autonomy to local governments, but also expanded the composition of the Provincial Board by creating a new elective office, the vice-governorship, as well as providing for provinces of the first, second and third income class to have one additional elected board member. However, the Board still had limited real legislative powers, as the provincial government was merely serving as an extension of national government. Republic Act No. 5185 was enacted in 1967 with the intention of decentralizing authority and further empowering local governments to address the needs of their constituents more effectively.

By virtue of Presidential Decree No. 826 issued by President Ferdinand Marcos on November 14, 1975 all existing governing boards and councils in each province, city and municipality were renamed Sangguniang Bayan. The province-level Sangguniang Bayan (later given the name Sangguniang Panlalawigan, commonly abbreviated to SP) consisted of all the incumbent provincial board members (including the governor and vice-governor), plus a representative from each municipality within the province, and the provincial president of the Katipunan ng Mga Kabataang Barangay or Association of Barangay Youth.

Batas Pambansa Blg. 51, enacted in 1979, standardized the composition of all provincial legislatures by reducing the membership of the Sangguniang Panlalawigan. All provinces were entitled to 6 elective SP members, unless they had more than one million residents (8 members) or less than 100,000 residents (4 members). Direct municipal representation was eliminated, and in its place was indirect "grassroots" representation through the president of the provincial association of barangay chairmen who was appointed by the President, who also happened to be the Prime Minister. Other members of the new Sanggunian were the governor and the vice governor, both elected by popular vote, and the president of the provincial federation of the Kabataang Barangay, appointed by the President/Prime Minister.

The powers and duties of the Sangguniang Panlalawigan was codified under Batas Pambansa Blg. 337, also known as the Local Government Code of 1983. The governor served as an ex officio member, who did not vote except only to break a tie, but had the power to veto items within, or entire, Sanggunian ordinances and resolutions. However the veto can be overridden by a two-thirds vote of all voting SP members.

The Sangguniang Panlalawigan was retained as the legislative branch of all provincial governments under the 1987 Constitution and the Local Government Code of 1991. However, unlike the old Provincial Boards or the pre-1992 Sanggunian, which included in their memberships provincial executives, under current laws the governor is not considered as a Sanggunian member (although the governor retains the power to veto SP legislation, which can still be overridden by a two-thirds vote of all voting members), and the vice-governor, who has now become the presiding officer, only participates in breaking ties in voting. Since 1992 SP members are elected from districts to ensure geographical representation, and the size of the province's Sanggunian was dependent on its income classification rather than population.

== Powers, duties, and functions ==
The powers, duties, and functions of the Sanggunian are outlined in Section 468 of the Local Government Code of 1991. The legislative body is tasked in general to "enact ordinances, approve resolutions and appropriate funds for the general welfare of the province and its inhabitants... in the proper exercise of the corporate powers of the province." Its powers, duties and functions are outlined into five broad mandates:

- "Approve ordinances and pass resolutions necessary for an efficient and effective provincial government," which includes:
  - Reviewing all ordinances approved by the Sangguniang Panlungsod and Sangguniang Bayan of the province's component cities and municipalities to ensure that they and their mayors are within their scope of powers as outlined in the Local Government Code
  - Enacting measures to maintain peace and order and imposing penalties on violations of such ordinances
  - Approving ordinances that impose fines and/or imprisonment for violations of provincial ordinances
  - Adopt measures to protect the inhabitants of the province from harmful effects of man-made or natural disasters, and provide relief services and assistance for victims not only during and in the aftermath of disasters and calamities, but also in their "return to productive livelihood" following the events
  - Enacting ordinances intended to prevent, suppress and impose appropriate penalties for "activities inimical to the welfare and morals of the inhabitants of the province," such as prostitution, juvenile delinquency and drug addiction.
  - Protect the environment and impose appropriate penalties for acts which endanger the environment
  - Determine the powers and duties of officials and employees of the province in accordance with the Local Government Code and pertinent laws, and also determine their wages, salaries, allowances, honorariums, compensation and other emoluments and benefits, and provide for expenditures necessary to properly carry out programs, projects, services and activities of the provincial government
  - Provide a mechanism (and appropriate funding for it) to ensure the safety and protection of all provincial government property, public documents and records
  - When the finances of the provincial government allow, provide for additional allowances or other benefits to officials and public servants working in the province
- "Generate and maximize the use of resources and revenues for the development plans, program objectives and priorities of the province... with particular attention to agro-industrial development and country-wide growth and progress and relative thereto," which involve the following:
  - Enact annual and supplemental appropriations of the provincial government and appropriate funds for specific programs, projects, services and activities of the province, or for other purposes not contrary to law, in order to promote the general welfare of the province and its inhabitants
  - Subject to the provisions of Book II of the Local Government Code and applicable laws and upon the majority vote of all the members of the sangguniang panlalawigan:
    - Enact ordinances levying taxes, fees and charges, prescribing the rates thereof for general and specific purposes, and granting tax exemptions, incentives or reliefs
    - Authorize the provincial governor to negotiate and contract loans and other forms of indebtedness
    - Enact ordinances authorizing the floating of bonds or other instruments of indebtedness, for the purpose of raising funds to finance development projects
  - Appropriate funds for the construction and maintenance or the rental of buildings for the use of the province; and upon the majority vote of all the members of the sangguniang panlalawigan, authorize the provincial governor to lease to private parties such public buildings held in a proprietary capacity, subject to existing laws, rules and regulations
  - Prescribe reasonable limits and restraints on the use of property within the jurisdiction of the province
  - Review the comprehensive land use plans and zoning ordinances of component cities and municipalities and adopt a comprehensive provincial land use plan, subject to existing laws
  - Adopt measures to enhance the full implementation of the national agrarian reform program in coordination with the Department of Agrarian Reform
- "Grant franchises, approve the issuance of permits or licenses, or enact ordinances levying taxes, fees and charges upon such conditions and for such purposes," which include the power to:
  - Fix and impose reasonable fees and charges for all services rendered by the provincial government to private persons or entities
  - Regulate and fix the license fees for such activities as provided for under the Local Government Code
- "Approve ordinances which shall ensure the efficient and effective delivery of basic services and facilities" and, in addition to the services and facilities outlined in Section 17 of the Local Government Code, also:
  - Adopt measures and safeguards against pollution and for the preservation of the natural ecosystem in the province, in consonance with approved standards on human settlements and environmental sanitation
  - Subject to applicable laws, facilitate or provide for the establishment and maintenance of waterworks system or district waterworks for supplying water to inhabitants of component cities and municipalities
  - Provide for the establishment and operation of vocational and technical schools and similar post-secondary institutions; and, with the approval of the Department of Education and subject to existing laws on tuition fees, fix reasonable tuition fees and other school charges in educational institutions supported by the provincial government
  - Establish a scholarship fund for the poor but deserving students in schools located within its jurisdiction or for students residing within the province
  - Approve measures and adopt quarantine regulations to prevent the introduction and spread of diseases within its territorial jurisdiction
  - Provide for the care of "needy and disadvantaged persons, particularly children and youth below eighteen (18) years of age"
    - Establish and support the operation of centers and facilities for them and facilitate efforts to promote the welfare of families below the poverty threshold, the disadvantaged, and the exploited
  - Establish and provide the maintenance and improvement of jails and detention centers, institute a sound jail management program, and appropriate funds for the subsistence of detainees and convicted prisoners in the province
  - Establish a provincial council whose purpose is the promotion of culture and the arts, coordinate with government agencies and non-governmental organizations and appropriate funds for the support and development of the same
  - Establish a provincial council for the elderly which shall formulate policies and adopt measures mutually beneficial to the elderly and to the province, and appropriate funds and provide incentives for NGOs to support the programs and projects of the elderly
- "Exercise such other powers and perform such other duties and functions as may be prescribed by law or ordinance"

== Composition ==
The Sangguniang Panlalawigan is composed of regularly elected members, ex officio members, and members representing reserved seats for certain sectors. The provincial vice-governor serves as its presiding officer, who does not vote except in cases to break a tie.

Regularly elected members are elected from Sangguniang Panlalawigan districts. The total number of SP members to be elected within the province, and the number within each SP district, varies depending on several factors, including the province's income class and the population count within districts.

Ex officio members in the Sanggunian include:

- the president of the provincial chapter of the Liga ng mga Barangay
- the president of the provincial federation of Youth Councils (Sangguniang Kabataan)
- the president of the provincial federation of the Philippine Councilors League (Sangguniang Panlungsod and Sangguniang Bayan members from component cities and municipalities)

Reserved seats in the Sanggunian include:

- the Indigenous Peoples Mandatory Representative (IPMR) is pursuant to the Republic Act 8371, or the Indigenous Peoples' Rights Act of 1997, which calls for the mandatory representation of IPs which is formally certified by the concerned National Commission on Indigenous People (NCIP) regional director, upon recommendation of the provincial or community service center head and shall serve for a period of three years from the date of assumption to office and can be re-endorsed for another term as long as he or she would not serve for more than three consecutive terms.

The Local Government Code of 1991 also provides for the election of 3 "sectoral representatives," which are supposed to come from:

- women's sector
- agricultural or industrial sector
- other sectors, including the disabled, the urban poor, or indigenous cultural communities

Although several attempts have been made in the past to provide for the election of these sectoral representatives, the lack of a more concrete enabling law upon which the manner of election of these sectoral representatives can be legally based continues to prevent this feature of local governments from being fully realized.

== Allocation and apportionment of regularly elected members ==
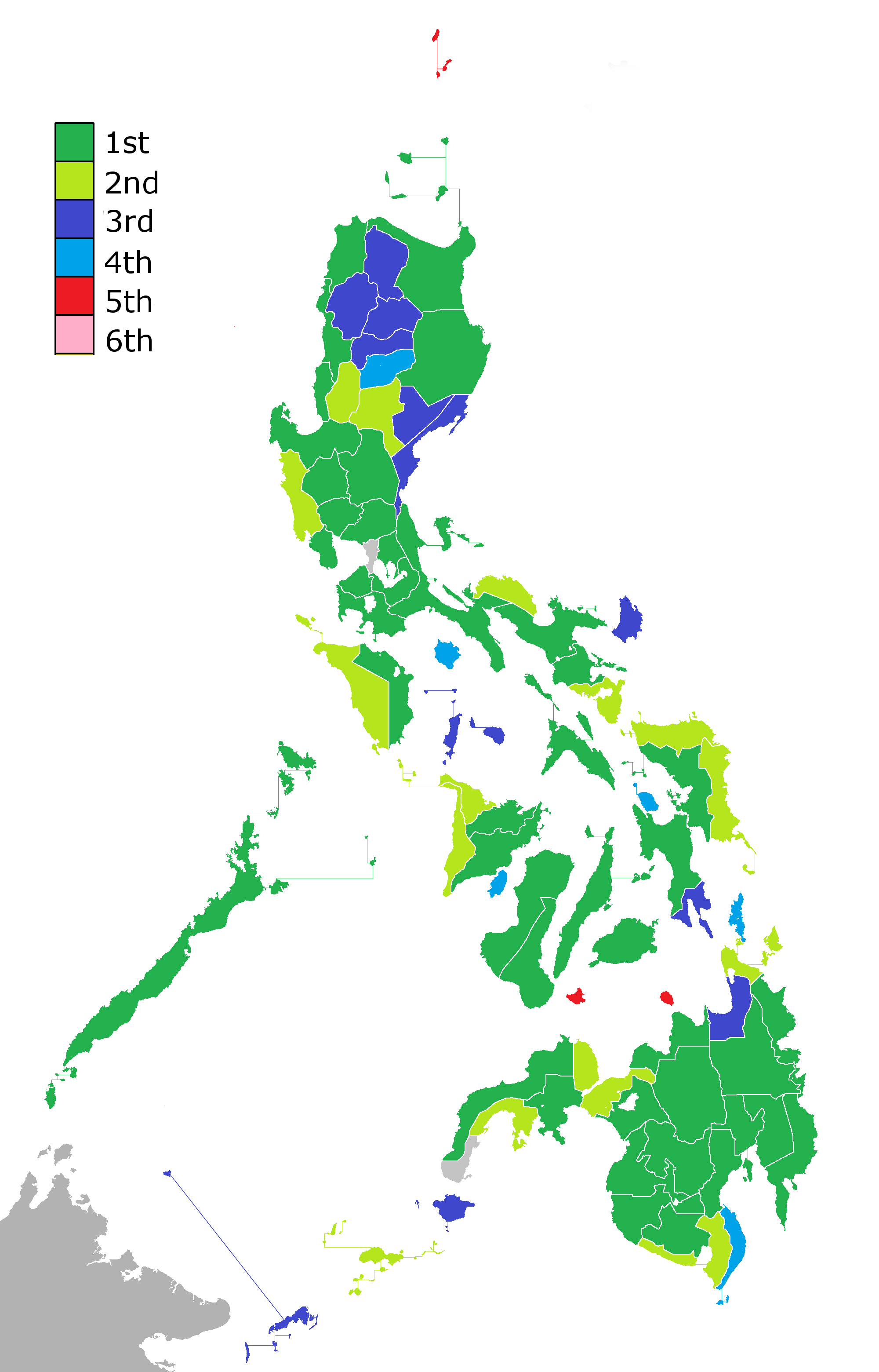
Provinces based on number of regular Sangguniang Panlalawigan seats: greens at least 10, blues 8, and reds 6.

The number of regular Sanggunian members is based on the income of the province as classified by the Department of Finance. The Commission on Elections issues resolutions allocating the number of regular members of the Sanggunian a province may elect should a province's income classification change. First-class and second-class provinces are entitled to 10 regularly elected members, 8 for third- and fourth-class provinces and 6 for fifth- and sixth-class provinces. Exceptions to the rule are provinces which are divided into more than five congressional districts. Each Sangguniang Panlalawigan district in the provinces of Batangas, Bulacan, Cavite, Cebu, Isabela, Laguna, Negros Occidental and Pangasinan elect two members to the Sanggunian, resulting in a total number of 16 regularly elected SP members in Cavite and Cebu, 14 in Bulacan and Laguna, and 12 in the four other provinces.

The Commission on Elections apportions the number of Sanggunian members among the SP districts into which the province is divided. As much as possible, the members are equally divided among the legislative districts. If such equal division is impossible the remaining numbers are assigned to the districts with a bigger population count than the others. The COMELEC likewise factors out the population of independent cities which do not elect provincial officials in determining the apportionment of the Sanggunian members among the districts. Provinces comprising a single congressional district are divided into two sanggunian districts by the COMELEC for purposes of electing SP members.

A majority of Sangguniang Panlalawigan districts are contiguous to existing congressional districts. The exceptions are the following:

- Provinces which comprise a lone congressional district are divided into two Sanggunian districts by the COMELEC.
- Independent cities which are not allowed to participate in provincial politics are factored out of the congressional districts that contain them: Angeles from Pampanga—1st, Cotabato City from Maguindanao del Norte—Lone, Dagupan from Pangasinan—4th, Naga from Camarines Sur—3rd, Olongapo from Zambales—1st, Ormoc from Leyte—4th, Puerto Princesa from Palawan—3rd, Santiago from Isabela—4th, and Tacloban from Leyte—1st.
- The 1st and 2nd Congressional districts of Antipolo also serve de facto as SP districts of Rizal, with each being allocated one regular SP member.

There were past instances where some cities that vote for provincial officials, while given their own congressional districts by legislation, have not been separated from their former legislative districts when voting for provincial board members. However, a Supreme Court decision in 2023 entitled these cities to have a separate representation in the provincial board, as relevant laws have also provided their citizens the right to have their own representatives in the House of Representatives. Starting in 2025, these cities were assigned their own Sangguninang Panlalawigan districts. These instances were as follows:

- The 4th SP district of Bulacan encompassed the entire 4th Congressional district of Bulacan plus the city of San Jose del Monte, which in 2004 started to elect its own congressional representative.
- The 1st SP district of Laguna encompassed the entire 1st Congressional district of Laguna plus the city of Biñan, which in 2016 started to elect its own congressional representative, and the city of Santa Rosa, which in 2022 also started to elect its own congressional representative. This left out San Pedro as the only remaining city in the 1st congressional district, but the 1st SP district still contained all three cities.
- The 2nd SP district of Laguna encompassed the entire 2nd Congressional district of Laguna plus the city of Calamba, which in 2019 started to elect its own congressional representative.
- The 6th SP district of Cebu encompassed the entire 6th Congressional district of Cebu plus the city of Mandaue, which in 2022 started to elect its own congressional representative. Cities declared highly urbanized between 1987 and 1992, whose charters (as amended) explicitly permitted residents to both vote and run for elective positions in the provincial government, are allowed by Section 452-c of the Local Government Code to maintain these rights.

== List ==
The following is a table with the number of members elected from each SP district, showing the apportionment in place for the 2025 elections.

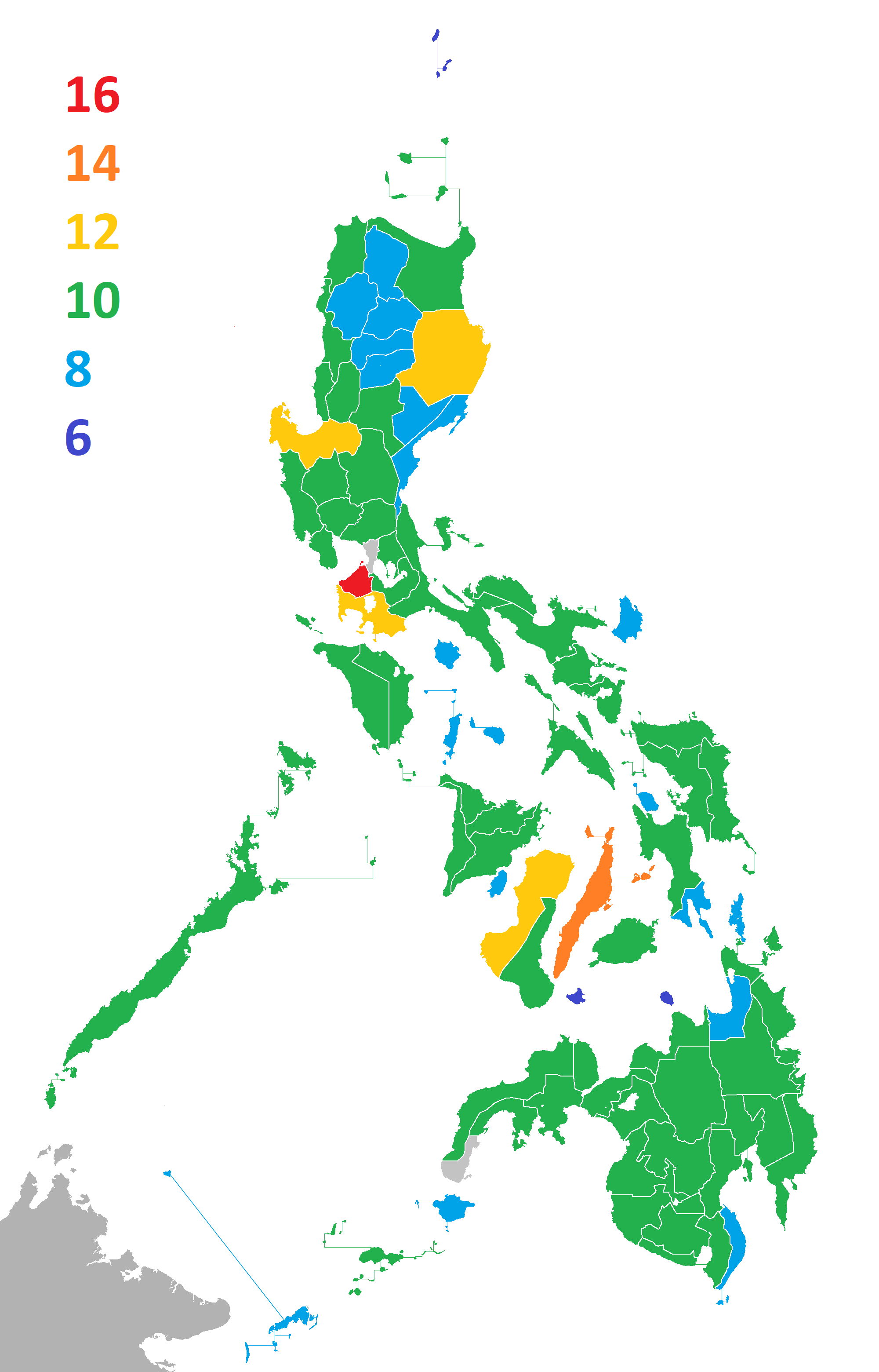
Number of regular members of each Sangguniang Panlalawigan

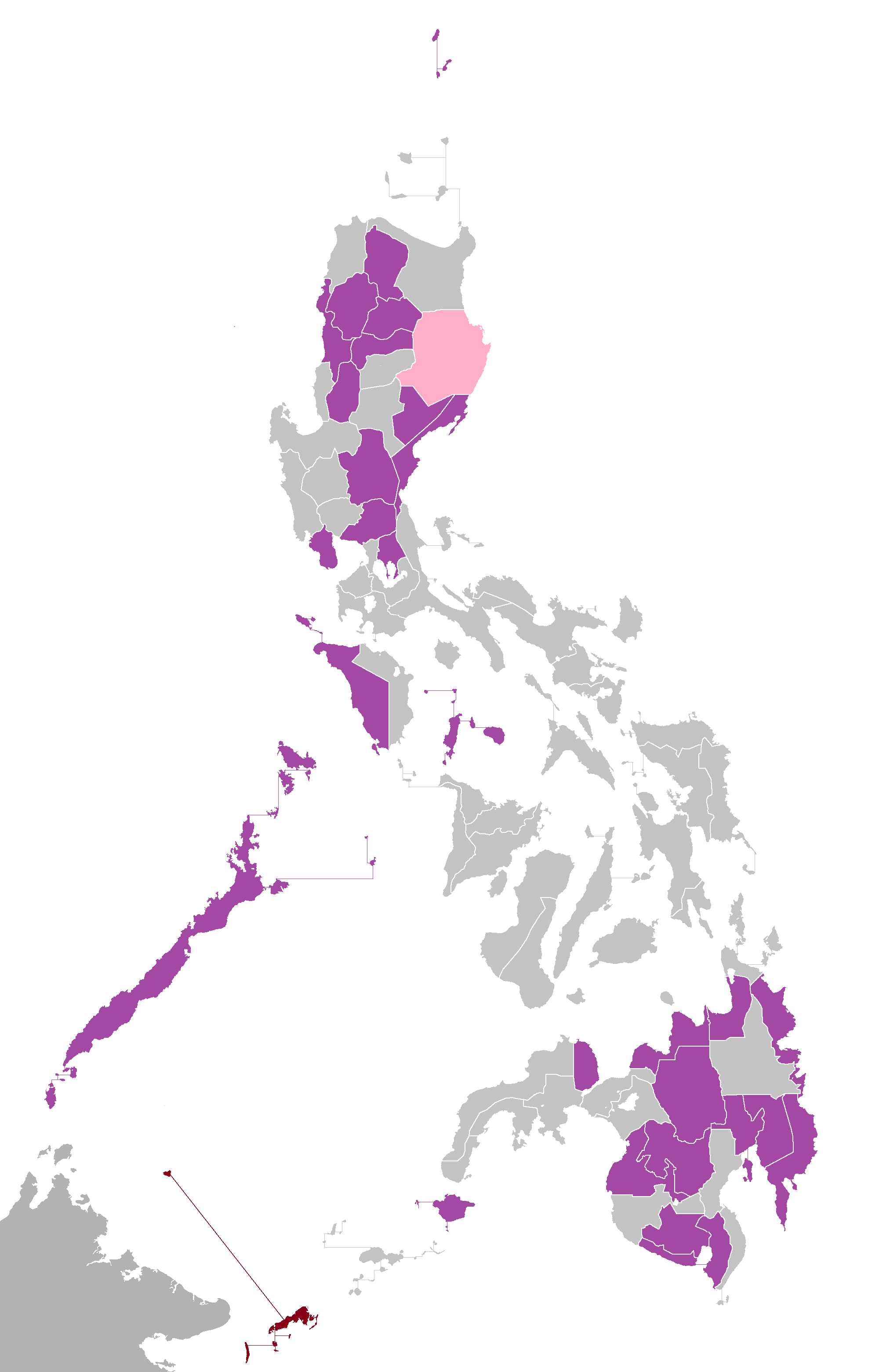
Sangguniang Panlalawigan that has a reserved seat for indigenous people (purple), for indigenous people and other sectors (pink), and for other sectors but not for indigenous people (maroon).

| Province | Article | Provincial board district | | | | | | | | Ex officio | Reserved | Total | Vice governors |
| Province | Article | 1st | 2nd | 3rd | 4th | 5th | 6th | 7th | 8th | Ex officio | Reserved | Total | Vice governors |
|---|---|---|---|---|---|---|---|---|---|---|---|---|---|
| Abra | Board | 4 | 6 | | | | | | | 3 | 1 | 14 | Ana Marie A. Bersamin |
| Agusan del Norte | Board | 5 | 5 | | | | | | | 3 | 1 | 14 | Enrico R. Corvera |
| Agusan del Sur | Board | 5 | 5 | | | | | | | 3 | 0 | 13 | Patricia Anne B. Plaza |
| Aklan | Board | 5 | 5 | | | | | | | 3 | 0 | 13 | Dexter M. Calizo |
| Albay | Board | 3 | 3 | 4 | | | | | | 3 | 0 | 13 | Farida S. Co |
| Antique | Board | 5 | 5 | | | | | | | 3 | 0 | 13 | Genevive L. Reyes |
| Apayao | Board | 5 | 5 | | | | | | | 3 | 1 | 14 | Kyle Mariah Chelsea S. Bulut-Cunan |
| Aurora | Board | 6 | 4 | | | | | | | 3 | 1 | 14 | Patrick Alexis Angara |
| Basilan | Board | 4 | 6 | | | | | | | 3 | 1 | 14 | Hadjiman Hataman Salliman |
| Bataan | Board | 3 | 3 | 4 | | | | | | 3 | 1 | 14 | Ma. Cristina M. Garcia |
| Batanes | Board | 5 | 3 | | | | | | | 3 | 1 | 12 | Jonathan Enrique V. Nanud Jr. |
| Batangas | Board | 2 | 2 | 2 | 2 | 2 | 2 | | | 3 | 0 | 15 | Hermilando I. Mandanas |
| Benguet | Board | 4 | 6 | | | | | | | 3 | 1 | 14 | Marie Rose Fongwan Kepes |
| Biliran | Board | 5 | 5 | | | | | | | 3 | 0 | 13 | Roselyn E. Paras |
| Bohol | Board | 3 | 3 | 4 | | | | | | 3 | 0 | 13 | Nicanor S. Besas |
| Bukidnon | Board | 2 | 3 | 3 | 2 | | | | | 3 | 1 | 14 | Clive D. Quiño |
| Bulacan | Board | 2 | 2 | 2 | 2 | 2 | 2 | | | 3 | 1 | 18 | Alexis C. Castro |
| Bulacan | Board | 2 | | | | | | | | 3 | 1 | 18 | Alexis C. Castro |
| Cagayan | Board | 3 | 3 | 4 | | | | | | 3 | 0 | 13 | Manuel Mamba |
| Camarines Norte | Board | 5 | 5 | | | | | | | 3 | 0 | 13 | Joseph Ascutia |
| Camarines Sur | Board | 1 | 2 | 2 | 2 | 3 | | | | 3 | 0 | 13 | Salvio Patrick Fortuno Jr. |
| Camiguin | Board | 5 | 3 | | | | | | | 3 | 0 | 11 | Rodin Romualdo |
| Capiz | Board | 5 | 5 | | | | | | | 3 | 0 | 13 | James Magbanua |
| Catanduanes | Board | 5 | 5 | | | | | | | 3 | 0 | 13 | Robert Fernandez |
| Cavite | Board | 2 | 2 | 2 | 2 | 2 | 2 | 2 | 2 | 3 | 0 | 19 | Ramon Vicente H. Bautista |
| Cebu | Board | 2 | 2 | 2 | 2 | 2 | 2 | 2 | | 3 | 0 | 19 | Glenn Anthony O. Soco |
| Cebu | Board | 2 | | | | | | | | 3 | 0 | 19 | Glenn Anthony O. Soco |
| Cotabato | Board | 4 | 3 | 3 | | | | | | 3 | 1 | 14 | Rochella Marie T. Taray |
| Davao de Oro | Board | 5 | 5 | | | | | | | 3 | 1 | 14 | Dorothy Montejo-Gonzaga |
| Davao del Norte | Board | 5 | 5 | | | | | | | 3 | 1 | 14 | Clarice T. Jubahib |
| Davao del Sur | Board | 5 | 5 | | | | | | | 3 | 1 | 14 | Marc Douglas Cagas IV |
| Davao Occidental | Board | 6 | 4 | | | | | | | 3 | 0 | 13 | Lorna Bautista-Bandigan |
| Davao Oriental | Board | 5 | 5 | | | | | | | 3 | 1 | 14 | Ma. Glenda Monette R. Gayta |
| Dinagat Islands | Board | 6 | 4 | | | | | | | 3 | 0 | 13 | Geraldine B. Ecleo |
| Eastern Samar | Board | 5 | 5 | | | | | | | 3 | 0 | 13 | Maria Caridad S. Goteesan |
| Guimaras | Board | 4 | 6 | | | | | | | 3 | 0 | 13 | Cecile C. Gamarin |
| Ifugao | Board | 6 | 4 | | | | | | | 3 | 0 | 13 | Martin L. Habawel Jr. |
| Ilocos Norte | Board | 5 | 5 | | | | | | | 3 | 0 | 13 | Matthew Joseph M. Manotoc |
| Ilocos Sur | Board | 5 | 5 | | | | | | | 3 | 1 | 14 | Ryan Luis Singson |
| Iloilo | Board | 2 | 2 | 2 | 2 | 2 | | | | 3 | 0 | 13 | Nathalie Ann F. Debuque |
| Isabela | Board | 2 | 2 | 2 | 2 | 2 | 2 | | | 3 | 3 | 18 | Francis Faustino A. Dy |
| Kalinga | Board | 4 | 6 | | | | | | | 3 | 1 | 14 | Dave Odiem |
| La Union | Board | 5 | 5 | | | | | | | 3 | 0 | 13 | Eric O. Sibuma |
| Laguna | Board | 2 | 2 | 2 | 2 | | | | | 3 | 0 | 17 | Magtangol Jose Carait III |
| Laguna | Board | 2 | | | | | | | | 3 | 0 | 17 | Magtangol Jose Carait III |
| Laguna | Board | 2 | | | | | | | | 3 | 0 | 17 | Magtangol Jose Carait III |
| Laguna | Board | 2 | | | | | | | | 3 | 0 | 17 | Magtangol Jose Carait III |
| Lanao del Norte | Board | 5 | 5 | | | | | | | 3 | 0 | 13 | Allan J. Lim |
| Lanao del Sur | Board | 5 | 5 | | | | | | | 3 | 0 | 13 | Mohammad Khalid Adiong |
| Leyte | Board | 2 | 2 | 2 | 2 | 2 | | | | 3 | 0 | 13 | Leonardo M. Javier Jr. |
| Maguindanao del Norte | Board | 4 | 4 | | | | | | | 3 | 1 | 12 | Datu Marshall I. Sinsuat |
| Maguindanao del Sur | Board | 5 | 5 | | | | | | | 3 | 1 | 14 | Hisham S. Nando |
| Marinduque | Board | 5 | 5 | | | | | | | 3 | 0 | 13 | Romulo Bacorro Jr. |
| Masbate | Board | 2 | 4 | 4 | | | | | | 3 | 0 | 13 | Fernando P. Talisic |
| Misamis Occidental | Board | 5 | 5 | | | | | | | 3 | 1 | 14 | Rowena Gutierrez |
| Misamis Oriental | Board | 5 | 5 | | | | | | | 3 | 1 | 14 | Jeremy Pelaez |
| Mountain Province | Board | 5 | 5 | | | | | | | 3 | 1 | 14 | Jose O. Dominguez |
| Negros Occidental | Board | 2 | 2 | 2 | 2 | 2 | 2 | | | 3 | 0 | 15 | Jose Benito A. Alfonso |
| Negros Oriental | Board | 3 | 4 | 3 | | | | | | 3 | 0 | 13 | Cezanne Fritz H. Diaz |
| Northern Samar | Board | 5 | 5 | | | | | | | 3 | 0 | 13 | Clarence Dato |
| Nueva Ecija | Board | 3 | 2 | 2 | 3 | | | | | 3 | 1 | 14 | Gil Raymond M. Umali |
| Nueva Vizcaya | Board | 5 | 5 | | | | | | | 3 | 0 | 13 | Eufemia Dacayo |
| Occidental Mindoro | Board | 5 | 5 | | | | | | | 3 | 1 | 14 | Anecita Diana A. Tayag |
| Oriental Mindoro | Board | 5 | 5 | | | | | | | 3 | 0 | 13 | Antonio S. Perez Jr. |
| Palawan | Board | 5 | 4 | 1 | | | | | | 3 | 1 | 14 | Leoncio Nacasi Ola |
| Pampanga | Board | 2 | 3 | 3 | 2 | | | | | 3 | 0 | 13 | Dennis G. Pineda |
| Pangasinan | Board | 2 | 2 | 2 | 2 | 2 | 2 | | | 3 | 0 | 15 | Mark Ronald Lambino |
| Quezon | Board | 2 | 3 | 2 | 3 | | | | | 3 | 0 | 13 | Anacleto Alcala III |
| Quirino | Board | 5 | 5 | | | | | | | 3 | 1 | 14 | Jojo Vaquilar |
| Rizal | Board | 4 | 2 | 1 | 1 | | | | | 3 | 1 | 14 | Josefina G. Gatlabayan |
| Rizal | Board | 1 | 1 | | | | | | | 3 | 1 | 14 | Josefina G. Gatlabayan |
| Romblon | Board | 5 | 5 | | | | | | | 3 | 1 | 14 | Armando Gutierrez |
| Samar | Board | 5 | 5 | | | | | | | 3 | 0 | 13 | Arnold Tan |
| Sarangani | Board | 4 | 6 | | | | | | | 3 | 1 | 14 | Danny A. Martinez |
| Siquijor | Board | 4 | 4 | | | | | | | 3 | 0 | 11 | Dindo A. Tumala |
| Sorsogon | Board | 5 | 5 | | | | | | | 3 | 0 | 13 | Krunimar Antonio Escudero |
| South Cotabato | Board | 3 | 3 | 4 | | | | | | 3 | 1 | 14 | Arthur Yusay Pingoy |
| Southern Leyte | Board | 5 | 5 | | | | | | | 3 | 0 | 13 | Rosa Emilia Mercado |
| Sultan Kudarat | Board | 5 | 5 | | | | | | | 3 | 0 | 13 | Prince Raden M. Sakaluran |
| Sulu | Board | 5 | 5 | | | | | | | 3 | 0 | 13 | Abdulsakur M. Tan |
| Surigao del Norte | Board | 5 | 5 | | | | | | | 3 | 0 | 13 | Eddie Gokiangkee Jr. |
| Surigao del Sur | Board | 5 | 5 | | | | | | | 3 | 1 | 14 | Manuel Alameda |
| Tarlac | Board | 3 | 4 | 3 | | | | | | 3 | 0 | 13 | Estelita M. Aquino |
| Tawi-Tawi | Board | 6 | 4 | | | | | | | 3 | 3 | 16 | Al-Syed Abdulla Sali |
| Zambales | Board | 3 | 7 | | | | | | | 3 | 0 | 13 | Jacqueline Rose Khonghun |
| Zamboanga del Norte | Board | 2 | 4 | 4 | | | | | | 3 | 0 | 13 | Julius Napigquit |
| Zamboanga del Sur | Board | 5 | 5 | | | | | | | 3 | 0 | 13 | Roseller Ariosa |
| Zamboanga Sibugay | Board | 5 | 5 | | | | | | | 3 | 0 | 13 | Richard D. Olegario |

=== Historical provinces ===
The following provinces had elected Sangguniang Panlalawigan officials who served until the provinces became defunct, or until a new set of officials for the successor provinces had been elected in the next provincial elections:

- Kalinga-Apayao
- Maguindanao (Board)
- Shariff Kabunsuan
