= Legislative districts of San Pablo =

Philippine Republic districts, 1943–1944

The legislative district of San Pablo was the representation of the city of San Pablo in the Japanese-sponsored Second Philippine Republic. As with other provinces and chartered cities at the time, the representatives of San Pablo City to the National Assembly consisted of the local chief executive (provincial governor or city mayor) acting in an ex officio capacity, and another representative indirectly elected through local conventions of KALIBAPI members during the Japanese occupation of the Philippines.

== At-Large (defunct) ==
Period	Representatives
National Assembly; 1943–1944	Sofronio Abrera
National Assembly; 1943–1944	Tomas Dizon (ex officio)

== See also ==
- Legislative districts of Laguna
