= Ilocos Norte Provincial Board =

Legislative body of the province of Ilocos Norte, Philippines

Ilocos Norte Provincial Board Sangguniang Panlalawigan ng Ilocos Norte

Type
- Type: Unicameral
- Term limits: 3 terms (9 years)

Leadership
- Presiding Officer: Matthew Manotoc, Nacionalista since June 30, 2025

Structure
- Seats: 13 board members 1 ex officio presiding officer
- Political groups: Nacionalista (7) Reporma (2) Independent (1) TBD (1) Nonpartisan (2)
- Length of term: 3 years
- Authority: Local Government Code of the Philippines

Elections
- Voting system: Multiple non-transferable vote (regular members); Indirect election (ex officio members)
- Last election: May 12, 2025
- Next election: May 15, 2028

Meeting place
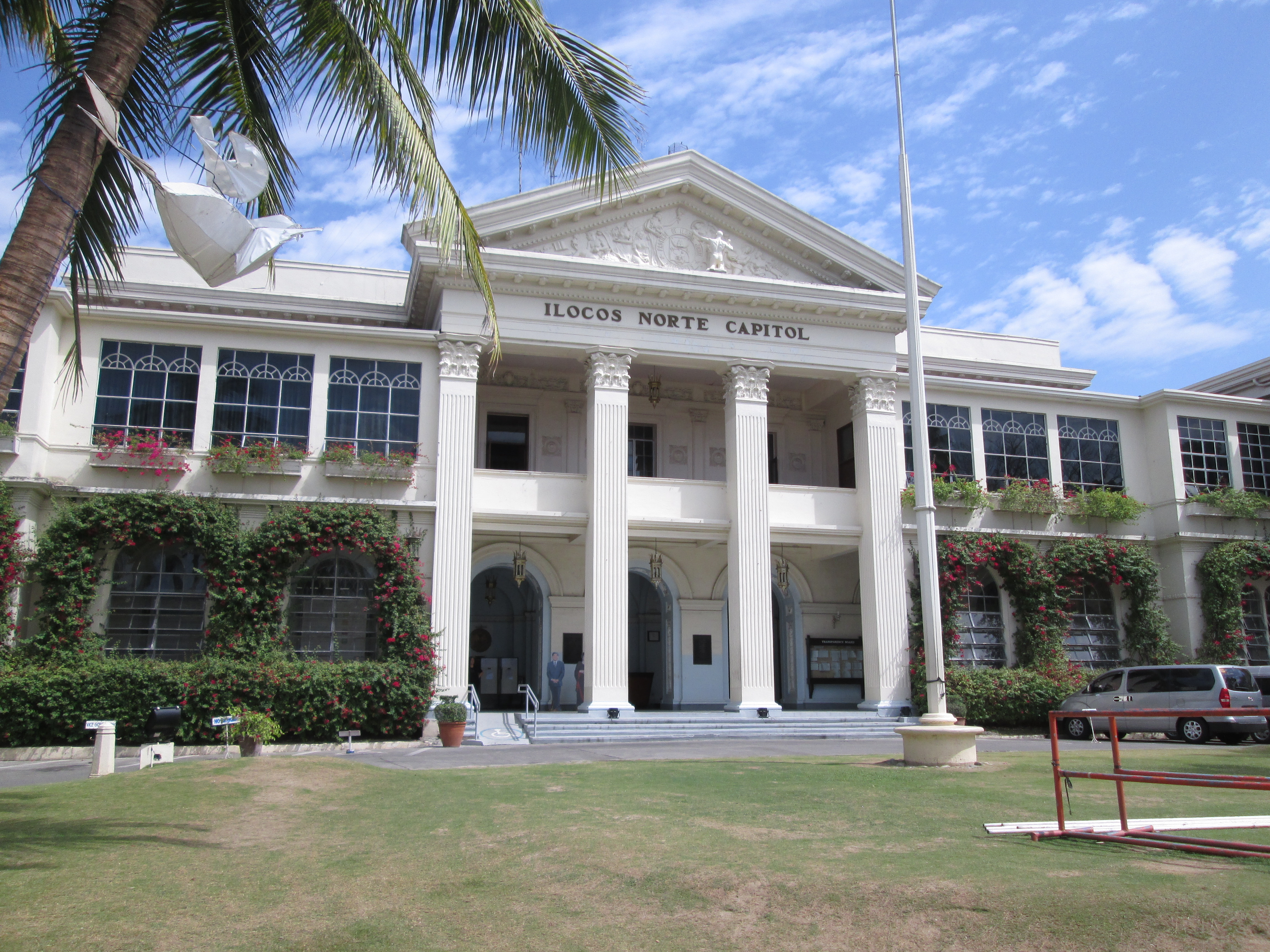
- Ilocos Norte Provincial Capitol, Laoag

The Ilocos Norte Provincial Board is the Sangguniang Panlalawigan (provincial legislature) of the Philippine province of Ilocos Norte.

The members are elected via plurality-at-large voting: the province is divided into two districts, each having five seats. A voter votes up to five names, with the top five candidates per district being elected. The vice governor is the ex officio presiding officer, and only votes to break ties. The vice governor is elected via the plurality voting system province-wide.

The districts used in appropriation of members is coextensive with the legislative districts of Ilocos Norte.

Aside from the regular members, the board also includes the provincial federation presidents of the Liga ng mga Barangay (ABC, from its old name "Association of Barangay Captains"), the Sangguniang Kabataan (SK, youth councils) and the Philippine Councilors League (PCL).

== Apportionment ==
Elections	Seats per district		Ex officio seats	Total seats
Elections	1st	2nd	Ex officio seats	Total seats
2010–present	5	5	3	13

== List of members ==
=== Current members ===
These are the members after the 2025 local elections and 2023 barangay and SK elections:

- Vice Governor: Matthew Manotoc (Nacionalista)

Seat	Board member	Party	Start of term	End of term
1st district	Roger John C. Fariñas II	Reporma	June 30, 2025	June 30, 2028
1st district	Johanson T. Chua	Nacionalista	June 30, 2025	June 30, 2028
1st district	Rodolfo Christian G. Fariñas III	Reporma	June 30, 2019	June 30, 2028
1st district	Marlon Ferdinand T. Sales	Nacionalista	June 30, 2025	June 30, 2028
1st district	Saul Paulo A. Lazo	Nacionalista	June 30, 2019	June 30, 2028
2nd district	Rafael Salvador C. Medina	Nacionalista	June 30, 2022	June 30, 2028
2nd district	Joefrey P. Saguid	Nacionalista	June 30, 2025	June 30, 2028
2nd district	Medeldorf M. Gaoat	Nacionalista	June 30, 2019	June 30, 2028
2nd district	Giancarlo Angelo S. Crisostomo	Nacionalista	June 30, 2022	June 30, 2028
2nd district	Aladine T. Santos	Independent	June 30, 2019	June 30, 2028
ABC	Ryan John Pascua	Nonpartisan	January 12, 2024	January 1, 2026
PCL	TBD			June 30, 2028
SK	Eldritze Viernes	Nonpartisan	November 29, 2023	January 1, 2026

=== Vice Governor ===
Election year	Name	Party	Ref.
2016	Eugenio Angelo M. Barba	Nacionalista	
2019	Cecilia Marcos	Nacionalista	
2022	Cecilia Marcos	Nacionalista	
2025	Matthew Manotoc	Nacionalista	

=== 1st District ===
- Population (2024):

Election year	Member (party)	Member (party)	Member (party)	Member (party)	Member (party)	Ref.
2016	Ria Christina Fariñas (Liberal)	Juan Conrado A. Respicio, II (Nacionalista)	Vicentito M. Lazo (Natcionalista)	Rogelio Balbag (Nacionalista)	Donald G. Nicolas (Nacionalista)	
2019	Rodolfo Christian G. Fariñas III (PDP–Laban)	Franklin Dante A. Respicio (Nacionalista)	Saul Paulo A. Lazo (Nacionalista)	Portia Pamela R. Salenda (Nacionalista)	Donald G. Nicolas (Nacionalista)	
2022	Rodolfo Christian G. Fariñas III (PDP–Laban)	Franklin Dante A. Respicio (Nacionalista)	Saul Paulo A. Lazo (Nacionalista)	Portia Pamela R. Salenda (Nacionalista)	Donald G. Nicolas (Nacionalista)	
2025	Rodolfo Christian G. Fariñas III (Reporma)	Roger John C. Fariñas (Reporma)	Saul Paulo A. Lazo (Nacionalista)	Johanson T. Chua (Nacionalista)	Marlon Ferdinand T. Sales (Nacionalista)	

=== 2nd District ===
- Population (2024):

Election year	Member (party)	Member (party)	Member (party)	Member (party)	Member (party)	Ref.
2016	Matthew Manotoc (Nacionalista)	Mariano V. Marcos, II (Nacionalista)	Ramon M. Gaoat (Natcionalista)	Da Vinci M. Crisostomo (Nacionalista)	James Paul Nalupta (Nacionalista)	
2019	Medeldorf M. Gaoat (Nacionalista)	Domingo C. Ambrosio, Jr. (Nacionalista)	Aladine T. Santos (PDP–Laban)	Da Vinci M. Crisostomo (Nacionalista)	James Paul Nalupta (Nacionalista)	
2022	Medeldorf M. Gaoat (Nacionalista)	Rafael Salvador C. Medina (Nacionalista)	Aladine T. Santos (Independent)	Giancarlo Angelo S. Crisostomo (Nacionalista)	Jonathan O. Torralba (Nacionalista)	
2025	Medeldorf M. Gaoat (Nacionalista)	Rafael Salvador C. Medina (Nacionalista)	Aladine T. Santos (Independent)	Giancarlo Angelo S. Crisostomo (Nacionalista)	Joefrey P. Saguid (Nacionalista)	
