= Matthew Manotoc =

Filipino politician (born 1988)

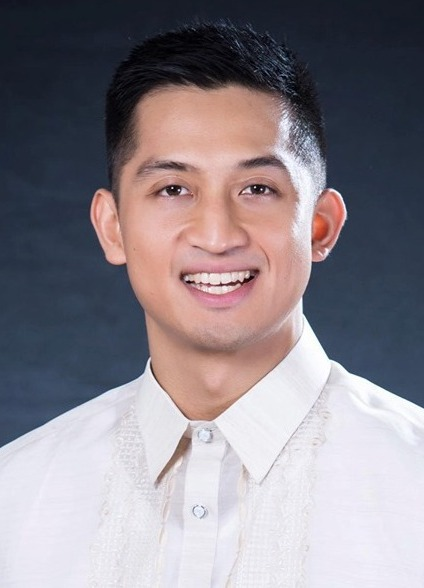
- Official portrait, 2019

Vice Governor of Ilocos Norte
- Incumbent
- Assumed office June 30, 2025
- Governor: Cecilia Marcos
- Preceded by: Cecilia Marcos

27th Governor of Ilocos Norte
- In office June 30, 2019 – June 30, 2025
- Vice Governor: Cecilia Marcos
- Preceded by: Imee Marcos
- Succeeded by: Cecilia Marcos

Member of the Ilocos Norte Provincial Board from the 2nd district
- In office June 30, 2016 – June 30, 2019

Chairman of the National Movement of Young Legislators Ilocos Norte Chapter
- In office 2016–2019

Personal details
- Born: Matthew Joseph Marcos Manotoc (Note: His official documents use his mother's maiden name, Marcos.); December 9, 1988 (age 37) Lisbon, Portugal
- Party: Nacionalista (2015–present)
- Spouse: Jamie Herrell (m. 2026)
- Relations: Marcos family Romualdez family
- Parents: Tommy Manotoc (father); Imee Marcos (mother)
- Relatives: TJ Manotoc (half-brother)
- Education: Claremont McKenna College (BA)
- Occupation: Politician, athlete, sports manager

Matthew Joseph Marcos Manotoc (born December 9, 1988) is a Filipino politician and athlete who is currently serving as the vice governor of Ilocos Norte since 2025, he previously served as the governor of the same province from 2019 to 2025. He was a senior provincial board member from the second legislative district of Ilocos Norte from 2016 to 2019.

He is a member of the Marcos political family. His maternal grandfather, Ferdinand Marcos, was a former president of the Philippines, His maternal grandmother Imelda Marcos, was a first Lady of the Philippines. His mother, Imee Marcos, currently serves as a senator, while his maternal uncle, Ferdinand "Bongbong" Marcos, is the sitting president.

== Early life and education ==
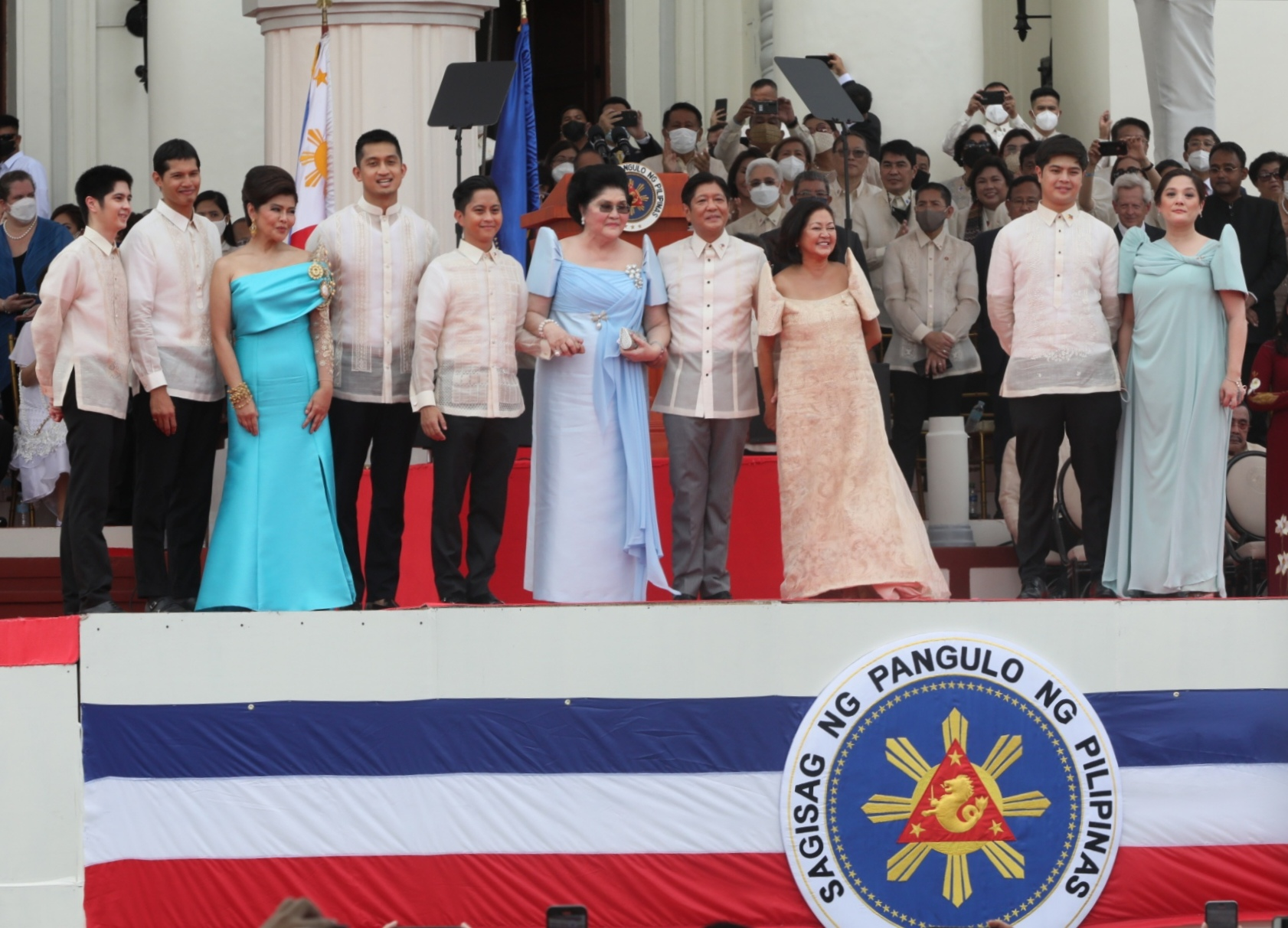
The Family of Bongbong Marcos present during his presidential inauguration

Manotoc was born on December 9, 1988, as the youngest son of Imee Romualdez Marcos and Tommy La'O Manotoc. His parents were in exile in Morocco at the time of his birth, reportedly using false passports.

Manotoc graduated from International School Manila. In 2006, he moved to the United States to study psychology at Claremont McKenna College. He later attended a short course in sports management at the University of California-Los Angeles in 2014 and a short course in management development at the Asian Institute of Management in 2017. In 2018, he took a short course in Harnessing Organizational and Individual Capacities for Excellent Services in Local Government Units at the University of the Philippines-Diliman. In 2021, he pursued an executive course in Agricultural Development at Mariano Marcos State University in Batac. In 2023, he attended the Stanford Graduate School of Business at the National University of Singapore.

== Political career ==
=== Ilocos Norte Provincial Board (2016–2019) ===
Manotoc ran as a provincial board member representing the 2nd legislative district of Ilocos Norte in the 2016 Philippine local elections. Manotoc won the election and was declared to be the Senior Provincial Board Member of Ilocos Norte. His mother Imee Marcos, was governor of Ilocos Norte during his campaign and was running uncontested for her third and final term in the 2016 gubernatorial elections. From 2016 to 2019, Manotoc was also chairman of the National Movement of Young Legislators – Ilocos Norte Chapter.

=== Governor of Ilocos Norte (2019–2025) ===
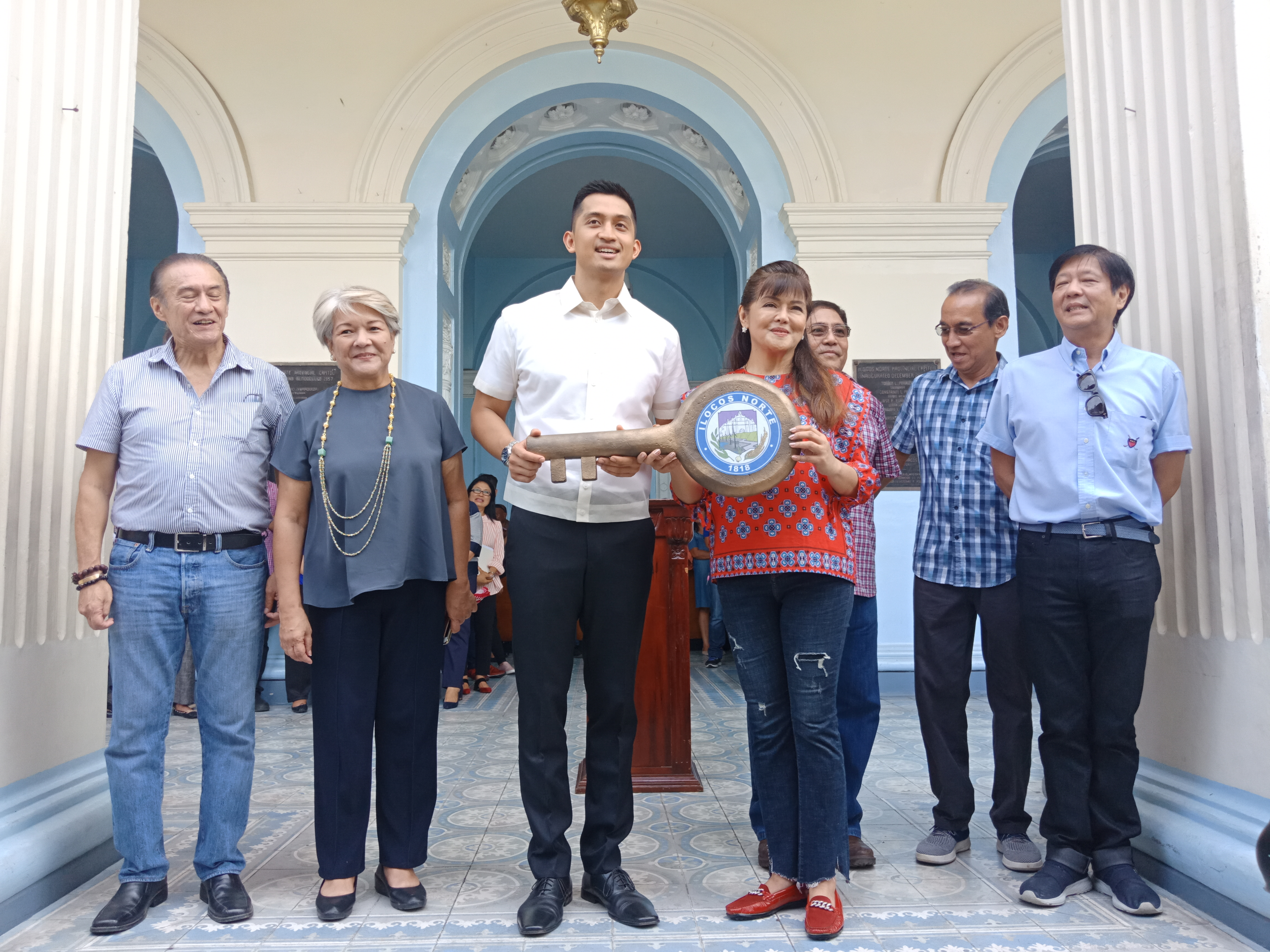
Manotoc receiving the Key of Responsibility from his mother, outgoing Governor and Senator-elect Imee Marcos, during the turn-over ceremony at the Ilocos Norte Provincial Capitol in Laoag in 2019

In October 2018, Manotoc filed his Certificate of Candidacy to run for vice governor of Ilocos Norte in the 2019 Philippine gubernatorial elections as the running mate of his grandmother, Imelda Marcos. However, Marcos withdrew from the race in November 2018 following her graft conviction, and Manotoc was named as her substitute. He won the race unopposed after Rodolfo Fariñas withdrew days before the election, succeeding his mother, who had successfully run for senator.

In 2022, Manotoc announced that nearly ₱700 million was allocated to Ilocos Norte's health system as part of the Provincial Government's efforts to improve health services in the province. Over ₱650 million was used for infrastructure, while ₱35 million was dedicated to purchasing COVID-19 and other infectious disease response logistics, including medicines, emergency medical equipment and supplies, personal protective equipment, testing kits, and vaccines.

Manotoc also founded "Speak Up, I’m Here," a mental health center and hotline that serves locals dealing with isolation, pressure, and other challenges. The center has provided services to various groups, including adolescents, frontliners, returning residents, and COVID-19 patients in isolation. Additionally, he launched the "Search for the Best Mental Health Practices" initiative, which emphasizes a community-based approach to mental health, as well as offering art therapy sessions, mental health break camps, and psychosocial support training.

In support of preventive healthcare, Manotoc advocated for the creation of new parks in the province, including barangay eco-parks. Each barangay was allocated ₱200,000 to establish or improve its park, including a vegetable farm.

The provincial government also implemented several agricultural projects, such as farm-to-market roads, small farm reservoirs, water impounding projects, multi-purpose drying pavements, tractors, combine harvesters, tobacco curing barns, and a focus on shifting to high-value crops, with investments worth billions of pesos.

During the African Swine Fever outbreak, Manotoc ordered the provincial government to take immediate action to trace contacts and prevent the spread of infections. He initiated the distribution of relief packs to those affected, provided sprayers and disinfectants, facilitated indemnifications or payouts, allocated funds for uninsured individuals, and supported alternative livelihoods to protect the livestock sector.

The Provincial Government launched "Agri ka Dito," a flagship program under the Office of the Governor that aimed to support community farmers and fisherfolk by providing immediate assistance in response to rising agricultural input costs.

At the height of the COVID-19 pandemic, the Provincial Board passed ordinances allocating Php 370 million in cash to support vulnerable Ilokanos. This financial assistance was provided through cash-for-work programs, emergency livelihood support, "pay now, work later" schemes, interest-free loans, and skills training programs. Micro, small, and medium enterprises received financial aid, microfinancing packages, livelihood starter kits, and equipment. In 2021 alone, the Provincial Government allocated Php 40 million in cash to local entrepreneurs. Additionally, Manotoc waived the governor’s Developmental Fees for non-essential businesses affected by the pandemic.

Under Manotoc’s leadership, Ilocos Norte became the first and only province to receive a safe travel stamp from the World Travel and Tourism Council.

Manotoc also provided accident insurance policies for public utility vehicle drivers and increased financial assistance for nearly 4,000 drivers, in addition to over ₱40 million in cash aid in 2021, to help them during the global energy crisis.

Furthermore, he led the "Bike-to-Work" initiative, encouraging employees to adopt environmentally friendly and convenient alternative transportation through cycling activities.

=== Vice Governor of Ilocos Norte (2025–present) ===
On October 1, 2024, Manotoc initially filed his candidacy for his third and final consecutive term as governor of Ilocos Norte in 2025. However, on October 8, he withdrew his candidacy and instead filed for Vice Governor. In his stead, incumbent Vice Governor Cecilia Araneta-Marcos filed her candidacy for Governor, with him as her running mate. Manotoc ran unopposed and won.

== Personal life ==
Manotoc is the grandchild of President Ferdinand Marcos and former First Lady Imelda Marcos.

His uncle, Ferdinand "Bongbong" Marcos Jr., is the current President of the Philippines since 2022.

Manotoc is both a golfer and a basketball player. He was a basketball coach at the International School Manila and a co-founder of Espiritu Manotoc Basketball Management.

In 2019, it was reported that he was dating Miss Earth 2014 Jamie Herrell. In 2025, they became engaged. On January 9, 2026, Manotoc is married to Jamie Herrell at the Cebu Metropolitan Cathedral.

== Electoral history ==
Electoral history of Matthew Manotoc
Year	Office	Party	Votes received				Result
Year	Office	Party	Total	%	P.	Swing	Result
2016	Board Member (Ilocos Norte–2nd)	Nacionalista	125,658	—N/a	1st	—N/a	Won
2019	Governor of Ilocos Norte	Nacionalista	260,938	90.01%	1st	—N/a	Won
2022	Governor of Ilocos Norte	Nacionalista	261,885	73.51%	1st	—N/a	Won
2025	Vice Governor of Ilocos Norte	Nacionalista	313,943	100.00%	1st	—N/a	Unopposed

== Notes ==
Political offices
Preceded by Imee Marcos	Governor of Ilocos Norte; 2019–2025	Succeeded by Cecilia Marcos
Preceded by Cecilia Marcos	Vice Governor of Ilocos Norte; 2025–present	Incumbent
