= Parian, Calamba =

Barangay Parian
- Urbanized Barangay (Third Class Barangay)
- Barangay ng Parian, Lungsod ng Calamba
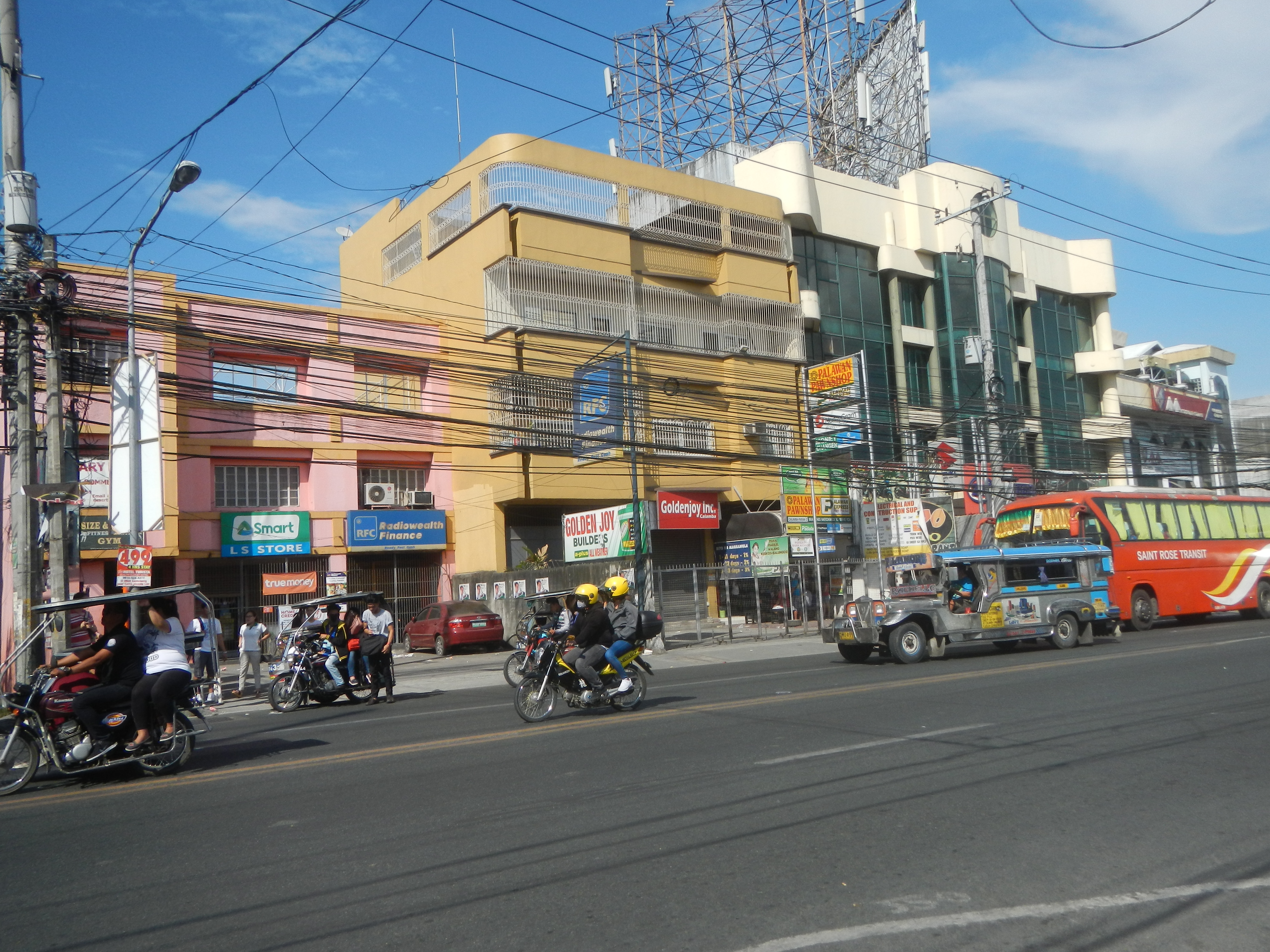
- Establishments in Parian, Calamba
- Map of Calamba showing the location of the barangays
- Coordinates: 14°12′54″N 121°8′5″E
- Country: Philippines
- Province: Laguna
- Region: Calabarzon (Region IV-A)
- City: Calamba

Government
  - Chairman: Rodnie P. Perez
  - Councilors: Aurea C. Gobangco; Ma. Ursula V. Santos; Mario F. Diamante; Ruben U. Lirio; Rachelle DC. Aguilar; Federico A. Magora; Nicolas B. Carola

Area
  - Land: 1.120 km^{2} (0.432 sq mi)

Population (2020)
  - Total: 25,558
  - Density: 22,820/km^{2} (59,100/sq mi)

Parian is an urban barangay in Calamba, Laguna, Philippines, located at the point of Manila South Rd.-Calamba National Highway.

== Education ==
Pre-elementary to Secondary

- Parian Elementary School

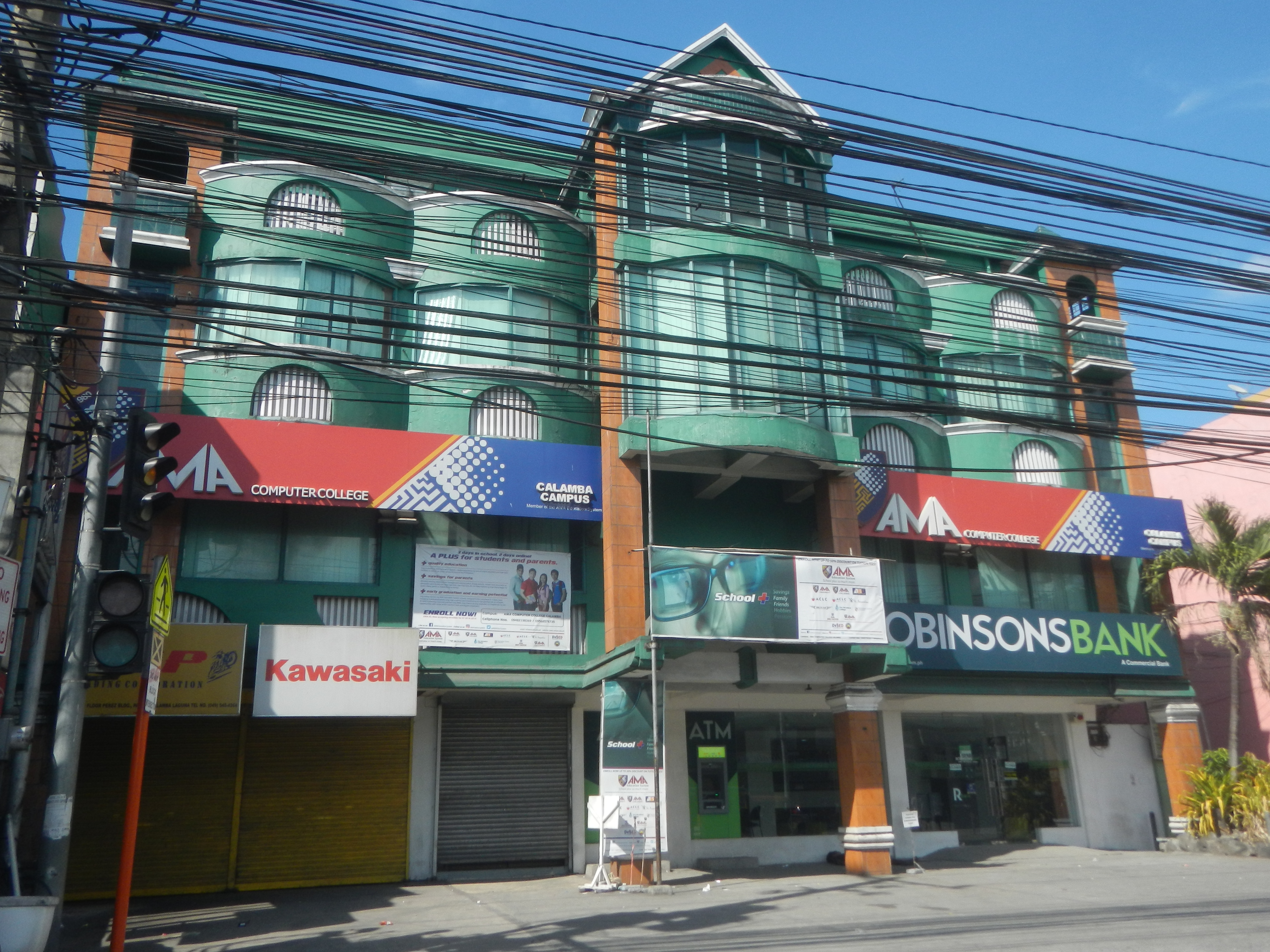
A AMA Computer College Calamba Campus

College

- AMA Computer College - Calamba Campus
- Calamba Doctors' College
- Rizal College Laguna
- STI Parian - Calamba
- Calamba Doctors' College

== Establishments ==
- Calamba Doctors' College
- Commercial Building - Parian
- Commercial Building - Parian-Paciano Bridge
- Gawad Kalinga Building
- Lianas Supermarket Parian
- MegaHealth - Parian
- Munda Motorworks Center
- Motorcycle Honda Motors - Parian
- River View Resort - Parian
- Rizal College - Calamba
- Save More Store - Parian
- Social Security System (SSS) - Calamba Branch
- Yamaha Calamba - Parian Branch

== Population ==
Population census of Brgy. Parian
Year	Pop.	±% p.a.
1980	5,491	—
1990	10,278	+6.47%
1995	10,767	+0.87%
2000	13,594	+5.12%
2007	19,587	+5.17%
2010	20,248	+1.22%
2015	22,072	+1.66%
2020	25,558	+3.13%
2024	27,378	+1.67%

== Hospital ==
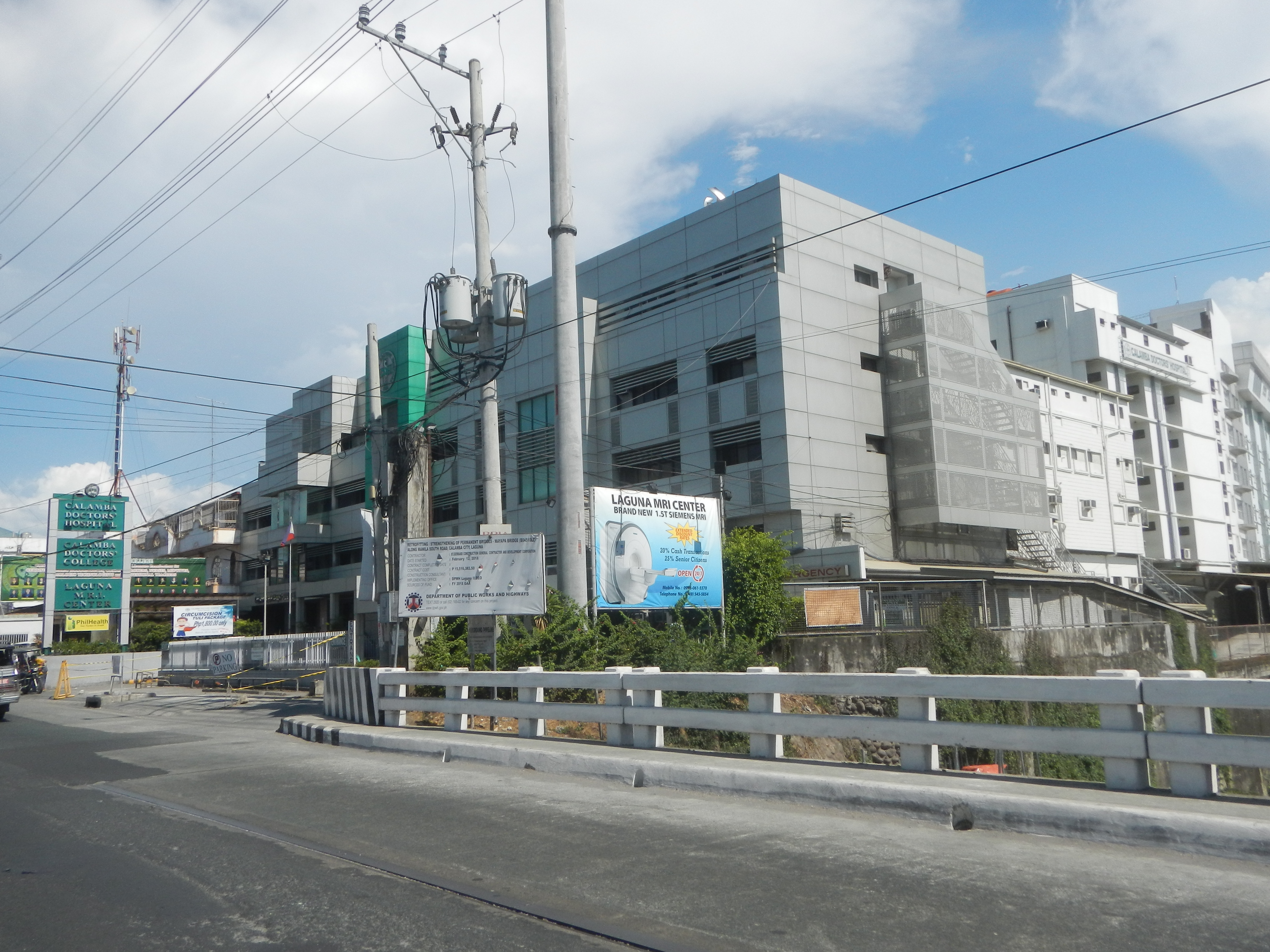
A Calamba Doctors' Hospital & College in National Road, Parian

Calamba Doctors' Hospital, is a private hospital located at the northern portion of the city, situated at the Check Point-Bridge and National Highway intersection. It has a private school beside the hospital called "Calamba Doctors' College".
