= Governor of Ilocos Norte =

Local chief executive

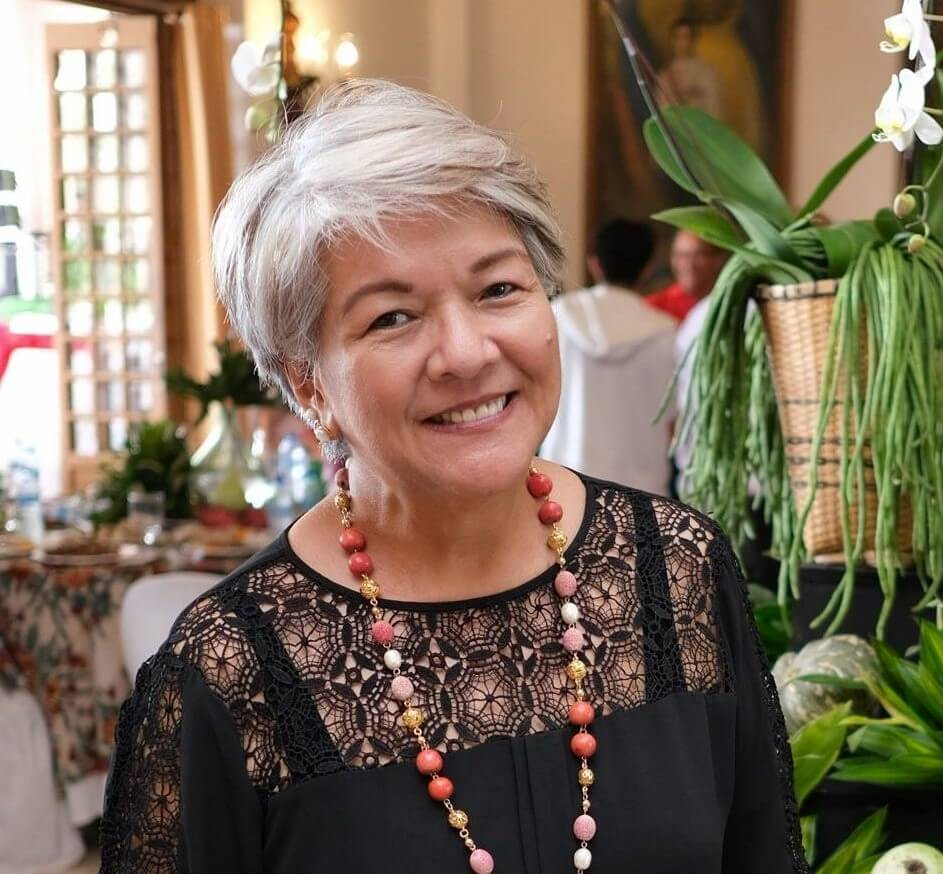
- Incumbent; Cecilia Marcos since June 30, 2025
- Style: Honorable
- Residence: Ilocos Norte Provincial Capitol
- Term length: 3 years, not eligible for re-election immediately after three consecutive terms
- Formation: 1818 (Spanish era), 1901 (American era)

The governor of Ilocos Norte (Filipino: Punong Panlalawigan ng Ilocos Norte), is the chief executive of the provincial government of Ilocos Norte. Since 1998 the position has been occupied by a member of the Marcos political family.

== List of governors of Ilocos Norte ==
No.	Image	Governor	Term
1		Aguedo Agbayani	1901–1902
2		Elias Villanueva	1902
3		Julio Agcaoili	1902–1906
4		Melchor Flor	1906–1908
5		Policarpo Soriano	1908–1909
6		Simeon Mandac	1910
7		Melchor Flor	1910–1916
8		Florencio Castro	1916–1919
9		Cayetano Ligot	1919–1922
10		Severo Hernando	1922–1925
11		Domingo J. Samonte Jr.	1925–1931
12		Simeon Mandac	1931–1934
13		Santiago Espiritu	1934–1937
14		Roque Ablan Sr.	1937–1943
15		Primo Lazaro	1947–1951
16		Damaso T. Samonte	1951–1955
17		Antonio V. Raquiza	1955–1957
18		Jose E. Evangelista	1960–1971
19		Elizabeth Marcos-Keon	1971–1983
20		Bongbong Marcos	1983–1986
21		Castor Raval	1986–1987
22		Vicente Campos	1987–1988
23		Rodolfo Fariñas	1988–1998
24		Bongbong Marcos	1998–2007
25		Michael Marcos Keon	2007–2010
26		Imee Marcos	2010–2019
27		Matthew Manotoc	2019–2025
28		Cecilia Marcos	2025–present
