= Legislative districts of Laguna =

Legislative Districts of the Philippines

The legislative districts of Laguna are the representations of the province of Laguna in the various national legislatures of the Philippines. The province is currently represented in the lower house of the Congress of the Philippines through its first, second, third, and fourth congressional districts.

Legislative districts of Laguna.

The component cities of Biñan, Calamba, and Santa Rosa, while remaining integral parts of the province, granted their separate congressional representations in 2015, 2018, and 2019, respectively. They later gained representation in the provincial board in 2024.

== History ==
Laguna initially elected four representatives, at large, to the Malolos Congress in 1898. It was later divided into two representative districts in 1907 for the Philippine Assembly.

When seats for the upper house of the Philippine Legislature were elected from territory-based districts between 1916 and 1935, the province formed part of the fourth senatorial district which elected two out of the 24-member senate.

By virtue of Executive Orders No. 84 and 103 issued by Philippine Executive Commission Chairman Jorge Vargas in 1942, the municipality of Infanta (including what is now General Nakar and Real) and the Polillo Islands were transferred to Laguna's jurisdiction, a setup which only lasted for the duration of the Second World War. Two delegates represented the expanded province in the National Assembly of the Japanese-sponsored Second Philippine Republic: one was the provincial governor (an ex officio member), while the other was elected through a provincial assembly of KALIBAPI members during the Japanese occupation of the Philippines. San Pablo, being a chartered city, was represented separately in this short-lived legislative body. Upon the restoration of the Philippine Commonwealth in 1945, the province retained its two pre-war representative districts.

The province was represented in the Interim Batasang Pambansa as part of Region IV-A from 1978 to 1984, and elected four representatives, at large, to the Regular Batasang Pambansa in 1984. Laguna was reapportioned into four congressional districts under the new Constitution which was proclaimed on February 11, 1987, and elected members to the restored House of Representatives starting that same year.

The passage of Republic Act No. 10658 on March 27, 2015 separated from the first district the city of Biñan, which first elected its separate representative beginning in the 2016 elections. However, for the purposes of electing Sangguniang Panlalawigan members, Biñan remains part of the province's 1st Sangguniang Panlalawigan District.

The passage of Republic Act No. 11078 on July 23, 2018 separated from the second district the city of Calamba, which elected its separate representative beginning in the 2019 elections. However, for the purposes of electing Sangguniang Panlalawigan members, Calamba remains part of the province's 2nd Sangguniang Panlalawigan District.

The passage of Republic Act No. 11395 on August 28, 2019 separated from the first district the city of Santa Rosa, which first elected its separate representative beginning in the 2022 elections. However, for the purposes of electing Sangguniang Panlalawigan members, Santa Rosa remains part of the province's 1st Sangguniang Panlalawigan District.

In 2024, the lone congressional districts of Biñan, Calamba, and Santa Rosa were granted separate representations in the Laguna Provincial Board effective 2025.

== Current districts ==
The province was last redistricted in 2021, wherein the legislative district of Santa Rosa was created out of the 1st district. The province's current congressional delegation composes of four members. All incumbent representatives are part of the majority bloc.

Lakas–CMD (3)
PFP (1)

Legislative districts and representatives of Laguna
District	Current Representative		Party	Constituent LGUs	Population (2024)	Area	Map
District	Image	Name	Party	Constituent LGUs	Population (2024)	Area	Map
1st		Ann Matibag (since 2022); San Pedro	Lakas–CMD	List: San Pedro	348,968	24.05 km²	
2nd		Ramil Hernandez (since 2025); Bay	Lakas–CMD	List: Bay; Cabuyao; Los Baños	552,034	140.28 km²	
3rd		Loreto Amante (since 2022); San Pablo	Lakas–CMD	List: Alaminos; Calauan; Liliw; Nagcarlan; Rizal; San Pablo; Victoria	611,539	487.87 km²	
4th		Benjamin Agarao Jr. (since 2025); Santa Cruz	PFP	List: Cavinti; Famy; Kalayaan; Luisiana; Lumban; Mabitac; Magdalena; Majayjay; Paete; Pagsanjan; Pakil; Pangil; Pila; Santa Cruz; Santa Maria; Siniloan	582,052	1,017.91 km²	

== Historical districts ==
=== At-Large (defunct) ===
==== 1898–1899 ====
Period	Representatives
Malolos Congress; 1898–1899	Higinio Benitez
Malolos Congress; 1898–1899	Graciano Cordero
Malolos Congress; 1898–1899	Manuel Sityar
Malolos Congress; 1898–1899	Mauricio Ilagan

==== 1943–1944 ====
- includes Infanta and Polillo Islands; excludes San Pablo

Period	Representatives
National Assembly; 1943–1944	Marcelo P. Zorilla
National Assembly; 1943–1944	Jesus Bautista (ex officio)

==== 1984–1986 ====
Period	Representatives
Regular Batasang Pambansa; 1984–1986	Arturo D. Brion
Regular Batasang Pambansa; 1984–1986	Rustico F. De Los Reyes, Jr.
Regular Batasang Pambansa; 1984–1986	Wenceslao R. Lagumbay
Regular Batasang Pambansa; 1984–1986	Luis A. Yulo

== See also ==
- Legislative district of Santa Rosa
- Legislative district of San Pablo
- Legislative district of Biñan
- Legislative district of Calamba
