= Legislative districts of Santa Rosa =

Legislative district of the Philippines

The legislative district of Santa Rosa is the representation of the component city of Santa Rosa, Laguna in the Congress of the Philippines. The city is represented in the lower house of the Congress through its lone congressional district since 2022.

== History ==
Santa Rosa was represented as part of the at-large district of Laguna in the Malolos Congress (1898–1899), National Assembly of the Second Philippine Republic (1943–1944) and Regular Batasang Pambansa (1984–1986) and the first district of Laguna from 1907 to 1941, 1945–1972, and 1987–2022. The province of Laguna was represented in the Interim Batasang Pambansa as part of Region IV-A from 1978 to 1984.

On August 28, 2019, Santa Rosa was granted its own representation in the House of Representatives beginning in 2022 by virtue of Republic Act No. 11395. The city's residents still voted as part of the province's 1st Sangguniang Panlalawigan district for the purpose of electing Provincial Board members in 2022, before the city was granted its own representation in the Provincial Board to elect two members separately starting in 2025.

== Lone District ==
The city's current representative is a member of the National Unity Party who is part of the majority bloc in the 19th Congress.

Lakas–CMD (1)

Legislative Districts and Congressional Representatives of Santa Rosa, Laguna
District	Current Representative	Residency	Barangays	Population (2024)	Area
Lone	Roy Gonzales (since 2025)	Balibago	List: Aplaya; Balibago; Caingin; Dila; Dita; Don Jose; Ibaba; Kanluran; Labas; Macabling; Malitlit; Malusak; Market Area; Pooc; Pulong Santa Cruz; Santo Domingo; Sinalhan; Tagapo	430,920	54.84 km^{2}

== Election result ==
=== 2022 ===
2022 Philippine House of Representatives elections
Party	Candidate	Votes	%
NUP	Danilo "Dan" Fernandez	104,772	64.09
KBL	Petronio Factoriza, Jr.	58,704	35.91
Total votes		163,476	100.00
NUP win (new seat)			

== See also ==
- Legislative districts of Laguna
