= Cecilia Marcos (politician) =

Filipino politician

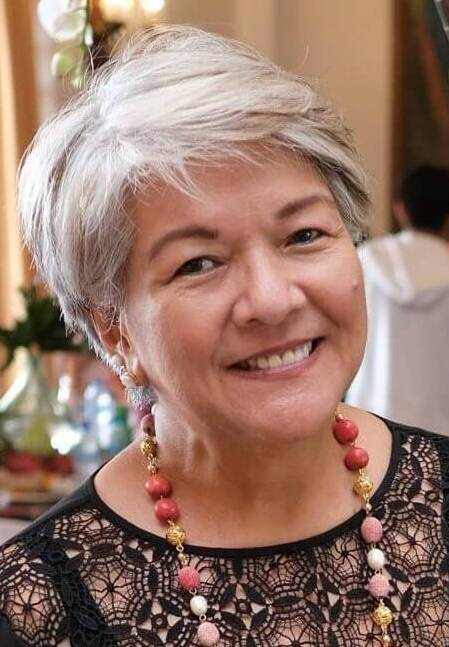

28th Governor of Ilocos Norte
- Incumbent
- Assumed office June 30, 2025
- Vice Governor: Matthew Manotoc
- Preceded by: Matthew Manotoc

Vice Governor of Ilocos Norte
- In office June 30, 2019 – June 30, 2025
- Governor: Matthew Manotoc
- Preceded by: Eugenio Angelo Barba
- Succeeded by: Matthew Manotoc

Personal details
- Born: Cecilia Narciso Araneta; January 5, 1956 (age 70) Zamboanga City, Zamboanga del Sur, Philippines
- Party: Nacionalista
- Spouse: Mariano "Nonong" Marcos II (died 2019)
- Relatives: Marcos family
- Occupation: Politician

Cecilia "Cecile" Narciso Araneta Marcos is a Filipino politician who was elected Governor of Ilocos Norte in 2025.

She is the widow of the late former Provincial Board Member Mariano "Nonong" Marcos II, a first cousin of President Ferdinand "Bongbong" Marcos, Jr. and who served as a member of the Ilocos Norte Provincial Board from 2004-2013 and 2016-2019.

She was elected vice governor in 2019, substituting her husband, who died from cardiac arrest during the campaign, then running unopposed for vice-governor.

In 2024, she withdrew her reelection bid for vice governor and exchanged candidacies with her nephew, the then outgoing governor Matthew Manotoc.

== See also ==
- List of current Philippine governors

Political offices
Preceded by Matthew Manotoc	Governor of Ilocos Norte; 2025–present	Incumbent
Preceded by Eugenio Angelo Barba	Vice Governor of Ilocos Norte; 2019–2025	Succeeded by Matthew Manotoc
