= Legislative districts of Biñan =

Legislative district of the Philippines

The legislative districts of Biñan are the representations of the component city of Biñan in the Congress of the Philippines. The city is currently represented in the lower house of the Congress through its lone congressional district.

== History ==
Biñan was represented in the Congress as part of the at-large district of Laguna in the Malolos Congress (1898–1899), National Assembly of the Second Philippine Republic (1943–1944) and Regular Batasang Pambansa (1984–1986) and the first district of Laguna from 1907–1941, 1945–1972, and 1987–2016. The province of Laguna was represented in the Interim Batasang Pambansa as part of Region IV-A from 1978 to 1984.

The President of the Republic of the Philippines signed on March 27, 2015 by the Republic Act No. 10658, separating Biñan from the first district of the province. The cities of San Pedro and Santa Rosa remained in the first district.

The city elected its first representative in the 2016 elections. However, for the purpose of electing Provincial Board members, the city's residents voted as part of the province's 1st Sangguniang Panlalawigan district up to 2022. The city was granted its own district in the provincial board effective 2025, electing two members.

In 2025, Representative Walfredo Dimaguila Jr. filed House Bill No. 1562, which seeks to divide into two legislative districts due to the city's growing population. The first district shall comprise the northern barangays Canlalay, Casile, Dela Paz, Malaban, Poblacion, San Antonio, San Francisco, San Jose, San Vicente, Santo Domingo, Soro-soro, and Tubigan, while the second district will comprise the southern barangays Biñan, Bungahan, Ganado, Langkiwa, Loma, Malamig, Mamplasan, Platero, Santo Niño, Santo Tomas, Timbao, and Zapote. The bill remains pending before the House Committee on Local Government.

== Lone District ==
Legislative districts and representatives of Biñan
| District | Current Representative | Party | Residency | Barangays | Population (2024) | Area |
|---|---|---|---|---|---|---|
| Lone | Walfredo Dimaguila Jr. (since 2025); Malaban | Lakas–CMD | Malaban | List: Biñan; Bungahan; Canlalay; De La Paz; Ganado; Langkiwa; Loma; Malaban; Malamig; Mampalasan; Platero; Poblacion; San Antonio; San Jose; San Vicente; Santo Domingo; Santo Niño; Santo Tomas; Soro-soro; Timbao; Tubigan; Zapote | 584,479 | 43.50 km² |

== See also ==
- Legislative districts of Laguna
