= Ilocano people =

Tattáo nga Ilóko' Kailukoán Kailukanoán
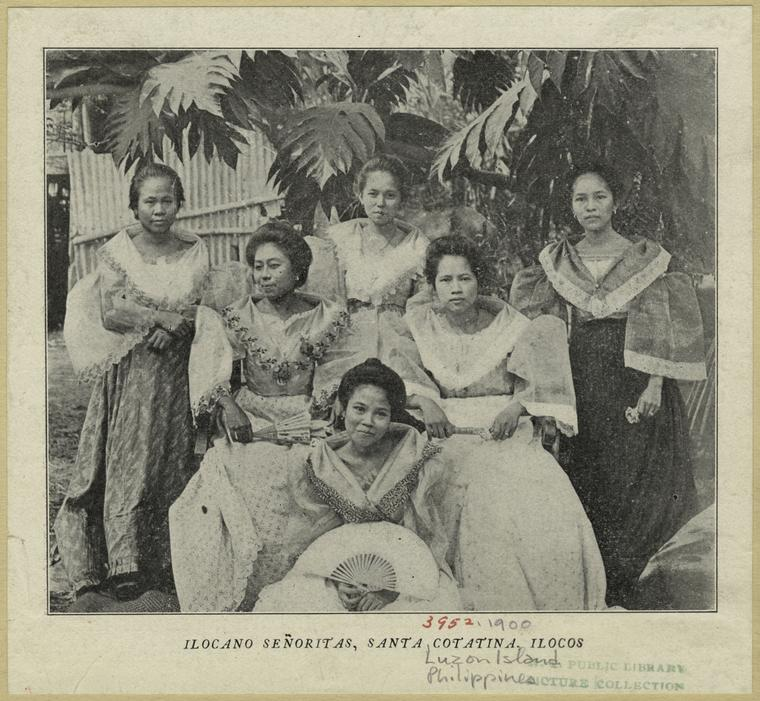
- Ilocano señoritas from Santa Catalina, Ilocos Sur, c. 1900

Total population
- 8,746,169 (2020)

Regions with significant populations
- Philippines (Ilocos Region, Cordillera, Cagayan Valley, Central Luzon, Metro Manila, some parts of Mindanao especially in Soccsksargen and Northern Mindanao) Significant diaspora in: United States (Hawaii, California); Canada; United Kingdom; Australia; New Zealand; Singapore; United Arab Emirates

Languages
- Native; Iloco; Also; Hiligaynon • Cebuano (those who are residents of Soccksargen and Northern Mindanao); Filipino • English

Religion
- Predominantly; Christianity (majority Roman Catholicism • minority Aglipayan and Protestantism)

Related ethnic groups
- Itneg, Pangasinan, Kankanaey, other Cordilleran ethnic groups, and other Austronesian peoples

The Ilocano people (Ilocano: Tattáo nga Ilóko, Kailukoán, Kailukanoán), also referred to as Ilokáno, Ilóko, Ilúko, or Samtóy, are an Austronesian ethnolinguistic group native to the Philippines. Originally from the Ilocos Region on the northwestern coast of Luzon, they have since spread throughout northern and central Luzon, particularly in the Cagayan Valley, the Cordillera Administrative Region, and the northern and western areas of Central Luzon. The Ilocanos constitute the third-largest ethnolinguistic group in the Philippines. Their native language is called Iloco or Iloko.

Beyond the northern Luzon, large Ilocano populations are found in Metro Manila, Mindoro, Palawan, and Mindanao, as well as in the United States, particularly in Hawaii and California, owing to extensive Ilocano migration in the 19th and 20th centuries. Ilocano culture reflects a blend of Roman Catholic influences and pre-colonial animist-polytheistic traditions, shaped by their agricultural lifestyle and strong family-communal ties.

== Etymology ==
Prior to the arrival of the Spaniards, the Ilocanos referred to themselves as "Samtóy," a contraction of "saó mi ditoy," "saó mi ítoy," or "saó mi toy" an Ilocano words that mean "our language here."

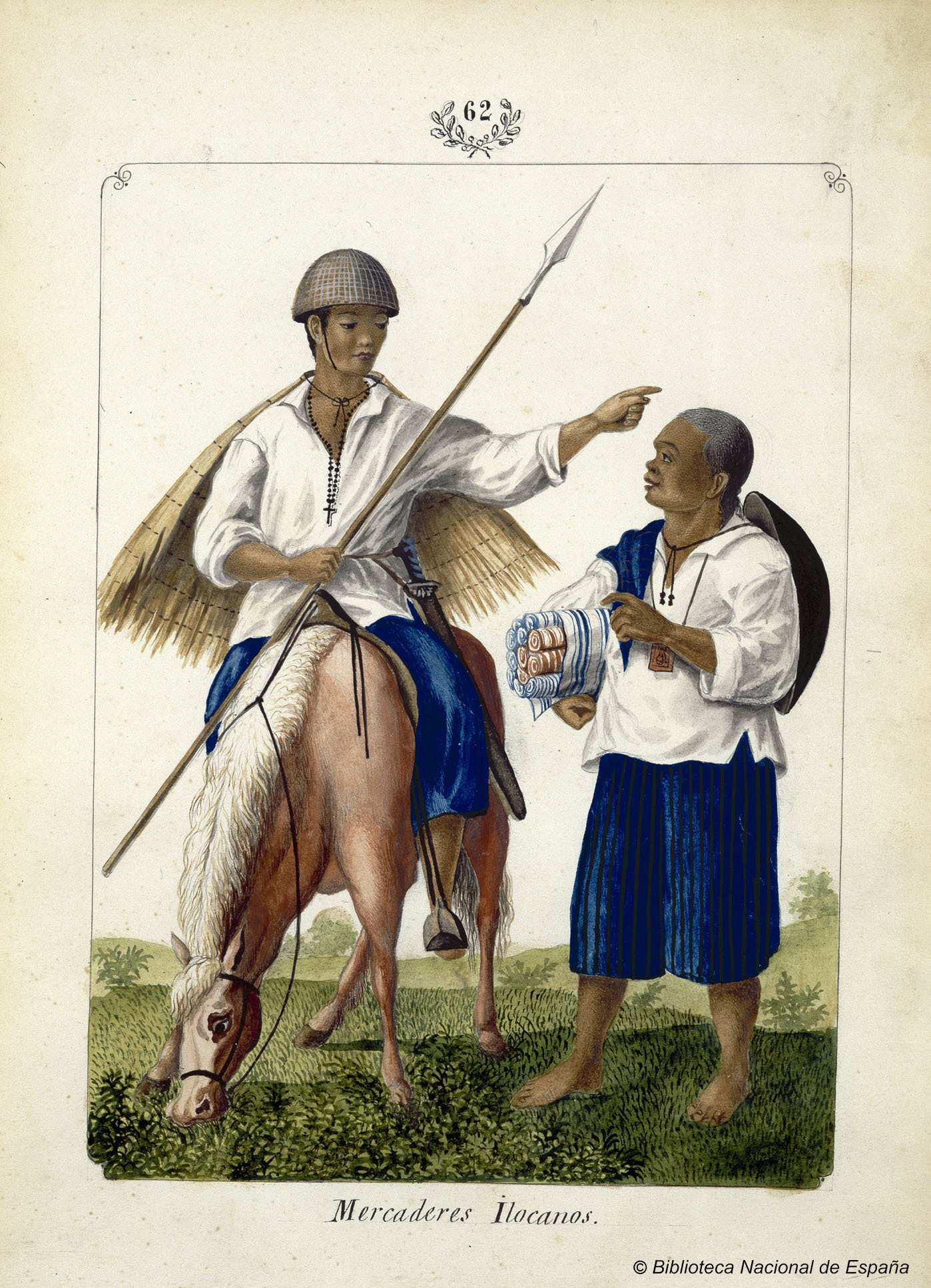
Mercaderes Ilocanos (Ilocano merchants), c. 1847, by José Honorato Lozano. One on horseback with an annangá (palm raincoat), kattukóng & holding a gayáng, the other with a rolled inabél.

The term Ilocáno (also spelled Ilokáno) is the Hispanized plural form of Ilóco or Ilóko, with the archaic Spanish rendering Ylóco, Yloquio, or Ylucos. According to Vocabulario de la lengua Ilocana, it is derived from the combination of the prefix i- meaning of or from, and luék, luëk, or loóc meaning sea or bay in the Iloco language, translating to "from [along] the bay." This reflects the geographical origin of the Ilocano people, whose early settlements were located near coastal regions and bays. Therefore, Ilocano denotes the "people from [along] the bay."

An alternative etymological explanation links the term to lúku or lúkung, which refers to flatlands, valleys, or depressions in the land. This suggests that the term Ilocano originally denoted "people of the lowlands", referring to inhabitants of areas situated between the gúlot or gúlod (mountains) and the luék (sea or bay).

The name Ylocano or Ilocano is the Hispanized version of the native term Ilúko. It follows the grammatical structure of Spanish by appending the suffix -ano to denote a people or group, as seen in terms like Americano, Africano, and Mexicano. This adaptation signifies the race or identity of the Ilocano people according to the colonizer's linguistic conventions. One effect of the Spanish language on the demonym is the introduction of grammatical gender. The masculine forms, Ilocano or Ilokano, refer to males, while the feminine forms, Ilocana or Ilokana, refer to females. However, Ilocano is generally considered gender-neutral and can refer to individuals of any gender.

== History ==
=== Pre-History ===
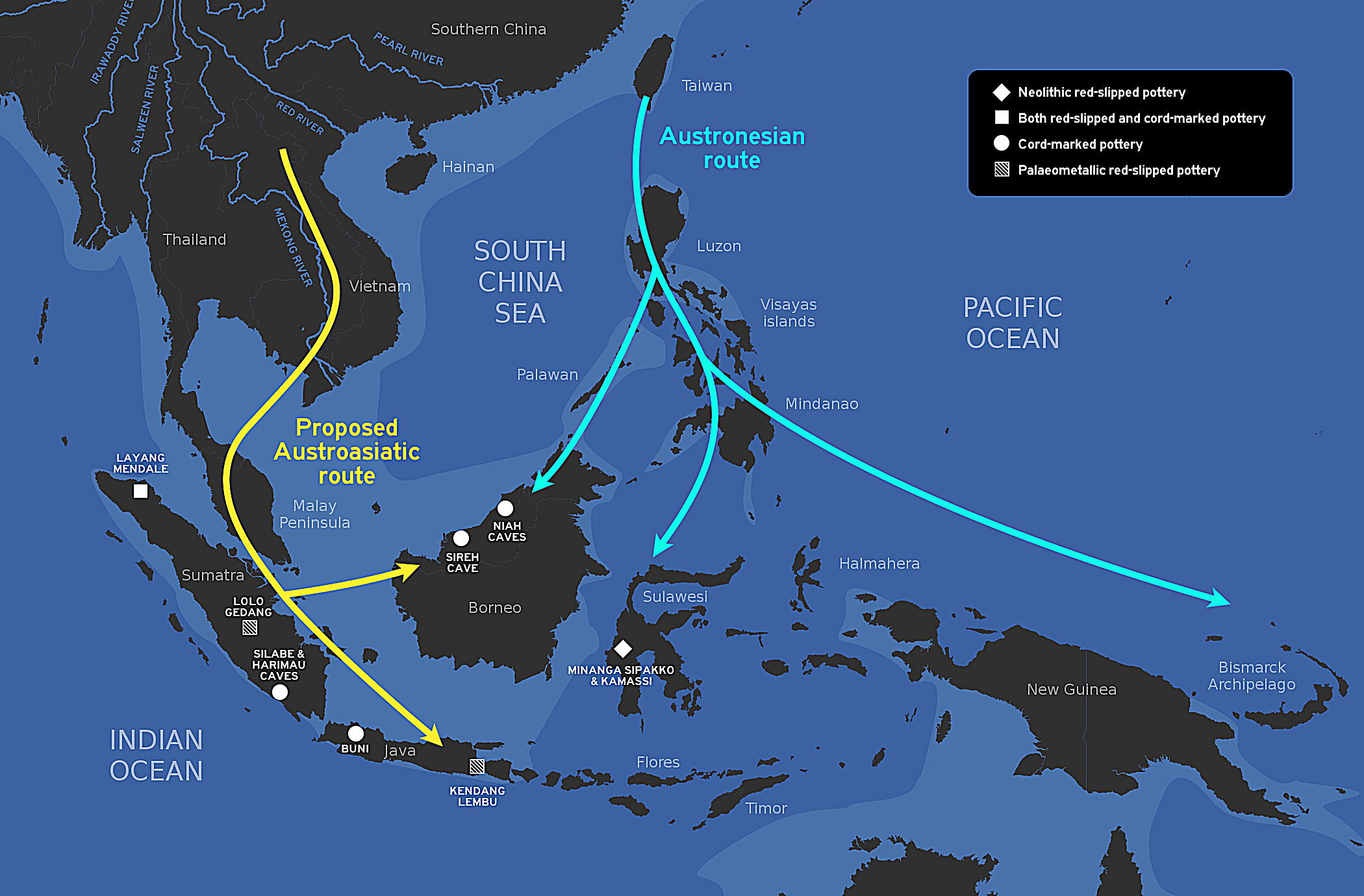
Map Depicting the Austronesian Migration from Taiwan

The Ilocano people are one of the Austronesian peoples of Northern Luzon who migrated southward through the Philippines thousands of years ago using wooden boats known as biray or bilog for trade and cargo. The prevailing theory regarding the dispersal of Austronesian peoples is the "Out of Taiwan" hypothesis, which suggests that Neolithic-era migrations from Taiwan led to the emergence of the ancestors of contemporary Austronesian populations.

A genetic study conducted in 2021 revealed that Austronesians, originating from either Southern China or Taiwan, arrived in the Philippines in at least two distinct waves. The first wave occurred approximately 10,000 to 7,000 years ago, bringing the ancestors of the indigenous groups residing around the Cordillera Central mountain range. Subsequent migrations introduced additional Austronesian groups along with agricultural practices, resulting in the effective replacement of the languages of the existing populations. The second wave brought the Ilocanos, who settled in the northern coastal areas of Luzon.

=== Early history ===
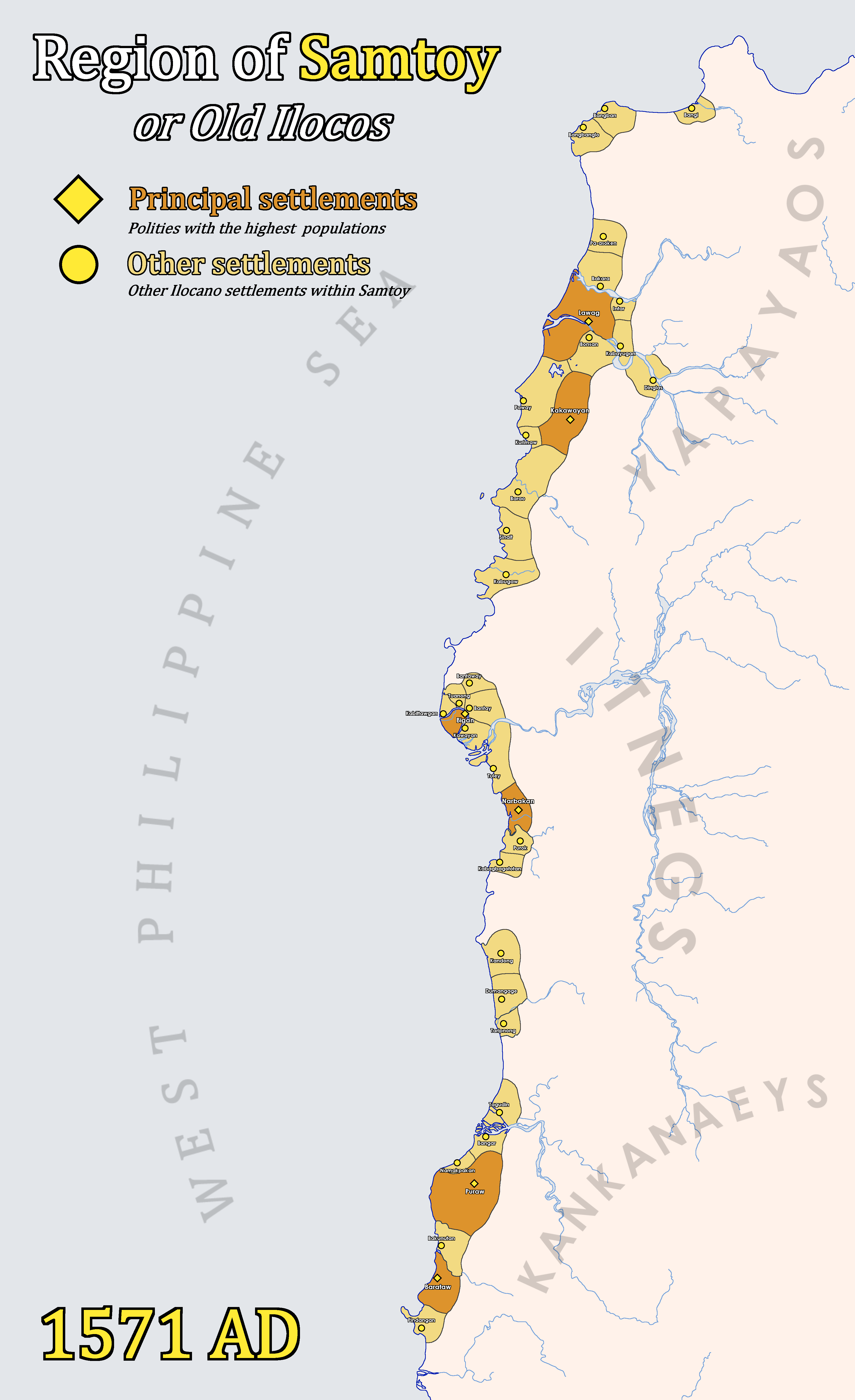
A map of Samtoy or Ilocos in 1571 before the advent of the Spaniards under Juan de Salcedo.

The early history of the Ilocanos is rooted in animistic and polytheistic religious practices, with a belief that anitos (spirits) resided in the natural environment. Key deities in the Ilocano belief system included Buni, the god of the earth; Parsua, the creator; and Apo Langit, the lord of heaven. However, due to the dispersed nature of Ilocano settlements, distinct regional variations of these beliefs developed, each with its own set of deities and spiritual practices. The Ilocano religious tradition was also influenced by neighboring ethnolinguistic groups such as the Cordillerans (Igorot), Tagalogs, and external cultures, particularly the Chinese.

Ilocanos were both agriculturalists and seafarers, engaging in active trade and barter systems with neighboring groups, including the Cordillerans, whose emporium for their gold mines and rice from their terraces in the Cordillera Central, as well as the Pangasinans, Sambals, Tagalogs, Ibanags, and foreign traders from China, Japan, and other Maritime Southeast Asian countries. These interactions were part of a larger maritime trade network that spanned the Indian Ocean and South China Sea. Traded goods included porcelain, rice, silk, cotton, beeswax, gems, beads, and precious minerals, with gold being a significant commodity.

Ilocano settlements were referred to as íli, a term similar to the Tagalog barangay, with smaller groups of houses known as purók. The social structure of Ilocano society was hierarchical, with leadership typically held by an agtúray or ári (chieftain), whose position was often inherited based on strength, wealth, and wisdom. The agtúray was supported by a council of elders in governance. Below the chief were the babaknáng, wealthy individuals who controlled trade and could potentially rise to leadership roles. Beneath them were the kailianes (tenant farmers or katalonan), while at the bottom of the social hierarchy were the ubíng (servants) and tagábu (slaves), who faced significant social and economic disadvantages.

=== Spanish Colonization ===
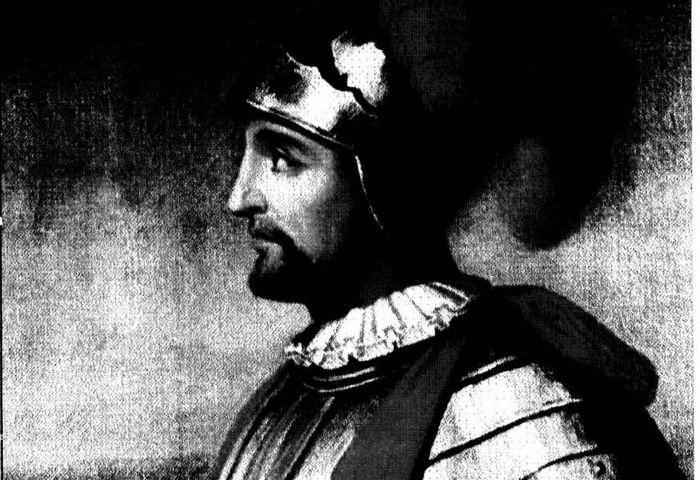
Juan de Salcedo, a 16th-century Spanish conquistador who led the colonization of the Ilocano people in 1572.

In June 1572, the Spanish colonization of northern Luzon commenced under the leadership of conquistador Juan de Salcedo, the grandson of Miguel López de Legazpi. Salcedo, along with an expedition of eight armed boats and 70 to 80 men, ventured northward following the successful pacification of Pangasinan. The expedition encountered a cluster of native settlements collectively known as Samtoy, derived from the Ilocano phrase "sao mi ditoy" (meaning "our language here"). The Spaniards subsequently named the region Ylocos and its inhabitants Ylocanos.

The Ilocanos were primarily coastal and valley settlers living in sheltered coves (luék, luëk, or loóc) along the Ilocos coastline. They engaged in trade and barter with neighboring groups such as the Cordillerans (Igorots) and Pangasinenses, as well as with foreign merchants from China and Japan. Despite their peaceful and self-sufficient way of life, the Ilocanos faced demands for tribute from the Spaniards, who also sought to convert them to Christianity and incorporate them into the Spanish colonial framework. These impositions provoked various forms of Ilocano resistance.

One of the earliest recorded acts of defiance occurred in coastal settlement of Purao (modern-day Balaoan) literally means white in Ilocano due to pristine white beach of the area, where the Ilocanos refused to pay tribute. This rebellion escalated into violence, marking the first instance of bloodshed in the Ilocanos' resistance against Spanish colonization called the Battle of Purao.

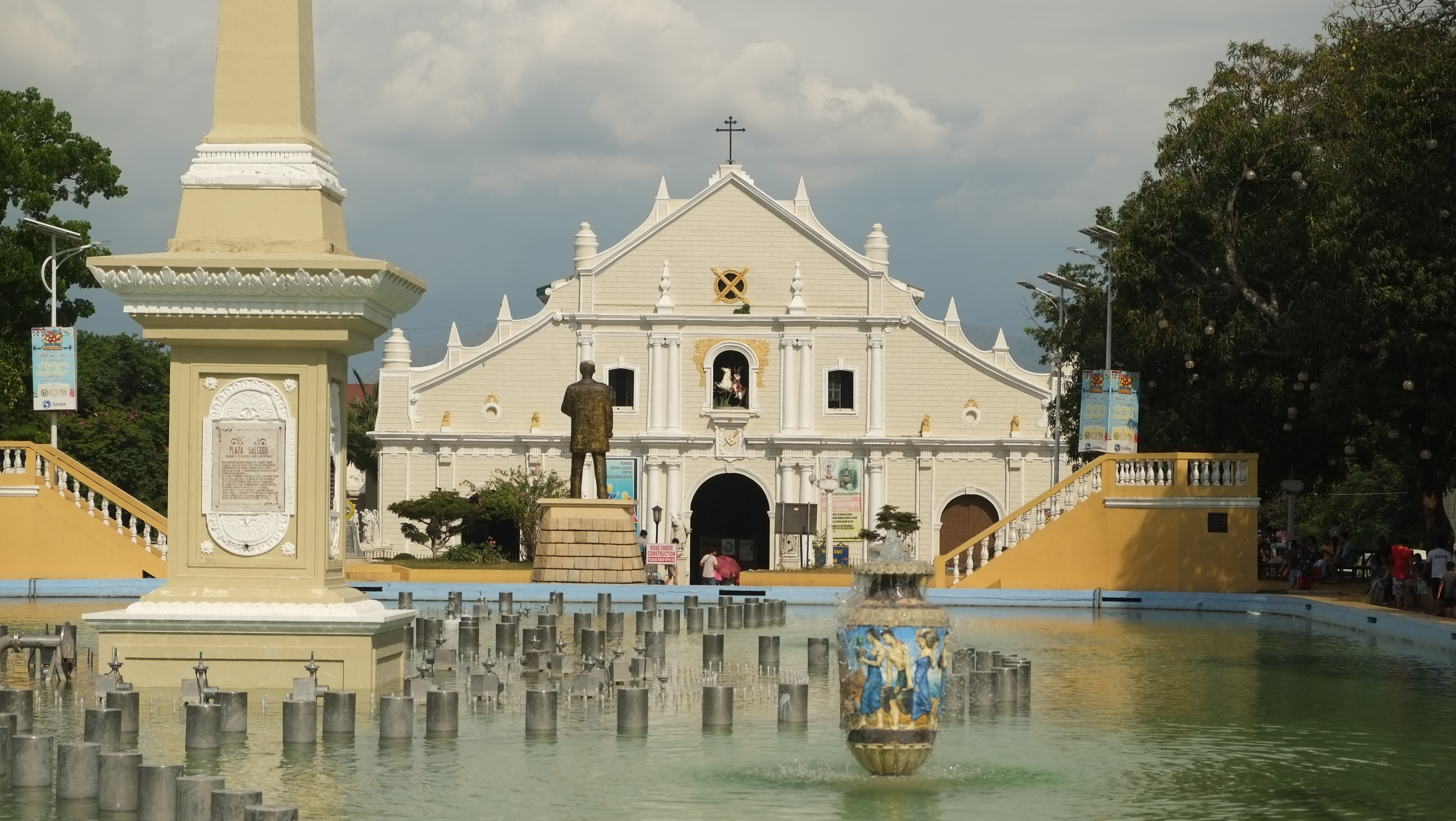
Vigan Cathedral, served as the seat of the Roman Catholic Archdiocese of Nueva Segovia in Northern Luzon during the Spanish colonial period.

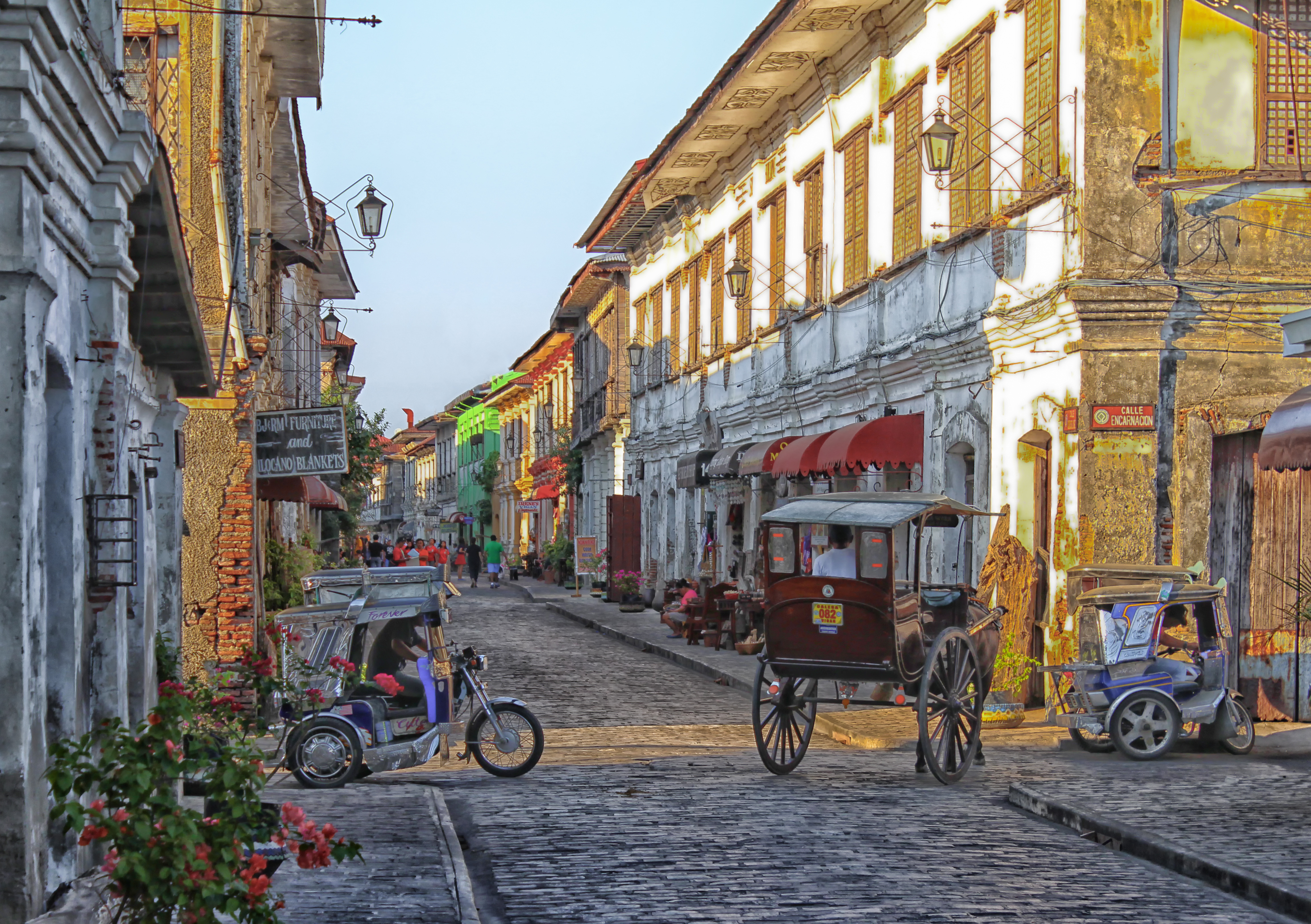
Calle Crisologo in Vigan City, a Spanish colonial-era city.

As Salcedo's forces advanced, they subjugated numerous Ilocano settlements, including Tagurín(now Tagudin), Kaog or Dumangague (now Santa Lucia), Nalbacán (now Narvacan), Kandong (now Candon), Bantay, Sinayt (now Sinait), and Bigan (now Vigan). Among these, Vigan emerged as a vibrant trading hub frequented by Chinese merchants and a focal point of Spanish activity.

Salcedo established Villa Fernandina de Vigan in honor of Prince Ferdinand, the late son of King Philip II. From this administrative center, Salcedo extended his influence to other Ilocano regions, including in the early settlements of Laoag, Currimao, and Badoc, solidifying the foundations of Spanish governance and religion in the area.

By 1574, Salcedo had returned to Vigan, which had become the epicenter of Spanish administration and Christianization efforts in Ilocos. The Augustinian missionaries accompanied the Spanish forces, initiating the systematic evangelization of the Ilocano people. This period saw the establishment of religious, cultural, and administrative institutions that defined Spanish colonial rule in Ilocos.

Fray Andres Carro later wrote in his 1792 manuscript, that when Juan de Salcedo conquered Ilocos in 1572,

...esta provincia de Ylocos, entre dos idiomas y gentes que en ella habia tan diferentes como se vé aun hoy en esa cordillera de montes, era el idioma Samtoy ó más bien Saó mi toy, el mas general.
...this province of Ilocos, between two languages and peoples that were as different as could still be seen in this mountain range the Cordillera Range, it was the Samtoy language Ilocano language, that was the most general.

— Fray Andres Carro

According to Carro, as a result of Spanish interactions, the Spaniards learned the Ilocano language. Through its use and the increased trade and traffic among the natives an activity Carro asserts was absent prior to the Spanish arrival the Ilocano language gained prominence and became widely spoken throughout the province of Ilocos, spanning from Bangui to Agoo.

==== Malong Revolt ====
In 1660, Andres Malong, a leader from Binalatongan (San Carlos), Pangasinan, initiated a rebellion against Spanish colonial rule, declaring himself "King of Pangasinan." Malong allied with Sambal and Negritos forces and sought the support of neighboring provinces of Pampanga, Cagayan and Ilocos, urging them to join his cause against the Spanish. However, the Ilocano leaders, deeply influenced by Spanish missionary and military presence, rejected Malong's demands.

In retaliation, Malong dispatched Don Pedro Gumapos a Zambales chieftain with a 6,000-strong force to invade the Ilocos and Cagayan. The initial Ilocano defense, composed of 1,500 Spanish loyalists under the command of the alcalde mayor and missionaries, was defeated, allowing Gumapos' forces to sack Vigan and neighboring villages. Despite these losses, the Ilocanos organized resistance efforts. Communities in Narvacan and other areas employed guerrilla tactics, often in alliance with the Tinguians, a local indigenous group. These coordinated counterattacks inflicted significant casualties on Gumapos' forces, hindering their advance.

As Gumapos' army retreated south, they burned and looted towns, including Santa Maria, San Esteban, and Candon. However, their campaign ultimately faltered upon reaching Santa Cruz, where Spanish-led forces, bolstered by Ilocano fighters, confronted them after having defeated Malong in Battle of Agoo. Gumapos' army suffered decisive defeats in two major battles, leading to his capture and subsequent execution by hanging in Vigan.

The Ilocano resistance during the war was characterized by their use of guerrilla tactics, strategic alliances, and unwavering defense of their communities. Their contributions significantly weakened Gumapos' forces and played a critical role in suppressing the rebellion. The Ilocos Region's ability to repel the invasion underscored its importance in the Spanish colonial structure and marked a turning point in the conflict.

==== Almazan Revolt ====
In 1661 a significant uprising of Ilocanos led by Don Pedro Almazan of San Nicolas and Laoag, Ilocos Norte. Inspired by the earlier Malong Revolt in Pangasinan, the rebellion sought to overthrow Spanish rule and restore Ilocano self-governance. Declaring himself "King of Ilocos," Almazan used the stolen Crown of Mary from the Laoag Cathedral as a symbol of his authority, rallying widespread support from Ilocano leaders and communities.

Key figures such as Don Juan Magsanop of Bangui and Don Gaspar Cristobal, the gobernadorcillo of Laoag, aligned with Almazan, forming a coalition known as the "trinity" of Ilocano leadership. Ilocano solidarity was further demonstrated through Almazan's establishment of a symbolic monarchy, including the marriage of his son to Cristobal's daughter, which became a unifying symbol for the people.

Among their grievances include abuses done by government officials and friars being sent to the Philippines, which regardless of their backgrounds took higher positions than locals could ever hope to achieve. Almazan pledged to make as many shackles as there were Spanish in Ilocos when opportunity permits.

On January 31, 1661, Magsanop declared independence in Bacarra and called on the Calanasanes of Apayao to join the cause. The rebels, consisting largely of Ilocano farmers, craftsmen, and local leaders, showcased their unity and resourcefulness by organizing forces, burning the church in Laoag, and advancing through Cabicungan and Pata into Cagayan. Despite their efforts, the rebels lacked reinforcements from other uprisings and faced logistical challenges.

By February 1661, Spanish forces with 300 soldiers under Alférez Lorenzo Arqueros and Maestre de Campo Juan Manalo launched a counteroffensive. The Ilocano rebels employed guerrilla tactics and utilized their knowledge of the region's terrain to resist Spanish advances, forcing prolonged skirmishes in the mountainous areas. Despite their resilience and strategic efforts, the rebels were eventually overwhelmed. Juan Magsanop was captured but chose suicide over imprisonment, while Don Pedro Almazan and sixteen other leaders were captured and executed in Vigan.

==== Silang Revolt ====
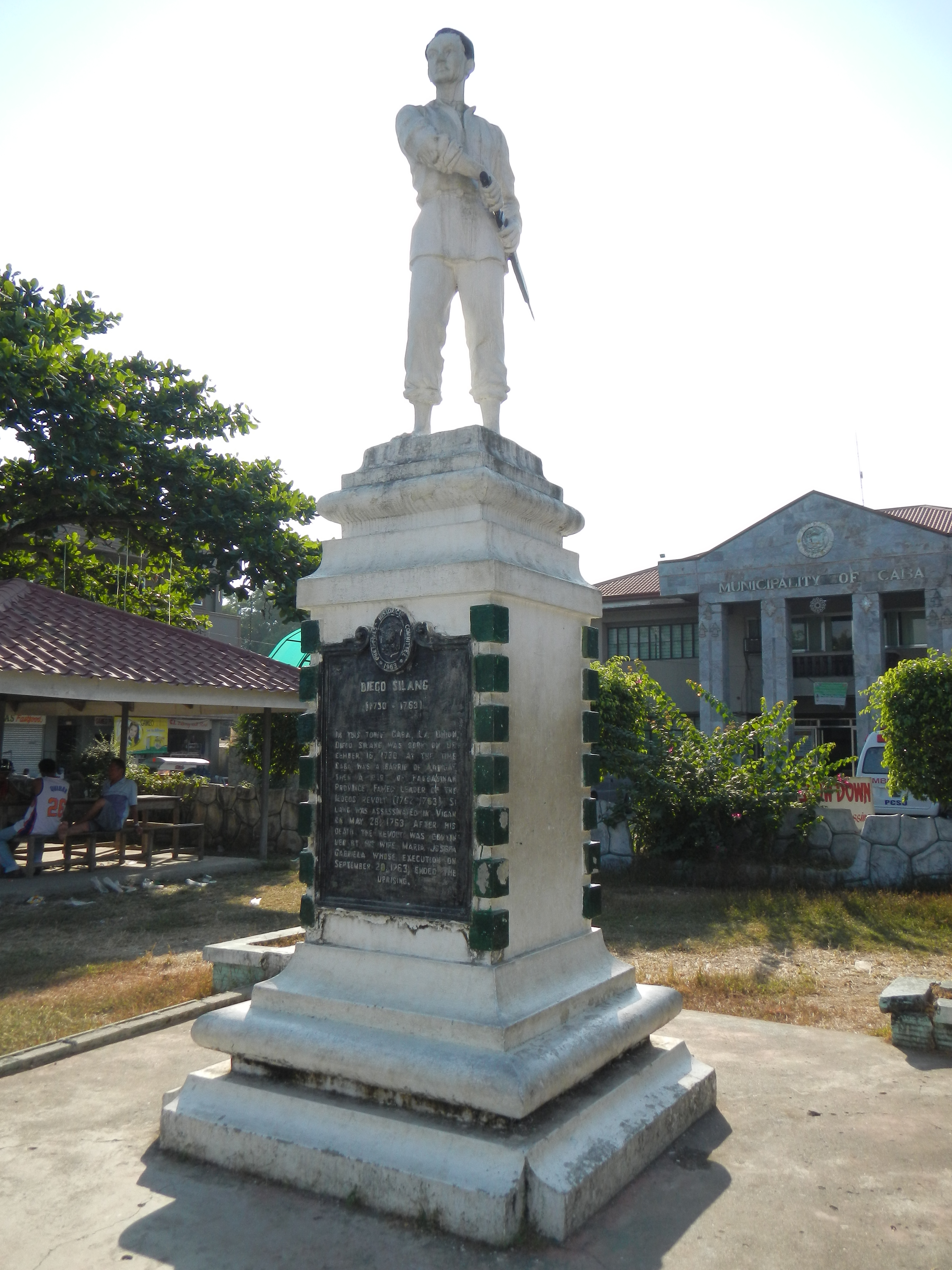
Diego Silang statue in his birthplace, Caba, La Union

The first significant uprising against Spanish colonial rule in the Philippines, spearheaded by Diego Silang and, after his death, by his wife, Gabriela Silang. This revolt took place amidst the broader context of the Seven Years' War, during which Britain, retaliating against Spain's alliance with France, launched a military incursion into the Philippines. In September 1762, British forces occupied Manila, and their military operations aimed to seize control of other Philippine provinces. The weakening of Spanish power presented an opportunity for Diego Silang to lead a rebellion in Ilocos.

Diego Silang's motivations were deeply rooted in the hardships experienced by the Ilocanos under Spanish rule. The Ilocanos faced heavy taxation, forced labor for the construction of churches and government buildings, and the imposition of monopolies by the Spanish. These widespread grievances contributed to a strong local support base for the revolt. Silang's disillusionment began when, while serving as a courier for the parish priest in Vigan, he witnessed the injustices faced by the people of Ilocos and the rest of the Philippines. After unsuccessful negotiations with Spanish authorities for more autonomy for the Ilocanos, he resolved to take up arms in revolt.

By December 1762, Diego Silang had successfully seized Vigan and declared the independence of Ilocandia, naming it "Free Ilocos" with Vigan as its capital. He was promised military support from the British, but this assistance never materialized, leaving him vulnerable. Despite this setback, Silang pressed on with the rebellion, determined to liberate Ilocos from Spanish control. The rebellion, however, was cut short when Diego Silang was assassinated in May 1763 by Miguel Vicos, a mestizo of Spanish and Ilocano descent, who had once been his ally. The assassination was orchestrated by Spanish authorities, both governmental and ecclesiastical, in an effort to eliminate Silang's challenge to their rule. Although Diego Silang's death marked a temporary setback for the revolt, his cause was carried forward by his wife, Gabriela Silang.

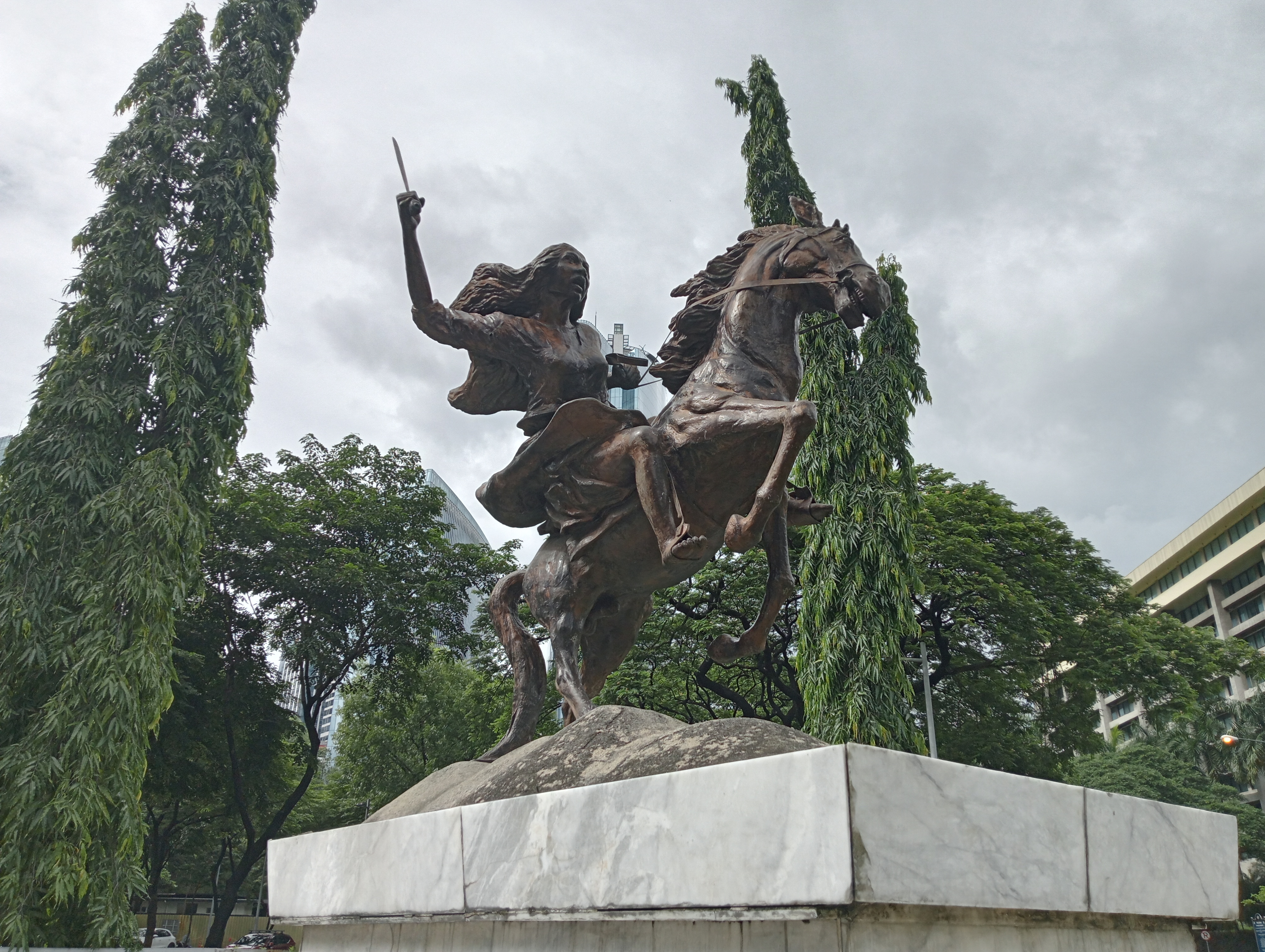
Gabriela Silang Monument, Ayala Triangle, Makati City

Gabriela Silang assumed leadership of the insurgents and continued to resist Spanish rule. Under her command, the Ilocano forces achieved their first victory in the town of Santa, where they defeated Spanish troops. This success startled the Spanish, who had not anticipated a woman leading a revolt. After the victory, Gabriela and her forces retreated to the rugged terrain of Pidigan, Abra, where they were joined by Diego Silang's uncle, Nicolas Cariño. Cariño temporarily assumed command and gathered around 2,000 men loyal to Diego Silang.

On September 10, 1763, Gabriela and her forces launched attacks on the Spanish in Vigan. While some skirmishes resulted in victories, others were defeats, and both sides suffered heavy casualties. Ultimately, Gabriela's forces were overwhelmed, and she was captured by Spanish forces led by Miguel Vicos, who had previously assassinated her husband. Gabriela was paraded through coastal towns as a public spectacle to instill fear among the Ilocanos. She was publicly hanged in September 1763, along with nearly ninety of her supporters, marking the end of the Silang Revolt. Despite her death, Gabriela Silang's legacy endured. She is often referred to as the "Joan of Arc of the Philippines" and is remembered as the first female leader in the country's history to actively fight for its liberation from colonial rule.

==== Basi Revolt ====
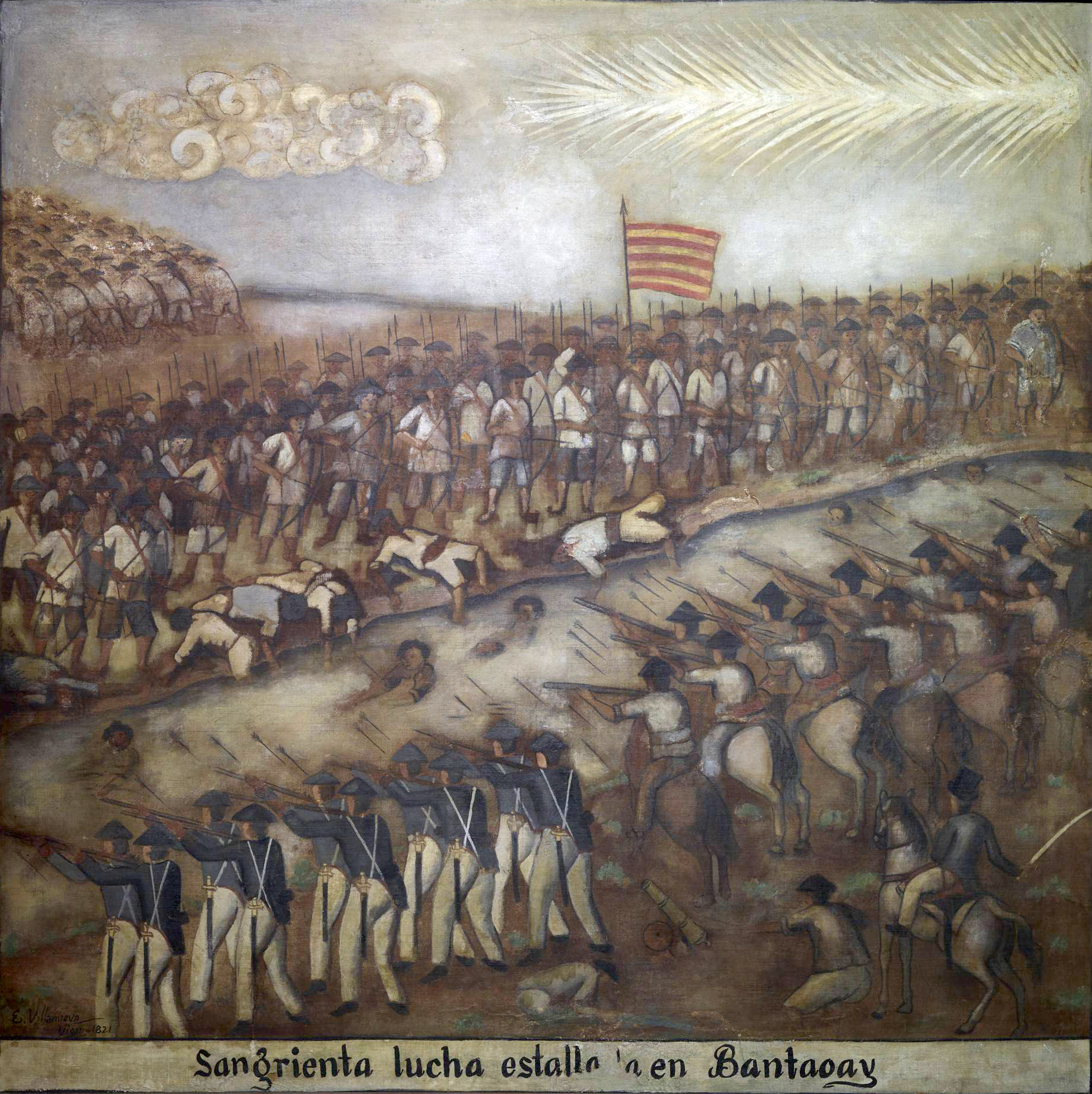
A bloody war between the Ilocanos and the local Spanish army breaks out in Bantaoay

In the late 18th century, discontent among the populace grew due to a monopoly on local basi wine, a sugarcane-based alcoholic beverage, enforced by the Spanish colonial government. This monopoly regulated the consumption of basi and mandated that producers sell it at a low price. Basi held significant cultural and societal importance for the Ilocanos, being integral to rituals surrounding childbirth, marriage, and death. Production of basi was also a vital industry in Ilocos, making the Spanish-imposed monopoly a substantial cultural and economic detriment.

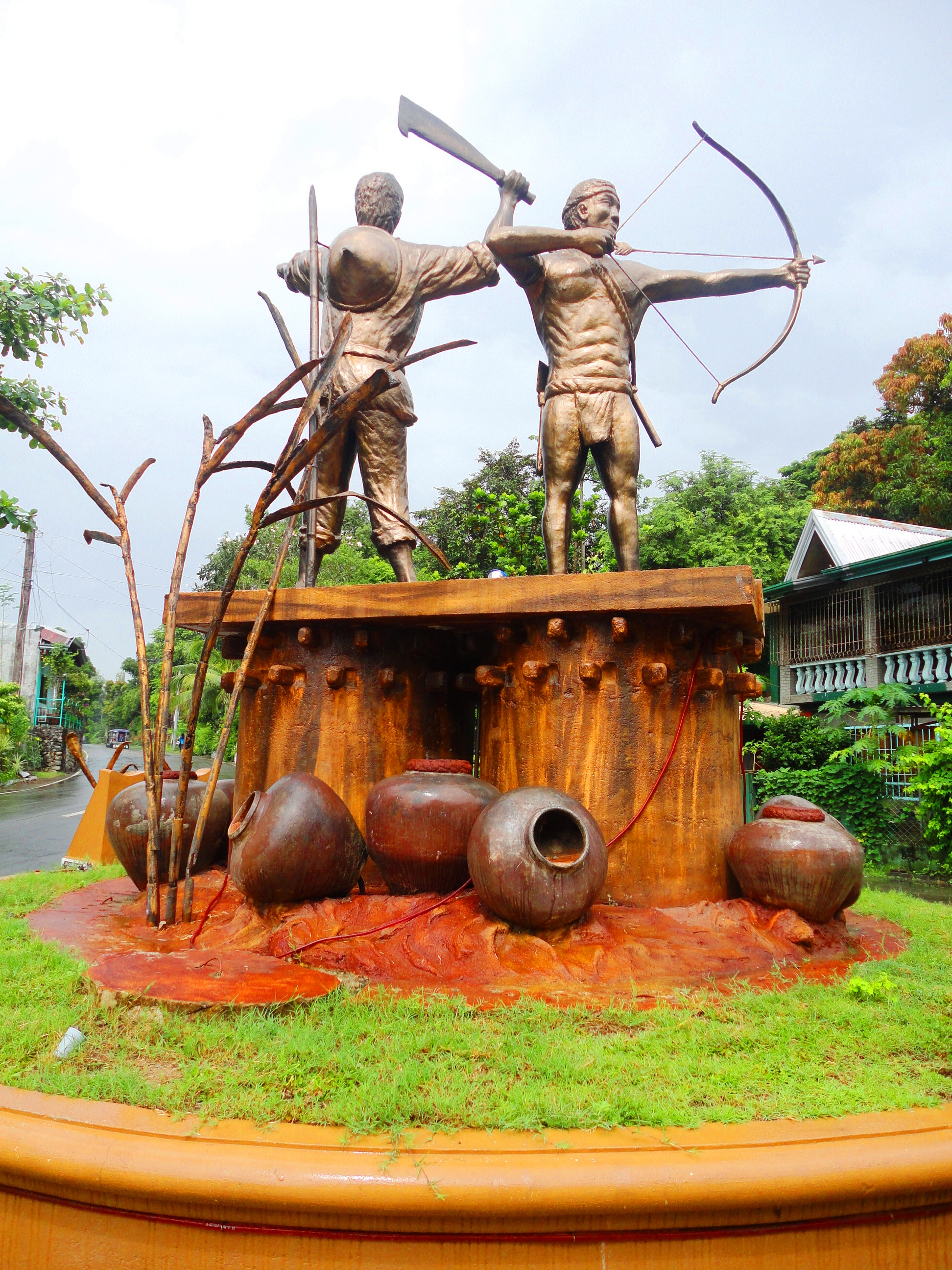
Monument to the Basi Revolt, Piddig, Ilocos Norte

Anger at the enforced monopoly culminated in the Basi Revolt, also known as the Ambaristo Revolt, which occurred on September 16, 1807, in present-day Piddig, and subsequently spread throughout the province. The revolt was led by Pedro Mateo, a cabeza de barangay from Piddig, and Saralogo Ambaristo. Participants included people from various towns of Ilocos Norte and Ilocos Sur, including Piddig, Badoc, Sarrat, Laoag, Sinait, Cabugao, Magsingal, and others. They marched toward the provincial capital of Vigan.

In response to the revolt, the alcalde-mayor, Juan Ybañez, mobilized the town mayors and the Vigan troops to confront the rebels. On September 28, while crossing the Bantaoay River in San Ildefonso en route to Vigan, the Ilocano forces were ambushed by Spanish troops, resulting in the deaths of hundreds. Survivors faced execution, and their leaders were publicly rounded up and executed.

The Basi Revolt flag

The revolt prompted the colonial government to partition the Ilocos province into Ilocos Norte and Ilocos Sur.

=== Philippine Revolution ===
The Ilocano revolutionaries made significant contributions to the Philippine Revolution, employing Ilocano fighting techniques and weapon styles, particularly through their leadership and military efforts under General Manuel Tinio, a central figure in the northern resistance against Spanish forces. His brigade garrisoned the entire western portion of Northern Luzon, which included Pangasinan and the four main Ilocano provinces: Ilocos Norte, Ilocos Sur, Abra, and La Union, as well as the comandancias of Amburayan, Lepanto-Bontoc, and Benguet. To manage this vast territory effectively, General Tinio divided it into three military zones:

- Zone 1, under Lt. Col. Casimiro Tinio, covered La Union, Benguet, and Amburayan.
- Zone 2, led by Lt. Col. Blas Villamor, encompassed Southern Ilocos Sur (from Tagudin to Bantay), Abra, and Lepanto-Bontoc.
- Zone 3, commanded by Lt. Col. Irineo de Guzman, included Northern Ilocos Sur (from Sto. Domingo to Sinait) and Ilocos Norte.

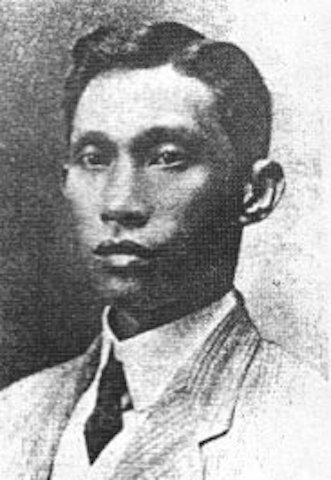
Gen. Manuel Tinio y Bundoc

The Villamor brothers, Blas and Juan, played crucial roles in leading the Ilocano resistance, particularly in Abra, where their guerrilla warfare tactics against Spanish forces were vital in securing key areas. Estanislao Reyes of Vigan, Ilocos Sur, was another significant leader who helped organize and defend against Spanish control in the region. Tinio and his generals resorted to guerrilla warfare to outmaneuver Spanish troops, utilizing the challenging terrain of northern Luzon to their advantage. The military campaigns were highly effective, especially in the Ilocos Sur area, where Blas Villamor defended towns such as Tagudin and Bantay. Juan Villamor focused on strategic operations in Abra, helping to weaken Spanish influence in the region.

In August 1898, the Ilocanos drove the Spanish forces out of several towns, including Laoag, Ilocos Norte, a significant victory that marked a turning point in the revolution. This enabled the revolutionaries to continue their push south and establish provisional governments aligned with Emilio Aguinaldo's revolutionary government.

Meanwhile, Father Gregorio Aglipay, the military vicar general of the Philippine Revolutionary Army, led a separate campaign in Ilocos Norte. Father Aglipay, who would later found the Philippine Independent Church, played a key role in rallying local support and organizing military operations in the region. His leadership was not only religious but also military, as he led several attacks on Spanish forces, contributing to the weakening of Spanish control in Ilocos Norte.

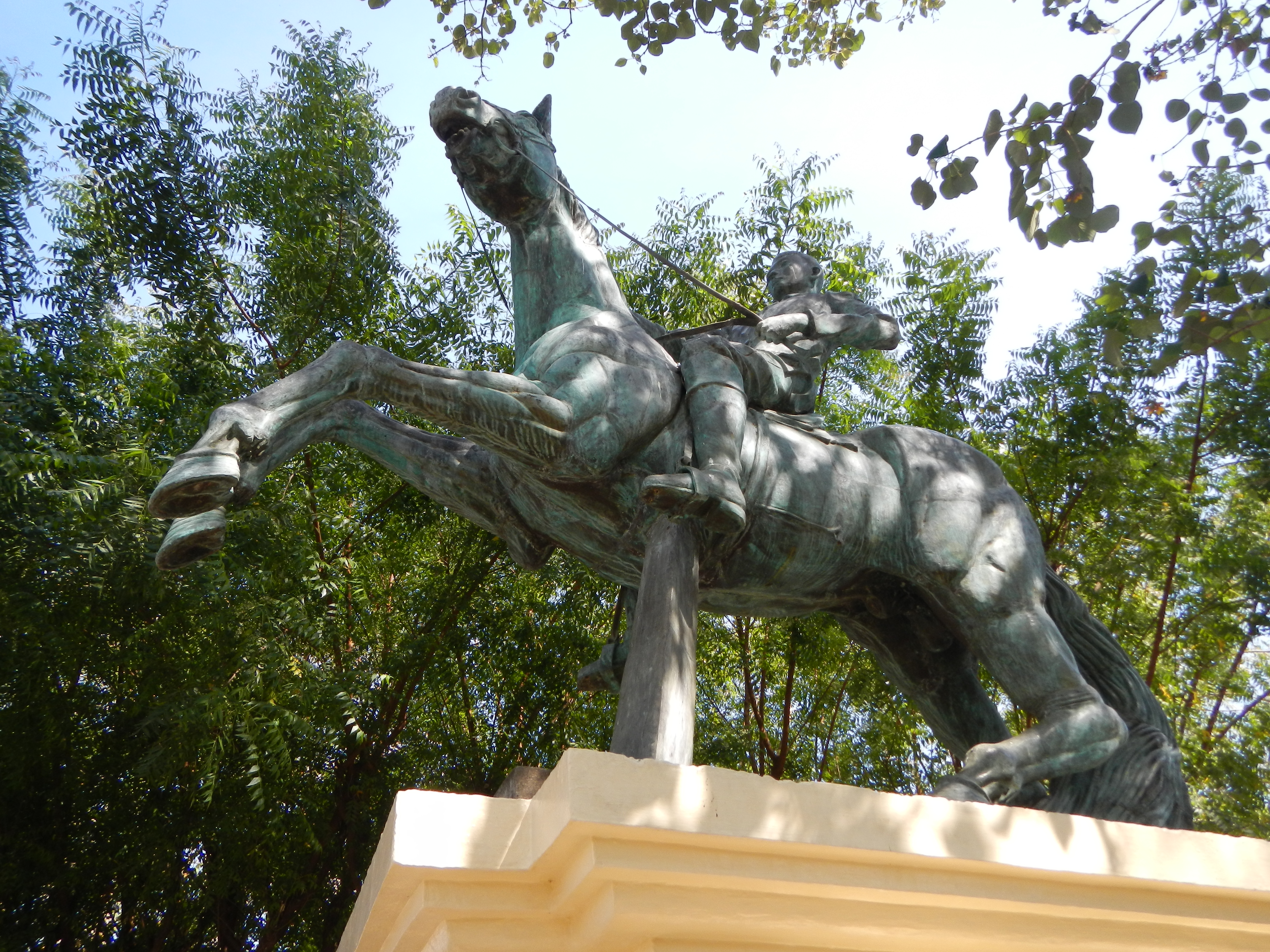
Don Isabelo Abaya, called by Ilocano freedom fighters as the last katipunero

The Cry of Candon is recognized as one of the earliest uprisings that occurred during the second phase of the Philippine Revolution. On March 25, 1898, a force of Ilocano Katipuneros, led by Don Isabelo Abaya, launched an assault on the town of Candon and successfully captured the convent and the center of town from Spanish forces.

The Battle of Vigan, fought in August 1898, stands as one of the most important Ilocano-led victories. Under Estanislao Reyes, the Ilocano fighters successfully defended the town of Vigan, Ilocos Sur, against the Spanish. This battle was crucial in demonstrating the Ilocano people's determination to resist foreign control.

In 1899, as the Philippine-American War intensified, the Ilocano revolutionaries, led by Tinio and his generals, continued to rely on guerrilla tactics to resist American forces. The Ilocanos, familiar with the mountainous terrain, conducted surprise attacks and ambushes, making it difficult for American forces to maintain control over the region.

By 1901, the region eventually fell under American control after prolonged resistance. However, the Ilocano revolutionaries, under the leadership of General Tinio, the Villamor brothers, and Estanislao Reyes, delayed American forces for months, buying valuable time for the rest of the nation's revolutionary efforts. Ilocano resistance ended in April 1901.

=== Philippine-American War ===
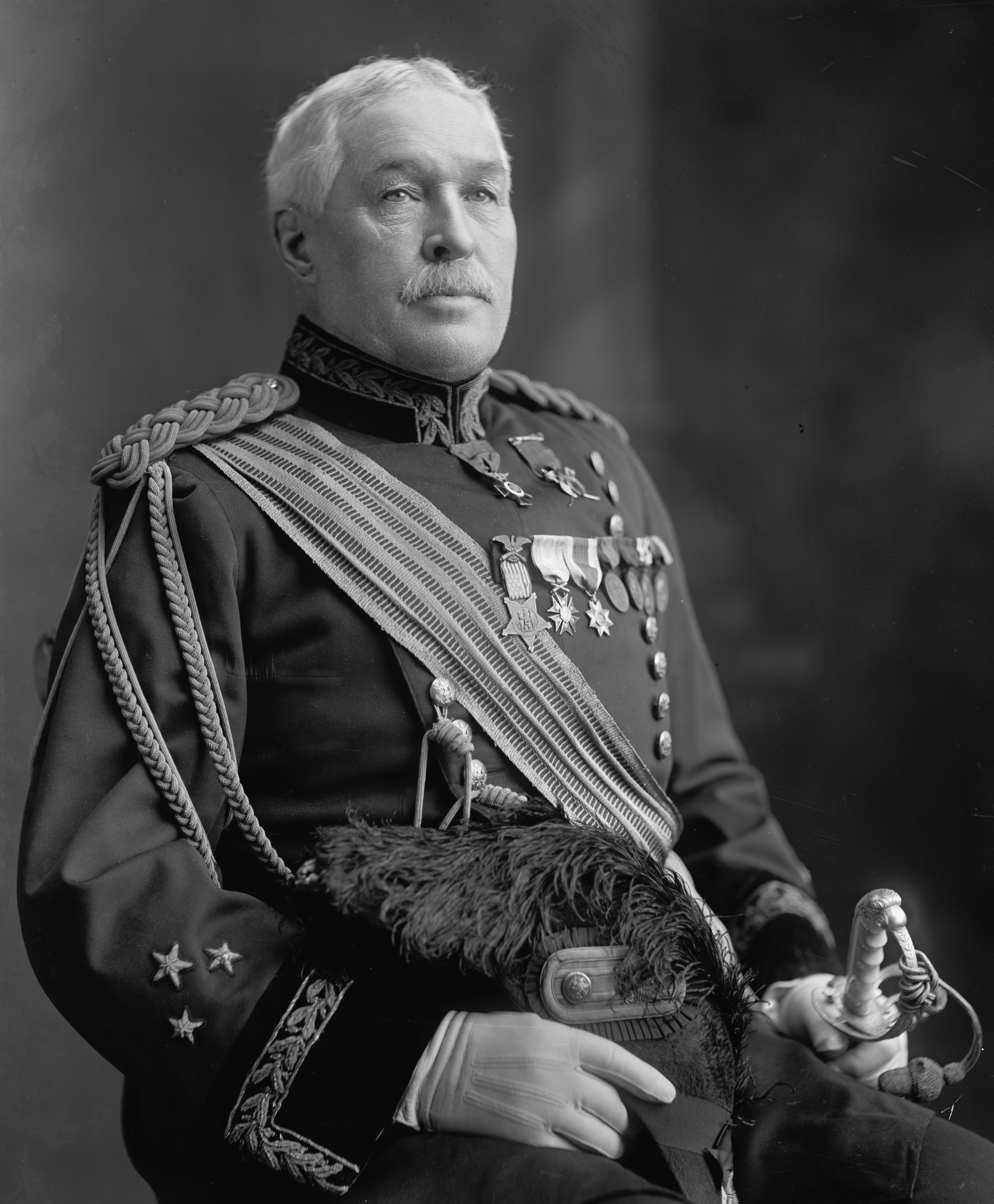
Gen. Samuel B.M. Young, Commanded Brigades in the Northern Luzon District.

The Ilocano resistance during the Philippine-American War (1899–1901) was a period marked by intense conflict and defiance against American occupation in Northern Luzon. The war with the Ilocanos commenced in late November 1899, when General Samuel Baldwin Marks Young led an American offensive through La Union and Ilocos Sur, pushing back the forces of General Manuel Tinio. In response, Ilocano revolutionaries engaged in a combination of guerrilla warfare and conventional battles.

In November 1899, Young's forces captured key Ilocano towns, including San Fernando, Agoo, Balaoan, and Bangar, forcing Tinio's troops to retreat northward. Significant battles occurred in major towns such as Vigan, Laoag, Candon, Bangued, and Santa Maria, where Ilocano forces launched daring attacks on American garrisons.

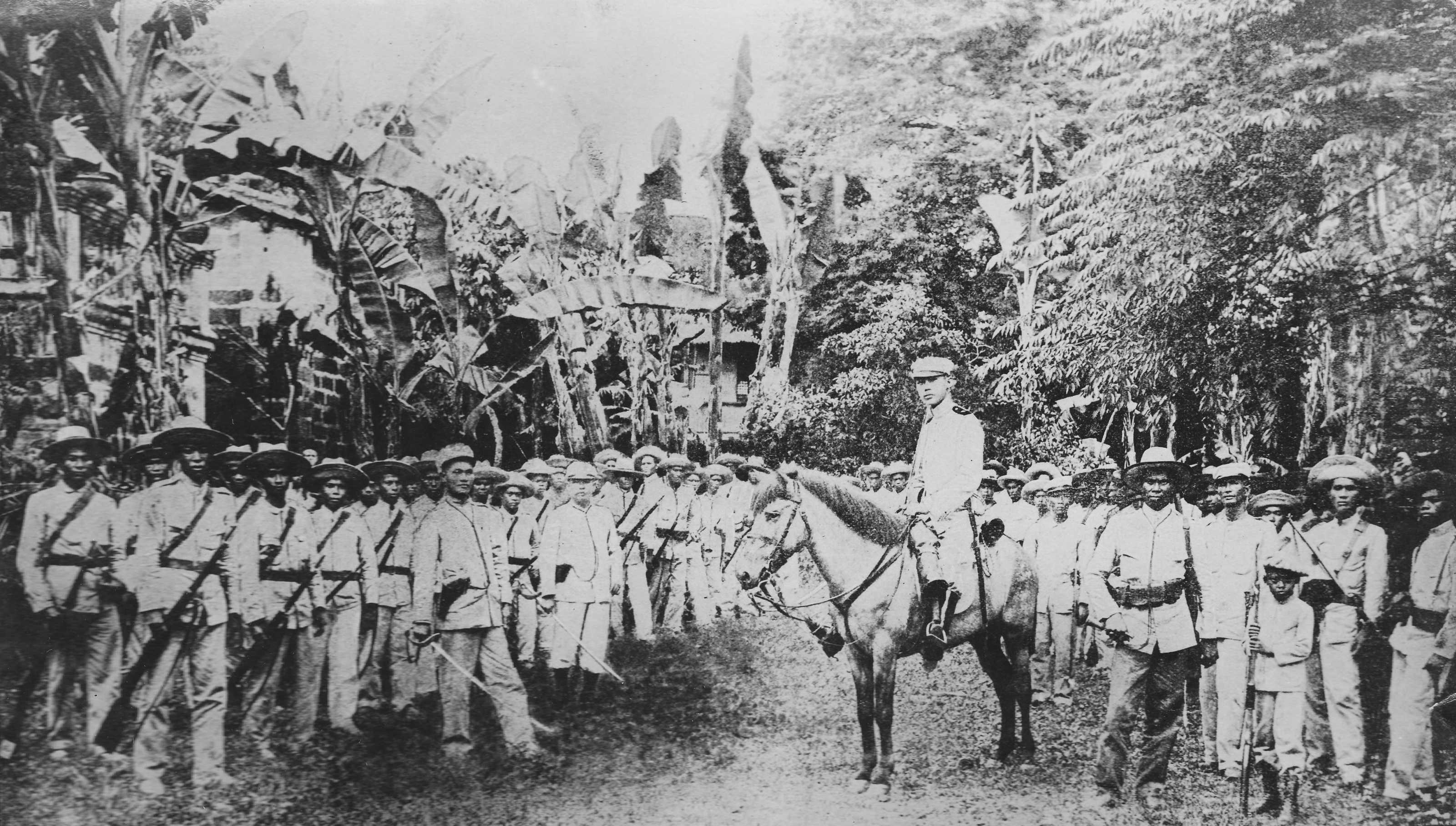
Gen. Gregorio del Pilar and his Troops, circa 1898

On December 2, 1899, the Battle of Tirad Pass became a defining moment in the resistance, as General Gregorio del Pilar and his men fought to delay American forces pursuing President Emilio Aguinaldo.

Throughout 1900, Ilocano forces maintained strong resistance, engaging in battles and skirmishes in Narvacan, Batac, Piddig, San Nicolas, Sinait, and Santa Cruz. Guerrilla fighters disrupted American supply lines and launched ambushes in Tangadan Pass, Bangui, Badoc, and Pasuquin, targeting American patrols and military convoys. Prominent figures such as Colonels Joaquin Luna, Blas and Juan Villamor, Major Estanislao Reyes, Gregorio Aglipay and La Union governor Lucino Almieda and Ilocos Norte governor Ireneo Javier played pivotal roles in the conflict.

In January 1900, coordinated attacks in Namacpacan (now Luna), Santo Domingo, Lapog (now San Juan), and Cabugao included cutting telegraph lines and raiding American garrisons. Major confrontations also occurred in Piddig, Laoag, and Candon, where Filipino forces continued to resist despite increasing American military pressure.

Ilocano civilians were instrumental in sustaining the resistance by providing food, intelligence, and logistical support. Towns and villages served as supply points for guerrilla fighters, despite the threat of American retaliation. The region's harsh terrain, including mountains and forests, was effectively utilized to evade American pursuit and launch surprise attacks.

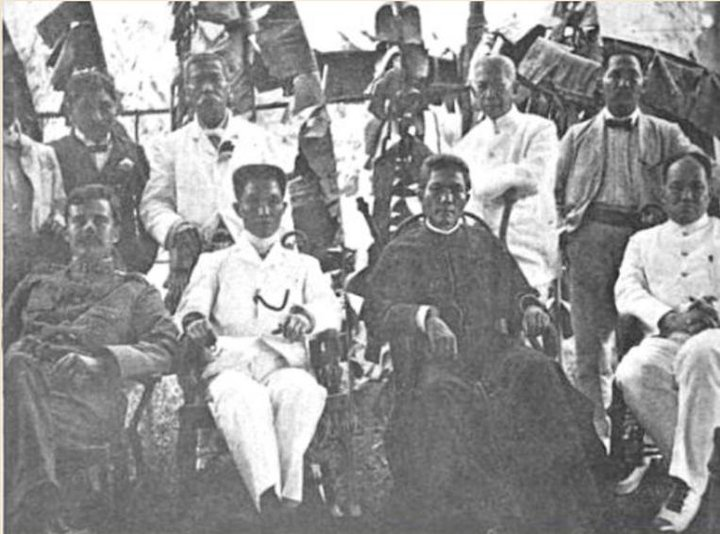
Gregorio Aglipay and Emilio Aguinaldo, prominent figures in the Ilocano Resistance

Religious leaders, particularly Gregorio Aglipay, supported the revolution by rallying local communities and maintaining morale among the fighters. Women, such as Eleuteria Florentino and Salome Reyes, were arrested and deported for their support of the resistance, illustrating widespread civilian involvement.

The American response to the Ilocano resistance was severe, involving brutal counterinsurgency measures such as village burnings, mass arrests, and the forced relocation of civilians to garrisoned town centers. General Samuel Young, a key figure in the American pacification campaign, led numerous operations against Ilocano strongholds and implemented harsh policies to suppress the resistance.

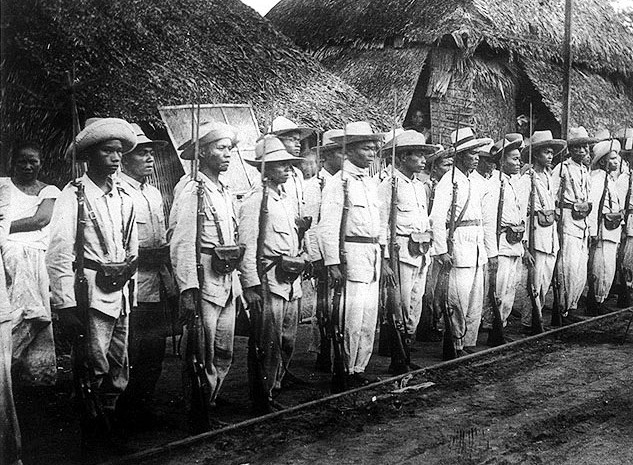
Filipino revolutionary soldiers c. 1899

Later, General J. Franklin Bell adopted a strategy of concentrating civilians in town centers to cut off resources to the guerrillas. American forces also enlisted Igorot tribesmen, who captured Filipino fighters in exchange for rewards. Despite these aggressive tactics, Ilocano forces continued to resist, engaging in battles such as the skirmishes in Parparia and Mount Simminublan, where they inflicted significant casualties on American troops.

By 1901, the resistance began to wane as American counterinsurgency efforts intensified. The capture or surrender of key leaders, including Colonel Blas Villamor, Major Estanislao Reyes, and Colonel Joaquin Alejandrino, weakened the movement's operational capacity.

On April 29, 1901, General Tinio formally surrendered in Vigan, followed by the surrender of his remaining 350 men in May 1901, effectively marking the end of the Ilocano resistance. Despite their eventual defeat, the tactical ingenuity and resilience of the Ilocano revolutionaries played a crucial role in the broader struggle for Philippine independence, leaving a lasting legacy of defiance against colonial rule.

=== American Colonization ===
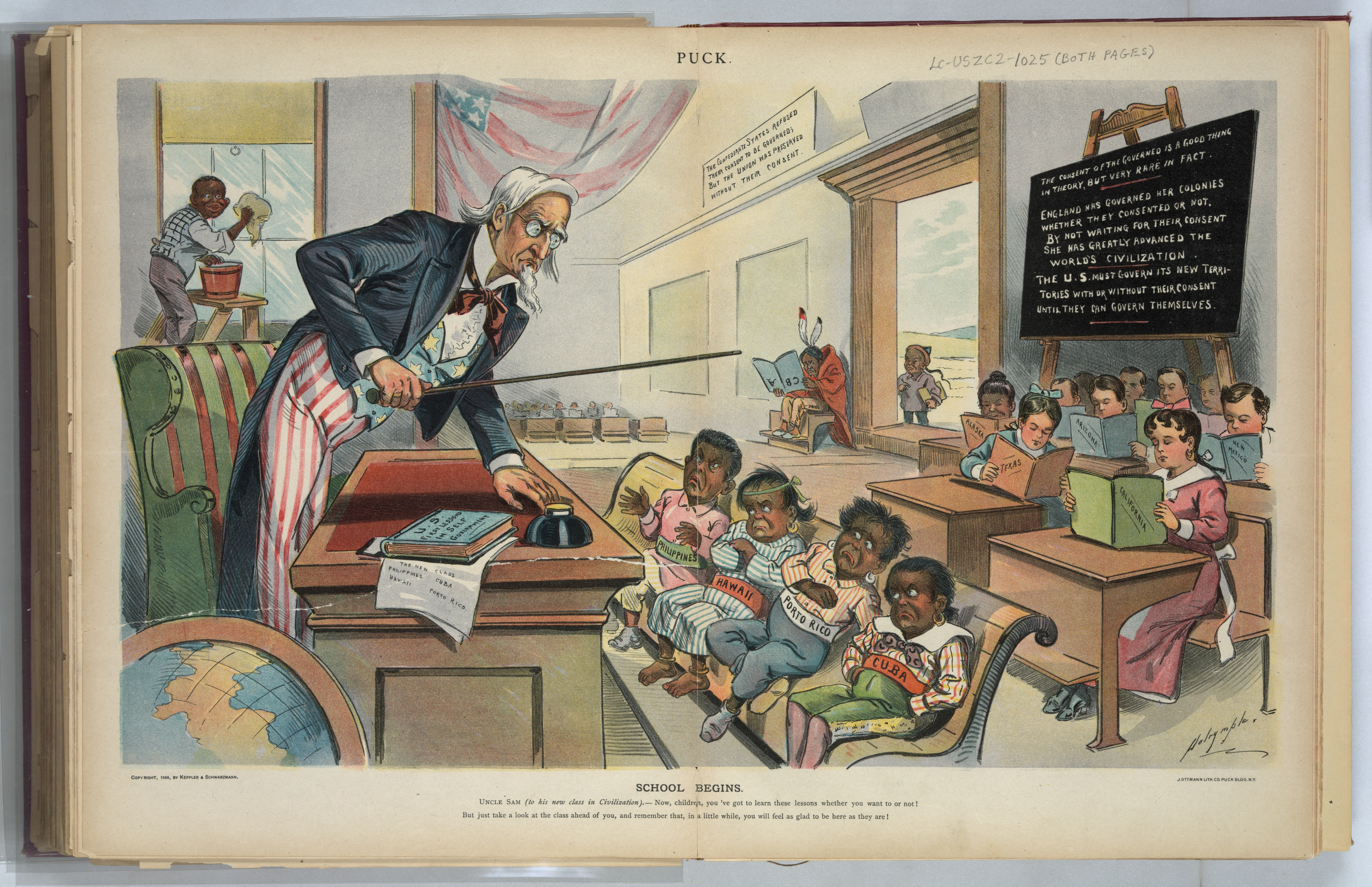
"School Begins," a portrait depicting the imposition of American imperial education in its territories.

By 1901, the US had fully established control over Ilocandia, implementing a military government to suppress local resistance and manage growing insurgencies among the Ilocano population. This military rule was eventually replaced by a civil government, marking a significant shift in the region's governance. Under the civil administration, Ilocano society began to transition into a more organized and democratic structure, influenced by American political and social models.

Key priorities included the expansion of education, suffrage, civil rights, and political participation, which empowered the Ilocano people to actively engage in the democratic processes introduced by the Americans. However, tensions persisted as U.S. military officials, including Colonel William Duvall, resisted relinquishing their control, resulting in frequent conflicts with the Philippine Commission, led by Civil Governor William Howard Taft.

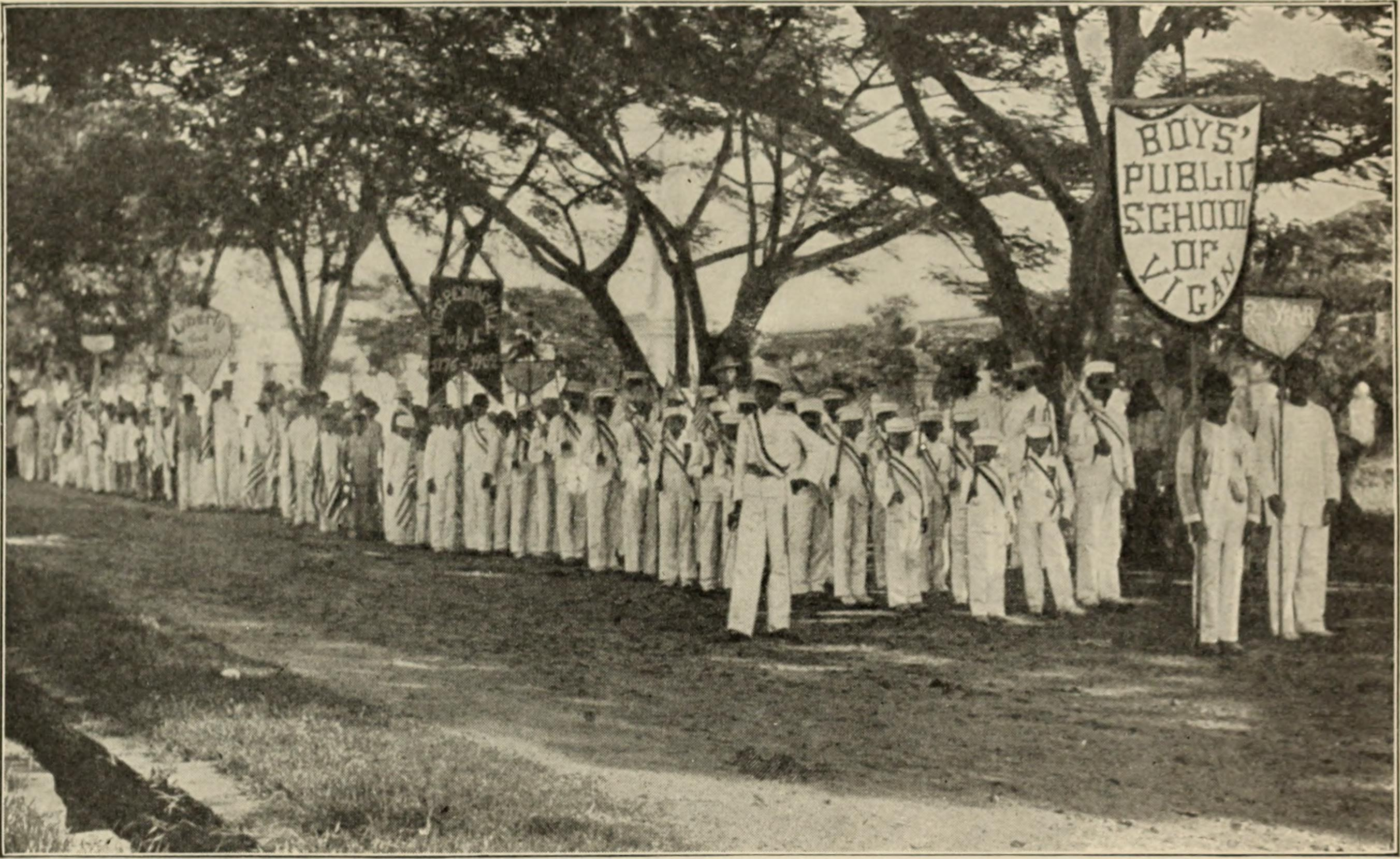
All Boys' Public School in Vigan, circa 1912.

One of the most significant initiatives of the American colonial government was the establishment of public schools, spanning Ilocano provinces such as Abra, La Union, Pangasinan, Ilocos Norte, Ilocos Sur, and Cagayan. A group of American teachers known as the Thomasites were tasked with promoting "Americanization" through education. English became the primary medium of instruction, and students were taught American ideals and values. A notable product of this educational initiative was Camilo Osias, an Ilocano student from Balaoan, who later pursued further studies in the United States and became a prominent educator and public servant.

Public health also saw significant improvements during American rule. To combat widespread diseases such as cholera, the U.S. introduced public health initiatives, establishing hospitals and other medical services across Ilocandia. These efforts contributed to the overall improvement of the population's health and well-being.

==== Ilocano Migration ====
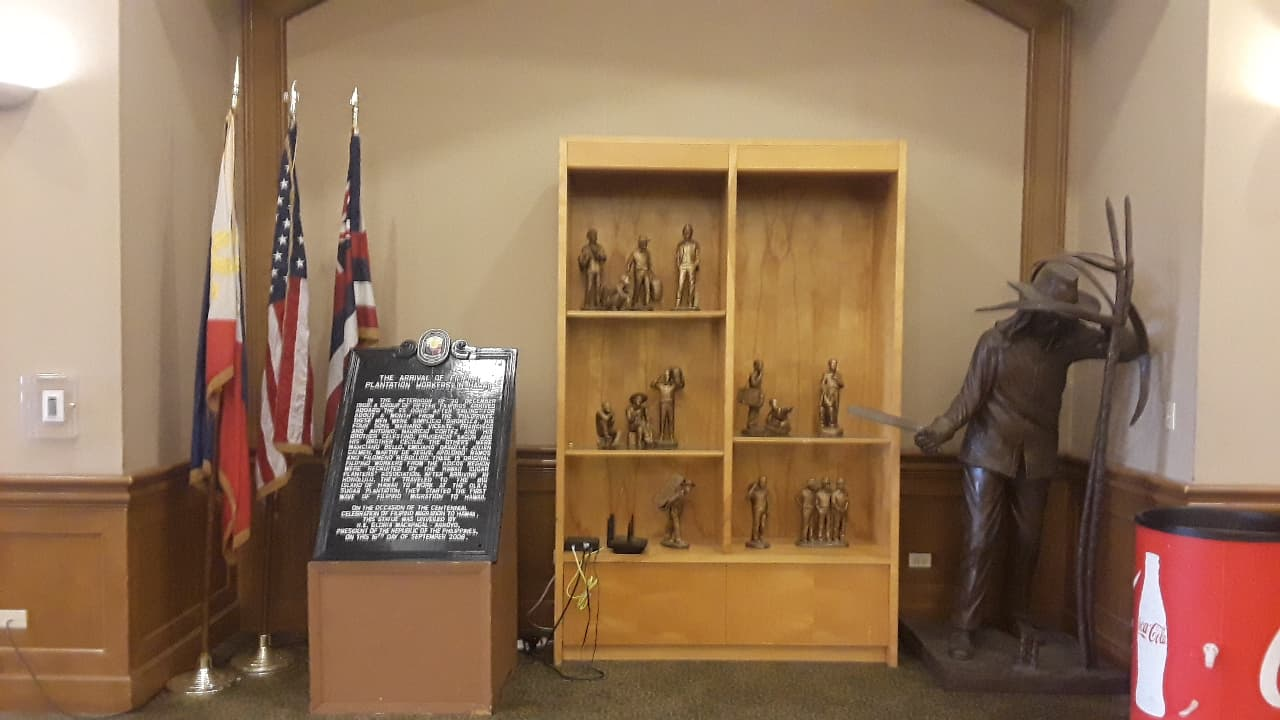
NHCP historical marker for the Sakadas in Hawaii, commemorating their contributions to the Filipino community.

The American colonial period also marked a significant chapter in the larger history of Filipino migration. In 1906, the first group of Ilocano migrants, known as the "Sakadas," were recruited by Albert F. Judd of the Hawaiian Sugar Planters Association (HSPA) to work on sugarcane plantations in Hawaii. This migration wave continued until 1919 and was a defining moment in the history of Ilocano emigration.

Between 1906 and 1930, over 30,000 Ilocanos migrated to Hawaii and California in search of better economic opportunities, particularly in agricultural work. The Ilocano community played a central role in shaping the Filipino workforce in Hawaii and the broader U.S. agricultural economy. As a result, according to the U.S. Census Bureau, about 85% of the Filipinos in Hawaii are Ilocano and the largest Asian ancestry group in Hawaii.

=== World War II ===
In 1901, the region came under American colonial rule, and in 1941, under Japanese occupation.

During the Second World War, in 1945, the combined American and Philippine Commonwealth troops, including the Ilocano and Pangasinan guerrillas, liberated the Ilocos Region from Japanese forces.

=== Modern history ===
==== Post-independence period ====
Three modern presidents of the Republic of the Philippines hailed from the Ilocos Region: Elpidio Quirino, Ferdinand Marcos, and Fidel Ramos. Marcos expanded the original Ilocos Region by transferring the province of Pangasinan from Region III into Region I in 1973, and imposed a migration policy for Ilocanos into Pangasinan. He also expanded Ilocano influence among the ethnic peoples of the Cordilleras by including Abra, Mountain Province, and Benguet in the Ilocos region in 1973, although these were later integrated into the Cordillera Administrative Region in 1987. A third "Ilocano" President, Fidel V. Ramos, hailed from Pangasinan.

==== Martial Law era ====
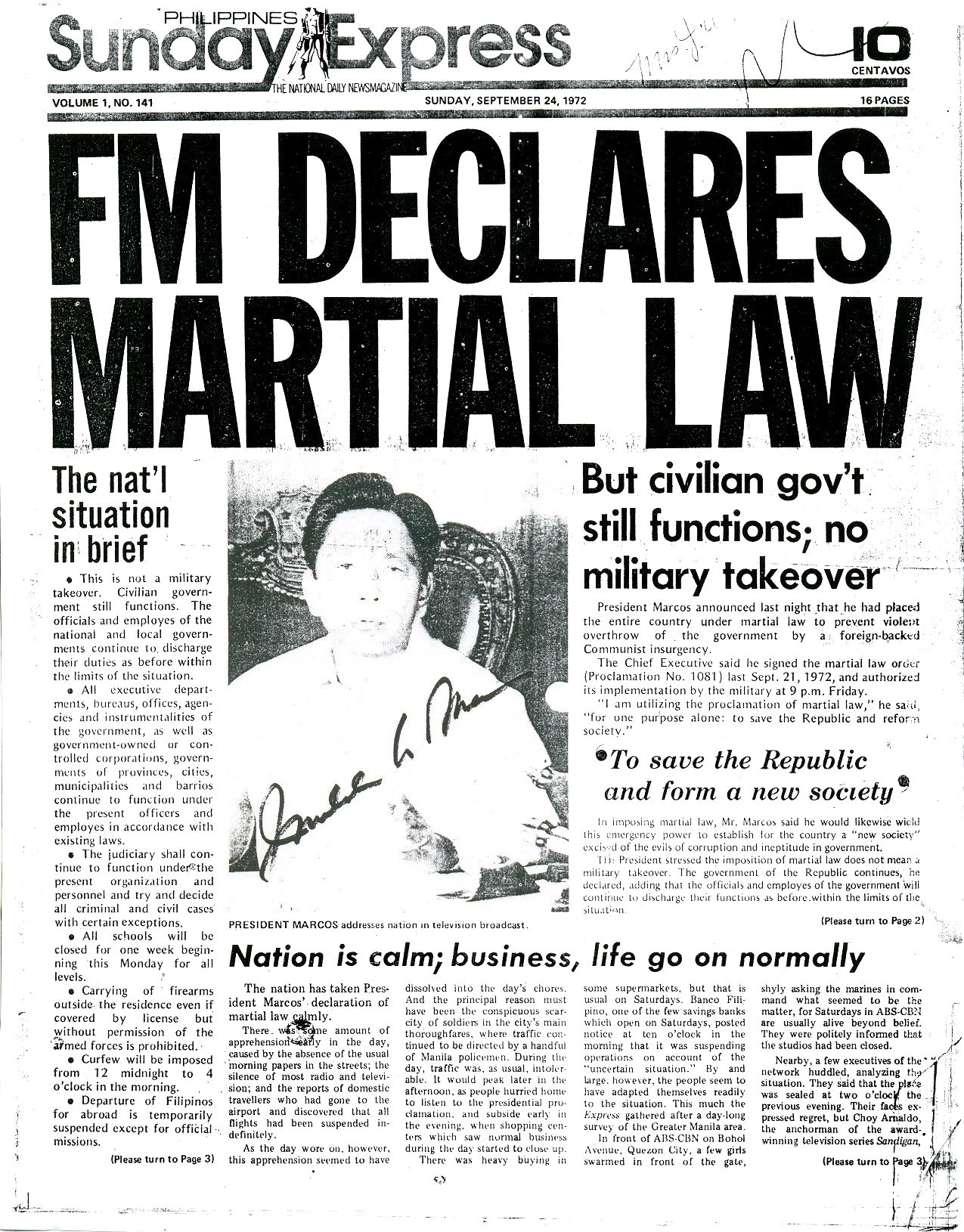
Marcos Declares Martial Law: September 24, 1972, issue of the Sunday Express (Sunday edition of the Philippines Daily Express)

Ilocanos were also among the victims of human rights violations during the martial law era which began in September 1972, despite public perception that the region was supportive of Marcos' administration. According to the Solidarity of Peasants Against Exploitation (STOP-Exploitation), various farmers from the Ilocos Norte towns of Vintar, Dumalneg, Solsona, Marcos, and Piddig were documented to have been tortured, and eight farmers in Bangui and three indigenous community members in Vintar were forcibly disappeared (euphemistically, "salvaged") in 1984.

Ilocanos who were critical of Marcos' authoritarian rule included Roman Catholic Archbishop and Agoo native Antonio L. Mabutas, who spoke actively against the torture and killings of church workers. Another prominent opponent of the martial law regime was human rights advocate and Bombo Radyo Laoag program host David Bueno, who worked with the Free Legal Assistance Group in Ilocos Norte during the later part of the Marcos administration and the early part of the succeeding Corazon Aquino administration. Bueno was assassinated by motorcycle-riding men in fatigue uniforms on October 22, 1987 – part of a wave of assassinations which coincided with the 1986–87 coup d'état which tried to unseat the democratic government set up after the 1986 People Power Revolution.

Others critics included student activists Romulo and Armando Palabay of San Fernando, La Union, who were tortured and killed in a Philippine military camp in Pampanga; and Purificacion Pedro, a Catholic lay social worker who tried to help the indigenous peoples in the resistance against the Chico River Dam Project, but was caught in the crossfire of a military operation, and was later murdered in the hospital by a soldier who claimed she was a rebel sympathizer.

Bueno, Pedro, and the Palabay brothers would later be honored as martyrs of the fight against the dictatorship at the Philippines' Bantayog ng mga Bayani memorial.

== Demographics ==
Distribution of the Ilocano population across Philippine provinces, shown as a percentage of each province's total population.

According to the Philippine Statistics Authority's 2020 report on ethnicity, the Ilocano people are the third-largest ethnolinguistic group in the Philippines, numbering 8,746,169 individuals, or 8.0% of the national population, after the Tagalog and Cebuano groups. Despite their widespread presence throughout the Philippines and overseas, the largest concentration of Ilocanos remains in their traditional homeland. In the Ilocos Region, they comprise 58.3% of the population, totaling 3,083,391, with Pangasinan hosting the largest number (1,258,746), followed by La Union (673,312), Ilocos Sur (580,484), and Ilocos Norte (570,849).

In Northern Luzon, particularly in provinces adjacent to the Ilocos Region, Ilocanos have also become the dominant ethnolinguistic group. In the Cagayan Valley, they number 2,274,435, representing 61.8% of the population, with the largest share in Isabela (1,074,212). In the Cordillera Administrative Region, Ilocanos total 396,713, or 22.1% of the population, with the highest concentrations in Abra (145,492) and Benguet, including Baguio City (138,022).

Outside Northern Luzon, Ilocanos are present in other parts of Luzon. In Central Luzon, they number 1,335,283 or 10.8% of the regional population, primarily in Tarlac (555,000) and Nueva Ecija (369,864). In the National Capital Region, 762,629 Ilocanos reside mainly in Quezon City (213,602) and Manila (112,016). In Southern Luzon, populations include 330,774 in CALABARZON, 117,635 in MIMAROPA, and 15,434 in the Bicol Region.

In the Visayas, 13,079 Ilocanos were recorded, with the largest numbers in Eastern Visayas (4,797), particularly in Leyte (1,840). In Mindanao, they total 416,796, mainly in SOCCSKSARGEN (248,033), with Sultan Kudarat hosting 97,983. Other significant populations are found in the Davao Region (75,907), Northern Mindanao (30,845), the Zamboanga Peninsula (20,232), CARAGA (24,211), and BARMM (17,568). The distribution of Ilocanos in Mindanao reflects migration during the 1930s.

Top 10 distribution of the Ilocano population by region, province, and independent city in the Philippines.
Region	Population	Province	Population	Independent City	Population
Ilocos Region	3,083,391	Pangasinan	1,258,746	Quezon City	213,602
Cagayan Valley	2,274,435	Isabela	1,074,212	Manila City	112,016
Central Luzon	1,335,283	Cagayan	820,546	Baguio City	108,062
National Capital Region	762,629	La Union	673,312	Caloocan City	97,212
Cordillera Administrative Region	396,713	Ilocos Sur	580,484	Taguig City	54,668
CALABARZON	330,774	Ilocos Norte	570,849	Makati City	44,732
SOCCSKSARGEN	248,033	Tarlac	550,000	Valenzuela City	36,744
MIMAROPA	117,635	Nueva Ecija	369,864	Pasig City	35,671
Davao Region	75,907	Nueva Vizcaya	261,901	Pasay City	29,356
Northern Mindanao	30,845	Zambales	163,468	Parañaque City	27,235

=== Diaspora ===
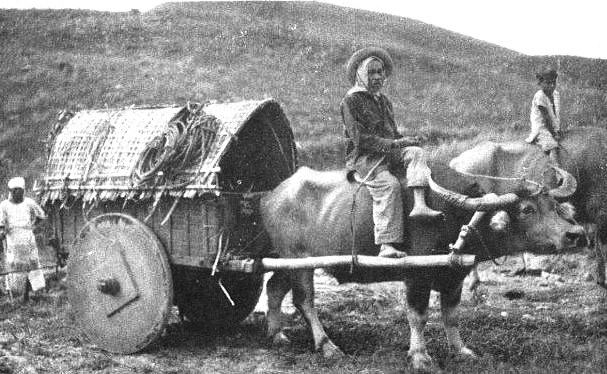
Ilocanos migrating to the Cagayan Valley, circa 1920.

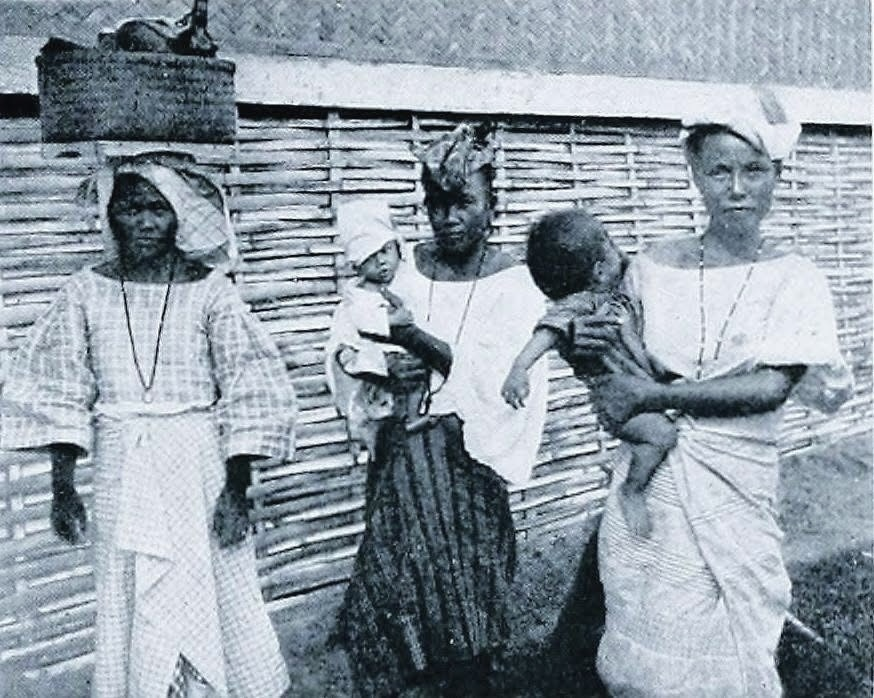
Ilocano migrants in Victoria, Tarlac, circa 1905.

The Ilocano diaspora is a complex blend of both forced and voluntary migration. It represents the broader narrative of "leaving the homeland" driven by economic necessity, social upheaval, and the quest for better opportunities. Ilocanos, primarily from the Ilocos Region in the Philippines, have historically migrated to escape oppressive conditions imposed by Spanish colonizers and to seek new opportunities.

Ilocano diaspora dates back to the 19th century when Ilocanos began migrating to various parts of the country to seek employment and cultivate land. As early as 1903, they moved and settled in nearby provinces in Luzon. A study conducted on the diaspora of Ilocanos in Cagayan stated, "the reasons for Ilocano migration can be associated with economic factors which have deeper roots in the forced labor imposed by Spanish colonizers and the climatic conditions in the region that make growing crops difficult". This initial wave of migration was spurred by mounting population pressures and high density during the mid-19th century, causing many Ilocanos to leave their traditional homeland.

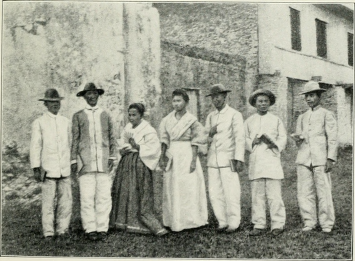
Ilocano migrants and Gaddang teachers in Solano, Nueva Vizcaya, circa 1904.

By 1903, over 290,000 Ilocanos had migrated to regions such as Central Luzon, Cagayan Valley, and Metro Manila. More than 180,000 relocated to the provinces of Pangasinan, Tarlac, and Nueva Ecija. There has historically been a sizable Ilocano population in Aurora and Quezon province, dating back to when these areas were part of Southern Tagalog and one whole province. Almost 50,000 Ilocanos moved to Cagayan Valley, with half of them residing in Isabela. Other provinces that attracted Ilocano migrants included Zambales, which housed around 47,000 migrants, and Sultan Kudarat, where more than 11,000 settled.

In subsequent years, further migrations brought Ilocanos to the Cordilleras, Mindoro, and Palawan. Between 1948 and 1960, around 15% of Ilocano migrants moved to Mindanao, establishing communities in provinces such as Sultan Kudarat, North Cotabato, South Cotabato, Bukidnon, Misamis Oriental, Caraga, and the Davao Region. Notably, Ilocanos even form a minority in Cebu City, where they organized associations for Ilocano residents and their descendants.

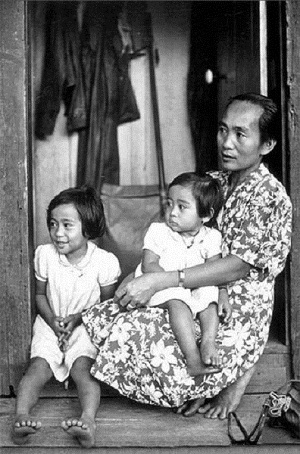
Filipino immigrant family in Hawaii, c. 1906

The Ilocano diaspora extended beyond the Philippines when, in 1906, many Ilocanos began migrating to the United States. This migration primarily aimed at finding work in agricultural plantations in Hawaii and California. The first wave of Filipino migrants to the United States consisted of the manongs and sakadas. In Ilocano, the term manong is loosely used to refer to an elderly gentleman, originally meaning "older brother", derived from the Spanish term hermano, which translates to "brother" or "sibling". Meanwhile, sakadas roughly translates to "imported ones", "lower-paid workers recruited out of the area", or "migrant workers", and denotes manual agricultural laborers who work outside their provinces.

During the early 20th century, the Hawaiian Sugar Planters' Association recruited Filipino men to work as skilled laborers in the sugarcane and pineapple fields of Hawaii. Most of these men hailed from the Ilocos region, motivated by the hope of gasat, or "fate" in Ilocano. In April 1906, the Association approved a plan to recruit labor from the Philippines and tasked Albert F. Judd with the recruitment effort. The first Filipino farm laborers in Hawaii arrived in December 1906, specifically from Candon, Ilocos Sur, aboard the SS Doric (1883). About 200 Ilocano sugar plantation workers arrived in Hawaii in 1906 and 1907. By 1929, Ilocano immigrants to Hawaii had reached 71,594. Most of the 175,000 Filipinos who went to Hawaii between 1906 and 1935 were single Ilocano men.

The Ilocano community in the United States has continued to grow, making them one of the largest groups of Filipino expatriates in the country. Many are bilingual, speaking both Ilocano and Tagalog. In Hawaii, Ilocanos constitute more than 85% of the Filipino population, maintaining their cultural identity while also integrating into the broader American society.

Today, Ilocanos can be found all over the world as migrants or Overseas Filipino Workers (OFWs), contributing to various sectors and economies in countries across the globe.

== Languages ==
Chronological dispersal of Austronesian people across the Asia-Pacific

The native language of the Ilocanos is Iloco or Iloko with 8.7 million native speaker and about 2 million as second language, classified under its own branch within the Northern Philippine subgroup of the Austronesian language family. Closely related to other Austronesian languages in Northern Luzon, it exhibits slight mutual intelligibility with the Balangao language and the eastern dialects of the Bontoc language.

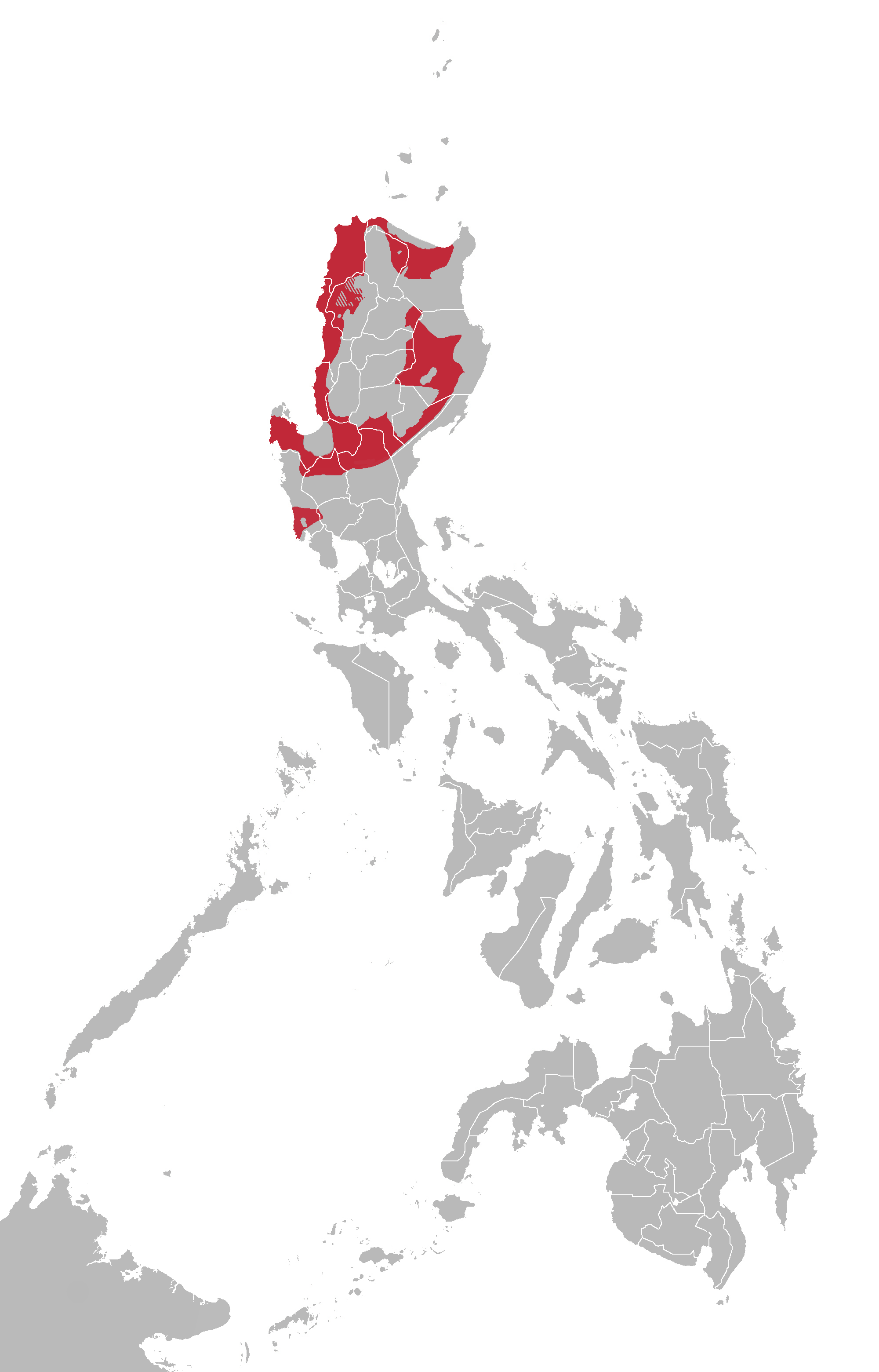
Map of the Iloco (Ilocano) language, showing its geographic distribution in the northern Philippines.

Ilocano has no official dialectology . A general accepted one is the Amianan (North) and Abagatan distinction, however they have no official basis other than the sound of schwa /ə/. Other distinctions like the so-called "Cordilleran" dialect (mainly talking about Baguio-Benguet) have no formal studies as of now. In 2012, it was declared the official language of the province of La Union.

Ilocanos are predominantly trilingual, with Iloco as their first language and Filipino (Tagalog) and English as their second languages. Due to migration and interactions with other ethnolinguistic groups, some Ilocanos have also become multilingual, acquiring proficiency in various regional languages.

In Pangasinan, some Ilocanos can understand or speak Pangasinan and Bolinao. In the Cagayan Valley, Ilocanos may have varying degrees of familiarity with Ibanag, Itawis, Ivatan, Gaddang, Yogad, Isinai, and Bugkalot. In Central Luzon, particularly in the provinces of Zambales and Tarlac, Ilocanos may also have knowledge of Sambal and Kapampangan.

In the Cordillera Administrative Region, Iloco serves as a lingua franca among different Cordilleran (Igorot) ethnolinguistic groups where it is spoken as a secondary language by over two million people. Some Ilocanos in Abra speak Itneg, while those in Benguet and Baguio may know Kankanaey and Ibaloi. In Apayao and Kalinga, they may also speak Isnag and Kalinga languages.

In Hawaii, 17% of those who speak a non-English language at home speak Iloco, making it the most spoken non-English language in the state.

Ilocanos who have migrated to Mindanao, particularly in the Soccsksargen and Caraga region, often adopt Hiligaynon, Cebuano, or other indigenous languages, such as Butuanon and Surigaonon, due to cultural integration with local ethnic groups. Over time, many Ilocanos in Mindanao have assimilated into the Cebuano-speaking majority (Hiligaynon-speaking in case of Soccsksargen), often identifying as Visayans.

While some retain Ilocano as a second or third language, younger generations in Mindanao primarily speak Cebuano or Hiligaynon, with limited knowledge of Ilocano. In Zamboanga City and Basilan, Ilocanos and their descendants commonly speak Chavacano, reflecting the region's distinct linguistic landscape and cultural diversity.

The pre-colonial writing system of the Ilocano people, known as kur-itan or kurdita, has garnered interest in recent years, with proposals to revive the script through educational initiatives in Ilocano-majority areas such as Ilocos Norte and Ilocos Sur.

== Religion ==
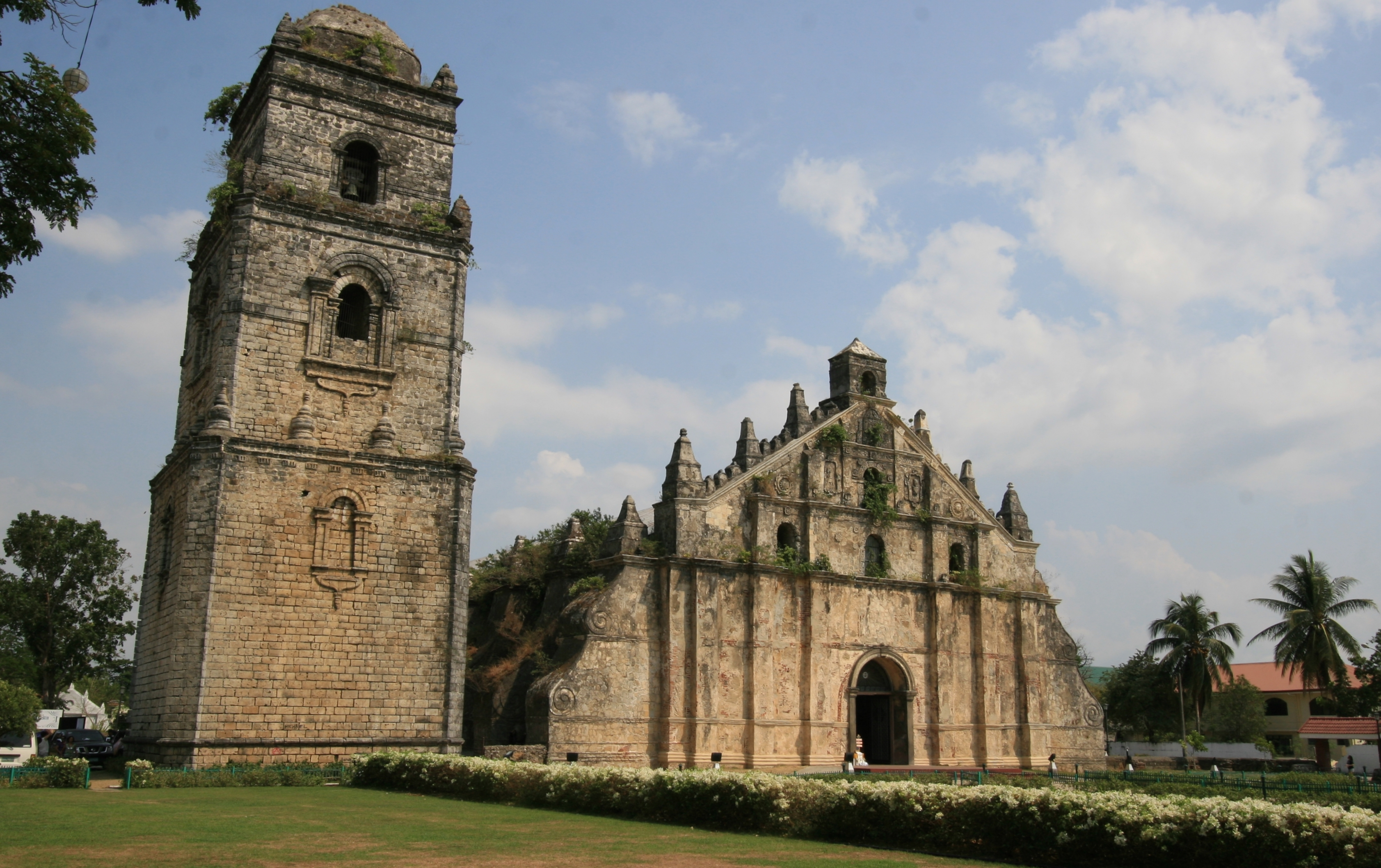
San Agustin Church of Paoay, a Catholic Baroque church and UNESCO World Heritage Site, and one of the most significant religious landmarks for Ilocano devotees.

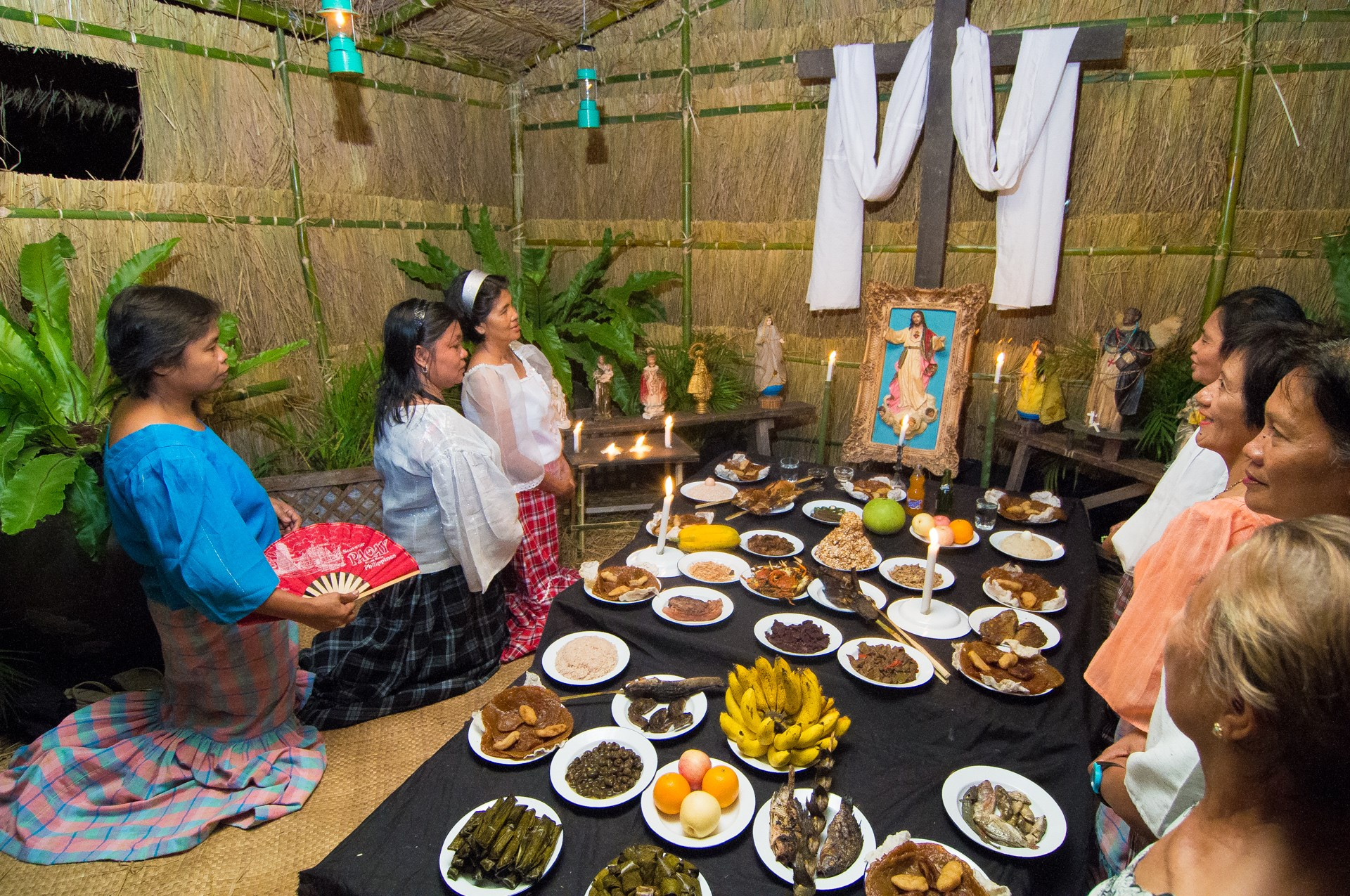
Tumba, a traditional practice of honoring the dead during All Saints' Day in Paoay, featuring atang (also known as umras), a traditional Ilocano food offering, alongside Catholic religious symbols, illustrating Ilocano folk Catholicism.

The Ilocanos are predominantly Roman Catholic, a result of the introduction of Christianity during the Spanish colonization in the mid-16th century. Many Ilocanos also integrate indigenous rituals and pre-colonial customs into their religious practice, creating a form of folk Catholicism. This syncretic blend of Catholic doctrine and animist traditions has played a central role in shaping Ilocano spiritual life and cultural practices.

=== Christianity ===
Roman Catholicism – the dominant religion among the Ilocanos, It was introduced in the 16th century by Spanish missionaries, particularly the Augustinian friars, and has significantly influenced Ilocano culture, social life, and moral values. The Bible serves as the central text for religious teachings, while the Sabbath Day is traditionally observed as a day of worship and rest.

Religious festivals (fiestas) honoring local patron saints (santos) are a key aspect of Catholic practice, typically including masses, processions, music, dance, and feasting. Notable examples include the Paoay Church Fiesta for Saint Augustine and celebrations dedicated to the Virgin Mary.

Major Catholic observances include Holy Week (Semana Santa or Nasantuan a Lawas), featuring processions, novenas recounting the Passion of Jesus, and leccio, a lament by Mary similar to the traditional mourning ritual dung-aw. All Saints' Day and All Souls' Day (Todos los Santos and Pista Natay/Aldaw Dagiti Kararua) involve cemetery visits, prayers, flowers, and offerings (atang) for deceased relatives.

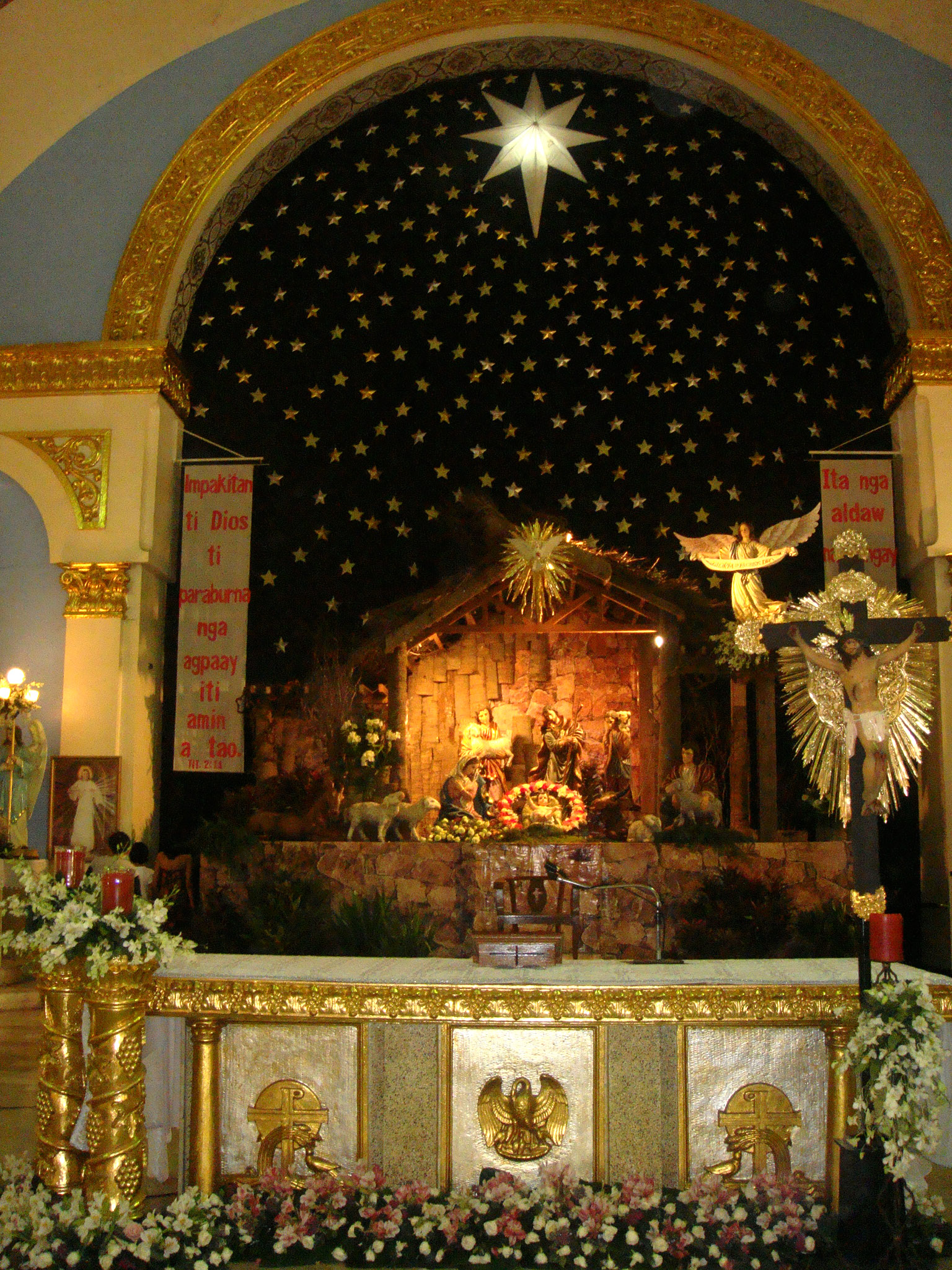
Iglesia Parroquial de San Juan de Sahagún in Candon, illustrating the Nativity of Jesus during Paskua (Christmas).

The Christmas season (Paskua) is also widely celebrated. Festivities begin with the Misa de Aguinaldo and Misa de Gallo (Simbang Gabi), a series of nine dawn masses leading up to Christmas Day. Christmas is further marked by feasts, gift-giving, and the display of parols (traditional star-shaped lanterns) symbolizing the Star of Bethlehem.

Other Denominations – Other Christian groups are present among the Ilocanos, The Philippine Independent Church, or Iglesia Filipina Independiente (Aglipayan Church), was founded in 1902 by Father Gregorio Aglipay, an Ilocano priest and revolutionary from Ilocos Norte. It emerged as a nationalist response to Spanish control over the Catholic Church and emphasizes Filipino identity and independence. While it shares many rituals with Roman Catholicism, the Aglipayan Church focuses on nationalism. Protestant denominations were introduced primarily through American missionaries during the colonial period. Churches such as the United Church of Christ in the Philippines and Iglesia ni Cristo established congregations in Ilocano communities, providing alternatives to Catholicism. These denominations emphasize personal relationships with God, the authority of the Bible, and community involvement.

=== Indigenous Belief ===
The early Ilocanos practiced an indigenous animistic religion, believing that spirits inhabited natural objects and celestial bodies, alongside a supreme creator and other spiritual beings who governed nature and human affairs. Their practices focused on rituals and offerings to maintain harmony and evolved through contact with neighboring Cordillerans (Igorot), Tagalog, and Chinese cultures.

In Ilocano mythology, the giant Aran formed the sky and placed the sun, moon, and stars, while his companion Angalo shaped the land into mountains and valleys; from Angalo emerged the first man and woman, who were cast in a bamboo tube into the sea and eventually washed ashore in the Ilocos region as the ancestors of the Ilocano people.

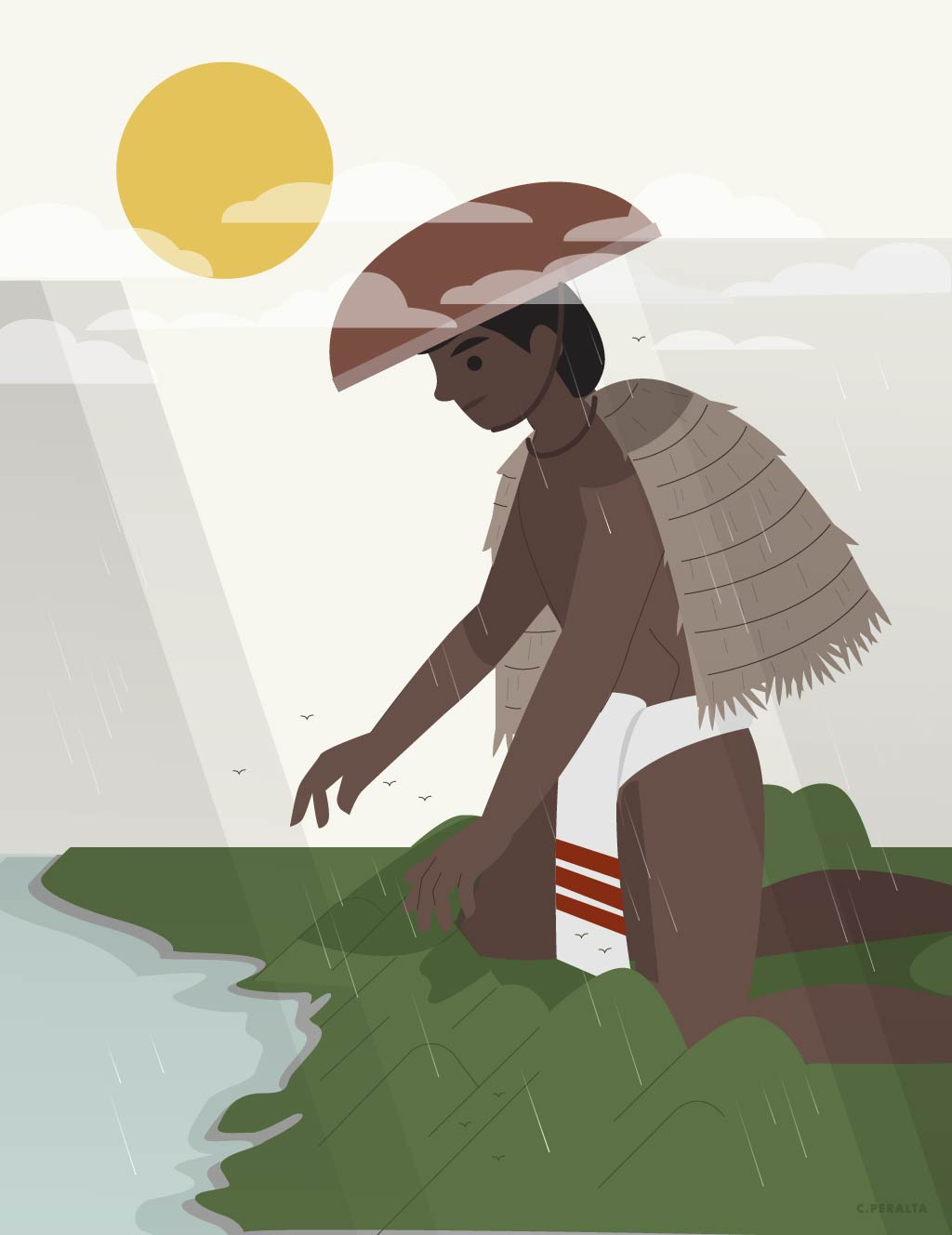
Angalo, the giant in Ilocano mythology who shaped the land and, according to legend, helped create the first humans.

Deities – In Ilocano animistic beliefs, several deities governed natural forces and human affairs. Buni was regarded as the supreme god, while Parsuá was considered the creator. Other key deities included Apo Lángit, ruler of the heavens; Apo Ángin, god of the wind; Apo Ínit, god of the sun; and Apo Túdo, god of rain. These deities were believed to be ever-present, shaping daily life and maintaining balance in the natural world. In addition, Apo Litao, the god of the sea and rivers.

Regional differences in Ilocano settlements led to variations in religious practices, often blending indigenous beliefs with those of neighboring ethnolinguistic groups. For instance, a 1952 discovered that a myth from Vigan, presents a different set of deities: Abra, the god of weather, fathered Caburayan, the goddess of healing, while Anianihan, god of harvests, Saguday, god of the wind, and Revenador, god of thunder and lightning also play key roles. This demonstrates how Ilocano cosmology was shaped by both local diversity and external influences.

The influence of trade is evident in many Ilocano myths. Figures such as Maria Makiling, also found in Tagalog folklore, indicate the incorporation of elements from neighboring regions, while features like the use of lobo (Spanish for wolf) reflect Spanish colonial influence. Vigan, a major trade hub even before Spanish arrival, had extensive interactions with Chinese merchants, whose stories likely shaped local myths. Scholars also note that Ilocano epics, including the famous Biag ni Lam-ang, contain traces of Hindu and Southeast Asian mythology, reflecting the impact of precolonial trade routes linked to the Majapahit Empire.

Spirits – Anito an Ilocano term for spirits thought to inhabit and influence both the natural and spiritual realms. These beings were believed to be either protective or harmful, depending on how humans interacted with them. Different spirits were associated with specific elements of the environment, including the litao, which dwelled in bodies of water, the kaibáan, linked to forest undergrowth, and the mangmangkik, believed to reside in trees. Acts such as cutting trees or disposing of hot water without observing proper rituals were thought to offend these spirits and could bring about illness or misfortune.

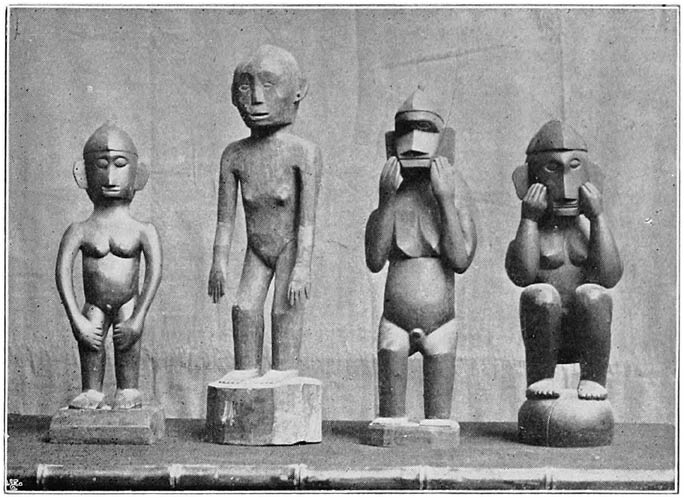
Anitos of Northern Philippine tribes (c. 1900), including Ilocanos, depicting traditional spirits worshiped in pre-colonial animistic practices.

To prevent offending these spirits, ritual practices were observed that included the recitation of specific incantations. Before cutting down a tree, for example, a chant was performed to address the mangmangkik, seeking permission, forgiveness, and protection. Similar rituals were conducted for the kaibáan and other spirits, reflecting a strong reverence for the natural environment. One such chant recited prior to felling a tree is as follows:

Bari Bari.
Dikat agunget pari.
Ta pumukan kami.
Iti pabakirda kadakami.

Cosmology – Aran created the sky and set the sun, moon, and stars, while his companion Angalo shaped the land and produced the first humans by spitting on the earth. Their cosmology revolves around suróng (upstream), representing life and creation, and puyupoyán (downstream), symbolizing death and the afterlife. Offerings to the dead were often floated downstream to guide the soul's journey. The Milky Way, called ariwanás or rimmuok dagiti bitbituén, was seen as a celestial river, linking water and the cosmos, while shooting stars (layáp) were associated with love, believed to carry mystical babató (stones of affection) that could be captured using specific rituals.

The goddess Sehal, representing beauty, was invoked in love letters and rituals, serving as a local counterpart to Venus. Folktales reinforce these beliefs, such as stories of lovers drowning in shallow marshes, highlighting the close connection between love, nature, and the spiritual world in Ilocano cosmology.

Soul and Afterlife – The Ilocanos believed in a multi-soul system, with each soul performing a specific function. The kararúa was comparable to the Christian soul, departing the body only at death. The karkarma could leave the body during moments of extreme fear or trauma, while the aniwaas wandered during sleep, visiting familiar places. The araria represented the soul of the deceased, which could return to the living world, often manifesting as a poltergeist or through omens such as howling dogs or breaking glass.

Elaborate death rituals accompanied these beliefs, as the souls of the dead were thought to require offerings during their transition to the afterlife. These offerings, including food and money, were meant to help the soul pay the toll to the agrakrakit, the spirit responsible for ferrying souls across rivers. The use of rivers as pathways to the afterlife reflects a broader theme in Ilocano religion, where water symbolizes both life and the passage to death.

Food Offerings – Atang is a traditional food-offering ritual intended to appease spirits (anito) and ward off harmful influences, based on the belief that spirits coexist with the living and must be respected. It is commonly performed during wakes and on Pista ti Natay (All Souls' Day).

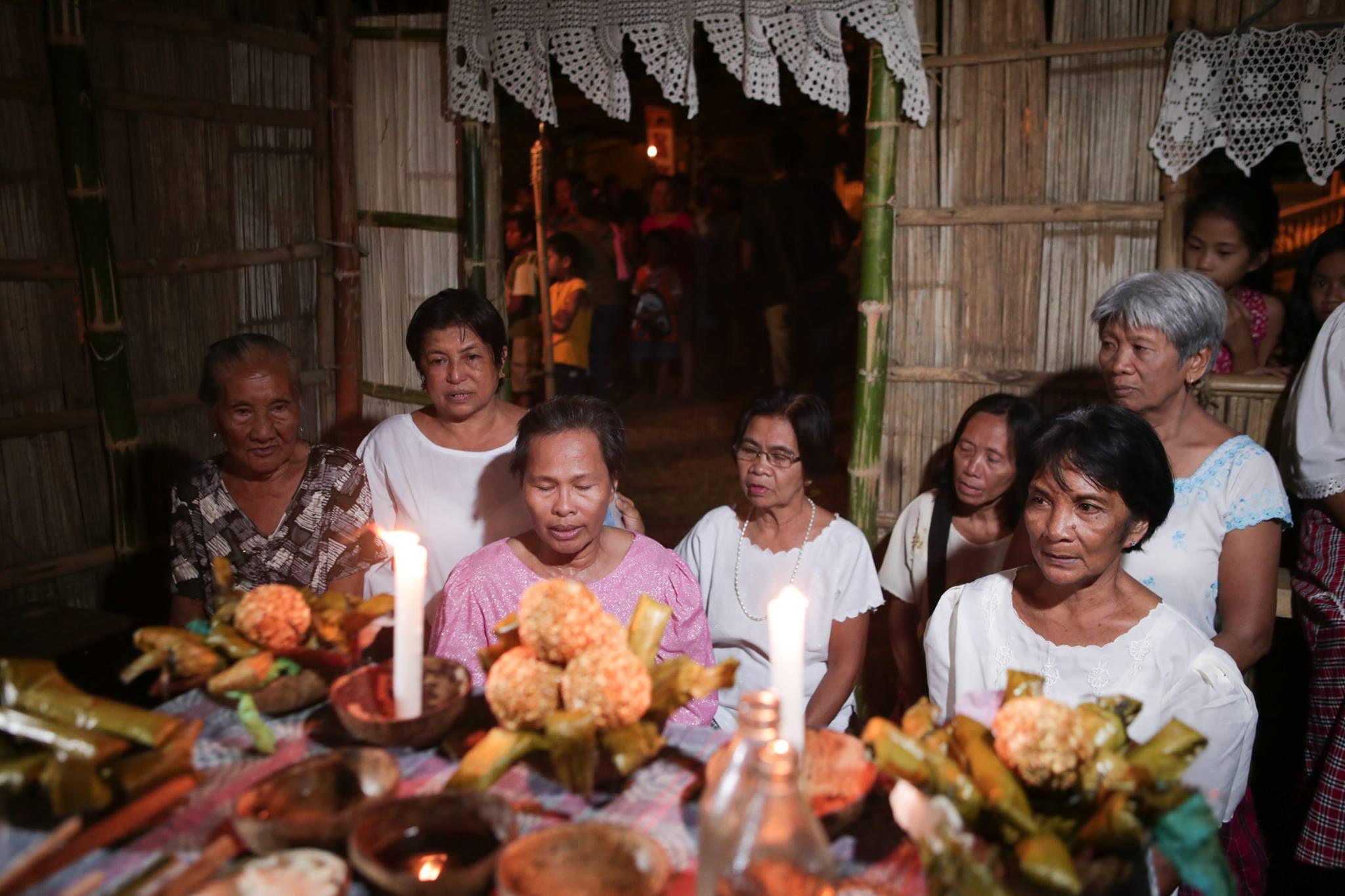
Atang displaying various food offerings, including busi (puffed rice), rice cakes, and basi (sugarcane wine), during the Tumba celebration in Paoay, Ilocos Norte, observed on All Saints' Day.

Offerings typically include kankanan (sticky rice cakes), bagas (uncooked rice), boiled eggs, búa (betel nut), gawéd or paan (piper leaf), apóg (lime powder), basi (fermented sugarcane wine), and tabako (tobacco). Traditionally placed on simbaan or in trees and caves, these offerings are now commonly set before images of the deceased or Christian religious figures, reflecting Christian influence. Prayers are offered to honor the dead and seek protection from malevolent spirits.

Ilocano belief also includes spirits such as the katawtaw-an, associated with unbaptized infants, and reverence for crocodiles (bukarot), which were viewed as ancestral beings and offered the first catch (panagyatang) to avoid misfortune.

Human Sacrifice – Sibróng was a ritual practice in early Ilocano belief associated with headhunting and human sacrifice, traditionally performed upon the death of community leaders or members of the principalía to ensure their safe passage to the afterlife. The ritual was carried out by a designated figure known as the mannibróng.

Two main forms of sibróng were recorded. One involved the taking of a victim's head, which was placed in the foundation of a bridge or structure as a symbol of strength and protection. Another form, called panagtutuyo, required the dying individual to indicate—by raising fingers—the number of persons to be sacrificed to accompany their soul; in some cases, finger amputation served as a symbolic substitute for death. Human heads were also placed in building foundations as a form of spiritual safeguarding against harm.

== Culture ==
=== Clothing and Appearances ===
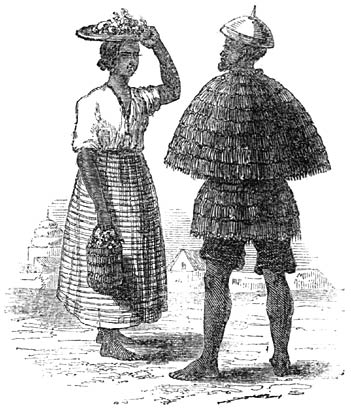
Illustration of Indios de Yloco (Ilocanos) in traditional clothing—woman in bádo (blouse) and pandilíng (skirt), man wearing a kattukóng (calabash gourd hat) and annangá (palm raincoat) c. 1820, from Adventures in the Philippine Islands by Paul P. de la Gironière.

==== Pre-Colonial Clothing ====
Before the Spanish period, Samtoy or Ilocanos dressed simply yet stylishly, reflecting social norms, available resources, and influences from bartering with Maritime Southeast Asians, neighboring Cordilleran groups like the Tinguians, and the Chinese.

Both Ilocano men and women wore an upper garment called bádo or báru, similar to the koton of the Itneg and fine Indian chininas crepe, with silk reserved for the upper class. Men wore collarless, waist-length jackets with short, wide sleeves, paired with a long, narrow loincloth called baág, anúngo, or bayakát, often richly colored and adorned with gold stripes, or sometimes trousers like those of the Tagalogs.

Women's upper garments were fitted and extended to the waist, often paired with a multicolored shawl draped over the shoulder or tied below the arm. Their lower garments included an overskirt called salupingping worn over a white underskirt, gathered at the waist with pleats on one side. Upper-class Ilocanas wore luxurious fabrics such as crimson silk (songket) woven with gold and decorated with thick fringes.

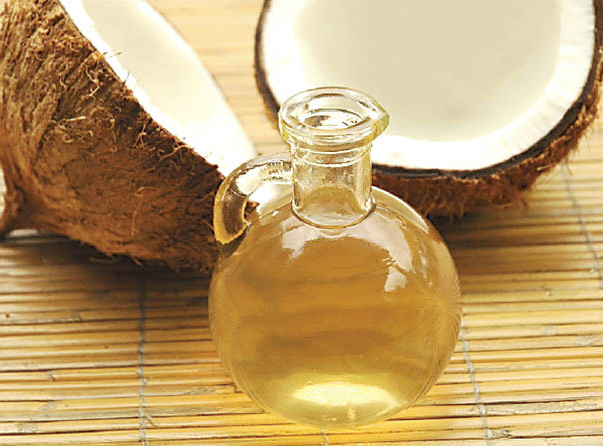
Coconut oil traditionally used to moisturize hair

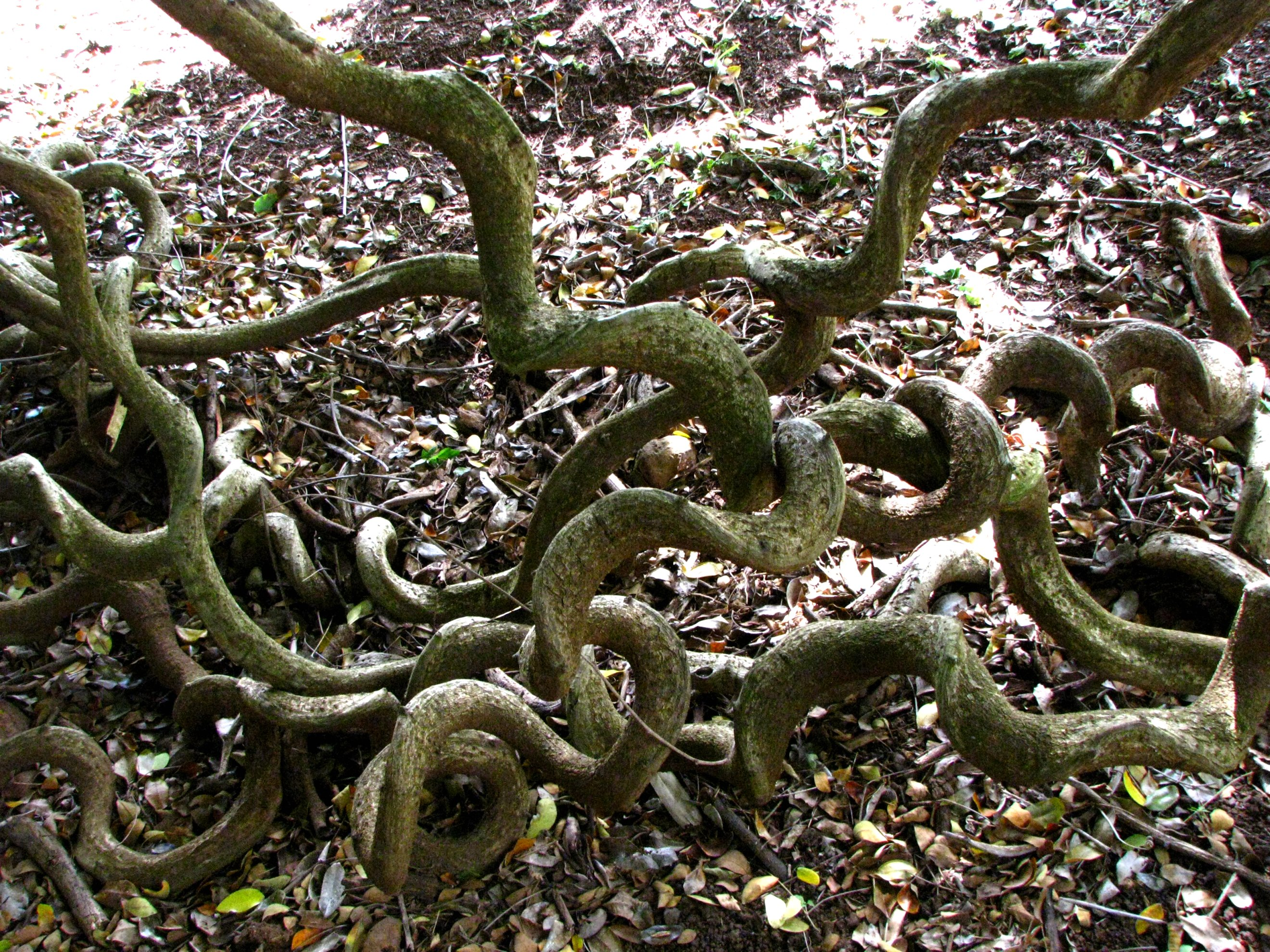
Gogo bark (Entada phaseoloides) traditionally used for washing hair and making natural hair tonic

Hair care – Both Ilocano men and women paid careful attention to their hair, using natural decoctions from tree bark, coconut oil mixed with musk and perfumes, and gogo (Entada phaseoloides) to keep it shiny and black. Lye made from rice husk was also used and remains in some areas of Ilocos today. Women styled their hair into buns on the crown, while men often removed facial hair with clam-shell tweezers, keeping a clean-shaven appearance.

Jewelry and adornments – Jewelry was an important aspect of traditional Ilocano attire, with both men and women wearing gold and precious stones. Upper-class Ilocanos wore gold chains, necklaces of gemstones, and various trinkets, similar to the gold-spun jewelry of the Itneg. A type of bracelet called kalombigas, made of gold or ivory, extended from the wrist to the elbow. Rings, anklets, and strings of colored stones such as carnelian and agate were also common.

Thick gold rings were worn in pierced earlobes, and earrings, called arítos, were also worn. Ilocanos had two main piercing styles: a larger hole, similar to the Igorots, or a smaller one, with larger piercings signaling wealth and status. Men often wore multiple gold chains, linked in a style reminiscent of European chains. Women adorned their fingers with rings made of gold and stone, and wore arítos, though historical records suggest some debate over whether older Ilocano women wore earrings in the same manner as modern women.

Dental care – From childhood, Ilocano men and women polished and sharpened their teeth using betel nut husks and stones, sometimes shaping them to be even or serrated like saws. Teeth were colored red or black to preserve them, similar to the Cordillerans. Wealthy individuals, especially women, inlaid their teeth with gold for both ornamentation and strength.

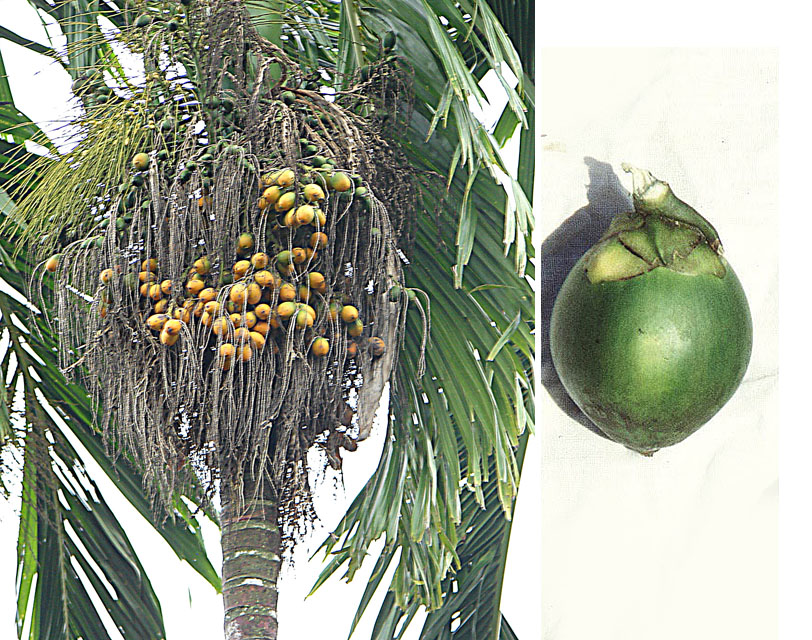
Búa (betel nut), a key ingredient in the traditional practice of mama (betel nut chewing)

Headdress – The bangal was a traditional Ilocano headdress for men, consisting of a long cloth wrapped around the head like a turban or draped over the shoulder, with embroidered ends reaching the back of the knees. The color of the bangal indicated the wearer's achievements: red signified having killed someone, while only those who had killed seven or more could wear a striped bangal. After the arrival of the Spanish, men gradually adopted hats.

Tattoos – Tattoos were also a part of Ilocano appearance called batek, butak, or burik, Ilocanos only tattooed their arms or hands though not as prevalent as among the Cordillerans (Igorots) and Visayans. Tattoos were made by pricking the skin and rubbing black pitch powder or smoke into the pricked area. While tattoos were not as widely practiced among the Ilocanos as among other groups, they still served as a form of body art and status symbol for those who had them.

==== Colonial fashion ====
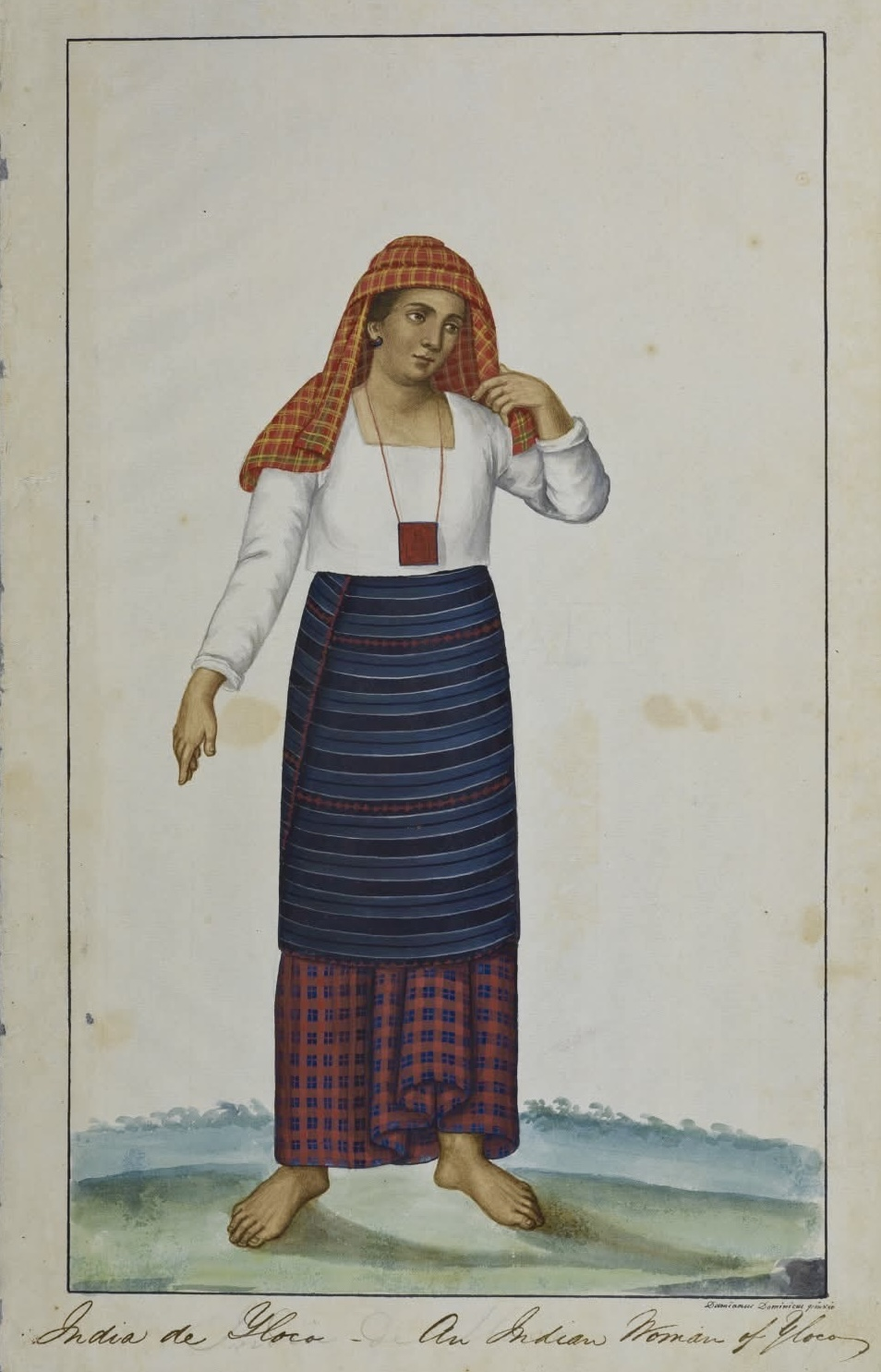
An Ilocano woman painted by Damián Domingo, c. 1820s, wearing traditional attire consisting of a bádo (blouse), bidáng (wrap-around skirt), and pandilíng (skirt), typically made from inabel (abel Iloko) textile.

With the arrival of Spanish colonizers, Ilocano clothing and appearance underwent significant changes. While many indigenous practices persisted, new styles of dress were introduced. The traje de mestiza was commonly worn by lowland Christian women and, among Ilocanos, by the principalia or babaknáng class during the colonial period. It consisted of a long embroidered gown with voluminous sleeves that combined indigenous and European influences and was worn during formal and ceremonial occasions.

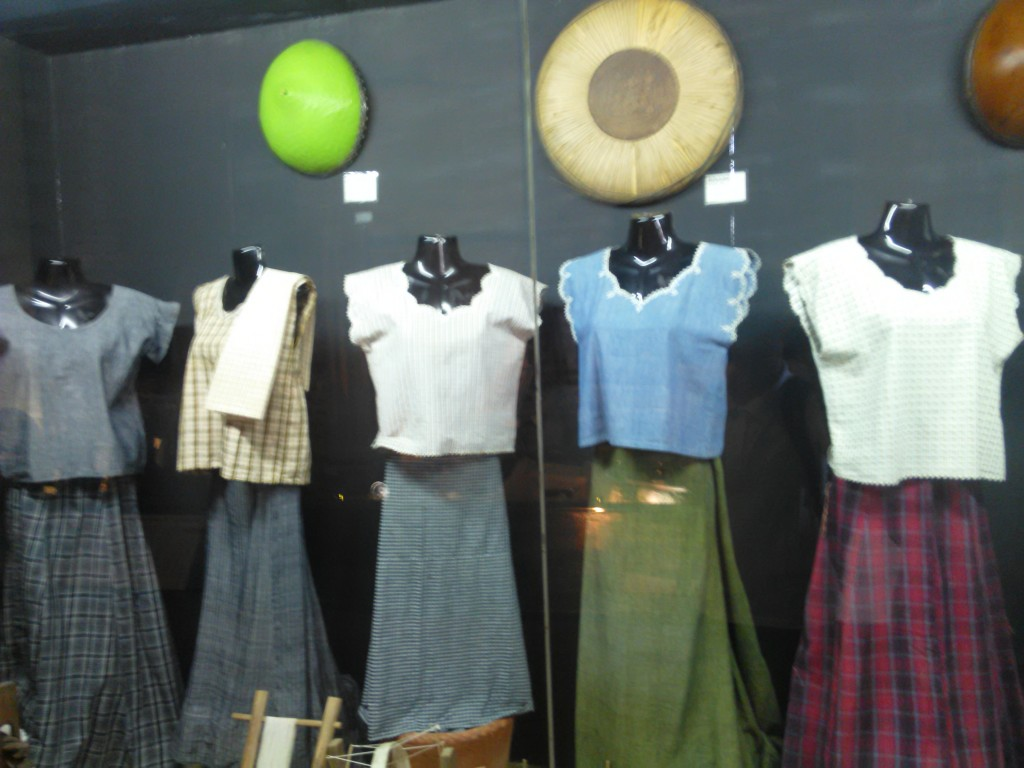
An Ilocano woman's traditional attire on display at the Museo Ilocos Norte, consisting of a pandilíng (skirt) and kimona or bádo (blouse).

Traditional Ilocano women's attire typically consisted of a two-piece ensemble composed of a blouse and skirt. The blouse, known as bádo or kimona, was usually plain white or pastel-colored and featured a cowl neckline, while the full-length skirt, called pandilíng, was cone-shaped and secured with a drawstring at the waist. A full slip known as kamison was worn underneath. These garments were commonly made from inabel, a handwoven textile produced by Ilocano women and characterized by patterns inspired by nature, such as diamonds, shells, and stripes.

The ensemble was often complemented by a colorful wrap-around cloth called bidáng, worn as a broad sash from the waist to the knee. Everyday footwear included leather tsinelas, while formal occasions.

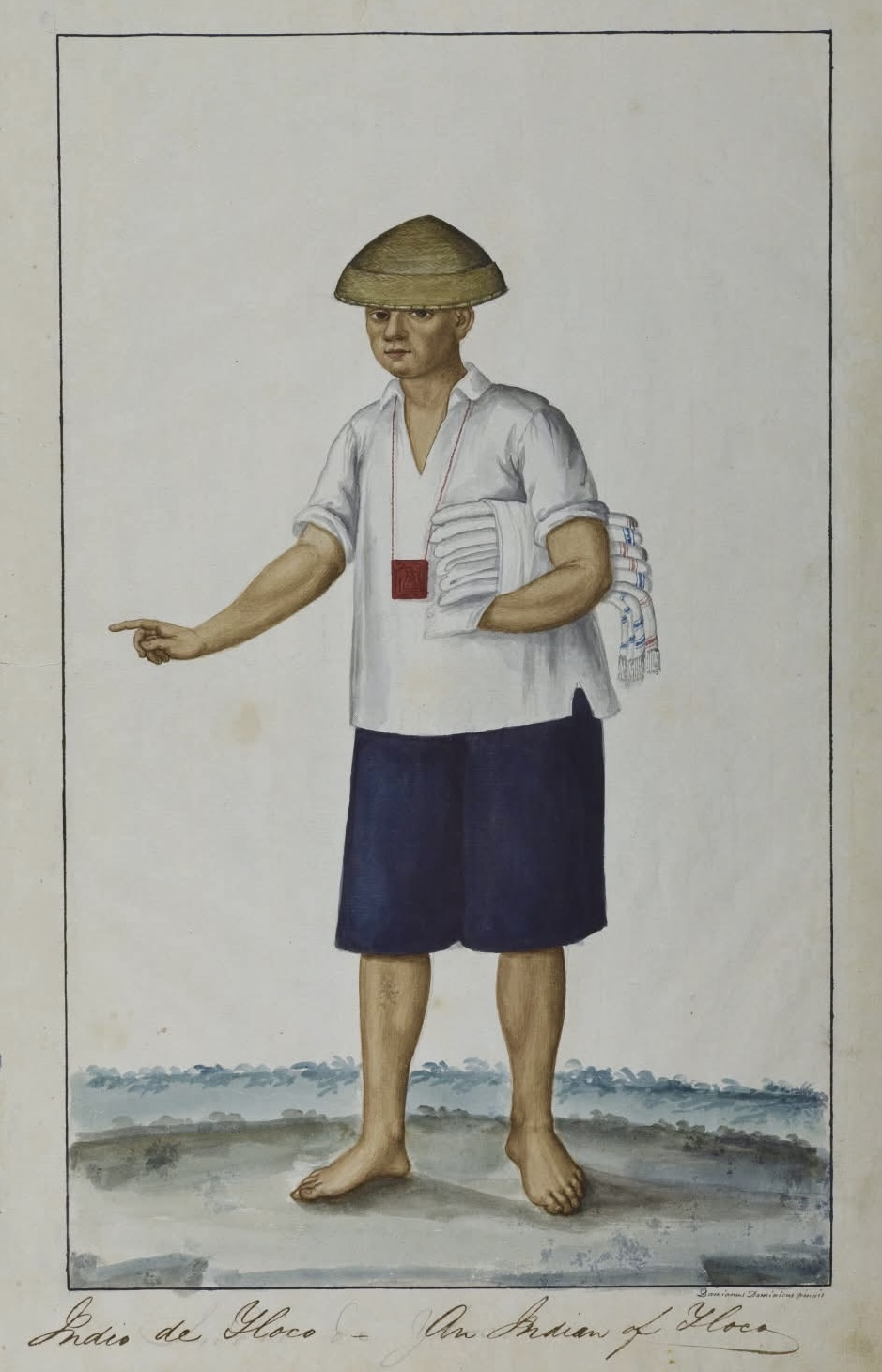
An Ilocano man wearing a bádu and kattukóng while holding an abel Ilóco, painted by Damián Domingo, c. 1820s.

While Ilocano men wear a thin cotton, collarless, and cuffless shirt with a few buttons extending a short distance below the neckline, called camisa de tsino or bádo (either sleeveless or with sleeves), a style attributed to Chinese laborers during and before the Spanish colonial period in the Philippines.

=== Visual arts and crafts ===
The Ilocano people are known for their skill and creativity in traditional arts and crafts, passed down through generations. These include weaving (abel), woodcarving, and pottery (damili), which historically served practical purposes such as food storage, cooking, and clothing. Today, these crafts hold cultural and economic significance, with artisans producing innovative products for local and global markets.

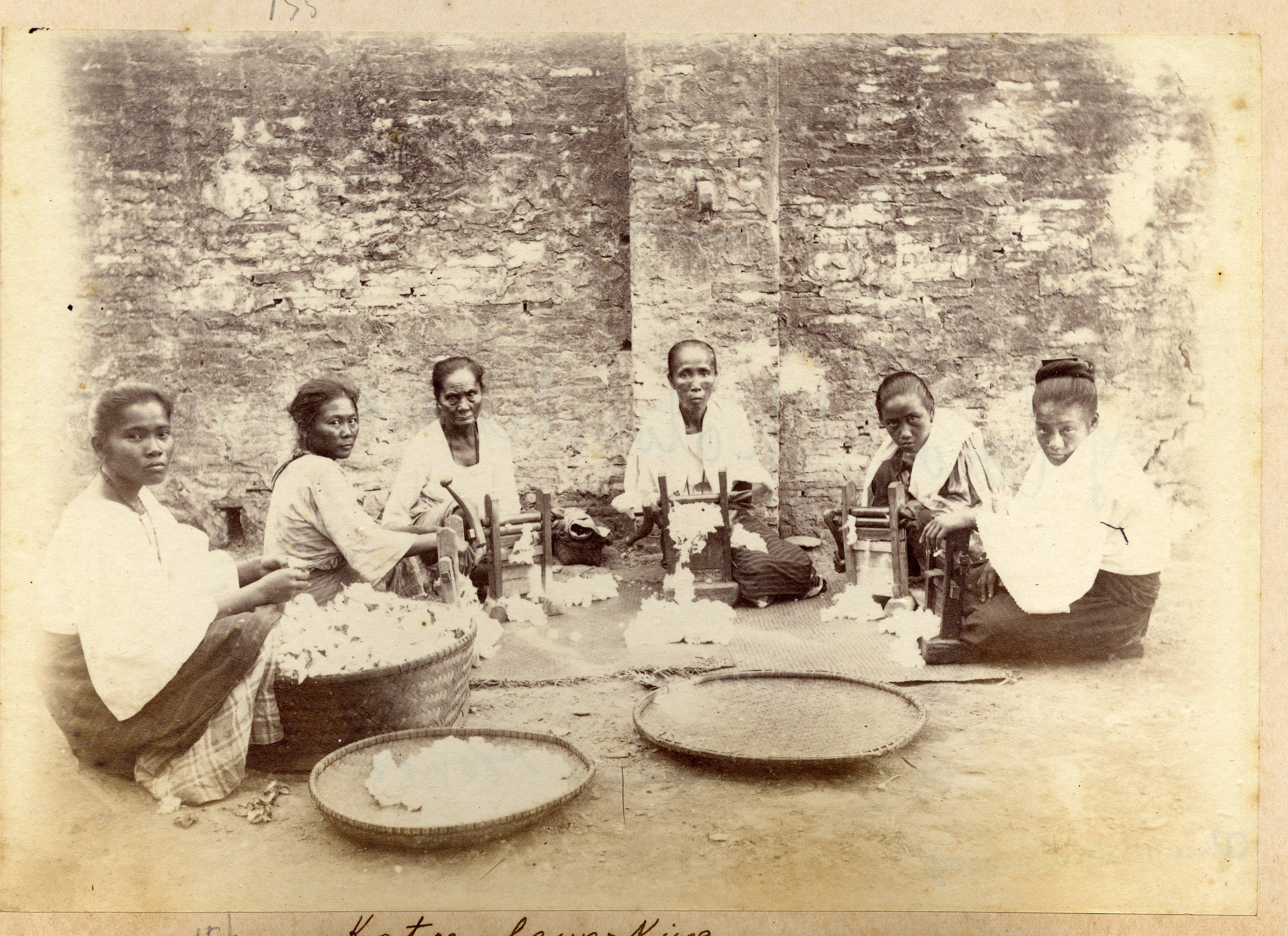
Ilocano women processing cotton for weaving, circa 1885.

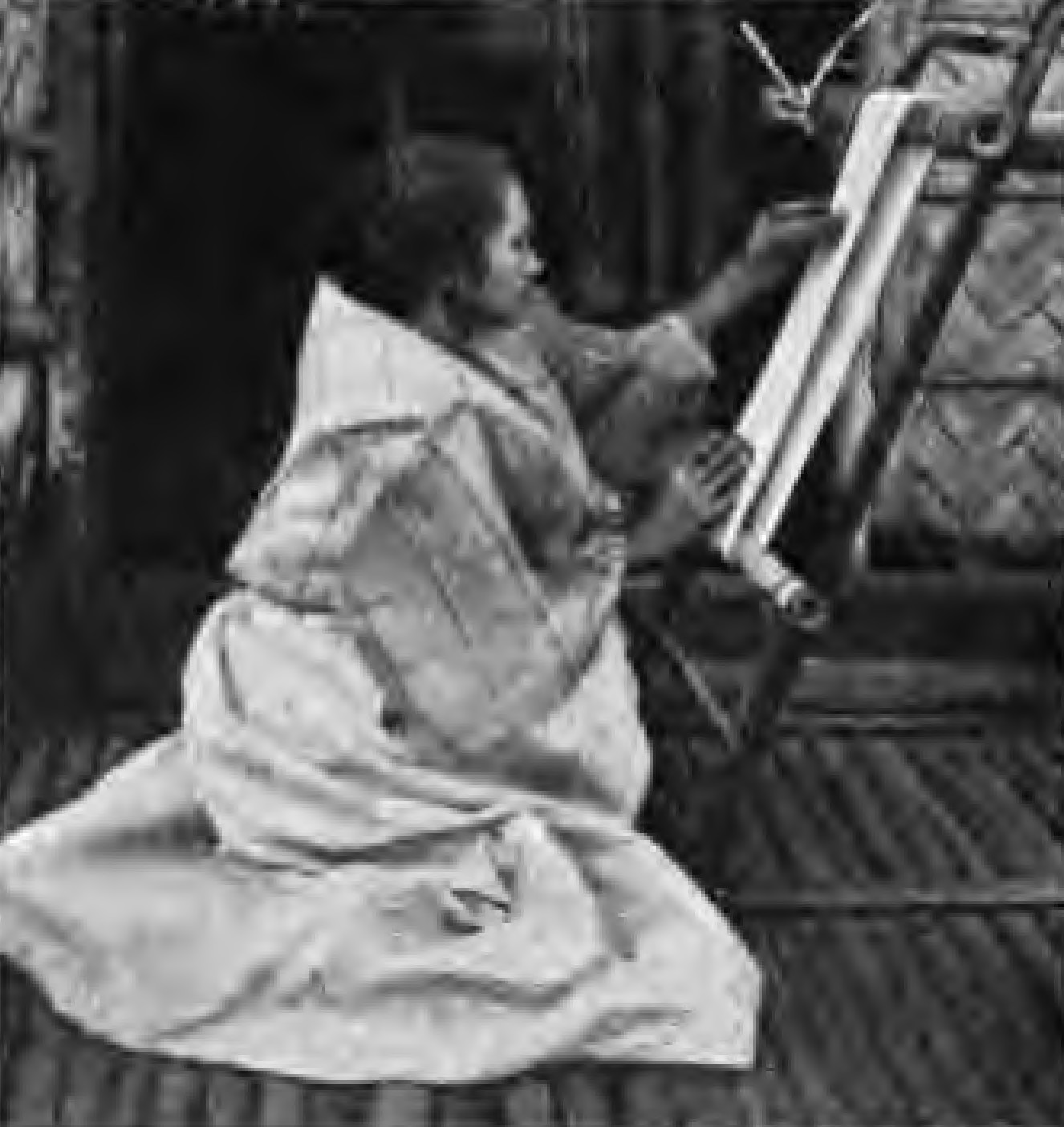
Ilocano woman combing cotton yarn, c. 1900s.

==== Weaving (abél) ====
Abél – is the Ilocano term for weaving, while panagabél refers to the traditional process of creating handspun cotton fabric on wooden pedal looms. This practice is central to Ilocano culture, producing inabél, a fabric known for its softness, durability, and intricate patterns. Each province in the Ilocos Region features distinct designs, including binakul, believed to ward off evil spirits, as well as pinilian (brocades), suk-suk (discontinuous supplementary weft), and the ikat tie-dye techniques. Common motifs include cat's paws, fans, stars, and windows.

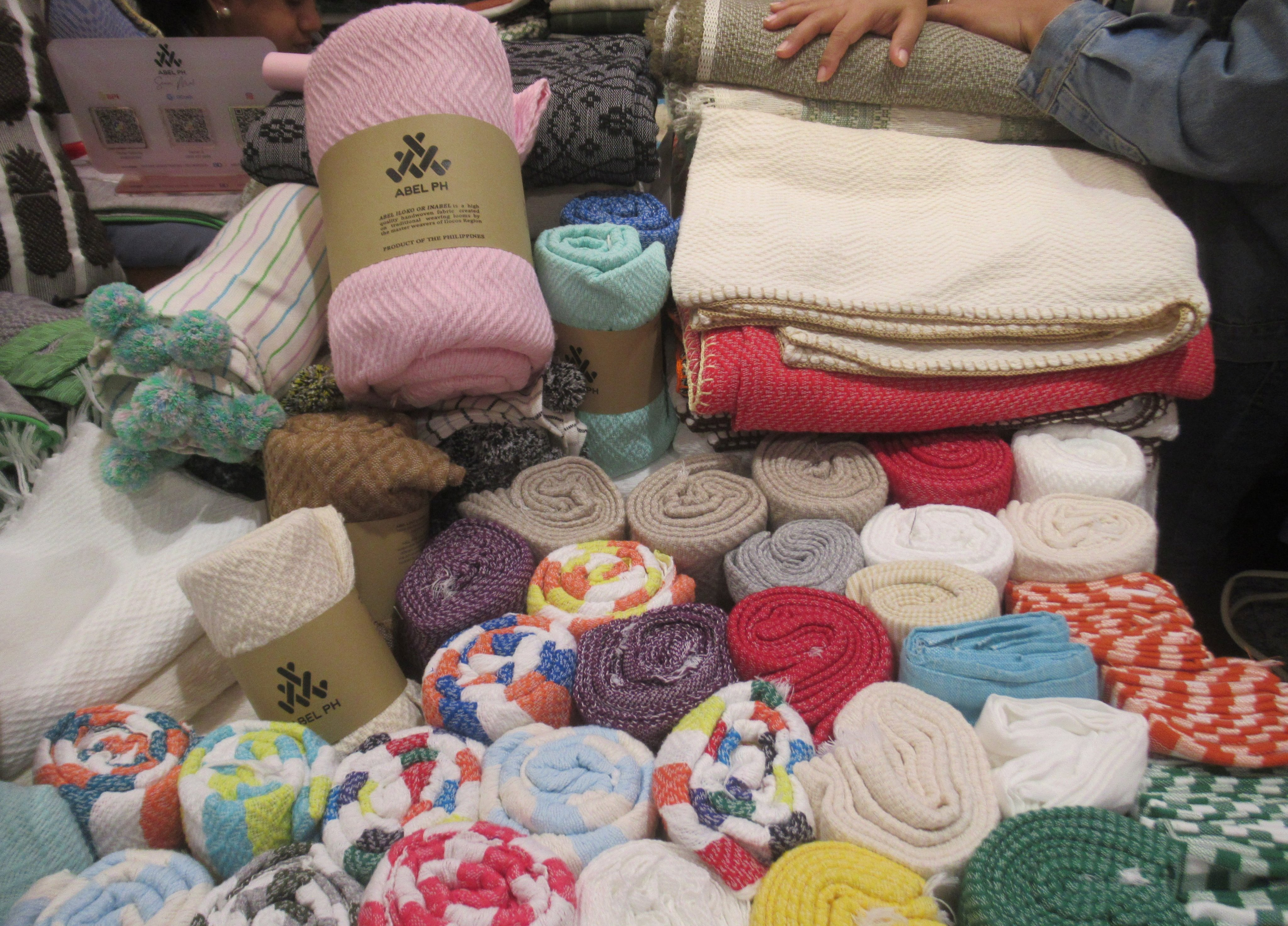
Inabel products from Candon, Ilocos Sur

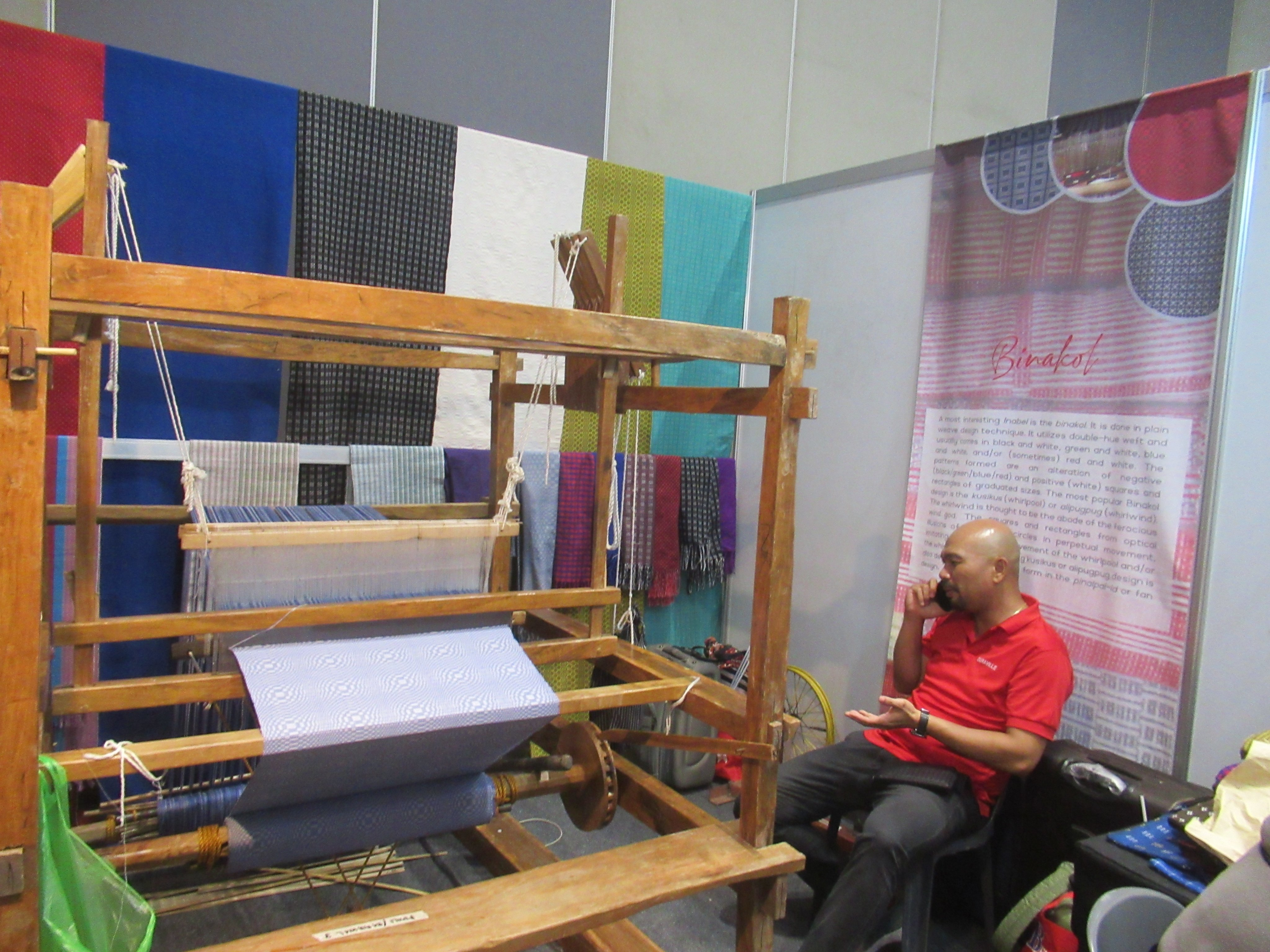
Binakul weaving

The production of inabél begins with preparing kápas (cotton), which involves picking bolls, removing seeds, beating the cotton, and spinning it into yarn. The yarn is then brushed, wound onto spools, and placed on a warping reel before being threaded through the heddle and reed. Once the loom is dressed, the weaving process, or agabel, can begin.

Historically, inabél was used in Ilocano households for items such as hand towels, bed linens, mosquito nets, and other functional textiles. During the galleon trade, inabél was bartered for gold and gained prominence in Philippine culture, even being mentioned in the Ilocano epic Biag ni Lam-ang.

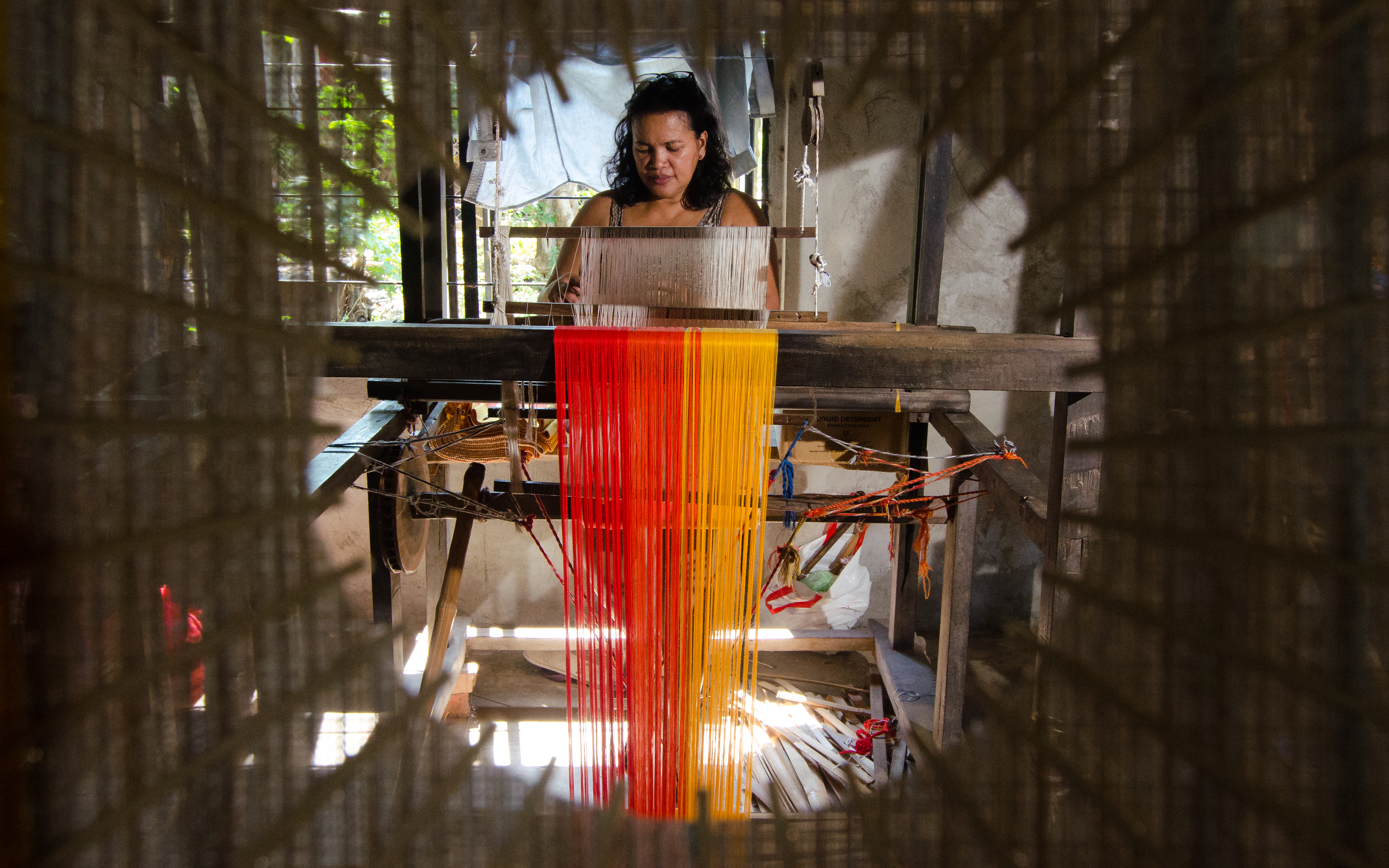
Abel weaver in Vigan City

One of the most notable weavers of inabél is Magdalena Gamayo of Pinili, Ilocos Norte. Born in 1924, she began weaving at the age of 15 and mastered various traditional patterns, including binakol, inuritan (geometric designs), sinan-sábong (floral patterns), and kusikós (spirals).

She received the National Living Treasures Award in 2012 for her skill and dedication to preserving this important aspect of Ilocano heritage.

==== Basketry (lága) ====
Lága – or panaglága, is the Ilocano term for traditional basketry weaving, involving the braiding and interlacing of materials such as palm leaves, bamboo, and rattan to create functional and decorative objects. This craft has been an important part of Ilocano culture for centuries and continues to hold both cultural and practical significance.

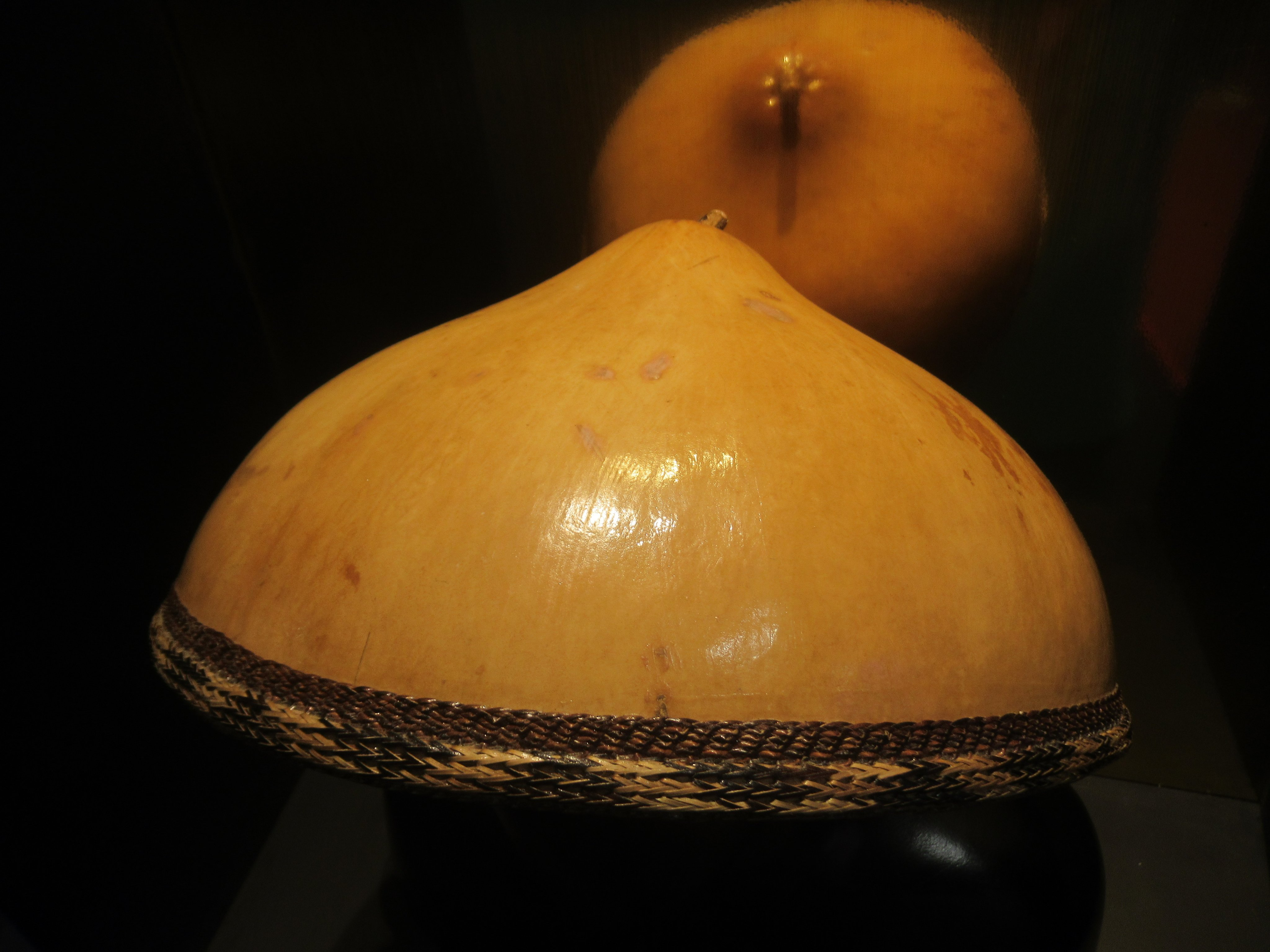
Kattukóng or Tabúngaw hats made by Teofilo Garcia.

Kattukóng, túkong or tabúngaw hat is one of the most iconic pieces of Ilocano headgear. Made from a hollowed-out and dried calabash gourd, the interior of the hat is woven from materials such as anahaw, nipa, bamboo, or rattan. Designed to be practical and weatherproof, the kattukóng protects the wearer from sun and rain. Traditionally worn by farmers and fishermen, it remains an important cultural symbol today.

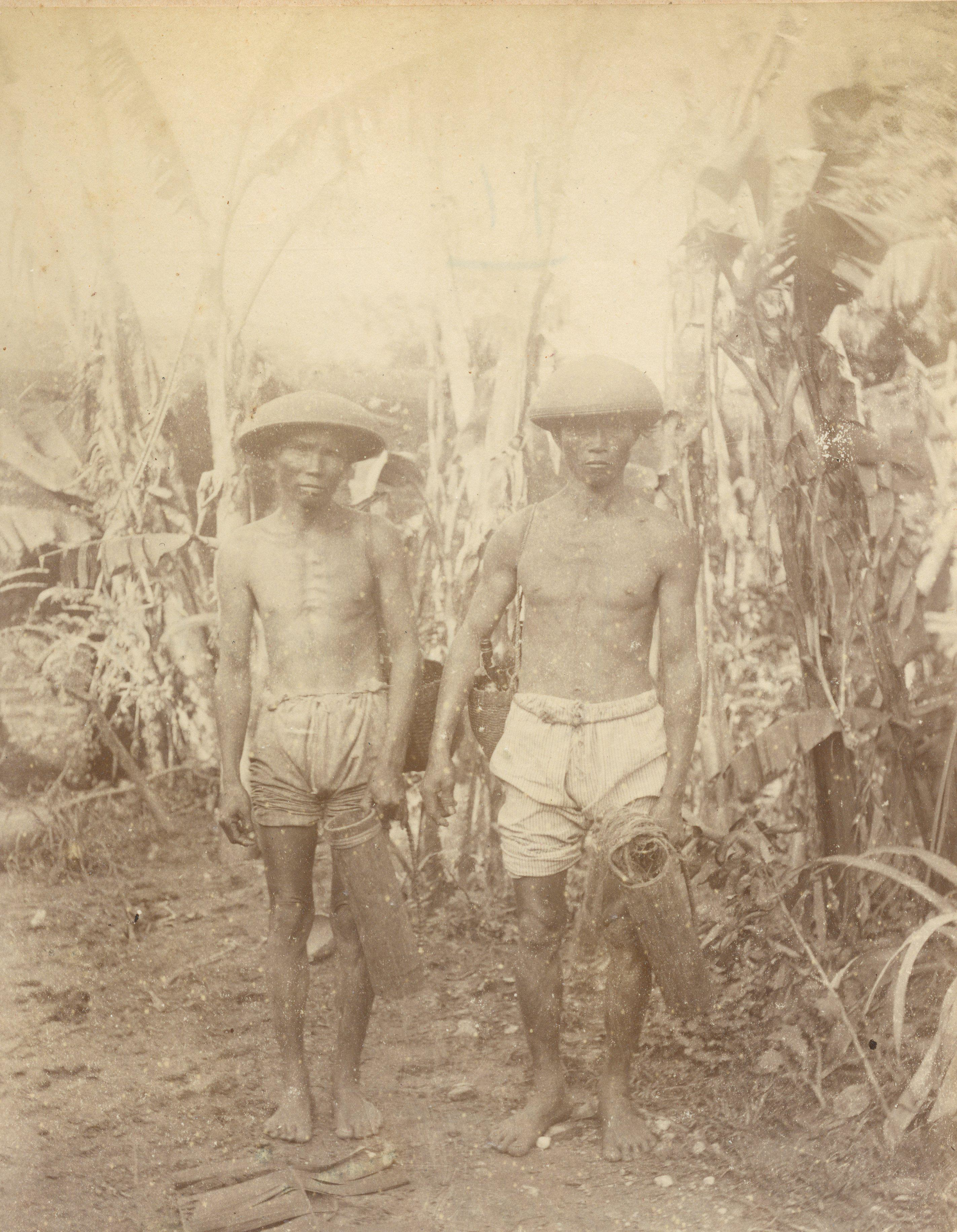
Two Ilocanos wearing Kattukóng or Tabúngaw hats, circa 1885.

Notably, Teofilo Garcia of San Quintin, Abra, has been recognized as a National Living Treasure for his craftsmanship in making these hats, continuing the full process from planting the gourd seeds to varnishing the finished product.

Basketry products play essential roles in daily Ilocano life, particularly in agriculture and fishing. Commonly made from kawáyan (bamboo) and boló (a thinner bamboo species), these include bigaó for winnowing rice and labbá, a vine basket for storing rice, beans, corn, root crops, and fish. Other items include álat, a fish basket with a funnel-shaped cover (serrég); búbo, a bottle-shaped fish trap; barekbék, a small basket for freshwater lobsters; ikamén mats; kallugóng hats; and palaspas, decorative palm weavings. These crafts demonstrate the resourcefulness and creativity of Ilocano artisans, blending utility with artistry.

==== Pottery ====
Damili – is the Ilocano term for molding, and panagdamili or damdamili refers to traditional pottery, one of the oldest Ilocano art forms dating back to pre-colonial times. The craft involves terra-cotta pottery using wooden paddles, with clay kept away from sunlight.

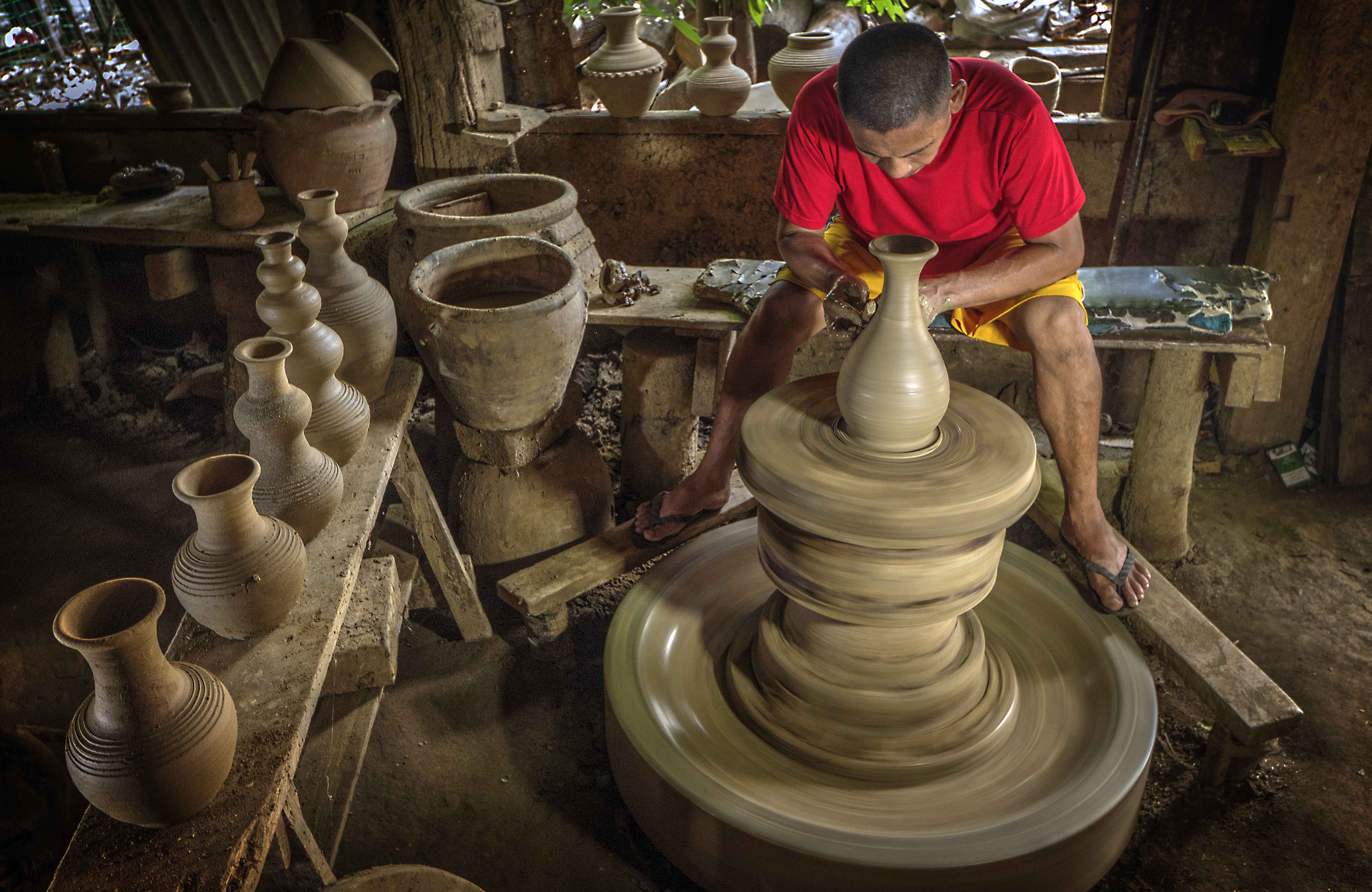
Damdamil in Vigan City

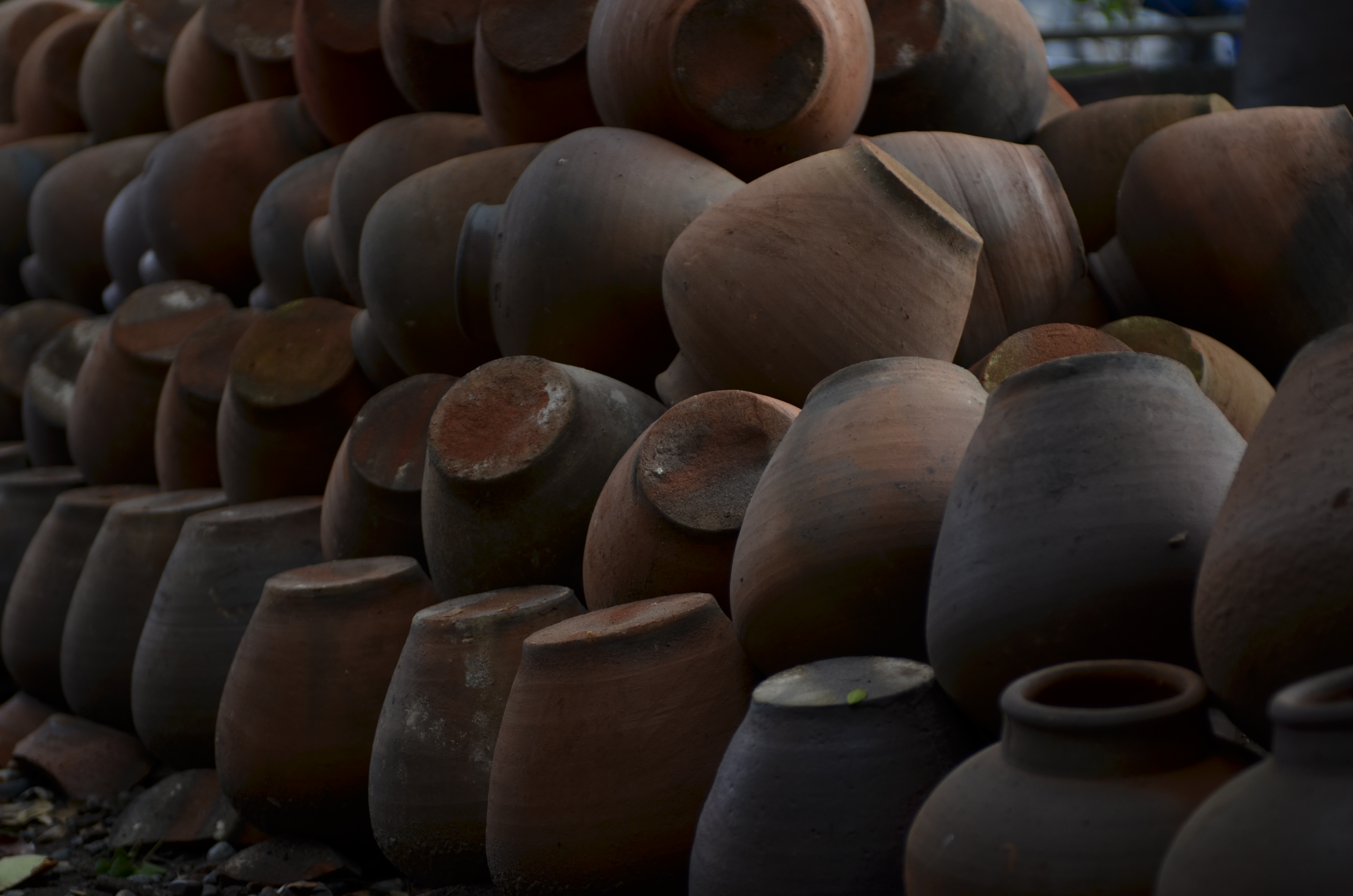
Burnay earthen jar

The process begins by soaking clay overnight and mixing it with sand, then shaping it on a potter's wheel (lupisak) in a stage called agbibir. Pots are air-dried and shaped with wooden paddles such as the banar for the body and the rigay for refining the shoulder and neck against a stone anvil (tuknu), then smoothened with idiid (a shell). Traditional products include dalikán (stoves), banga (cooking pots), dongdóng (larger pots), kelléb (covers), paso (plant pots), burnáy (water vessels), as well as containers for animal feed, well pipes, decorative pottery, and roof tiles.

Burnáy – one of the prominent forms of Ilocano pottery is the burnáy, a traditional craft in Ilocano culture that dates back to pre-colonial times. The burnáy consists of unglazed earthenware jars made from locally sourced clay, particularly in Vigan, Ilocos Sur. The craft, influenced by Chinese traders before European colonization, has been used to store rice, water, salt, brown sugar, and fermented products such as basí (sugarcane wine) and bugguóng (fermented fish), which are believed to improve in flavor when stored in these jars.

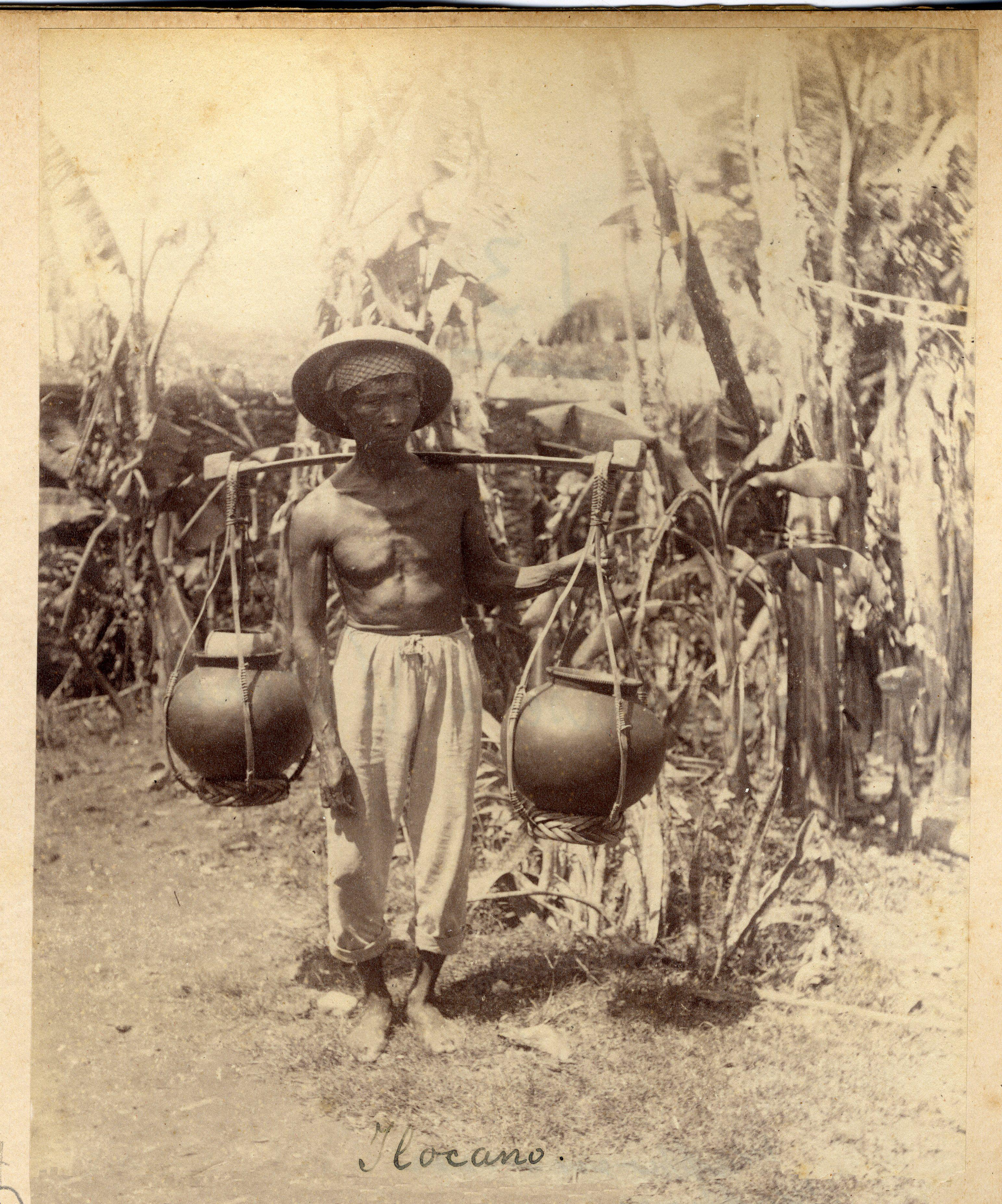
Ilocano carrying two burnay jars, circa 1900.

The production of burnáy jars is labor-intensive and requires great skill. Artisans knead and mold clay by hand, shape the jars on a potter's wheel, and fire them in traditional kilns fueled by rice husks or other natural materials. The jars are renowned for their durability, able to withstand high temperatures and heavy use. Beyond practical purposes, burnáy jars hold cultural significance in Ilocano rituals and celebrations, often used for fermenting foods and beverages, including basí. Their enduring craftsmanship reflects the integral role of burnáy pottery in preserving Ilocano heritage.

==== Winery ====
Ilocanos produce two main types of traditional wine: basí, made from sugarcane, and binubudan (also known as tapuy), made from fermented rice.

Basí – is a native Ilocano wine prepared from fermented sugarcane juice and holds cultural significance in rituals surrounding childbirth, marriage, and death. Production involves boiling sugarcane juice, pouring it into burnáy jars, and flavoring it with ground glutinous rice and tree barks such as samak or lomboy (Java plum). The jars are sealed with banana leaves and left to ferment for several months or years. The resulting wine is pale red with a sweet, tangy flavor. Prolonged fermentation produces suka (vinegar), a staple in Ilocano households. Recipes and fermentation techniques are often passed down through generations.

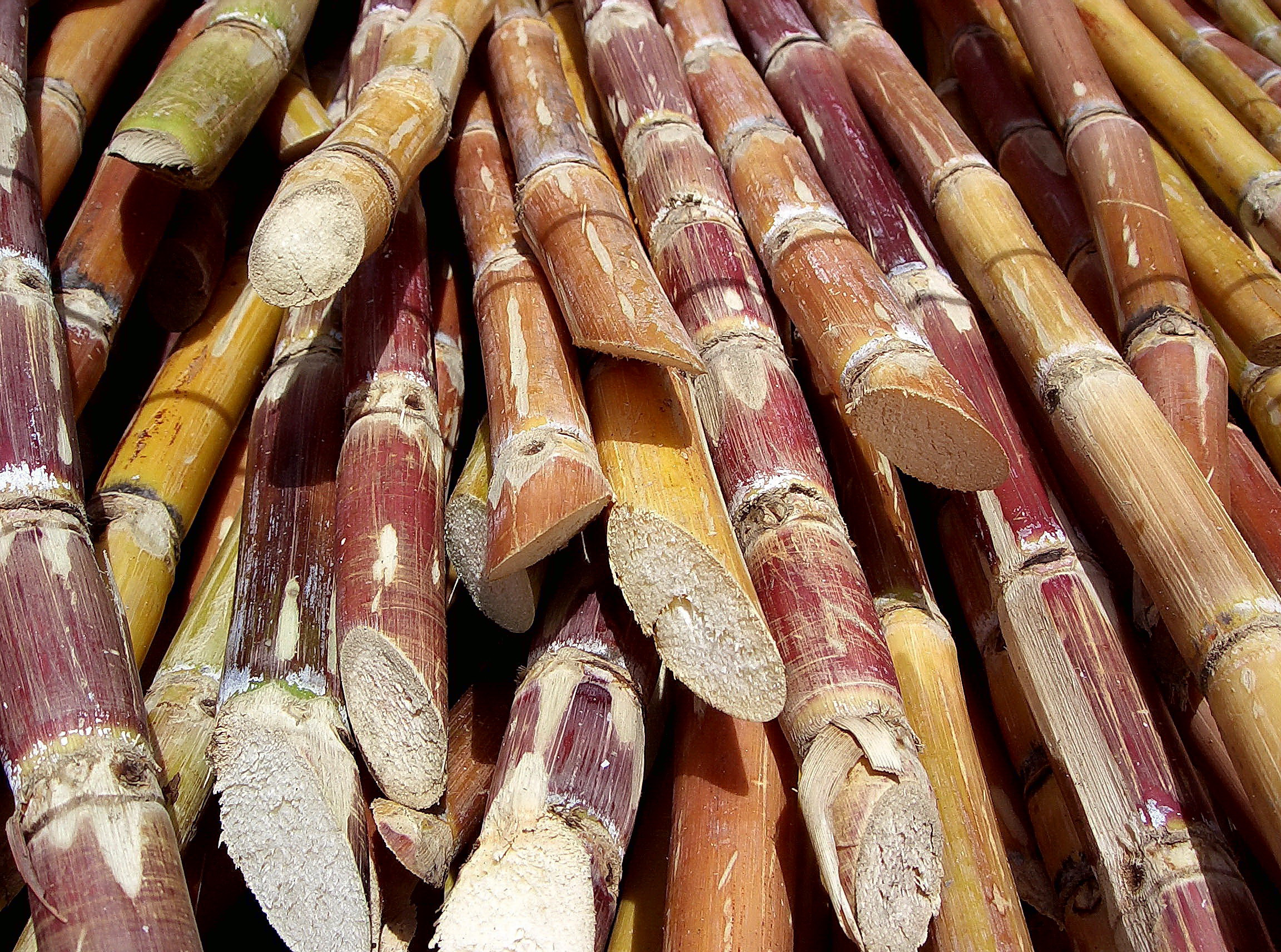
unás (sugarcane) the key ingredient in traditional Basi

Tapuy – or binubudan, is a clear, full-bodied rice wine with moderate sweetness and a strong alcoholic taste. It is made by cooking rice or glutinous rice, mixing it with bubod (rice yeast), and fermenting for 2 to 4 days in a burnáy. During fermentation, the rice releases juice, which can be consumed directly or further fermented into rice wine. This beverage is also common among the Cordilleran peoples, who share similar preparation methods and cultural significance, highlighting the region's shared traditions.

Traditional games – Kukudisi is a traditional Ilocano game that combines strategy, agility, and precision. Commonly played by children in rural areas, it reflects Ilocano resourcefulness, using simple objects such as sticks and lines scratched into the ground. The game begins with the placement of the an-anak, a short stick, on a baseline. The offensive player uses a longer stick, the in-ina, to launch the an-anak into the air, while the defender attempts to catch it before it hits the ground. If the defender fails, the offensive player places the in-ina across the baseline and tries to hit the an-anak as far as possible. Players take turns, competing to hit the stick the greatest distance. Kukudisi develops hand-eye coordination, strength, creativity, and social interaction, fostering community and friendly competition.

Other crafts – Additional traditional Ilocano crafts include:

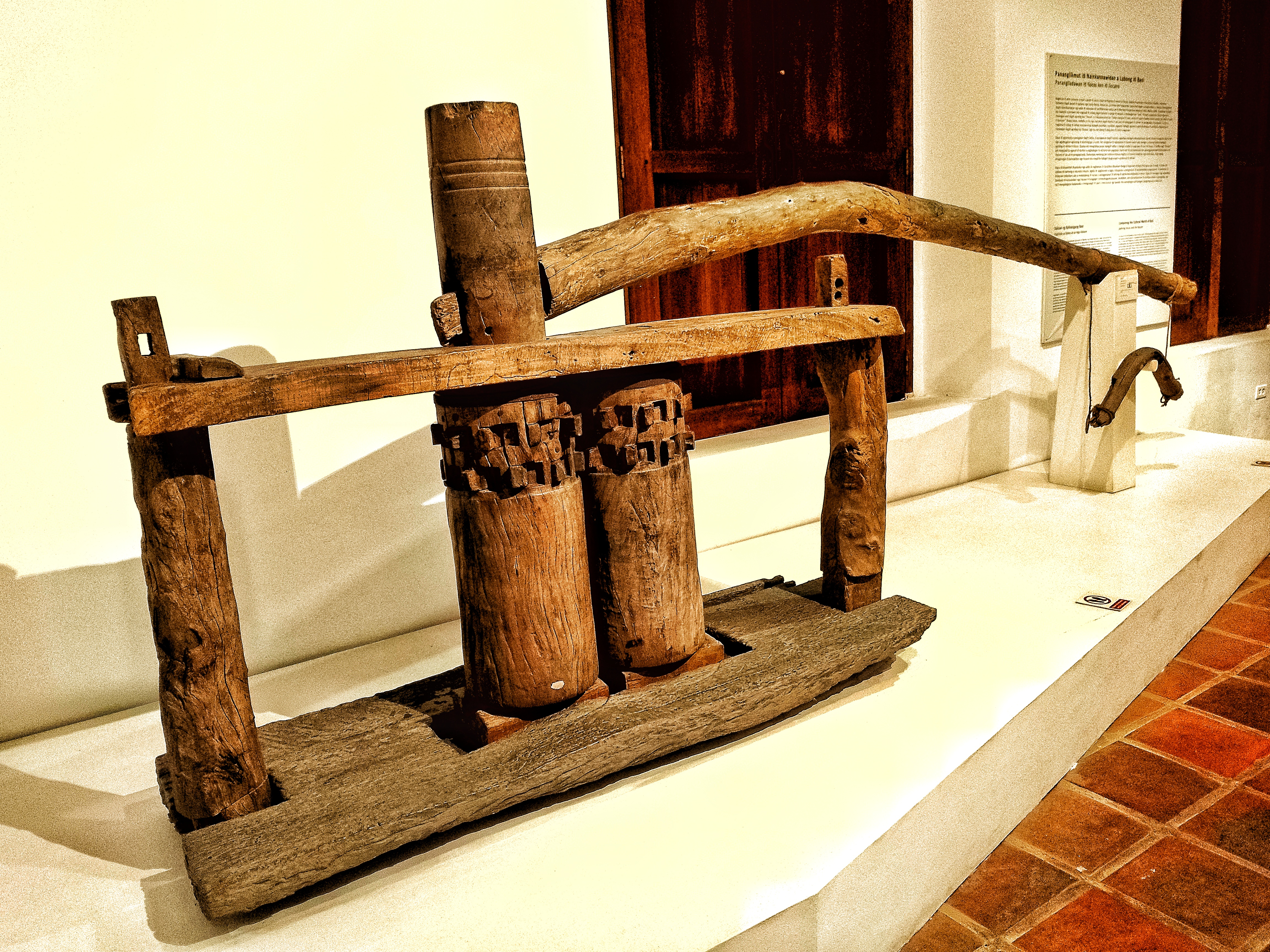
Dadapilan – sugarcane presser, use to extract the sugarcane juice for basi, suka or molasses.

- Dadapilan: a tool used for crushing sugarcane
- Tilar: a native loom
- Dulang: a low table
- Almiris: a mortar
- Maguey products, such as rope and fiber
- Panday: smithing products
- Sag-ut: cotton yarn

=== Music and performing arts ===
==== Music ====
Ilocano music is deeply rooted in the cultural traditions and daily life of the Ilocano people, reflecting various stages of the human life cycle—from birth, love, courtship, and marriage, to death. It emphasizes significant life events and conveys the emotions and experiences associated with them. Traditional forms of Ilocano music include duayya (lullabies), dállot (improvised chants for weddings and courtships), and dung-aw (lamentations for the deceased). These musical expressions provide insight into Ilocano values, history, and social interactions.

Dung-aw is a solemn form of lamentation performed during funerals. It serves as a poetic expression of grief, where the reciter conveys genuine sorrow through wailing and verse. The mournful tones and rhythm of the dung-aw evoke emotions in both performer and audience, fostering a collective sense of loss and remembrance.

Dállot is an improvised, versified poem delivered as a chant or song, often performed during joyful occasions such as weddings, courtships, and betrothals. An example is Dardarepdep ("dream"), similar to the Tagalog harana (serenade), in which love songs are sung to woo a woman. The term dállot originates from the Ilocano words for poem (dániw) and cockfight (pallót), blending intellect and emotion into poetic expressions of love, commitment, and community. Its performance showcases spontaneous poetic artistry and celebrates unity and harmony in social gatherings.

A notable Manlilikha ng Bayan, Adelita Romualdo Bagcal, has dedicated her life to preserving and promoting the Ilocano oral tradition of dallot since childhood. She is the last remaining expert in this art form, focusing on courtship and marriage, and demonstrates her mastery of the Ilocano language and its intricate literary devices through performances at social events.

Duayya is a traditional Ilocano lullaby, sung by mothers to soothe and rock their babies to sleep, reflecting the nurturing and familial aspects of Ilocano culture.

Folk music – Ilocano folk music can be categorized into duwayya, dállot, and dung-áw. These musical forms reflect themes revolving around love, family, nature, and community. The melodies are simple yet powerful, serving as both a form of entertainment and a means of passing down stories, traditions, and moral lessons through generations. Here are some notable Ilocano folk songs:

- Ayat ti Ina (Love of a Mother) – Expresses a mother's unconditional love and care for her child, reinforcing the value of family in Ilocano life.
- Bannatiran – Refers to a native bird from Ilocos, using it as a metaphor for a woman's sought-after brown complexion.
- Dinak Kad Dildilawen (Do Not Criticize Me) – A patriotic song expressing pride in one's identity and origins.
- Duayya ni Ayat (Love's Lullaby) – A man expresses his love for a woman, asking her to stay loyal and not change her heart.
- Dungdungwen Kanto (Lullaby of Love) – A romantic song typically sung at weddings, symbolizing love and care between partners; can also be a lullaby.
- Kasasaad ti Kinabalasang (The Life of a Maiden) – Advises young women to carefully consider their decisions before marriage, highlighting responsibilities and challenges.
- Manang Biday – A song about the traditional courtship of a maiden named Biday, emphasizing Ilocano courtship rituals and modesty.
- Napateg a Bin-i (Cherished Seed) – Compares a woman to a cherished seed, illustrating her value and importance.
- No Duaduaem Pay (If You Still Doubt) – A reassurance song where a lover asks his beloved to trust in the sincerity of his love despite her doubts.
- O Naraniag a Bulan (O Bright Moon) – A fast-paced love song expressing sadness and desperation for enlightenment while contemplating tragic love.
- Osi-osi – A folk song depicting playful yet respectful courtship practices in Ilocano society.
- Pamulinawen – A song about a woman with a "hardened heart" who disregards her lover's pleas, reflecting unrequited love and resilience.
- Siasin ti Agayat Kenka? (Who is in Love with You?) – A song of persistent love where the singer passionately declares devotion and hopes his beloved accepts his feelings.
- Teng-nga ti Rabii (Midnight) – A lover's song about being awakened by the image and voice of his beloved at midnight, emphasizing longing and desire.
- Ti Ayat ti Maysa a Ubing (The Love of a Child) – Portrays the pure, unbiased, and unconditional love of a child, highlighting innocence and sincerity.

==== Dance ====
Ilocano dances are performed during rituals, celebrations, and social gatherings. They draw influences from Cordilleran (Igorot), Spanish, and American dance movements.

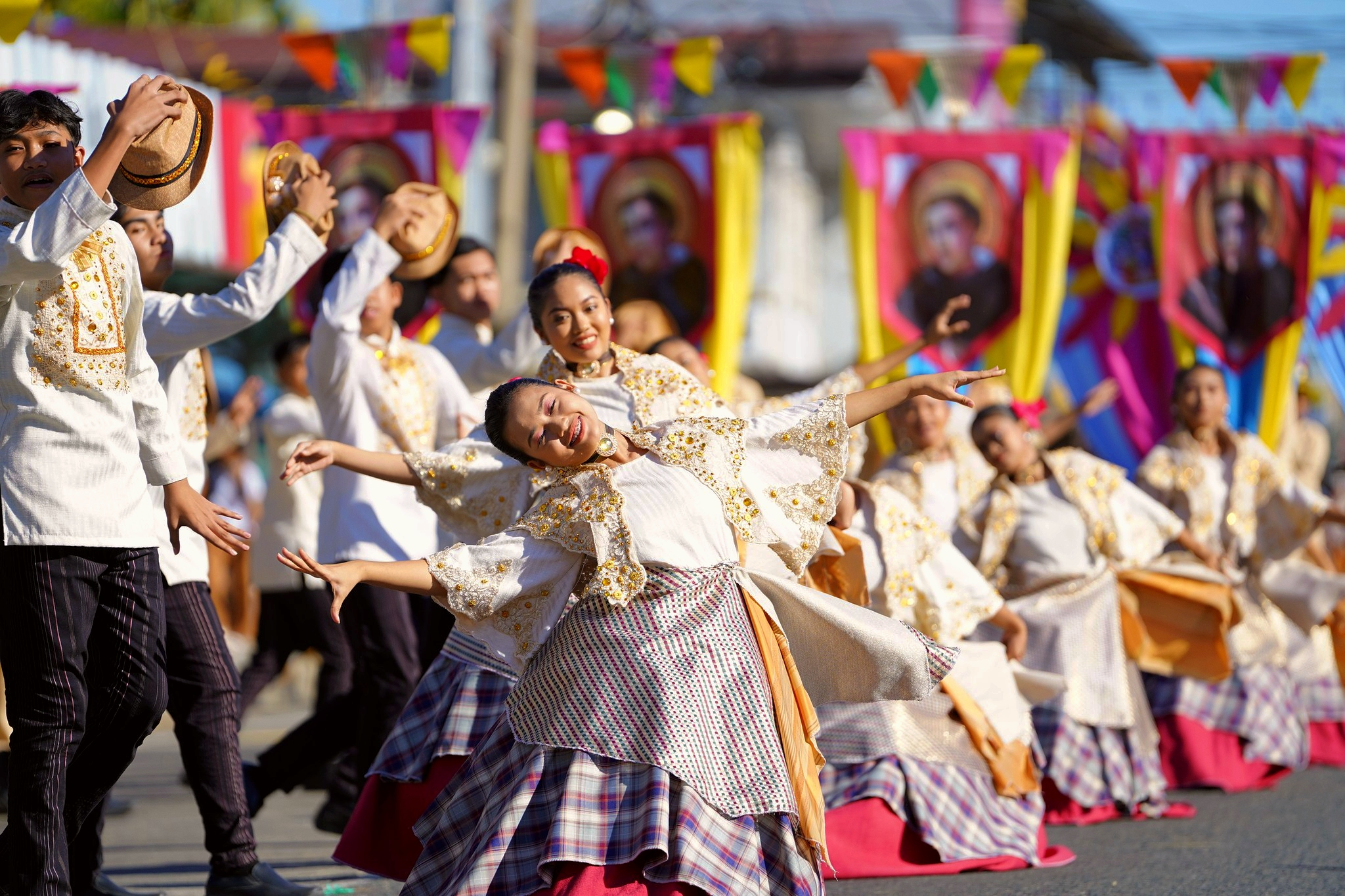
Panagyaman dancers showcasing Ilocano steps in Balaoan, La Union.

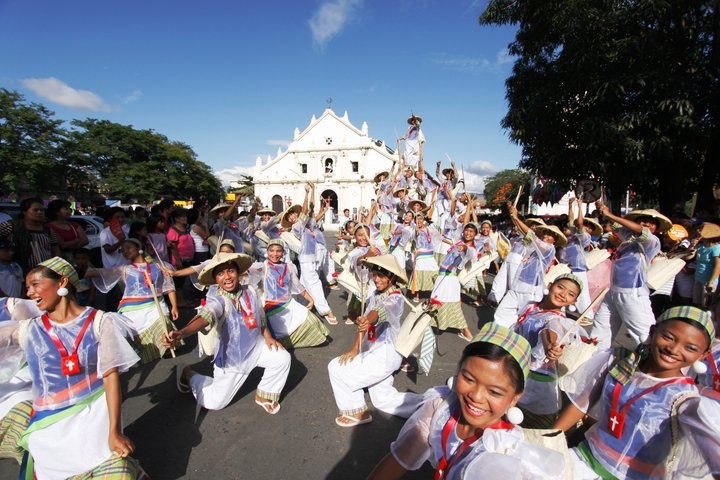
Binatbatan dancer during city fiesta at Vigan, Ilocos Sur

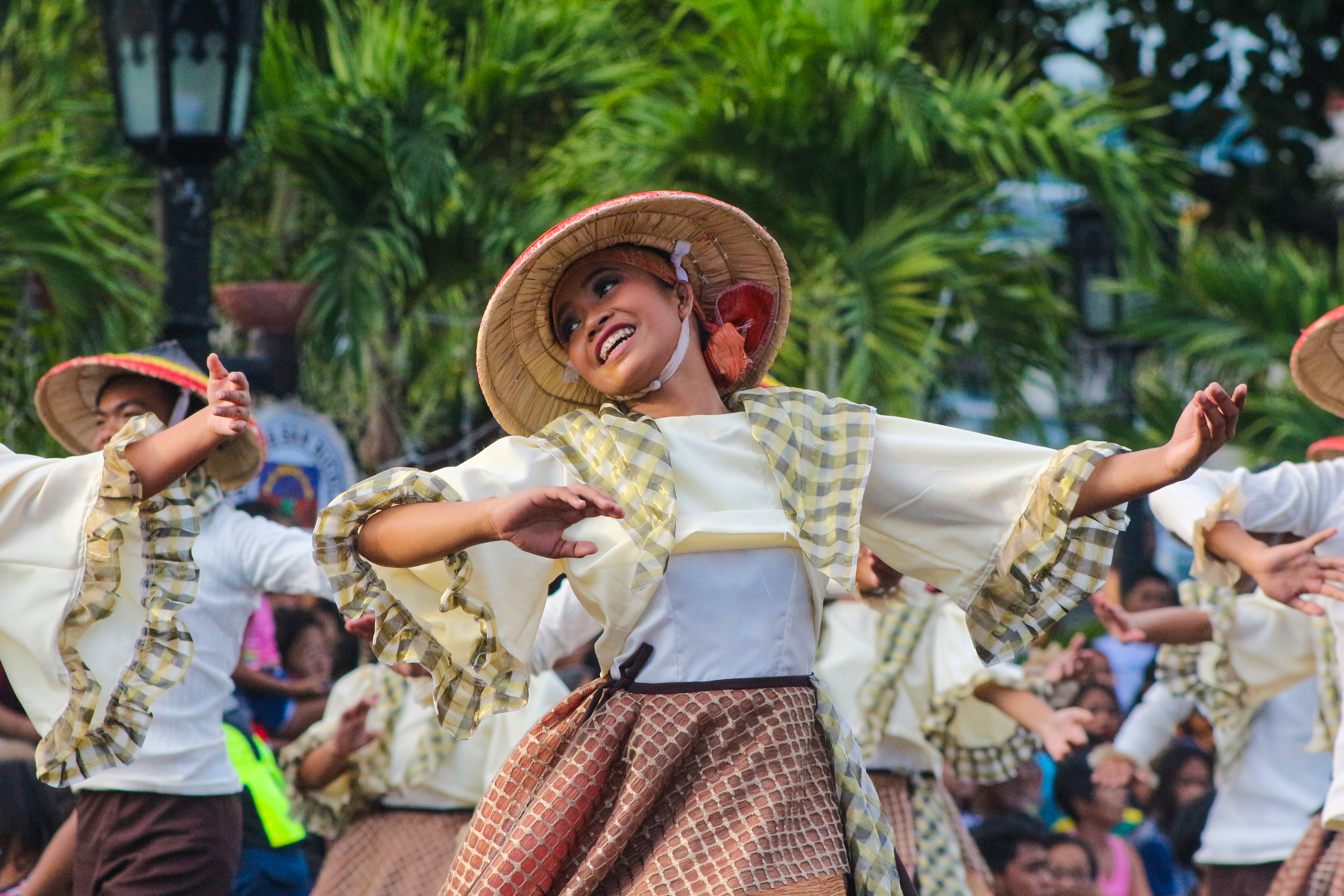
Damili dancer displaying Ilocano steps in San Nicolas, Ilocos Norte.

Kumintang, or gumintang a traditional dance step associated with Ilocano values, especially the idea of saving for the future. While variations of the kumintang exist in other parts of the Philippines, the Ilocano version involves inward arm movements and half-closed hands. This reflects the practical, forward-thinking nature of the Ilocano people.

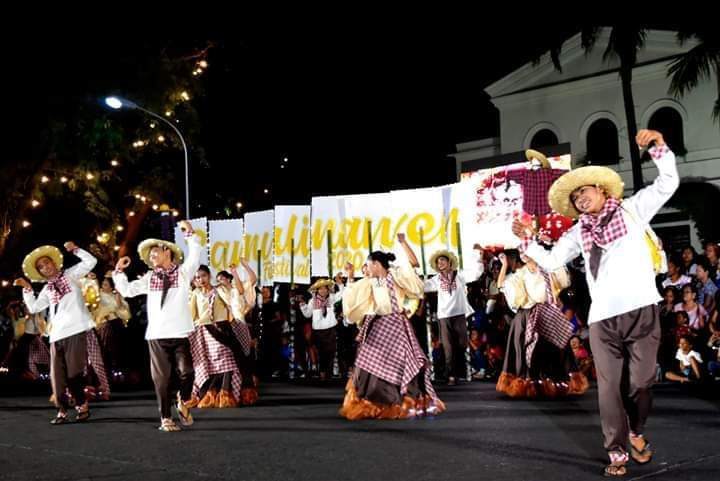
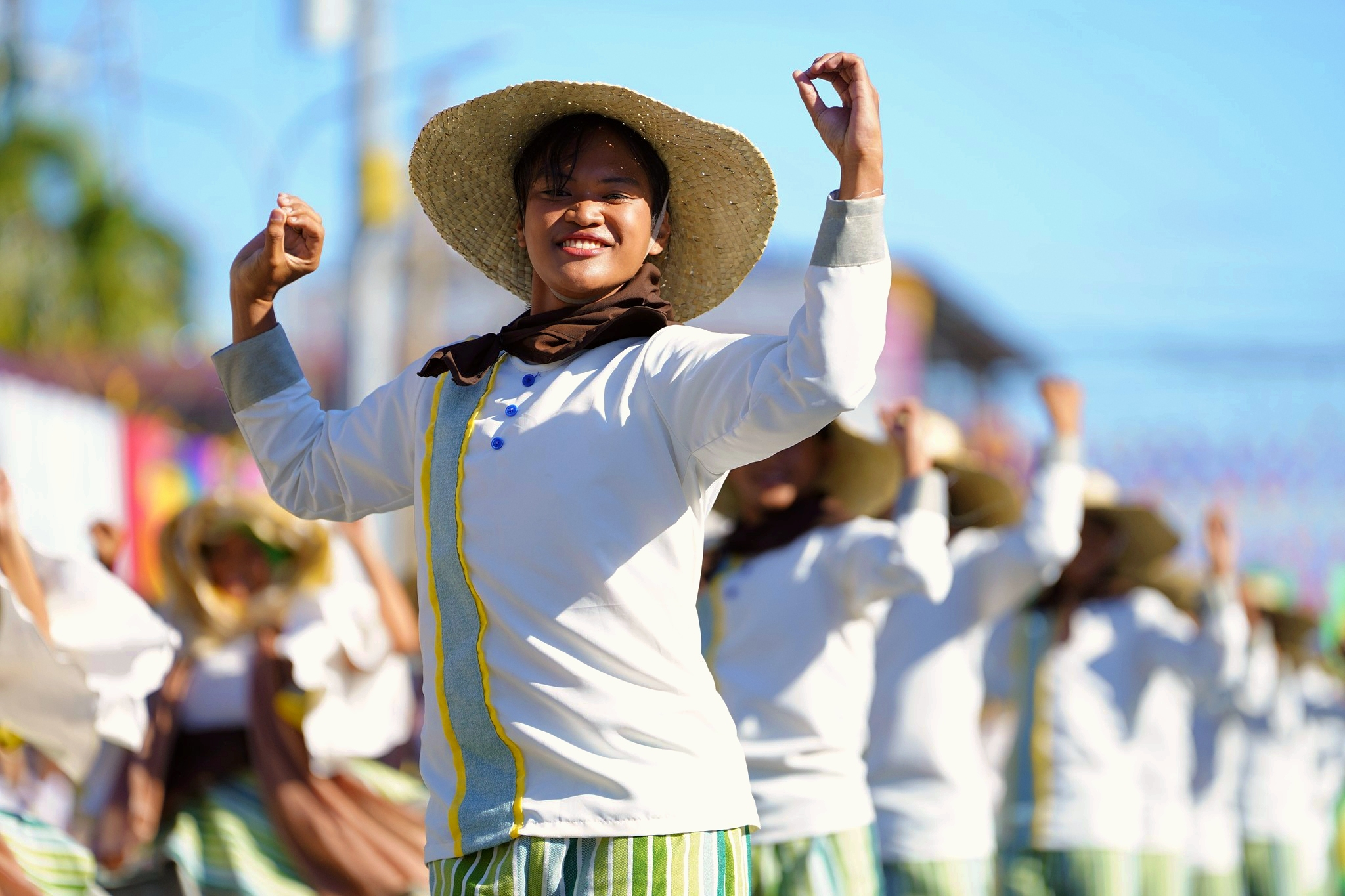
Folk dancers highlighting the Ilocano kumintang dance step

Korriti, a dance step showcases the energetic and hardworking spirit of the Ilocanos. It symbolizes the fast and lively movements needed to work in the fields or search for opportunities. The quick footwork represents their determination and resilience in earning a living.

Sagamantika, a gentle, flowing dance step that involves moving forward and backward. It symbolizes an important Ilocano belief: no matter where you go, you will always return to your roots. This step reflects the importance of home and the lasting connection to where one was born and raised.

Folk dance – Ilocano folk dances vary across the region, with dances often being tied to specific locations and communities. They are performed for a variety of occasions, including courtship, community events, and rituals.

- Agabel – Weaving dance.
- Agdamdamili – Traditional pot dance.
- Ba-Ingles – A dance from Cabugao, brought by early English tradesmen.
- Binatbatan – Depicts cotton-beating to separate fibers.
- Binigan-bigat – Courtship dance where a boy pleads for a girl's love.
- Cariada ti Mannalon – A folk dance from San Manuel, Isabela depicts the daily life of a farmers.
- Chotis Dingreña – Social dance performed as an intermission.
- Dinaklisan – Fishing dance showing fisherfolk's labor.
- Habanera – Traditional Spanish-influenced dance.
- Ilocana a Nasudi – Symbolizes the purity and modesty of Ilocana women.
- Innalisen – Traditional Ilocano dance.
- Jota Aragoneza – Ilocano Jota dance from Paoay, Ilocos Norte.
- Jota Moncadeña – Ilocano Jota dance from Moncada, Tarlac.
- Kinnalogong – Traditional Ilocano dance.
- Kinoton – Humorous dance mimicking someone bitten by ants.
- Kutsara Pasuquiña – Festive party dance.
- Pandanggo Laoagueña – Lively Ilocano courtship dance.
- Rabong – Celebrates bamboo shoots, a delicacy.
- Sabunganay – Represents a young girl not yet ready for courtship.
- Saimita – Traditional Ilocano dance.
- Sakuting – Theatrical dance from Abra province.
- Sileledda-ang – Courtship dance expressing deep affection.
- Surtido Banna (Espiritu) – Ilocano waltz variation.
- Surtido Norte – Mix of Ilocano dance steps symbolizing thriftiness.
- Vintareña – Dance for social events like weddings and baptisms.

==== Drama ====
Ilocano drama, or theater, includes the genres of zarzuela and comedia (or moro-moro), which have been performed for generations. Other local performances include the dállot, a sung exchange about love between a man and a woman, and búcanégan, a tribute performance honoring someone.

Zarzuelas, a type of musical theater that blends singing, dancing, and spoken dialogue. Introduced from Spain in the 19th century, it quickly became popular in the Ilocos region. Often centered on love stories with "boy-meets-girl" themes, zarzuela offers a mix of melodrama, comedy, and romance that appeals to audiences. One well-known Ilocano zarzuela, Tres Patrimoño, tells the life stories of three important people from Vigan, Diego and Gabriela Silang, Leona Florentino, and Padre Burgos, who all played significant roles in Philippine history.

Moro-Moro, also known as comedia, moro moro a theatrical form that gained popularity in the 19th century through Marcelino Crisólogo, particularly during fiestas in Vigan. It centers on the conflicts between Christians and Muslims, in contrast to zarzuela, which addresses social issues through music and dance. Moro-moro incorporates traditional elements such as battle scenes and religious themes, and it places a strong emphasis on costumes and elaborate staging to convey its historical narratives.

=== Cuisine ===
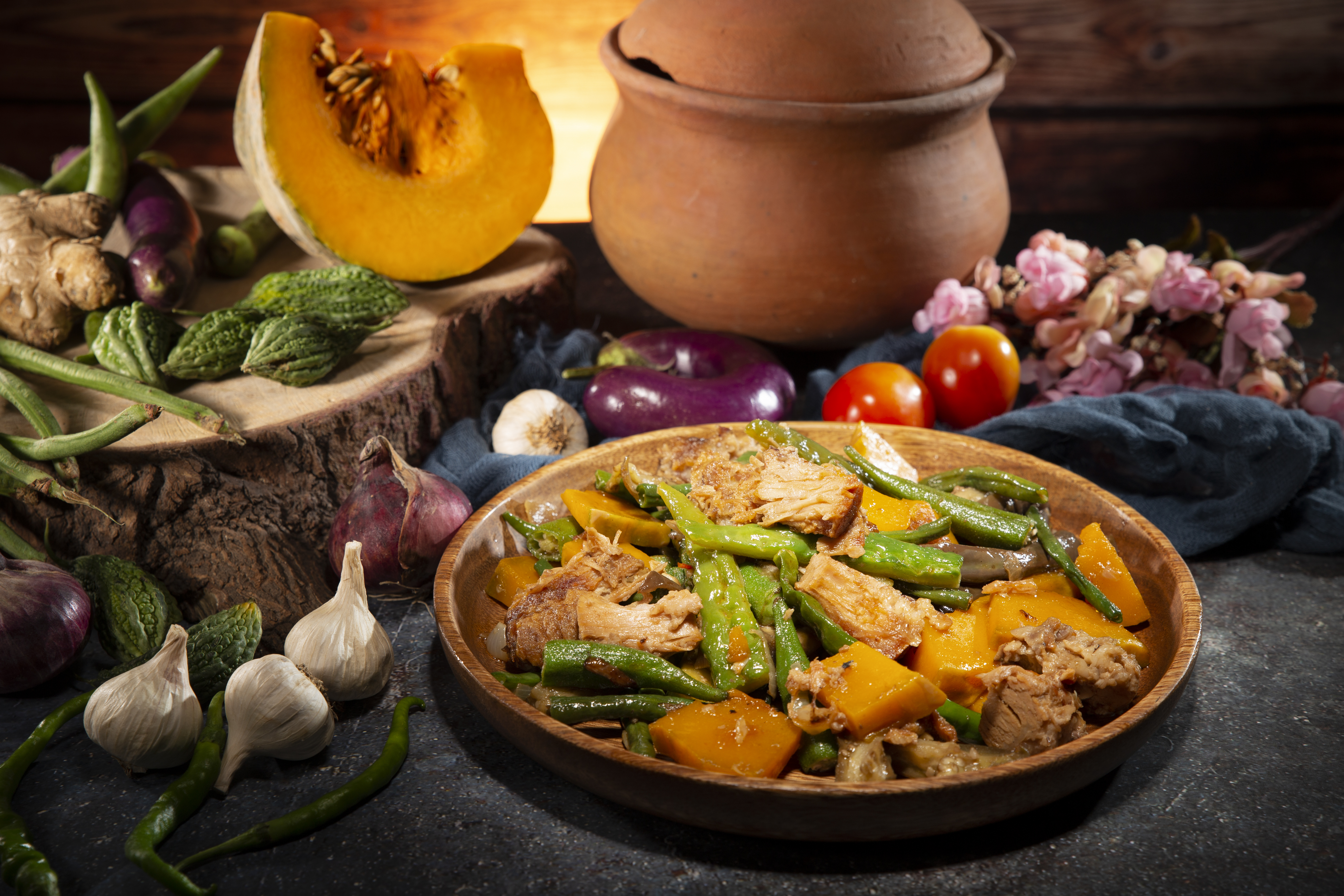
Pinakbet, one of the staples of the Ilocano diet

Ilocano cuisine reflects the resourcefulness and traditions of the Ilocano people, shaped by their coastal, agricultural, and mountainous homeland. Influenced by Chinese, Spanish, and American cuisines, it is defined by a love for bugguóng (anchovy paste), which shapes the Ilocano palate, and a strong emphasis on naténg (vegetables), earning them the nickname "weed-eaters" for their preference for wild and cultivated greens such as salúyot, sabidukong, rabóng and alukón (broussonetia luzonica).

==== Dishes ====
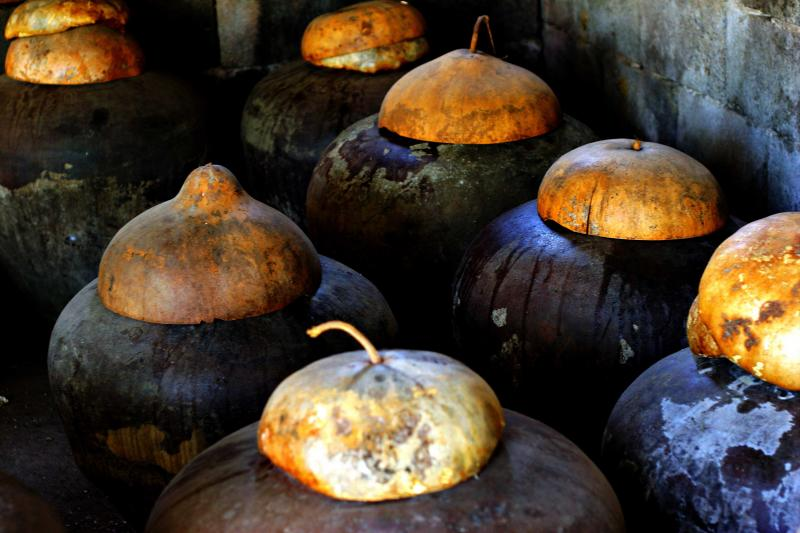
Bugguóng munamon (fermented anchovies) in burnáy

Ilocano dishes distinguish themselves from those of other ethnolinguistic groups in the Philippines through their significant use of a variety of vegetables and edible flora. Central to the Ilocano diet are dinengdeng or inabraw, which refers to boiled vegetables and legumes, often accompanied by freshwater fish, pork, and salt, and seasoned with bugguóng. The distinct flavors of Ilocano cuisine are primarily derived from bugguóng, which defines the Ilocano palate.

Bugguóng is a common flavoring agent in many Ilocano dishes, from dinengdeng (a vegetable soup) to pinakbet (a mixed vegetable dish), as well as in the popular Ilocano salsa known as KBL (kamátis-bugguóng-lasoná). Prominent ingredients in Ilocano cuisine include sukáng Iloko (sugarcane vinegar), which is used in inartém or pickling various vegetables and seasonal fruits such as balayang (Musa errans), santol, buatsina, manga, sili, bawang, and others.

The Ilocano belief that food with a bitter taste is both better and medicinal further influences their culinary preferences. This cultural perspective fosters an appreciation for bitter flavors, leading to the enjoyment of dishes featuring pariá (bitter melon) and pinapaítan, a stew made from cow or goat innards that includes bile.

In Ilocano culture, meat holds significant importance, particularly during festive occasions. Meat dishes are often associated with celebrations such as weddings, fiestas, and family reunions, symbolizing abundance and communal unity. Some other notable Ilocano dishes include:

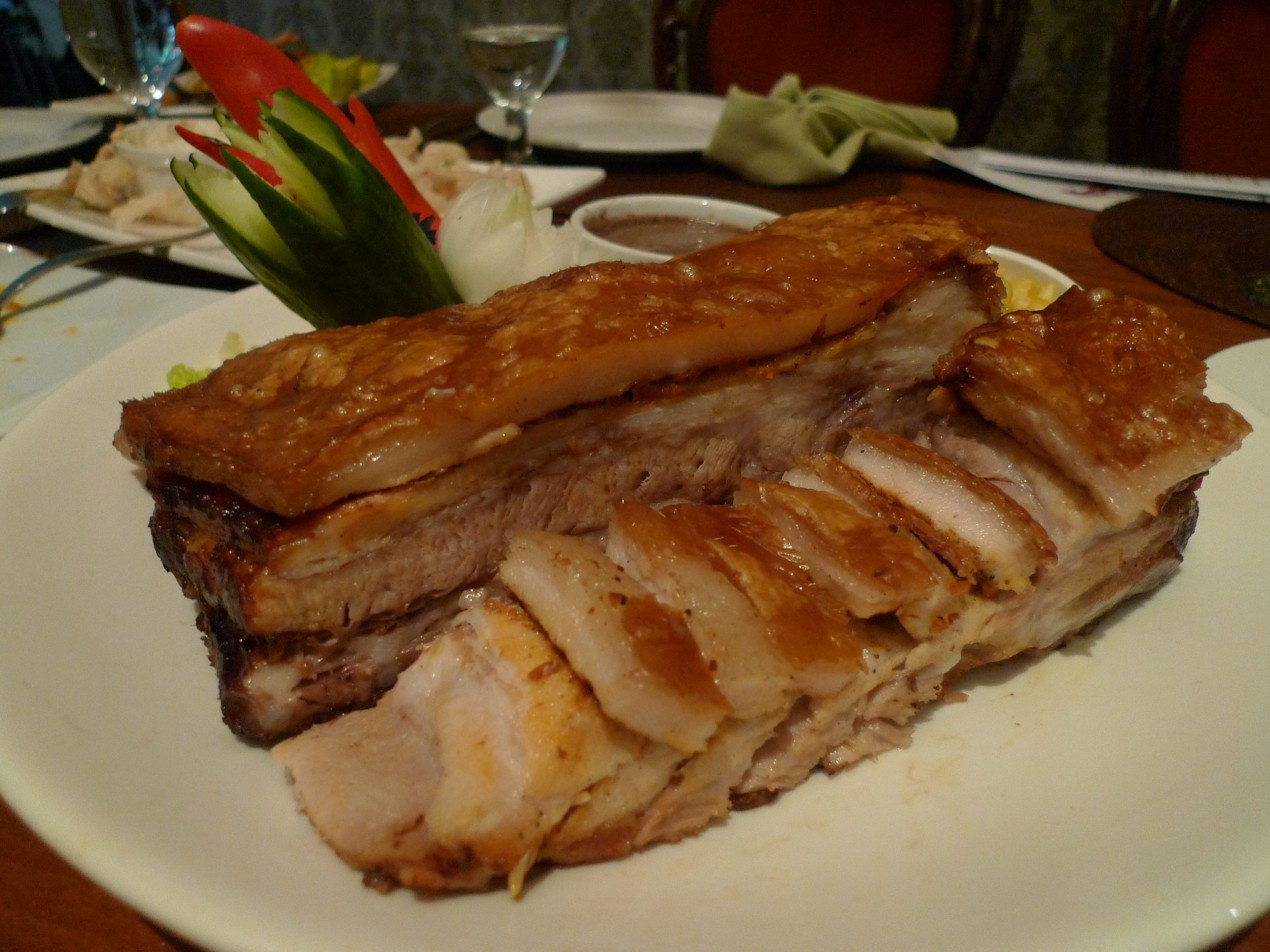
- Bagnet
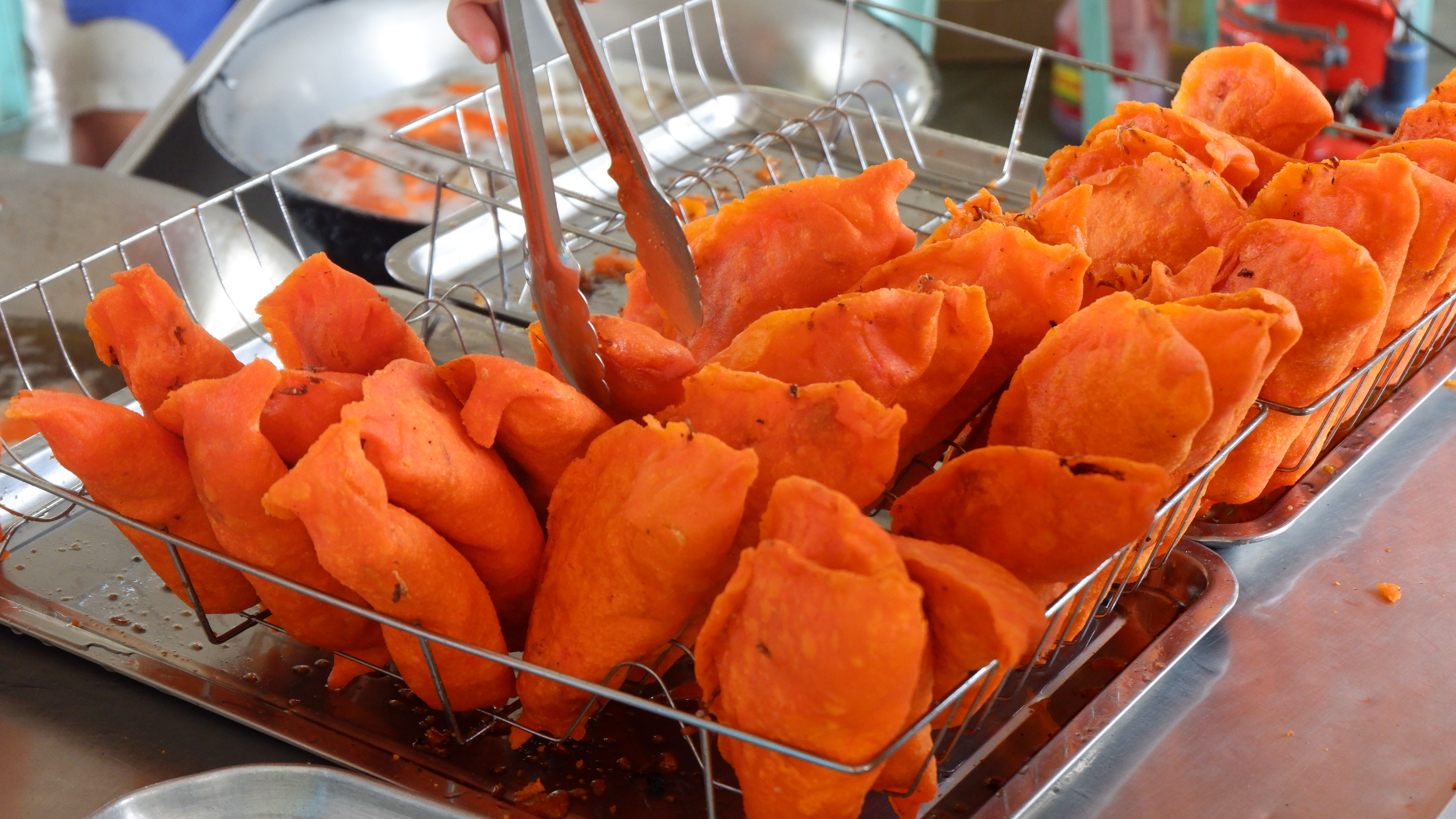
  Ilocos Empanada
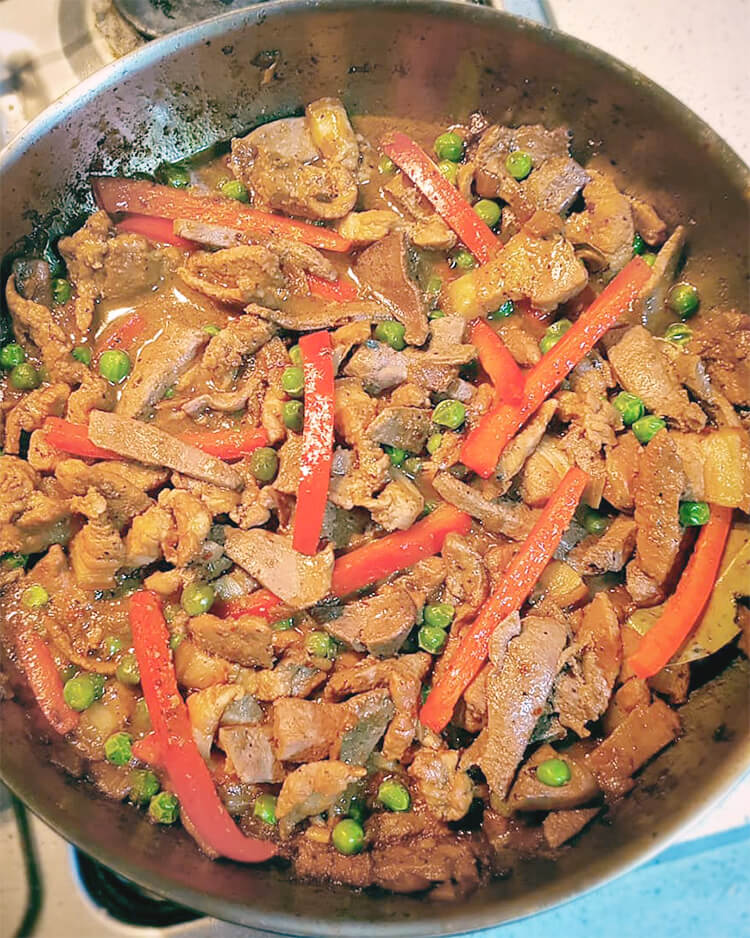
  Igado
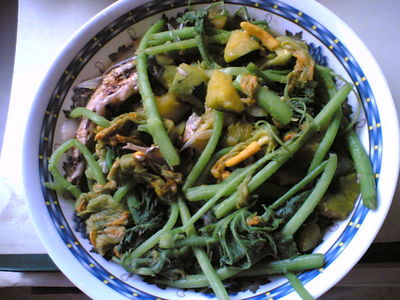
  Dinengdeng
  Pinakbet: Made with a variety of mixed vegetables flavored with bugguóng.
- Dinengdeng (Inabraw): A bugguóng soup-based dish with fewer vegetables.
- Buridibod: A simple mix of moringa fruit, sweet potato, bugguóng, and fried/grilled fish.
- Dinakdakan: A dish made from grilled parts of a pig's head combined with onions, vinegar, chili and pig's brain.
- Insarabasab: Consisting of chopped flame-grilled pork mixed with chilis and sukang Iloko.
- Igado: Pork and liver stew cooked in vinegar and spices.
- Pinapaitan: Stew composed of cow or goat innards, steak pieces, and bile
- Sinanglao: With beef and beef offal flavoured with kamias, ginger and bile, nearly similar to pinapaitan.
- Bagnet: Pork belly boiled and deep fried until crispy.
- Ilocos empanada: Deep-fried, orange-tinged glutinous rice flour stuffed with longganisa, egg, green papaya or sayote, and mung beans.
- Longganisa: A savory, garlicky, and slightly sour sausage made from pork, garlic and seasonings.
- Kinilnat: A salad made with a variety of blanched vegetables such as leafy greens, shoots, blossoms, immature fruits, or other vegetable parts and dressed with bugguóng, calamansi, tomato, and lasona.
- Kilawen: A raw meat or seafood dish marinated in sukang Iloko and citrus juices with onion or with ginger.
- Poqui Poqui: Made from grilled eggplant, sautéed with bugguóng, onion, tomato, and scrambled egg.
- Dinardaraan: A dry pork blood stew.
- Lauya: Meat soup like tinola, but made with pork or beef knuckles instead of chicken.

Another essential vegetable ingredient in Ilocano cuisine is marúnggáy (moringa). The leaves are commonly used as a condiment in the meat soup lauya, while the fruit pods and flower can be added to buridibod or dinengdeng. Most households in Ilocos grow marúnggáy in their backyards and often share it with neighbors, highlighting its importance in the community. It is particularly popular among Ilocanos in Hawaii. Ilocano people have gained recognition as the first ethnic group in the Philippines to consume the larvae and eggs of abuós (weaver ants), abal-abál (june beetle) and araráwan (crickets). This practice has since been adopted by other ethnic groups in northern Luzon, showcasing the Ilocanos' connection to their environment and the innovative ways they utilize local resources.

==== Desserts ====
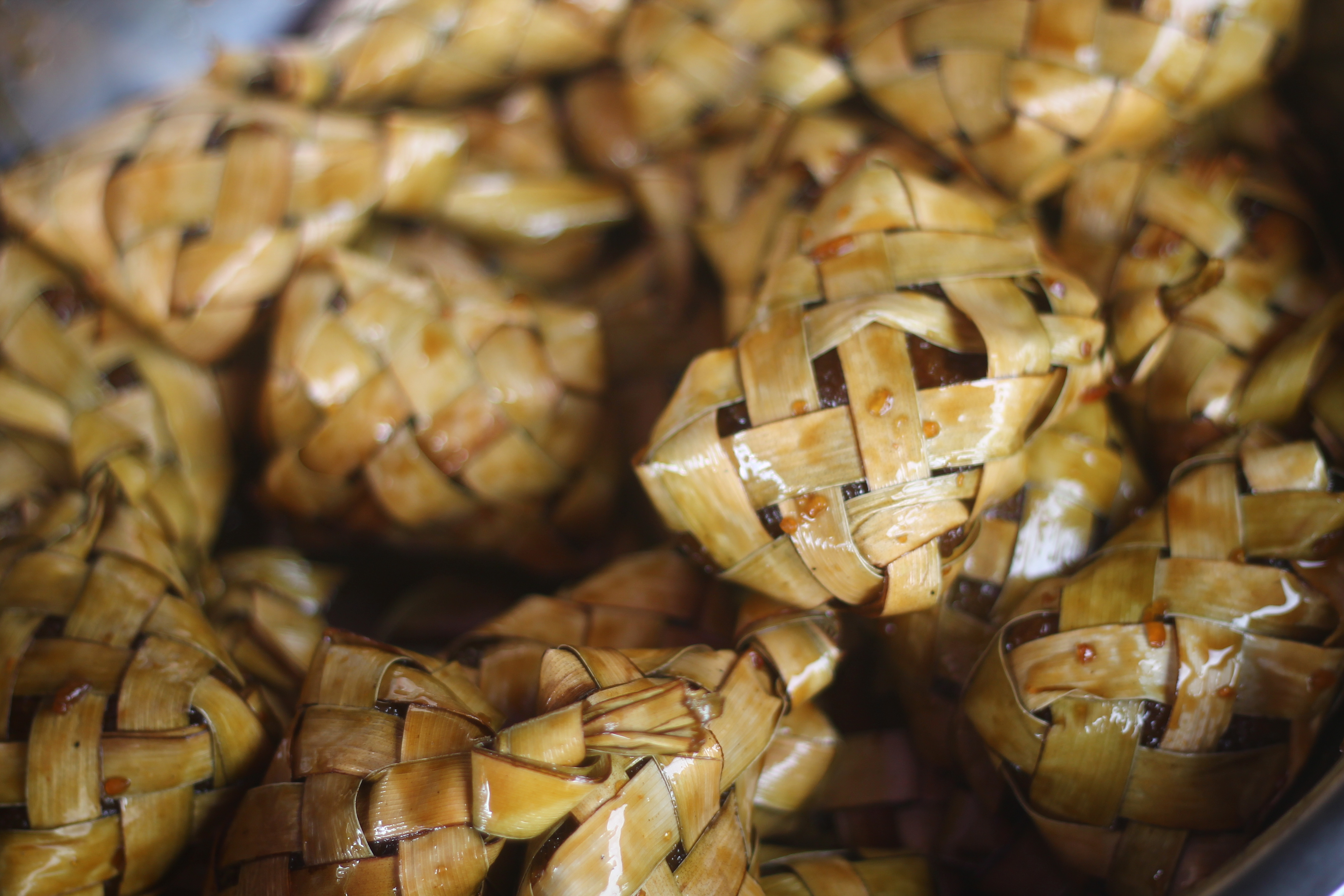
Patupat (La Union, Pangasinan, & Cagayan), or Sinambong (Ilocos Sur & Ilocos Norte)

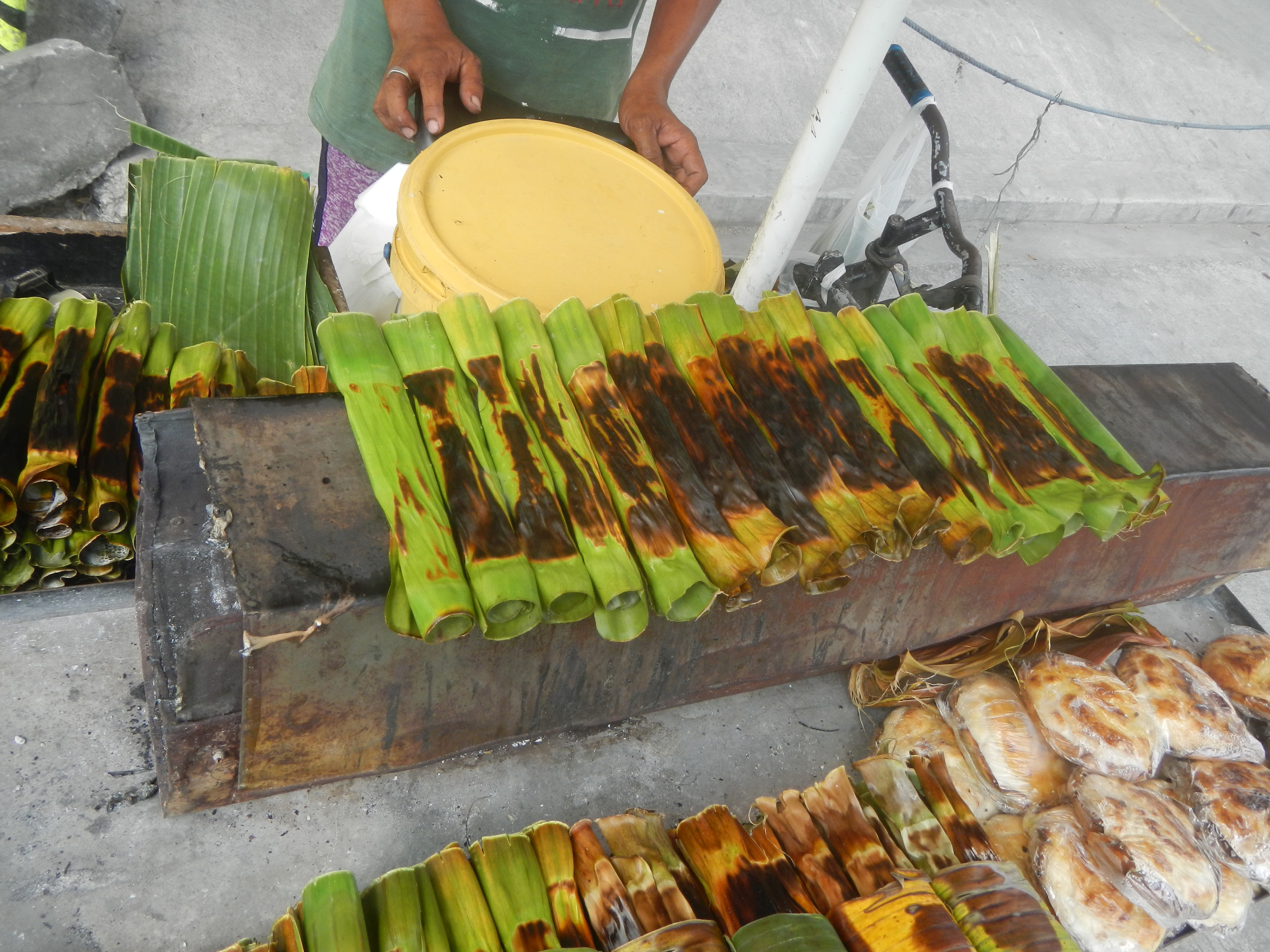
Tupig also known as intemtem or kankanen

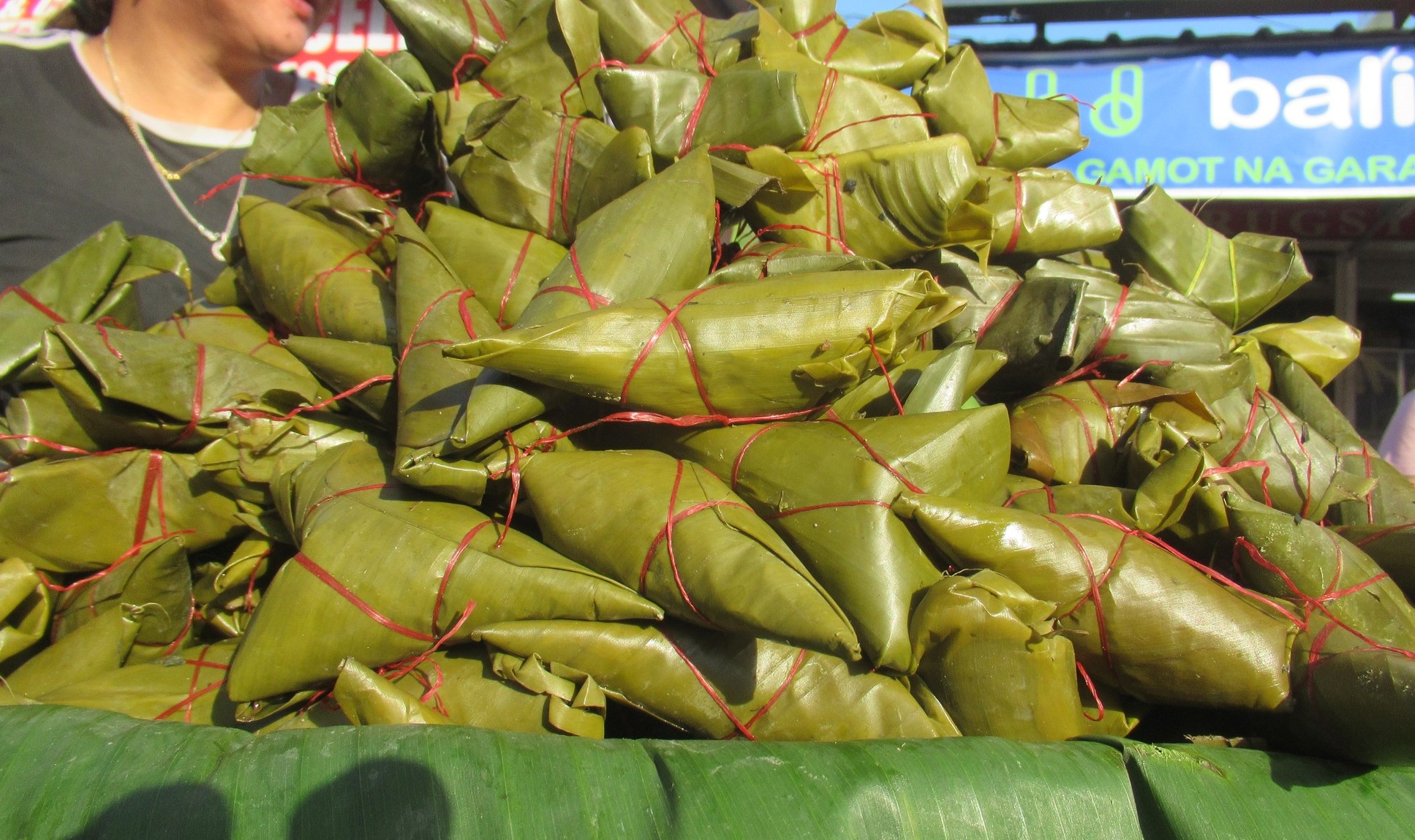
Suman (La Union) or Patopat (Ilocos Sur & Ilocos Norte)

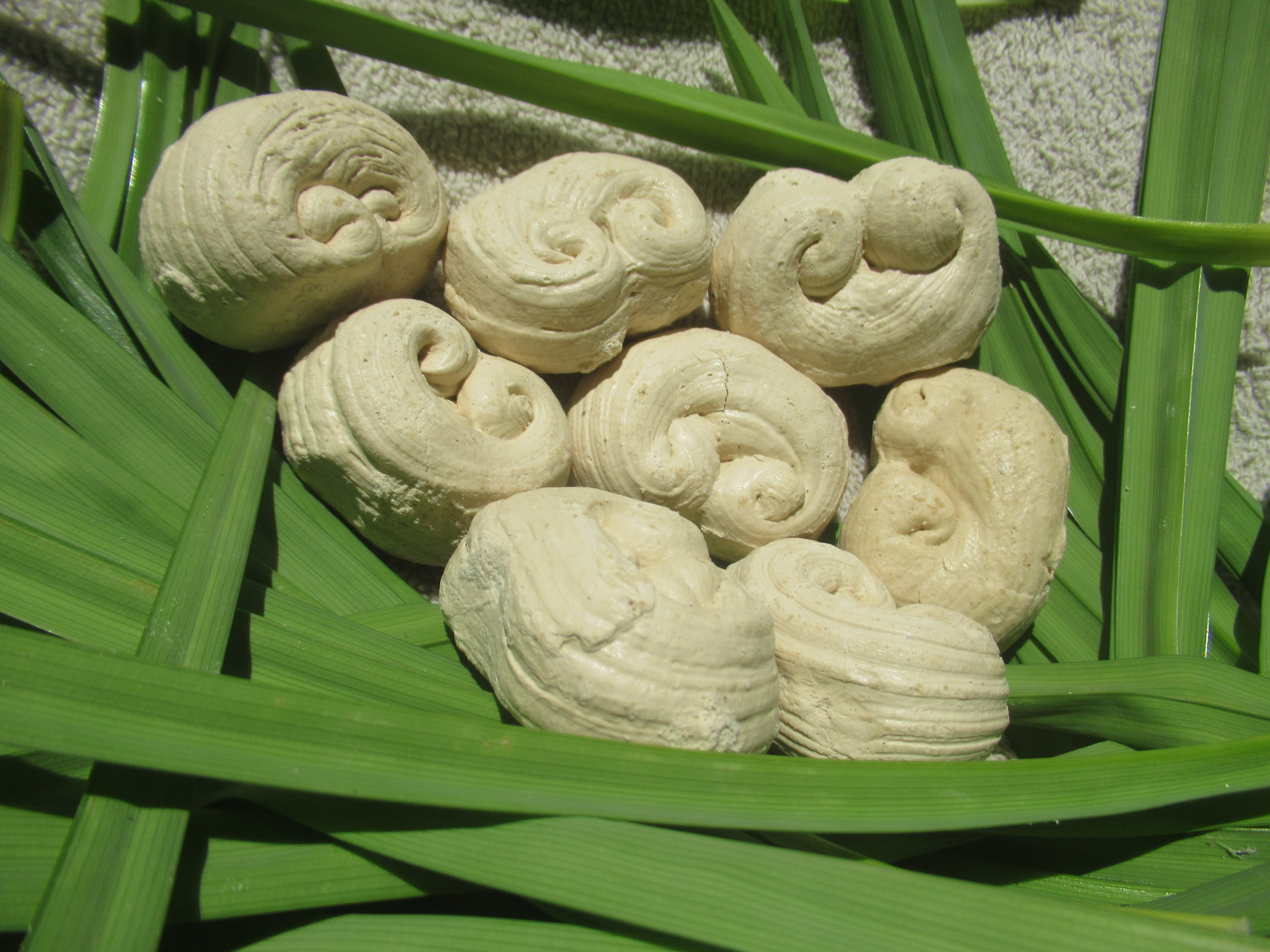
Balikucha, a pulled sugar candy made from sugarcane

Ilocano desserts, often based on glutinous rice, coconut, sinacob, root crops and sugarcane juice, blend local ingredients and colonial influences. Kankanen, a dense and chewy sticky rice cake, is a beloved treat among Ilocanos. Some other notable Ilocano desserts include:

- Tupig: An all-time favorite rice cake snack wrapped in banana leaves, made from ground glutinous rice with buko strips, coconut milk, sugar, and sesame seeds, cooked over a live charcoal grill.
- Tinubong: The more traditional version of tupig, cooked in bamboo tubes, making it moister, stickier, and sweeter.
- Patupat: Made from woven buri leaves, containing sticky rice cooked in sugarcane juice, particularly popular during summer when sugarcane is harvested.
- Dudol: Made from rice flour, coconut milk, sugarcane juice, and anise, serving as a perfect snack.
- Balikutsa: A very sweet, candy-like delicacy made from sugarcane molasses stretched and curled into shape.
- Inkiwar: A sweet rice cake made from glutinous rice with a rich amount of coconut milk.
- Bucayo: Sweetened coconut strips, traditionally made by simmering young, gelatinous coconut in water and sinuklob.
- Baduya: A pan-fried snack made with saba bananas, glutinous rice flour, coconut milk, sugar, and grated coconut.
- Busi: Caramelized popped rice made from puffed rice and molasses.
- Dudumen: Made with burned young glutinous rice, cooked with coconut milk and panutsa.
- Linapet: A sticky rice bread traditionally filled with sweetened ground peanuts and wrapped in banana leaves.
- Balisongsong: Made from sticky rice or rice flour and coconut milk, wrapped banana leaves in a triangular shape, and boiled or steamed until cooked.
- Lubi-Lubi (Lunubian): Made of boiled and mashed cassava and bananas, topped with grated coconut and margarine.
- Tambo-tambong: A creamy and sweet dessert made from glutinous rice balls (known as bilo-bilo in Tagalog) simmered in coconut milk along with assorted root crops and fruits.

=== Literature ===
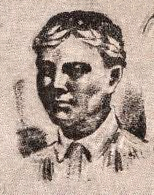
Pedro Bucaneg the Father of Ilocano literature

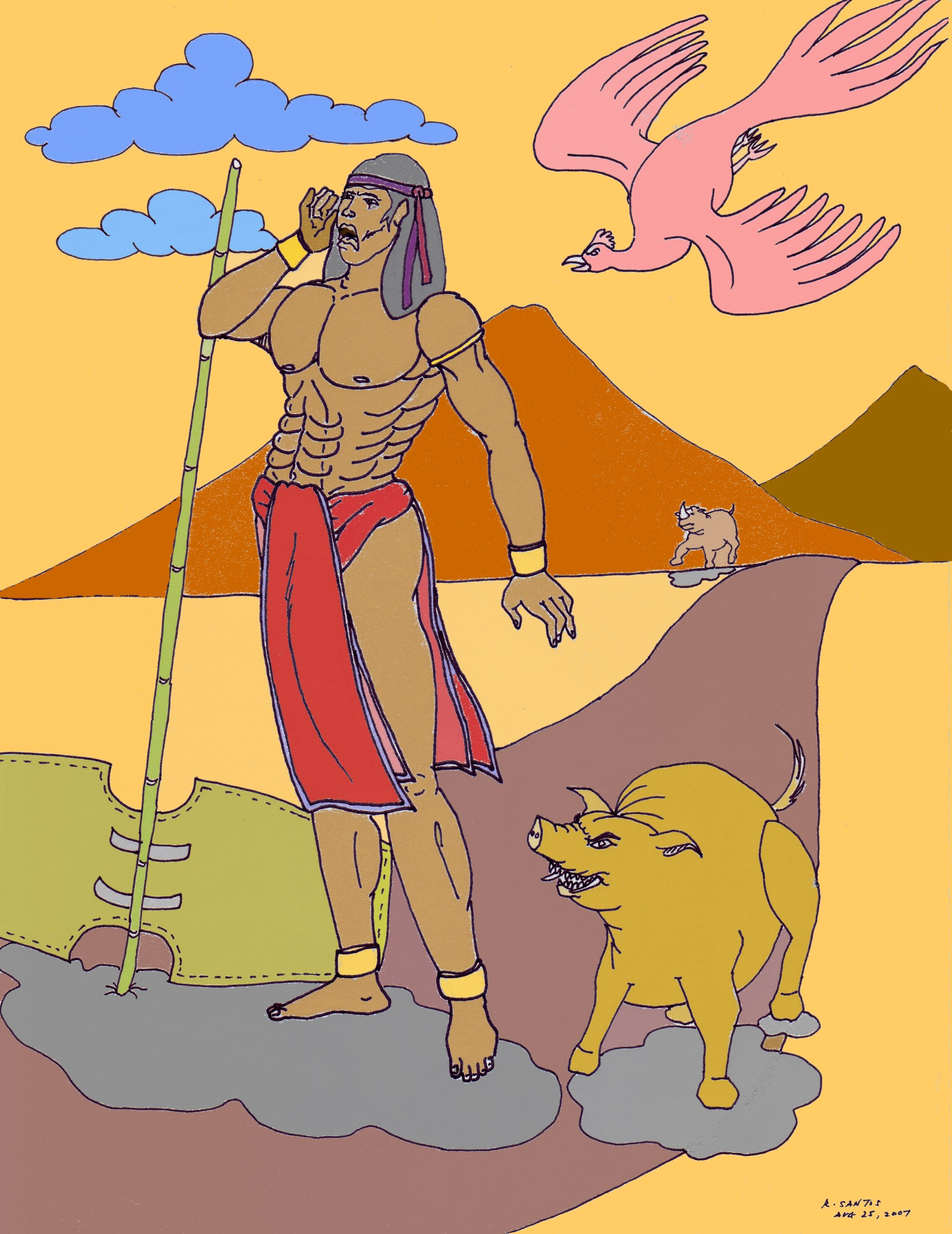
An illustration depicting the protagonist Lam-ang with his magical pets, a dog, and a rooster

Ilocano literature draws on traditional Ilocano mythology, folklore, and superstition.

Epic or epiko, at the heart of Ilocano literature lies its epic poetry, with Biag ni Lam-ang (The Life of Lam-ang) being the most notable example. Believed to have originated in the pre-colonial period, the epic was preserved through oral transmission across generations of poets. Its first transcription is sometimes attributed to the 17th-century blind poet-preacher Pedro Bucaneg, often regarded as the "Father of Ilocano Poetry."

However, historian E. Arsenio Manuel contends that the earliest written version was produced by Fr. Blanco of Narvacan in collaboration with folklorist and publicist Isabelo de los Reyes.The poem embodies core Ilocano values such as courage, loyalty, and respect for familial and ancestral ties, making it a crucial cultural artifact that has survived colonial influences.

Poem, or dandániw in Ilocano, Ilocano poetry has a rich tradition that has evolved over centuries. Ancient Ilocano poets expressed their thoughts and emotions through various forms, including folk and war poems and songs (dállot), which are improvised long poems delivered in a melodic fashion. These poetic forms not only served as artistic expressions but also as vehicles for cultural transmission.

Proverbs, or pagsasaó, are an essential aspect of Ilocano literature. These succinct sayings encapsulate moral lessons, cultural values, and practical advice, serving as guiding principles in daily life. They are often shared during conversations, gatherings, and even formal occasions, reinforcing social bonds and community cohesion.

"Ti tao nga sadot, uray agtodo ti balitok, haan to pulos a makipidot."
"A lazy person, even if it rains gold, will not pick one"

Literary Duels or Búcanégan represents the unique literary duel tradition of the Ilocanos, akin to the Tagalog Balagtasan. Named after Pedro Bucaneg, these verbal jousts involve participants engaging in poetic debates, showcasing their wit, creativity, and linguistic prowess. Bucanegan not only entertains but also serves as a platform for social commentary, allowing the community to address relevant issues through the lens of humor and poetry.

Riddles or burburtia, are another important form of Ilocano literature. These clever wordplay challenges test the intellect of both the speaker and the audience, fostering critical thinking and community engagement. Riddles often draw from nature, everyday life, and cultural references, making them a delightful and educational part of Ilocano oral tradition.

"Sangkabassit a waig, Naaladan ti pino a kakawayanan." - Mata
"A little lake, Fence in by a fine bamboo strip" - Eye

Publications

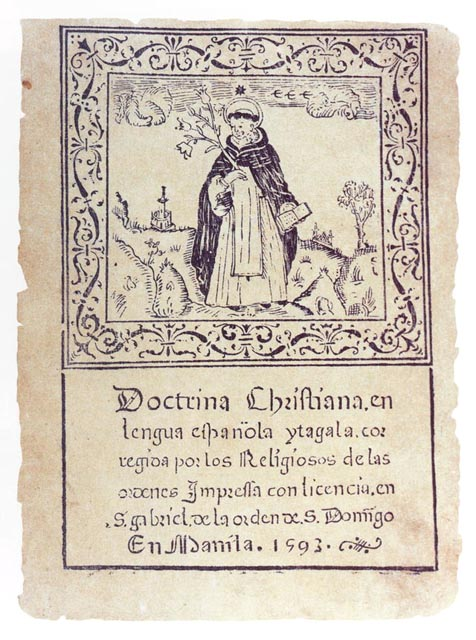
Doctrina Cristiana by Francisco Lopez

Ilocano literature began to flourish during the Spanish colonial period, with the publication of the Doctrina Cristiana in 1621 by Francisco Lopez. This was the first printed book in Ilocano, marking a significant milestone in the written tradition of the Ilocano people. Such works, including Sumario de las Indulgencias de la Santa Correa, played a pivotal role in the spread of literacy and education among the Ilocano-speaking population, contributing to the cultural and intellectual development of the region.

In the late 19th century, Ilocano literature gained further recognition through the efforts of Isabelo de los Reyes, a prominent Ilocano scholar and writer. He published works like Ilocandias (1887), Articulos Varios (1887), and Historia de Filipinas (1889). His two-volume Historia de Ilocos (1890) became a cornerstone in documenting the history of Ilocos. Another significant literary achievement during this period was Matilde de Sinapangan, the first Ilocano novel, written by Fr. Rufino Redondo in 1892.

20th century

The 19th and 20th centuries saw the emergence of prominent Ilocano authors. Leona Florentino, often referred to as the "National Poetess of the Philippines," became a prominent figure in the literary landscape despite mixed critical reception of her sentimental poetry. Other notable authors include Manuel Arguilla, whose works capture the essence of Ilocano culture during the early 20th century, and Carlos Bulosan, whose novel America is in the Heart resonates deeply with the Filipino-American experience. Additionally, Isabelo de los Reyes played a pivotal role in preserving Ilocano literary heritage, contributing to the publication of essential works like the earliest known text of Biag ni Lam-ang.

The 20th century marked a significant turning point in Ilocano literature, characterized by a growing recognition of its cultural importance. Authors like F. Sionil Jose and Elizabeth Medina emerged as influential voices. GUMIL Filipinas, or "Gunglo dagiti Mannurat nga Ilokano iti Filipinas", is an association of Ilocano writers in the Philippines. It's also known as the Ilokano Writers Association of the Philippines.

GUMIL's goals include providing a forum for Ilocano writers to work together to improve their writing, enriching Ilocano literature and cultural heritage, publishing books and other writings, and helping members pursue their writing careers. GUMIL has many active members in provincial and municipal chapters, as well as in overseas chapters in the U.S., Hawaii, and Greece. GUMIL was once the first website to focus on Philippine literature.

First published in 1934, Bannawag is widely regarded as the "Bible of the North." It reaches the heart of Northern Luzon, as well as Visayas, Mindanao, and Ilocano communities in Hawaii and America's West Coast. Bannawag highlights family values in its stories and articles and through the years has continued to inspire, entertain, and empower its readers. Bannawag (Iloko word meaning "dawn") is a Philippine weekly magazine published in the Philippines by Liwayway Publications Inc. It contains serialized novels/comics, short stories, poetry, essays, news features, entertainment news and articles, among others, that are written in Ilokano, a language common in the northern regions of the Philippines.

Bannawag has been acknowledged as one foundation of the existence of contemporary Iloko literature. It is through the Bannawag that every Ilokano writer has proved his mettle by publishing his first Iloko short story, poetry, or essay, and thereafter his succeeding works, in its pages. The magazine is also instrumental in the establishment of GUMIL Filipinas, the umbrella organization of Ilocano writers in the Philippines and in other countries.

=== Social Structure ===
==== Pre-colonial Social Structure ====
In the pre-colonial period, the Spanish applied the term "barangay" to the settlements they encountered in the Ilocos region, but the Ilocano people had their own terms. They referred to their towns as íli and smaller groups of houses as purók. The residents of the íli were organized into a structured class society, where every individual had a role based on their status, lineage, and contributions to the community.

At the top of this class system was the agtúray or ári (chief) and his family. The ári earned his position due to his strength, wealth, and wisdom. The role of the ári was crucial in the íli, as he governed the community, administered justice, and led his people in times of war if necessary. This leadership position was typically hereditary and passed down to a male heir. However, in situations where no male heir was available, a strong female could inherit the position. If the heir was deemed weak or unfit by the community, the ári family could lose their status, and a new ruling family might rise to power. The ári ruled alongside a council of elders, known as amáen or panglakáyen íli, who helped with the administration of justice and governance of the íli.

Below the ári were the babaknáng, the wealthy class. Some members of this class could ascend to the role of ári, given their wealth and influence. The babaknáng were engaged in trade with other groups, including the Chinese, Japanese, Igorots, and Tagalogs. The goods they traded included rice, cotton, gold, wax, iron, glass beads, honey, and stoneware jars called burnáy. This trade network helped the babaknáng maintain and grow their wealth, ensuring their continued influence in the íli.

Below the babaknáng were the kailianes, a class that played a supportive role to the ári. The kailianes assisted the ári with tasks such as sailing, working in the fields, and preparing for community celebrations. In exchange for their service, they received gifts directly from the ári. This relationship fostered a sense of reciprocity and mutual benefit between the classes.

Further down the social ladder were the katalonan, tenant farmers who formed the majority of the population. These farmers cultivated wet-rice fields, growing crops such as rice and taro, while also practicing dry agriculture for cotton. They were essential to the economic stability of the íli as they provided the necessary agricultural products for trade and sustenance.

At the bottom of pre-colonial Ilocano society were the ubíng (servants) and below them, the tagábu (slaves, also called adípen). The tagábu often became slaves due to unresolved debt, insults to a member of the babaknáng or ári, being prisoners of war, or even inheriting the debt of their ancestors. Slavery was not always permanent, but it represented the lowest rung of the social ladder, with limited opportunities for upward mobility.

==== Colonial social structure ====
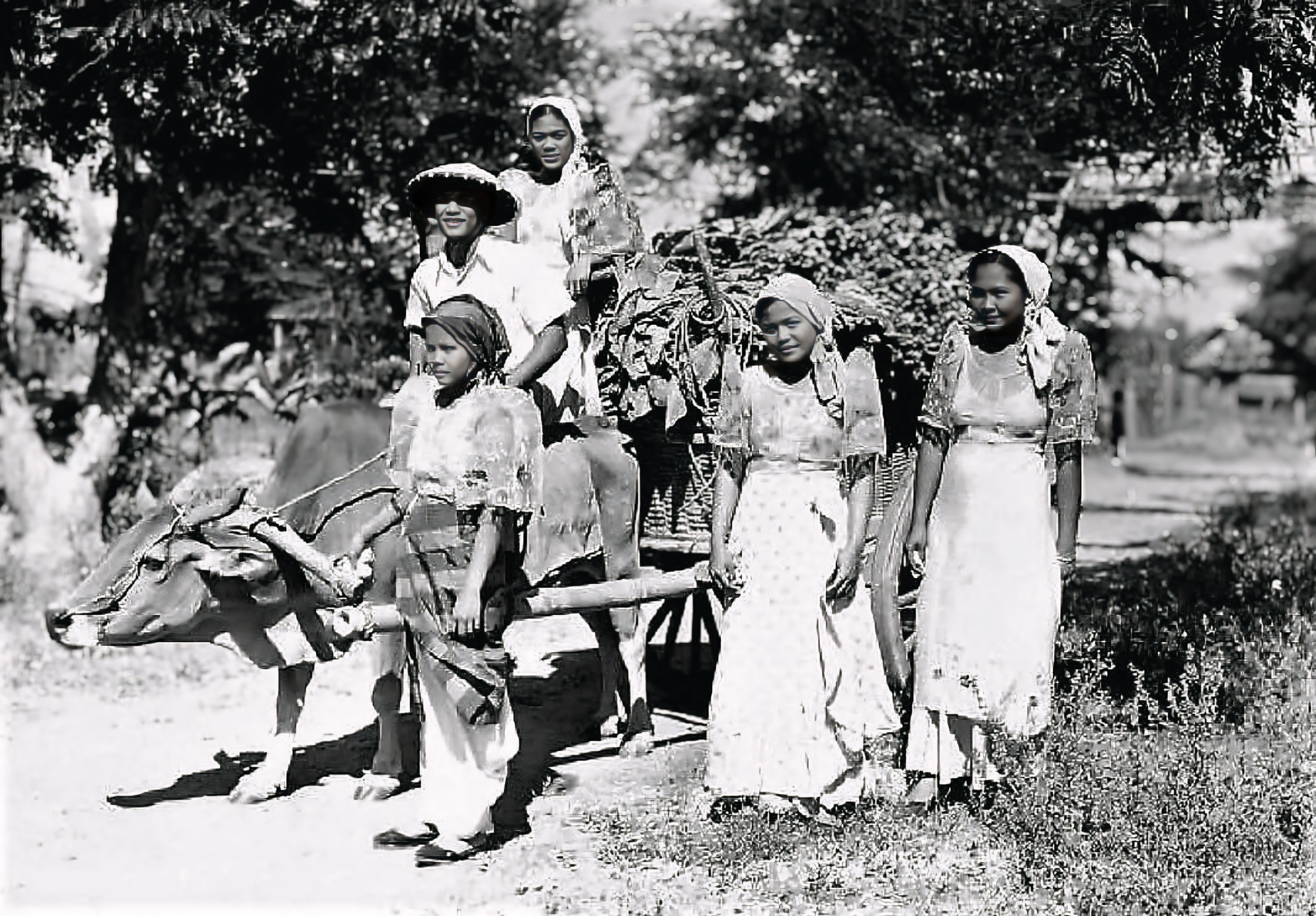
An Ilocano farming family from Tagudin, Ilocos Sur, c. 1920s

During the colonial era, Ilocano society underwent significant changes, but much of its pre-colonial social structure remained intact, with the Spanish adding their own layers of influence and control. Ilocano society became even more clearly defined by a hierarchical system, where social status and economic power determined one's role and opportunities within the community.

At the top of colonial Ilocano society were the babaknang or agtuturay (leaders), who had transformed into the principalia, the ruling class under Spanish rule. These powerful families held the highest positions in local governance, such as gobernadorcillo (town mayor) and cabeza de barangay (barangay head). Their responsibilities included managing the community, ensuring the collection of taxes, and maintaining order on behalf of the Spanish crown.

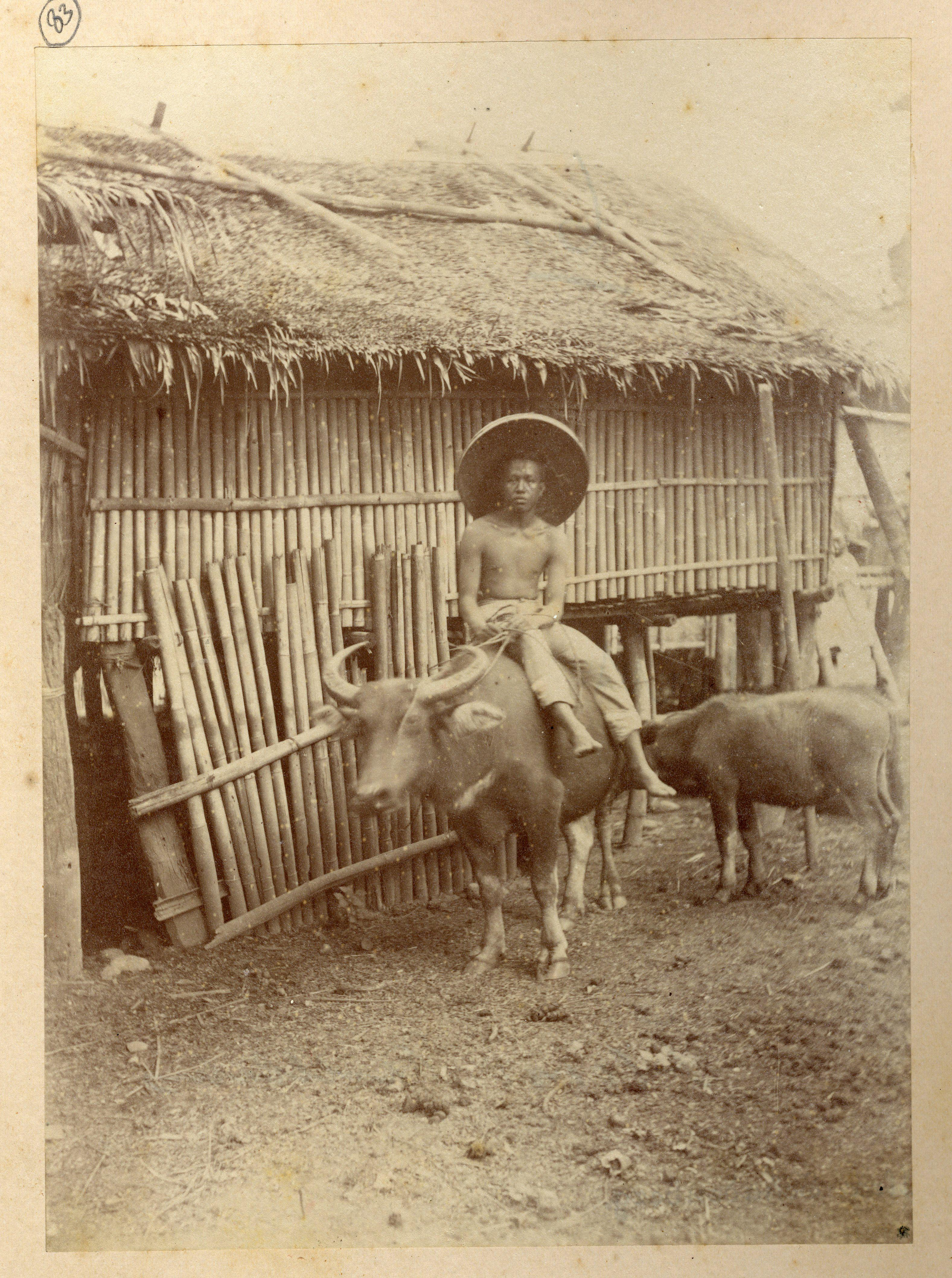
An Ilocano man on a carabao-drawn wagon in front of his house, circa 1885.

The principales enjoyed numerous privileges, including tax exemptions and the right to hold public office. They were also granted honorary titles such as "Don" and "Doña," further distinguishing them from the rest of the population. The principalia were considered the local aristocracy, and their power extended beyond wealth. They wielded immense political and social influence within their communities, often acting as intermediaries between the Spanish authorities and the local population. The status of the principales was typically passed down through generations, ensuring the continued dominance of elite families. However, in certain cases, the title could be granted by royal decree. For instance, on December 20, 1863, a decree by José de la Concha, the Minister of the Colonies under Queen Isabella II, granted the title to individuals who had contributed significantly to the local community. The principales were known as "de privilegio y gratis" because they were exempt from paying taxes, unlike the rest of the population, who were required to pay tribute to the colonial government.

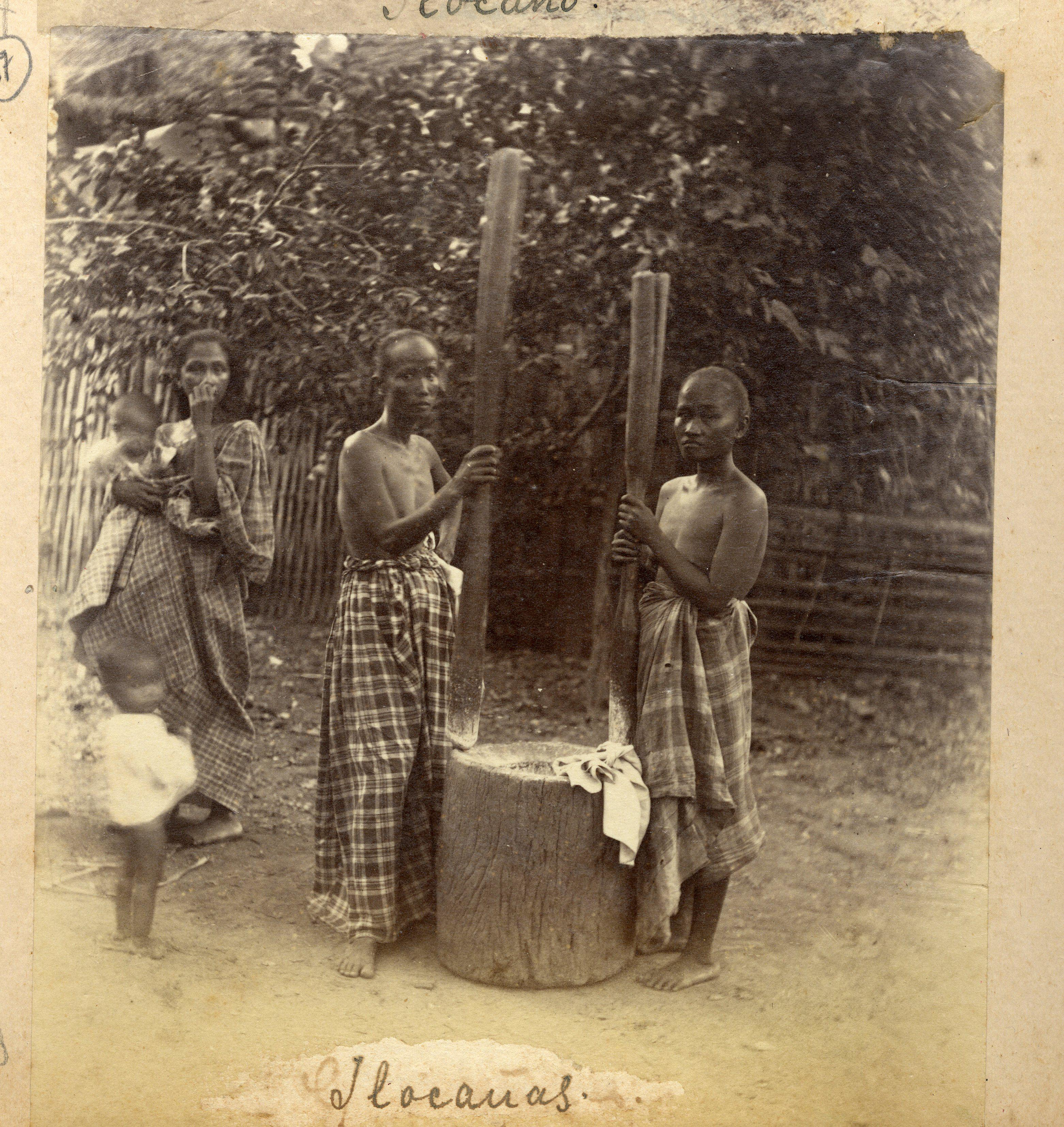
Ilocano women pounding rice using a wooden mortar (alsóng) and pestle (al-ó), circa 1885.

Beneath the babaknang were the cailianes, free individuals who typically owned small home lots but worked the farmlands of the babaknang. These tenant farmers cultivated the land in exchange for a share of the harvest. In addition to farming, the cailianes also served as artisans and specialists, such as healers, salt makers, stem cutters, and wood gatherers, whose skills were indispensable to the community.

The relationship between the babaknang and the cailianes was characterized by a system of mutual exchange. During the agricultural season or community gatherings, the cailianes provided labor and assistance to the babaknang. In return, the babaknang compensated them with food or other goods, maintaining a bond of reciprocity that was essential for social cohesion.

At the lowest level of the colonial social structure were the adipen or slaves. These individuals became slaves either through birth, as a result of debt, or due to their inability to meet obligations. The adipen were entirely dependent on their masters for their livelihood and performed a variety of tasks, including agricultural labor and domestic duties.

Unlike the cailianes, who retained some degree of independence, the adipen had very limited autonomy. However, the concept of slavery in Ilocano society was not entirely rigid; it was possible for adipen to gain freedom through various means, such as paying off debts or being granted manumission by their masters.

== Notable Ilocanos ==
=== Religious figures ===
- Zacarias "Apo Kari" Agatep (1936–1982) – parish priest of Our Lady of Hope Parish in Caoayan, Ilocos Sur; jailed for four months in 1980 for speaking against foreign and local monopolies in the tobacco industry and released as a publicity stunt before the visit of Pope John Paul II. Honored at the Bantayog ng mga Bayani memorial for his resistance to the excesses of the Marcos dictatorship.
- Gregorio Aglipay – first Supreme Bishop of the Aglipayan Church
- Jeremias Aquino (1949–1981) – priest of the Iglesia Filipina Independiente; jailed in 1979 as a political prisoner, and famously staged a hunger strike to protest prison conditions until he was released in 1980. Honored at the Bantayog ng mga Bayani memorial for protesting the abuses of the Martial Law administration.
- José Burgos (1837–1872) – Filipino priest and martyr
- Isabelo de los Reyes – founder of the Aglipayan Church and prominent writer and politician
- Antonio Mabutas – first Bishop of the Diocese of Laoag and the second Archbishop of the Archdiocese of Davao. Historically notable as the first Roman Catholic Archbishop to write a pastoral letter to criticize human rights violations under the Marcos dictatorship.

=== Leaders and politicians ===
- Pedro Almazan – leader from Laoag; proclaimed and crowned King of Ilocos; led the First Ilocos Revolt in January 1661
- Magnolia Antonino (1915–2010) – senator of the Philippines; married to Gaudencio Antonino, also a senator
- Rodolfo "Pong" Gaspar Biazon (1935–2023) – former General and Chief of Staff of the Armed Forces of the Philippines, Philippine Marines officer, and politician in the Philippines. He was elected Senator in the 1992 election for a term of three years. He was elected to his first six-year term in the 1998 election and was re-elected in the 2004 election.
- Conchita Carpio-Morales – former Ombudsman of the Philippines and Associate Justice of the Supreme Court of the Philippines
- Erlinda Fadera-Basilio – ambassador and permanent representative of the Philippines to the United Nations and other international organizations in Geneva, Switzerland; the first woman Vice President of the UN Human Rights Council; founding member of the English Speaking Union (ESU), Philippines Chapter
- General Antonio Luna – general of Emilio Aguinaldo's era
- Ferdinand Marcos – 10th President of the Philippines, known for amassing wealth and for the human rights abuses under his dictatorship of the country
- Bongbong Marcos – 17th president of the Philippines and the only son of former president and dictator Ferdinand Marcos. He served as governor of Ilocos Norte from 1998 to 2007. He also served as a representative of Ilocos Norte's 2nd District. He was formerly a Senator of the Philippines.
- Maria Imelda Josefa Romualdez Marcos (also known as Imee Marcos) – daughter of former president Ferdinand Marcos, is a former representative of the 2nd District of Ilocos Norte in the Philippine House of Representatives (1998 to 2007) and governor of Ilocos Norte since 2010
- Mariano Marcos – lawyer and a politician; father of Ferdinand Marcos
- Ernesto Maceda (also known as "Manong Ernie") – Filipino politician, lawyer, and columnist who first gained national prominence in Ferdinand Marcos' cabinet as the Presidential Assistant on Community Development, but resigned in protest upon the declaration of martial law in 1972. He later became as a senator of the Philippines from 1971 to 1972 and again from 1987 to 1998, servings as Senate President from 1996 to 1998.
- Quintín Paredes (1884–1973) – a Filipino lawyer, politician, and statesman
- Juan Ponce Enrile – a former senator who served as Senate President from 2008 to 2013
- Elpidio Quirino – 6th President of the Philippines (1948–1953) and native of Caoayan, Ilocos Sur
- Artemio Ricarte (1866–1945) – Filipino general during the Philippine Revolution and the Philippine–American War; considered by the Armed Forces of the Philippines as the "Father of the Philippine Army". Ricarte is also notable for never having taken an oath of allegiance to the United States government, which occupied the Philippines from 1898 to 1946.
- Fabian Ver – former General and Chief of the Armed Forces of the Philippines

=== Activists ===
- David Bueno – Filipino human rights lawyer and radio show host from Ilocos Norte during the Marcos Martial Law era. Assassinated during the early part of the succeeding Aquino administration and later honored at the Bantayog ng mga Bayani memorial.
- Niña Corpuz – indigenous textiles advocate, businesswoman, and former Filipino journalist from Batac, Ilocos Norte
- Armando "Mandrake" Ducusin Palabay – Filipino student leader and activist; honored at the Bantayog ng mga Bayani memorial as a martyr of the resistance against the Marcos dictatorship
- Josefa Llanes Escoda – women's rights activist, founder of the Girl Scouts of the Philippines

=== Artists, actors, athletes, and writers ===
- Leona Florentino (1849 –1884) - Ilokano foundational poet, dramatist, satirist, and playwright who is also known as the Mother of Philippine Women's Literature and honored in France, Spain, the Philippines, and the United States. Her son is the revolutionary Isabelo de los Reyes, who became senator and championed his mother's causes after her death.
- Manuel Arguilla (1911–1944) – Ilokano writer, resistance fighter, and martyr. Widely recognized as a leading author in Philippine literature before World War II. He is best remembered for the literary collection How My Brother Leon Brought Home a Wife and Other Short Stories, which won first prize in the Commonwealth Literary Contest in 1940. He joined the resistance against the Japanese occupation during World War II, and was beheaded among a group of other guerillas at the Manila Chinese Cemetery on August 30, 1944.
- Sonny Cabatu (born October 10, 1960) – semi-retired Filipino professional basketball player in the Philippine Basketball Association who was the very first draft pick of the league in 1985. He is also the father of current Barangay Ginebra Kings player Junjun Cabatu.
- Marcelino Crisologo – writer, playwright, and first governor of Ilocos Sur
- Lilia Cuntapay – Filipina horror actress
- Japoy Lizardo – Filipino actor and athlete
- Juan Luna – famous Filipino painter, older brother of Antonio Luna
- Guji Lorenzana – Filipino actor and singer
- Lucrecia Kasilag (1918 –2008) – National Artist of the Philippines for Music as a composer and pianist; known for incorporating indigenous Filipino instruments into orchestral productions
- Jimboy Martin – Filipino actor originally from Nueva Vizcaya
- Bienvenido Nebres – longest-serving university president of Ateneo de Manila University; member of the board of trustees of Georgetown University, Regis University, the Asian Institute of Management (where he sits as vice-chair), and other colleges and universities in the Philippines
- Jane Oineza – Filipina actress
- Robin Padilla – Filipino actor and politician, from Nueva Ecija
- Markus Paterson – Filipino actor
- Jericho Rosales – Filipino actor
- Maja Salvador – Filipina actress
- Gabriela Silang – leader of the Ilocano independence movement from Spain after death of her husband, the revolutionary Diego Silang
- Luis "Chavit" Singson (born June 21, 1941) – Filipino politician from Vigan City and former governor of Ilocos Sur. He is the owner of the Partas Bus Company. Singson is said to have started EDSA II, when in October 2000 he alleged he gave President Joseph Estrada PHP400 million as payoff from illegal gambling profits.
- Jessica Soho (born March 27, 1964) – Filipino broadcast journalist, documentarian, and news director who received a George Foster Peabody Award and was the first Filipino to win the British Fleet Journalism Award in 1998
- Máximo Villaflor Solivén (1929–2006) – prominent Filipino journalist and newspaper publisher; co-founder and publisher of the Philippine Star. His daily column published in the Star, titled "By The Way", was one of the most widely read newspaper columns in the Philippines.
- Nova Villa – Filipino actress
- Teófilo Yldefonso (1903–1943) – Filipino swimmer known as "the Ilocano Shark" who specialized in the breaststroke. He was the first Filipino to win an Olympic medal, and the only Filipino to win multiple medals.

=== Ilocano people from Pangasinan ===
- Anne Curtis – Filipina actress whose mother is Ilocano from Pangasinan
- Jasmine Curtis-Smith – Filipina actress, younger sister of Anne Curtis
- Jhong Hilario – Filipino actor, host, and dancer
- Danny Ildefonso – professional basketball player who played in San Miguel Beerman, now Petron Blaze Boosters, who won 8 PBA championships and 2 MVP's and rookie of the year award in 1998. He is fluent in Ilocano.
- Marc Pingris – Filipino basketball player from Sison.
- Fidel V. Ramos – 12th President of the Philippines (1992–1998) from Lingayen, Pangasinan
- F. Sionil José – novelist

=== Ilocano people from Central Luzon ===
- Gregorio C. Brillantes – a multi-award-winning fiction writer and magazine editor, is one of the Philippines' greatest writers in English
- Onofre Corpuz – writer and former secretary of the Department of Education; 13th president of the University of the Philippines; president of the Development Bank of the Philippines
- Ramon Magsaysay – 7th President of the Philippines
- JB Magsaysay – actor, housemate on Pinoy Big Brother (season 1), and grandson of former President Ramon Magsaysay
- Nicanor Reyes Sr. – founder and first president of the Far Eastern University in Manila. He envisioned a school that would promote the teaching of accounting to Filipinos, a profession formerly available only to foreigners. His hometown was Paniqui, Tarlac.
- Ruby Rodriguez – Filipina actress and a co-host of the television variety show Eat Bulaga! in the Philippines; from San Marcelino, Zambales
- Paulino Santos – former chief of staff of the Philippine Army during the time of Philippine President Manuel Luis Quezon; founder of Penal Colonies and a Philippine Constabulary Second Lieutenant

=== Other notable Filipinos of Ilocano ancestry ===
- Kurt Barbosa – Sea Games taekwondo championship, whose ancestors were natives from Abra
- Antonio Carpio – Associate Justice; his father is Ilocano
- Delfin Lorenzana - Retired major general, former secretary of National Defense from 2016 to 2022, part of the Maagap Class of 1973; his parents are Ilocanos from San Quintin, Pangasinan who traces roots from Ilocos Sur and La Union
- Bela Padilla – actress from Nueva Ecija
- Bianca King – Filipina actress; her mother is Ilokana
- Bryan Termulo – singer; her mother is Ilocana from La Union
- Ces Drilon – Filipina news anchor; her father is Ilocano
- Coleen Garcia – Filipina actress; her mother is Ilokana from La Union
- Darren Espanto – Filipino singer; his parents are Ilocano From Nueva Vizcaya
- Daniel Padilla – actor; his paternal grandmother is Ilokana and the sister of Bela Padilla's maternal grandmother
- Doug Kramer – Filipino basketball player; his mother is from La Union
- Emmylou "Lala" Taliño-Mendoza – Governor of Cotabato (2010–2019, 2022–present) of Ilocano descent
- Gloria Macapagal-Arroyo – daughter of Eva Macapagal from Pangasinan
- Isabelle Daza – daughter of Gloria Diaz
- Jake Cuenca - Filipino American actor, From Ilocos Norte
- Joseph Emilio Abaya – DOTC secretary from Candon, Ilocos Sur; he is a descendant of Isabelo Abaya of Candon, Ilocos Sur, "one of the greatest heroes of the Revolution in the entire North"
- Jessy Mendiola – Filipina actress; her mother Didith Garvida is from Bangui, Ilocos Norte
- Jonha Richman – Filipino-businesswoman; her mother is from Bangued, Abra
- Kylie Padilla – Filipina actress; her father, Robin Padilla, is an Ilocano from Nueva Ecija
- Marilou Diaz-Abaya – Filipina director and National Artist of the Philippines for Film and Broadcast Arts; her father is from Paoay, Ilocos Norte
- Liza Soberano – Filipino-American model and actress; her father and ancestors are Ilocanos from Sta. Maria, Asingan, and Baguio
- Mac Alejandre – Filipino director
- Orlando Quevedo – a Filipino cardinal of Roman Catholic Church, served as an Archbishop Emeritus of Cotabato from 1998 to 2018. He was born and spent his very early years in Laoag, Ilocos Norte but was raised in Koronadal (Marbel), South Cotabato, where he finished his remaining grade school and entire high school years. The first cardinal from Mindanao.
- Vice Ganda (also known as Jose Mari Viceral) – Filipino comedian; his mother is Ilokana from La Union.
- Yassi Pressman – actress; her mother is from Isabela
- Aquilino "Nene" Pimentel Jr. - a Filipino politician and human rights lawyer during the Martial Law under Marcos administration, former mayor of Cagayan de Oro from 1980 to 1984; his mother is an ethnic Ilokana from Batac, Ilocos Norte
- Lawrence Fortun - Filipino politician, mayor of Butuan (2022–present), former Agusan del Norte 1st district representative (2013–2022); his mother is Ilokana from San Fernando, La Union

=== Foreign nationals of Ilocano ancestry ===
- Pedro Flores – businessman and toymaker who has been credited with popularizing the yo-yo in the United States
- John Leo Dato – Filipino-American boxer
- Matthew Libatique – American Hollywood cinematographer and Oscar nominee best known for his work with director Darren Aronofsky on such films as A Star is Born, Iron Man, Iron Man 2, Inside Man, Miracle at St. Anna, Gothika, Cowboys & Aliens, π, Requiem for a Dream, The Fountain, and Black Swan
- Jasmine Trias – 3rd-place winner in American Idol Season 3
- Jocelyn Enriquez – singer in the Dance Music Genre who performed the hit songs "A Little Bit of Ecstasy" and "Do You Miss Me"
- Benny Agbayani – professional baseball player
- Larry Ramos (born Hilario Ramos on April 19, 1942) – professional guitar player and singer who was awarded a Grammy for his participation in the 1962 album, Presenting The New Christy Minstrels, and who was a key part of the 1960s American pop band the Association
- Thelma Buchholdt, J.D. – elected member, Alaska State House of Representatives (1974–1982)
- Carlos Bulosan – novelist and poet best known for his novel America Is in the Heart
- Mikey Bustos – YouTube star and Canadian Idol finalist
- Ben Cayetano – 5th Governor of Hawaii (1994–2002)
- Philip Vera Cruz – labor union leader
- Emil Guillermo – journalist and 2000 American Book Award winner
- Gina Ortiz Jones – Filipina-American Iraq War veteran, intelligence officer and politician
- Ana "The Hurricane" Julaton – professional boxer who is an International Boxing Association and World Boxing Organization world title holder as of 2010
- Lt. Gen. Edward Soriano – first Filipino-American General of the US Army (ret)
- Maj. Gen. Antonio Taguba – second Filipino-American General of the US Army
- Brian Viloria – light flyweight boxing champion
- PJ Raval – Filipino-American filmmaker and director of the feature documentary Call Her Ganda about the murder of Jennifer Laude by US Marine Joseph Scott Pemberton
- Bretman Rock – social media influencer and makeup artist; his parents were from the province of Cagayan, and he currently lives in Hawaii

== See also ==
- Ethnic groups in the Philippines
