= Funeral practices and burial customs in the Philippines =

Customs for the dead commonly practiced in the Philippines

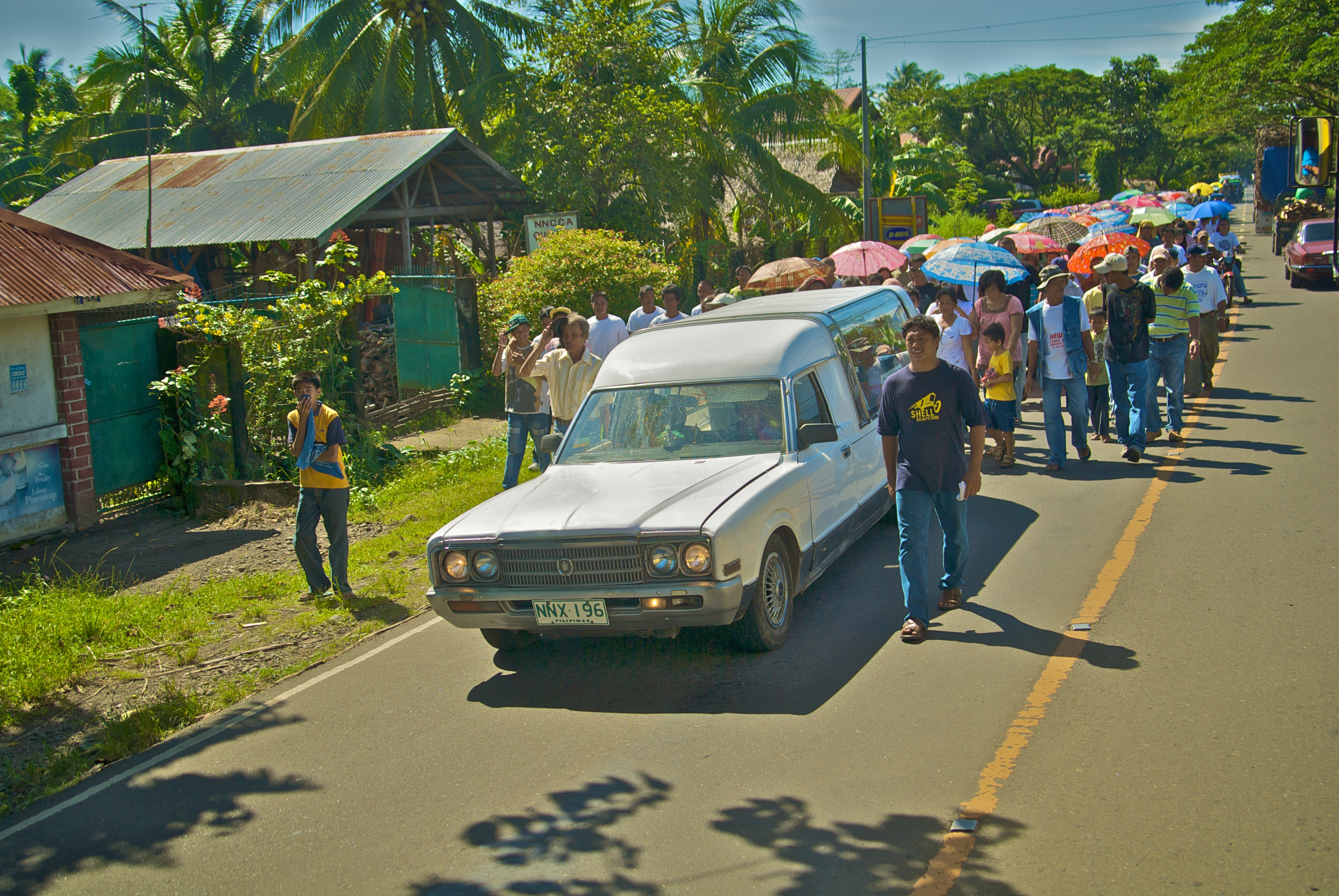
A funeral procession in the Philippines, 2009

During the Pre-Hispanic period the early Filipinos believed in a concept of life after death. This belief, which stemmed from indigenous ancestral veneration and was strengthened by strong family and community relations within tribes, prompted the Filipinos to create burial customs to honor the dead through prayers and rituals. Due to different cultures from various regions of the Philippines, many different burial practices have emerged. For example, the Manobos buried their dead in trees, the Ifugaos seated the corpse on a chari before it was brought to a cave and buried elsewhere. The most common forms of traditional burials are supine pits, earthenware jars, and log coffins, and have been a topic of interest among Philippine archaeologists since the early 20th century.

Present-day Filipinos have retained the belief of life after death from their ancestors but generally practice Western religions such as Catholicism. The most prominent contemporary practice of honoring the dead is by holding a wake and a following mourning period. Modern traditions reflect indigenous values as well as influences of the Philippines' Spanish, American, and Chinese inhabitants.

== Types of indigenous Filipino burials ==
There are a wide variety of indigenous Filipino burial methods that have been found across the islands. Each burial custom was different and depended on the family and the region they were located. Some burial types were more prominent in certain locations than others. Among the range of preservation processes and burial customs, some of the most common were mummification, enclosed burials, and log coffins.

=== Mummification ===
Mummification attributed to the preservation of the dead and the customs. In many regions, having the body displayed in their homes is a form of honoring them in the afterlife and is done so in places such as Kabayan, Benguet, where bodies are preserved through processes of dehydration and smoking. Mummification in the Philippines is almost always due to intentional man-made preservation. The warm, wet climate of the islands is not favorable to natural mummification processes and naturally occurring mummies are very rare as a result.

=== Enclosed burials and log coffin burials ===
Enclosed burials most often refers to the different types of jar enclosed burials. There are three types: primary, secondary, and multiple jar burials. These same three categories also exist for log coffin burials. A primary burial is when the cadaver is completely disposed of. A secondary burial involves a corpse being removed from its initial grave location and being placed in another grave or ossuary. Multiple burials signify bones of different skeleton being placed in the same grave. Jar burials can also obtain anthropomorphic features on them to represent the person that died, and was then placed into the jar. These features can give hints about the sex and age of the corpse.

== Filipino Christian and Muslim burial customs ==
=== Wakes, burials, and mourning ===
Once a Filipino decedent dies, the family of the deceased often chooses to commemorate the person's life with a religious burial ritual. Filipino Catholics, such as Tagalog Catholics, generally hold a wake known as burol, lamay or paglalamay, a vigil that typically lasts for three to seven nights or sometimes may last longer than the prescribed time, if the bereaved family is waiting for a relative traveling from afar. During this time, the cleaned and embalmed cadaver is placed inside a coffin and displayed at the house of the deceased or a funeral home. The coffin is traditionally surrounded by funeral lights, a guest registry book, a contribution box, and flowers. Family members, relatives, and acquaintances participate in the vigil.

Apart from offering condolences, mourners and visitors provide financial donations (abuloy) to help assuage the funeral and burial expenses. Food and drinks are customarily served by the bereaved during the night vigil, and typical activities conducted outside or near the vigil area include engaging in conversation, singing, guitar playing, and gambling – such as playing card games – to keep mourners awake.

On the funeral day, the coffin is generally loaded into a hearse or borne by family members, relatives, or friends in procession towards the church and later the cemetery. Other mourners follow the hearse during the funeral march. Catholic funerals involve the celebration of the Requiem Mass, while Protestant funerals include singing of hymns and recitation of prayers by a minister.

The traditional color worn at memorial services and interments is black, save for Chinese Filipinos and Ilocanos, who both customarily don white. If white clothing is worn, it is customary to have a small, rectangular black mourning pin on the left breast, which is evolved from small black fabric squares or ribbon pins. Some funerals have men wear the barong tagalog and black trousers while sporting a black armband as formal dress; other traditionally acceptable colours include shades of white. Women are often dressed in either black or white, with more conservative traditions adding veils and headbands matching the dresses. Red and loud colours are generally frowned upon as these are seen as celebratory.

After the entombment, mourners offer prayers such as the rosary for the dead every evening for nine days, a custom called the pasiyam or pagsisiyam (literally, "that which is done for nine days"). This novena period often ends with a service followed by formal meal with family and close friends. The custom is based on the pre-colonial folk belief that the soul of the departed enters the spirit world on the ninth day following death. This is followed by another Mass on the fortieth day after death, when the soul is believed to end its earthly wandering and transition into the afterlife, evoking the time period between Christ's Resurrection and Ascension. The bereavement period extends for a period of one year when another service is held on the first death anniversary, called the babang luksâ (lit., "descent from mourning").

Filipino Muslims do not practice wakes like the Christians, as Islamic custom mandates burial of the dead 24 hours after the time of death. This custom dates back to when the spread of disease was a prominent risk. Muslims were prompted to bury the corpse as soon as possible for sanitary reasons, such as avoiding the diseases that could come from the body. However, the burial and mourning periods are similar among the different religions. Both follow traditions of wearing black clothing and praying over the deceased during the burial. In addition, both have a custom of acknowledging the fortieth day after death. Muslims do not perform the pasiyam or pagsisiyam nor hold a death anniversary service, but often wear black clothing for the entirety of the forty-day mourning period.

It is socially acceptable for visitors to ask the bereaved questions deemed sensitive in other cultures. These include how the decedent died, whether he or she had suffered, or the cost of hospitalization or treatment. Such personal questions are intended to convey valid affection and concern for the deceased and the bereaved. People customarily offer Masses, novenas, and prayers for the benefit of the deceased and their family.

=== Death-centric holidays ===
Halloween is celebrated by Filipinos regardless of religious background, while Catholic and Aglipayan Filipinos pay respects to the ancestors on All Saints' Day and All Souls' Day, with celebrations lasting from October 31 to November 2. People gather in graveyards to clean and decorate the family grave as early as All Hallow's Eve to offer the dead prayers, candles, flowers and sometimes food. More often than not, mourners keep vigil overnight at graves, eating and making merry to pass the time and keep the dead company, reflecting the indigenous and modern traditions of venerating ancestors. A popular children's pastime during the vigils is to gather candle wax from melted candles to either play with or sell to candlemakers.

Due in part to external influences from the Philippines' colonial periods, the islands' death-centric holidays and associated traditions are similar to those of Spain, the United States of America, and Mexico. In particular, the Latin American holiday Dia de Los Muertos, or "Day of the Dead", is very similar in its cultural meaning and celebrations.

== Regional customs ==
=== Luzon ===
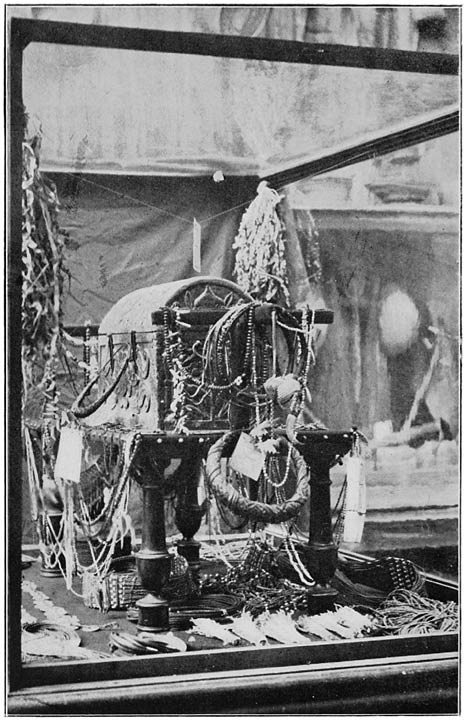
A coffin of an Igorot noble with his coronets and other ornaments (c. 1900)

==== Apayao ====
The Apayaos-also known as the Isnegs or Isnags-of the Cordillera Administrative Region, wrap the deceased person in a mat (ikamen), and is then carried on the shoulders of the immediate male family members. Items are placed inside the coffin in order to help the deceased person throughout his/her journey. For example, a jar (basi) is placed in the coffin to quench the deceased one's thirst. Another example is a spear and shield also being put inside in order to help him/her protect himself/herself from enemies during the journey. The coffin is then lowered into either the kitchen area of their families home or in a burial site owned by his/her family.

==== Benguet ====
For 9 consecutive days, the indigenous people from Benguet blindfold the dead and then place it on a chair that is located next to their house's main entrance. The arms and legs are tied together in a sitting position. A bangil rite is performed by the elders on the eve of the funeral, which is a chanted narration of the biography of the deceased. During interment, the departed is directed towards heaven by hitting bamboo sticks together.

==== Ifugao ====
The Ifugao people practice bogwa, which is the practice of exhuming the bones of the deceased person, cleaning and rewrapping them, and then returning them to the grave.

==== Tagalog ====
The Tagalog people have had numerous burial practices prior to Spanish colonization and Catholic introduction. In rural areas of Cavite, trees are used as burial places. The dying person chooses the tree beforehand, thus when he or she becomes terminally ill or is evidently going to die because old age, a hut is built close to the said tree. The deceased's corpse is then entombed vertically inside the hollowed-out tree trunk. Before colonization, a statue known as likha is also entombed with the dead inside the tree trunk. In Mulanay, Quezon and nearby areas, the dead are entombed inside limestone sarcophagi along with a likha statue. However, the practice vanished in the 16th century due to Spanish colonization. In Calatagan, Batangas and nearby areas, the dead are buried under the earth along with likha statues. The statues, measuring 6–12 inches, are personified depictions of anitos. Likha statues are not limited to burial practices as they are also used in homes, prayers, agriculture, medicine, travel, and other means.

==== Ilocano ====
Ilocanos observe distinct funeral and burial customs known as pompón or "burial rites" that last a year. These traditions are deeply rooted in respect for the deceased and their journey to the afterlife.

===== Wake =====
The preparation of the body, called bagongon, is typically done by the deceased’s spouse, particularly the wife. She carefully dresses the body, believing that the spirit of the deceased can convey messages through her. The body is then placed in a lungón (coffin), positioned so the head faces east, symbolizing the rising sun and hope, rather than west, which is considered inauspicious.

A wooden log, known as atong or panag-atong, is lit in front of the house and kept burning throughout the wake. This symbolizes the light guiding the deceased’s soul. Chanting and crying, known as dung-áw, which involves singing dirges and laments are performed to honor the deceased and ensure their safe passage to the afterlife. Food offering called atang also performed with prayers and different kind of kankanen (rice cakes).

During the wake, several taboos are observed:

- Immediate family members are prohibited from working, cooking, or carrying heavy objects, as these actions are believed to signify haste in burying the deceased.
- Sweeping the floor is avoided to prevent "sweeping away" another family member's life.
- Bathing is not allowed during the wake to prevent another death in the family and is believed to show disrespect by implying the deceased is offensive.
- A candle must remain lit beside the coffin as a light for the deceased’s soul. If the candle goes out, it is believed the deceased may lose their way in the afterlife.
- Eating beans or fruits with seeds is prohibited, as they are thought to cause skin diseases. Eating marunggáy (moringa) is also avoided because stripping its leaves is believed to symbolize family members dying one after another.

Family members wear black clothing, with women covering their heads and shoulders with a black veil called a manto. Immediate family members, such as the spouse, parents, or siblings, wear white headbands called baridbed. Traditionally, these headbands were worn to alleviate headaches caused by excessive crying, but they also serve as identifiers of mourning. Relatives wear black bar pins to signify grief until the fortieth day after the death.

===== Funeral =====
Before the burial, a hen and a rooster are beheaded. These chickens are believed to precede the deceased, symbolically announcing their arrival in the afterlife. The house’s windows are closed as the coffin is taken out to prevent the spirit from lingering. The coffin must not touch any part of the house, as this is believed to bring misfortune or another death in the family.

As the coffin is carried out, a family member scatters rice grains, symbolizing pammalubos or letting go of the deceased’s soul. If there are children in the family, they are passed over the coffin in a ritual called sukal, meant to protect the family from further loss. Items known as pabalon—such as personal belongings—are placed in the coffin, symbolizing the deceased’s “luggage” for their journey to the afterlife. The remaining possessions of the deceased are burned or thrown into a river to signify release and closure.

After the burial, family members undergo a ritual called diram-os, washing their hands and feet with water boiled with leaves of guava, guayabano, or dangla to ward off evil spirits that might have followed them from the cemetery.

===== Cleansing and commemoration =====
The day after the funeral, a cleansing ritual called gulgol is performed to remove grief, bad luck, and the lingering spirit of the deceased. Family members wash their hair with shampoo made from water, basí (sugarcane wine), or suká (vinegar). They burn arútang (rice stalks) and offer gawéd (betel pepper leaves) and pinádis (rolled tobacco) under the guidance of a prayer leader. The family offers rice cakes, boiled unripe bananas (saba), and basí to attendees after prayer sessions.

On the ninth night, a feast follows the novena prayers. This is repeated on the first death anniversary in a ceremony called panagwaksi or babangluksa, marking the end of the mourning period and celebrating the deceased's life.

==== Ilongot ====
The Ilongot is buried in a sitting position, and if a woman, has her hands tied to her feet, to prevent her "ghost" from roaming. The wife of the deceased person prepares the body with specially chosen clothes by herself, and is placed in a coffin in the center of the house when done. A wood log is then lit in the front of the house and is burned during the entire wake, and is completed by all the family members washing their hair with a special shampoo.

==== Itneg ====
The Itnegs of Abra have a customary habit of burying their dead under their houses.

==== Palaweño ====
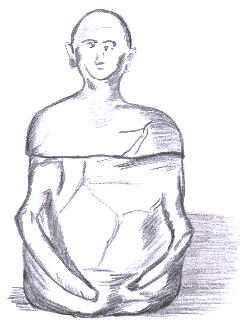
Sketch of an anthropomorphic jar from Maitum in the Saranggani Province of Mindanao

One of the ancient customs for burying the dead in the Philippines is through the use of burial jars known as Manunggul jars. These ancient potteries were found in the Manunggul Cave on the island of Palawan. A characteristic of the jars for the dead is the presence of anthropomorphic human figures on the pot covers. These figures embody souls riding a boat for the dead while seafaring towards their sanctuary in the afterlife. These containers have been dated from 710 BC to 890 BC. There are also figures of boating people steering paddles, wearing headbands, jaw-bands, and persons with hands folded across the chest area. The latter is a method of arranging the remains of the dead.

Other similar anthropomorphic jars were also found at Pinol (also spelled as Piñol), Maitum, in the Saranggani Province of the island of Mindanao. These funeral jars dates back from the Metal Age.

In addition to these jars, the 1965 archaeological excavations conducted by Robert Fox at Langen Island in El Nido, Palawan found that a cave known as Leta-leta Cave was a burial site that dates to the Late Neolithic Period.

==== Kankanaey ====
The more common burial custom of the Kankanaey people in Sagada, Mountain Province is for coffins to be tucked into crevices or stacked on top of each other inside limestone caves. The location depends on the status of the deceased as well as the cause of death. The coffins are small because the body inside the coffins are in a fetal position. This is due to the belief that people should leave the world in the same position as they entered it, a tradition common throughout the various pre-colonial cultures of the Philippines. The coffins are usually carved by their eventual occupants while they were still alive.

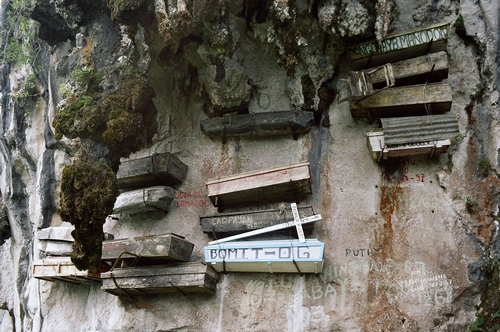
Hanging coffins at Sagada, Mountain Province in the Philippines

The Kankanaey also practice interring their dead in hanging coffins, a custom unique to the Sagada Kankanaey within the Philippines. In this practice, the coffins are placed underneath natural overhangs, either on natural rock shelves/crevices or on projecting beams slotted into holes dug into the cliff-side.

Hanging coffins are reserved for distinguished or honorable leaders of the community. They must have performed acts of merit, made wise decisions, and led traditional rituals during their lifetimes. The height at which their coffins are placed reflected their social status. Most people interred in hanging coffins are the most prominent members of the amam-a, the council of male elders in the traditional dap-ay. There is also one documented case of a woman being accorded the honor of a hanging coffin interment.

All of these burial customs require specific pre-interment rituals known as the sangadil. The Kankanaey believe that interring the dead in caves or cliffs ensures that their spirits (anito) can roam around and continue to protect the living.

==== Tinguian ====
For many weeks, the Tinguian people dress the dead body with the best garments, sit it on a chair, and sometimes put a lit tobacco source between the dead person's lips.

=== The Visayas ===
The Visayas has six major islands, namely: Panay, Negros, Cebu, Bohol, Samar, and Leyte. The islands are home to different ethnic groups, and have similarities and differences in their traditions.

==== Ancient practices in the Visayas ====
The paguli was a ritual performed when all efforts to heal the moribund had failed, in an effort to call back the departed soul. A coconut shell of water was set upon the dying person's stomach and was rotated to the chant: "Come back, soul, come back" as noted by Francisco Ignacio Alcina in 1668. In the case of a datu, some slaves could be sacrificed to appease ancestor spirits.

A cadaver was anointed and groomed, and shrouded in gold and jewelry. The deceased was dressed in gold to assure ready reception in the afterlife, and gold was placed within the mouth and between the layers of the many blankets that covered the body.

Visayan coffins called longon were made out of hardwood made out of a single tree trunk, which was fitted and pegged with a lid cut out of the same tree and sealed with resin. Persons of prominence and datus could be buried in a coffin with decorative carvings, and the carvings often executed by the future occupant himself. Poor Visayans were buried wrapped in banana leaves or simple caskets made out of thin boards or bamboo.

A corpse was placed within the coffin with all body cavities filled with betel sap, along with finery and heirlooms. Plates and saucers could be placed under the head like a pillow, or over the face and chest, in some areas some corpses could be adorned with masks or mouthpieces made of gold. Deceased infants, newborns, or aborted babies were buried in crocks or jars, even Chinese porcelain.

Grave sites varied considerably in the Visayas. Some graveyards were outside village borders, dug into banks of rivers or at the seacoast. Caves, or small islands would be used when available. Spiritual leaders and members of the datu class were not buried in public graveyards, and were buried under their houses or in the case of the babaylan, were exposed to the elements hanging from the branches of the balete tree.

Wakes lasted for as long as the bereaved family could offer food and drink for guests. Professional mourners who were generally old women, sang dirges to emphasize the grief of the survivors, and eulogized the qualities of the dead. The eulogies were considered a form of ancestor worship as they were addressed directly to the dead and included prayers of petition.

Widows and widowers observed three days of fasting and silence, wherein they did not bathe or comb their hair, and may even shave their hair and eyebrows as a special sign of grief. They abstained from eating cooked food until the mourning period ended. In the case of the death of a datu, his wives, or children: the community was placed under a strict mourning requirement called the pumaraw where no one was to wear colored clothes, climb coconut trees, or fish in certain streams; and spears were to be carried point down and side arms blade up. A mournful silence was to be conserved, and families could be enslaved as punishment for breaking the mourning interdict.

==== Cebuano ====
Funeral traditions of the Cebuano people also include nine-day recitation of the rosary, litanies, novenas, and Latin prayers after the burial, additionally chanting the Pahulayng Dayon or "Eternal Rest" (also known as "Gozos for the Dead"). Cebuanos also have superstitious beliefs related to funerals that include: placing funeral alms or limos into a container, refraining from sweeping the floor of the deceased's home (wastes are collected by hand instead of being swept by brooms; other Filipinos also have this superstition), no bathing and no combing of hair on the part of relatives (other Filipinos too believe in this), placing worn mourning pins into the coffin during interment, preventing tears from dropping onto the glass plate of the casket (in order for the departed soul to travel in peace), placing a chick on top of the coffin of an individual who died due to a transgression (to hasten justice for the dead victim), wearing black or white clothes during the interment (except for a child who is dressed with a red-colored garment, as a deterrent from seeing the ghost of the dead relative), urging relatives to pass through under the casket before it is loaded onto the funeral hearse (to assist the surviving relatives in moving on with their life), marching the dead towards the church and the cemetery (known as the hatod, or "carrying the departed to his destination" on foot), consuming food only at the cemetery after the interment, and passing through smoke while still within the cemetery or by the gates of the cemetery (to untangle the spirits of the dead from the bodies of the living).

==== Ilonggo ====
Merriment, singing, and poem recitations are components of funerals in Iloilo. Gambling is also permitted because gaming contributions help defray expenses incurred in burying the dead.

==== Waray ====
For those in Leyte, Samar and Biliran, practices are similar to the Cebuano and Ilonggo. A similar palina is practiced called tobas or kalipayan which is composed of water and some leaves of different plants, components of whose are known only to those who know how to create one.

=== Mindanao ===
Mindanao, as the second largest island in the Philippines, consist of several ethnic tribes influenced by Islamic culture. It consists of ARMM, Caraga, Davao, Northern Mindanao, Soccsksargen and Zamboanga Peninsula, marking 8 degrees North and 125 degrees East on the map.

==== 'T'boli ====
T'boli tribe thrive near Lake Sebu and has an interesting philosophy of death and life. They believed that death occurs if his/her spirit leave the body permanently by the evil spirit, Busao. So their burial custom starts with laying the corpse on the boat-shaped coffin, which will be celebrated from a week to five months (and even a year for respected people like datu). The tribe often throws feast for commemoration in a positive vibe. This body, together with the wooden boat will be burnt at the end of the long wake, where the liquid extract from burnt woods will be collected for eatery. The tribe believes that the good qualities of the dead will be passed over through that liquid extract.

==== Mamanuas ====
This tribe occupying Surigao del Norte has customs that fear the spirit of dead. The tribe community move their settlements when a death occurs, because they believed that the spirit of dead will come back for revenge. Therefore, the corpse is buried as close to his/her death as possible. This is accomplished using leaves, a mat and a coffin to cover the body either in the sitting or standing position. Just like usual burial, this coffin is buried under the soil or it is sometimes displayed on the platform for people in high positions within their community. The community mourns and prays for the dead for approximately 9 days.

==== Tausug ====
The Tausug people, primarily occupying Sulu, are mostly Muslims, thus, they have defined set of burial customs in the strong influence of their religion. The process of burial contains four steps: sutchihun (cleaning the body), saputan (wrapping the body), sambayanganun (obligatory prayer), and hikubul (burial). The grave is created hollow under 6 to 9 feet depth in north–south direction, which will be prayed upon by a religious man for a peaceful rest of the dead. Afterwards, the grave will be closed using ding ding hali (means "wall of the rest") made of huge flat slab.

==== Manobo ====
Manobos occupied hinterland areas which today are within Davao. Originally, they either wrapped the corpse in mat and bamboo slats to hang up on the tree or laid the dead on an elevated station (such as platform) beside the trees. Placing the body on an elevated place was believed to help the dead's soul reach the heaven. However, after the Americans introducing Abaca plantation system in the 20th century, the custom changed to burying the corpse under the house. Due to the plantation, it became impossible to simply move out from their places like how they did before. For Ata-Manobos occupying the forest areas of Davao, have the unique superstition in teaching Antuk (riddles) other than for wake ceremony will bring misfortune. So in Ata-manobos' joyful wake custom, close people of the deceased gather and sit around the corpse (in laid down position) and chat, tell stories, sing, dance, play instruments and more to elevate the atmosphere of grief.

==== Badjao ====
Similar to Manobo, Badjao tribe also carries out religious process to burying the dead. First, the body of dead will be positioned in the center of Umboh (floating hut) where it is laid parallel to the side wall. The preparation until the burial itself happens during the wake; first, food as homage will be brought, and the Song of the Dead will be sung. Second, the corpse-wrapping bandages are cut and washed in water while Imam (religious man) cleanses the body. Third, the dead will be dressed and decorated, which will later position itself lying on the floor. Next, Imam finally prays for the dead before the bandage completely covers the corpse. Then batik (a decoration) will be spread all over the cocoon. After finishing this ceremony within a day, Imam finally prays at the four corners of the buried site, then place Sundok (oblong stone that is believed to contain the spirit) near the head of the dead).

==== Subanen ====
The Subanu people had different burial procedure depending on the causes of death. For ordinary cause (dying due to age), the body was placed in the cemetery for common families. However, if for special cause (like contagion and illnesses), Balian or shaman is called to apply herbs and prayers on the dead for driving away evil spirits. After then, would they prepare for the wake by sculpting tree trunk to create coffin. Sometimes, bodies are merely placed in the empty cave or under the house, so that they could prevent stray dogs digging out the graveyard. It is a unique custom of Subanu to place Chinese jars containing offerings or food with the dead body, so that the afterlife journey of the dead will be successful. For the highly respected members of the community, two people (one being Balian) chant Geloy (funeral song) during Gukas (ritual ceremony to special people). Just like mass, this ritual ceremony is accompanied by food and wine called Pangasi offered to the dead.

==== B'laan ====
B'laan tribe is probably the most popular Mindanao occupants of Mountain provinces for Hanging Coffins of Sagada. Even before the influence of Christianity, the elders feared being buried on the ground, since they wanted to reach heaven in their afterlife. Out of love and concern, the family would hang the coffins on the wall of the cave (such as Lumiang cave). However, this kind of burial procedure was similar to other fishing communities like Banton of Romblon. Another unique characteristic of this pre-colonial burial custom contains the tradition of inserting jars in the coffin. This was similar to the Manunggul jar discovered in Tabon cave, Palawan, making the custom pre-existing even before the pre-colonial era. For B'laan people, trees served as a zone of final rest, which is a unique pattern for most of the Mindanao tribes' burial custom as well.

==== Davao ====
The Davao people are mostly known for placing objects in the coffin of the person, such as cutting rosaries and placing them in the hands of the deceased person and placing a chick in the coffin during the wake. The Davao people also have other superstitions such as preventing teardrops from touching the coffin, breaking plates before taking the coffin out of any edifice, making children walk under the coffin before its put into a hearse, and smoking feet when the coffin is leaving the burial ground from burning dried leaves.

== Influenced practices ==
=== Spanish influence ===
Indigenous Filipinos had burial practices that predated the Spanish occupancy of the Philippines. While these customary practices would persist through the Spanish occupation, burial customs would become highly influenced by the Spanish in the areas surrounding large trade cities and the capital. These influences include the location of the burials, position of the body, and the decoration of burial goods.

Pre-Hispanic Filipinos held their funeral rights in high regard, as most tribes believed that if the funeral process was not accomplished properly, the dead would return to the land of the living. The Spanish also held care for the deceased in high regard, although not for the same reasons as the indigenous Filipinos. This similarity served as a starting point to slowly infuse Catholic culture into the burial practices of the native Filipinos. One of the areas where the Spanish government immediately took action was the banning of crematory practices. This was due to the fact that "cremations were banned by the Catholic Church as it is against the belief that the dead will be resurrected by the second coming of Christ, which required the body to be intact." This idea of resurrection would not be taken well by the Filipinos at that time however, and as a result the Spanish enlisted the help of Jesuits to attempt and convert Filipinos to Catholicism. This was accompanied by the fact that the conversions had to be supplemented by reassurance that this resurrection was by no means evil. With the slow spread of Catholic beliefs and practices, there was much more uniformity with regard to burials in the areas that had been affected by the Spanish influence. These new standard of burials were then subject to the criterion and requirements set by the Roman Catholic Church.

Traditional burial locations of indigenous Filipinos included beneath or within houses or inside rock and cave shelters. This allowed them to feel that the dead were still in some way part of the community. By the beginning of the nineteenth century, the creation of cemeteries apart from the central church would become widespread, mainly due to cholera epidemics and public health.

=== American influence ===
After the three-century rule of the Spaniards in the Philippines, came the American occupation. American culture and influence started to find a place in a Philippine context by using various mediums, specifically the use of free trade. In this trading for and with the American market, a co-dependence between America and the Philippines was established. Another medium of cultural assimilation from America was their implementation of their education system during the first decade of their occupation, all in which showing more prevalent effects in the political and cultural development of the Filipinos. With the then-new educational system, young Filipinos were taught different American cultural devices such as their songs, values and ideals, and their subsequent assimilation of many of their traditions. All these factors brought about by America allowed for a heterogeneous assimilation between the two distinct cultures that resulted in a unique outcome of specific American influence forming a distinct Filipino image. From here, this is a rich source to understand the nation in its present situation and its historical context.

In relation to burial practices, the Philippine culture has borrowed heavily from the Americans. In the Philippine wake for example, also known as a lamay, it is tradition that the family and friends hold the body of the deceased in a casket for 5 to 7 days for viewing; this is patterned from the visitation practiced in American wakes, in which they host the deceased's body clothed and treated with various cosmetics in a funeral home for display and presentability. Both cultures adapting to a similar execution of ritual grief. Another turning point courtesy of the American influence is the practice of cremation. Drawing heavily from the Catholic faith, many Filipinos do not practice cremation as they believe that the body must remain intact in order to fulfill and prepare for the resurrection of the dead. Filipinos claimed that cremation must not be observed due to the Catholic church banning this practice, however as early as 1963 the ban was lifted and this point was emphasized in the 1983 revised Canon Law. Cremation remains mostly taboo from a domestic cultural standpoint.

=== Chinese influence ===
Chinese-Filipino funeral and burial customs mainly depend on the religion of the family of the deceased. There is a mix of religions, such as Taoisim, Buddhist, Catholic, Born-Again Christian, within the Chinese-Filipino sector of the Philippines. This is mainly due to the fact that initial Chinese settlers in the country were Taoist/Buddhist, while their children and grandchildren would incorporate the mainstream religion of the country because of their Filipino-based education and exposure. Therefore, most Chinese-Filipino funeral practices are a mix of the fundamental funeral practices of such religions stated above.

Chinese-Filipino families, casually called Tsinoys, practice a number of rituals whenever a loved one passes away. Most of these practices are derived from Chinese tradition and Taoist/Buddhism with a slight incorporation of other religions. Traditional Chinese practices involve the burning of paper versions of material goods such as houses, cars, helicopters, yachts, and money, so that the deceased will be able to enjoy such in the afterlife. Loved ones are not also allowed to cut their locks for forty days and are encouraged to wear white from head to toe. The idea of color representation exists in both cultures and not only encourages the use of white, but also black, the more-known color associated with funerals and death. The Buddhism aspect that is combined with these customs would be the burning of the incense and the offering of fruits as a sign of respect to the dead. The factor of other religions highly depends on the religion of the deceased and his/her loved one. If he/she is a Catholic/Protestant, then there would be a mass/sermon held during his/her funeral.

Certain Chinese items were found in several Filipino burials and were often a symbol of hierarchy and status. Status was often linked to objects that were found in burials. The elite, also known as datu and catalonan, were often found with foreign objects, such as the Chinese porcelain, that required a higher degree of technicality and skill. In elite burials, it can also be denoted that the amount of prestige goods and their placement were markers that not only suggested social classification, but an undeniable transoceanic trade partnership between the Filipino and Chinese people. It can be accounted that some sort of relationship existed and immersion/inclusion of each other's culture was a factor that could not be avoided.

== Other practices ==
Superstitious beliefs surrounding death entail the sudden appearance of certain animals, particularly those that are black in color. For example, the appearance of a lingering black butterfly around an individual is an omen, that a person's next of kin has died. Another example is a sick person heading toward the hospital, and sees a black-hued cat. This person will not survive their condition. Furthermore, seeing an owl near the home of a sick individual signifies the infirm's imminent death.

Other beliefs pertaining to death are related to dreams, dining etiquette, odors, unusual shapes of certain objects, children, and odd numbers. Examples of these types are: not allowing family members to leave the home until used utensils have been cleansed (it is believed a family member may pass away if this habit is not followed), consuming sour fruit in the evenings (to avoid early parental demise), avoiding taking photographs of three persons together (to avoid the early death of the individual placed in the middle), sudden scent of a burning candle – without a lit candle anywhere – hints that a relative just died, losing a tooth during a dream is an omen that a relative will soon die, a headless shadow of an individual forewarns that that person will pass away soon, preventing all family members from viewing the face of a dead person at funerals (to prevent the ghost of the departed from visiting the family resulting in the death of every family member), and lifting children related to the deceased over caskets before the entombment (to hinder the ghost of the dead relative from visiting the children).

Another superstitious ritual is pagpag (lit. 'act of shaking off dust or dirt'), where wake visitors would not directly go to their residences to confuse the spirit of the dead. A common stopover would be convenience stores and shopping malls.

== Burial ornamentation ==
Objects found alongside a burial are indicative of status and power. These objects are also referred to as grave goods, and they are representative of the complexity that existed in the societies, and the social identities among groups as well as individuals. Items of prestige in the Philippines were put into various groups such as, unusual materials/non-local materials/rare materials, trade materials, items that certain people had access to, and non-utilitarian objects. Stones, shells, gold, silk, bones (human and animal), bracelets and beads are a few examples of ornaments that held great prestige in the Philippines. For example, gold was a rare non-local material object that not many people in the Philippines had access to; therefore, granting people with gold, an elite status. Barretto-Tesoro created a measuring technique for assigning grave goods with prestige value. The three methods that are further described are used for assessing grave good assemblages in correlation to its prestige value, and are all indicative of a wealthier individual. The more objects found in a grave, the more variety of artifacts in a grave, and lastly the lower frequency of objects in assemblage of grave goods, all indicate a wealthy individual. It is also important to note that not all objects carried the same value between various cultures. The prestige that was assigned to a grave good was variable depending on the culture it belonged to; therefore, something that was highly valuable to one culture could mean nothing to another culture.

=== Timeline ===
There were three significant time periods that exposed grave goods, and their value to the Philippine culture. The early Neolithic age relied heavily on utilitarian objects and was dominated by the shell adze, which was found among many of the burial sites. Next, during the late Neolithic age, trade had already been established, and the burials were dominated by earthenware pottery. Lastly, the Metal Age arrived, which was dominated by iron objects such as coins, metal, etc.

=== Children and burial objects ===
It was very rare for children to be buried with objects in the Philippines because status was achieved through one's lifetime; children are too young to have earned any power or status. There are rare cases where prestige items are in fact found in a child's burial, and this indicates ascribed status through family ties.

== Gallery ==
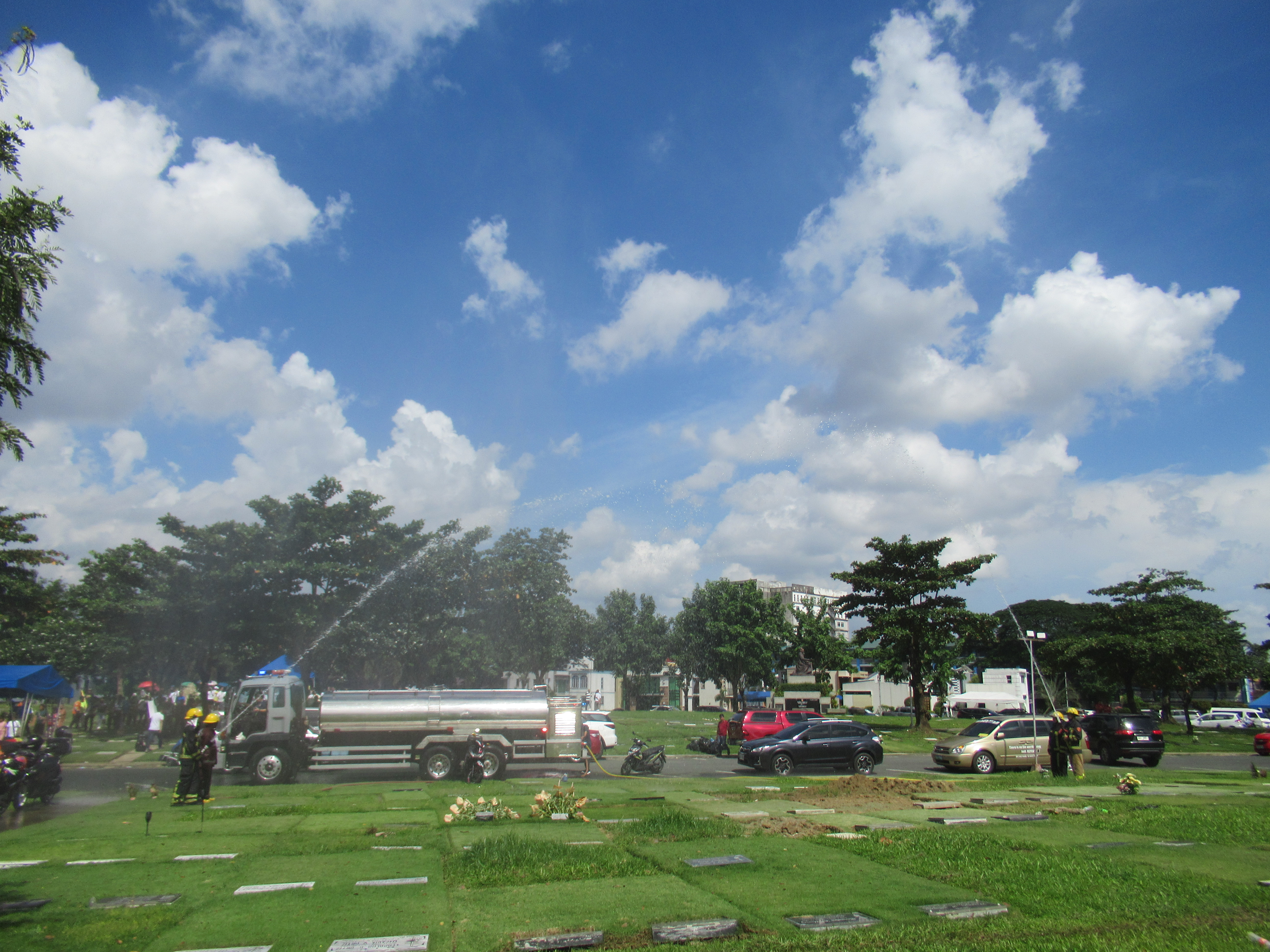
Water cannon salutes in Philippine funerals

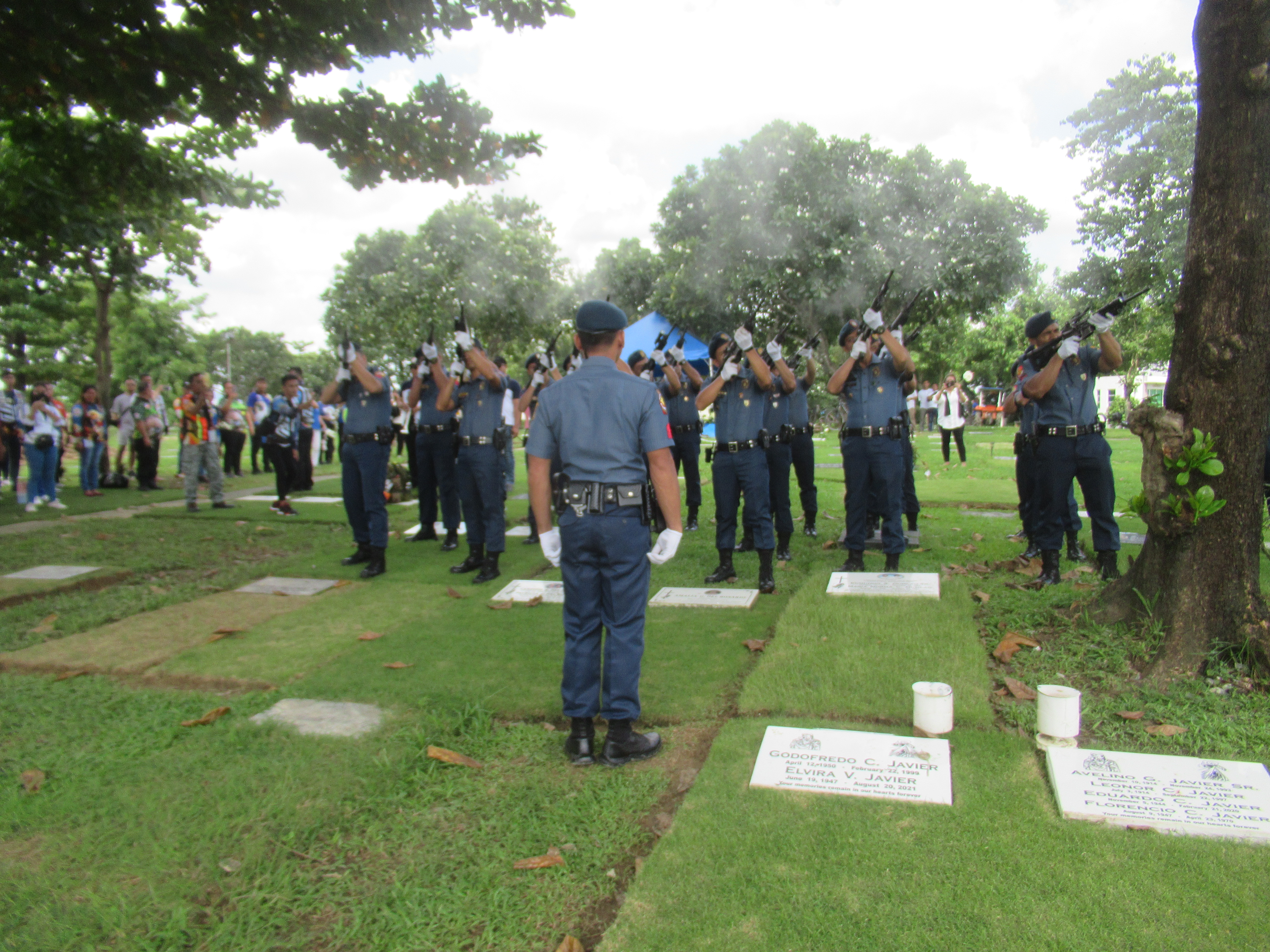
Gun salute in funerals

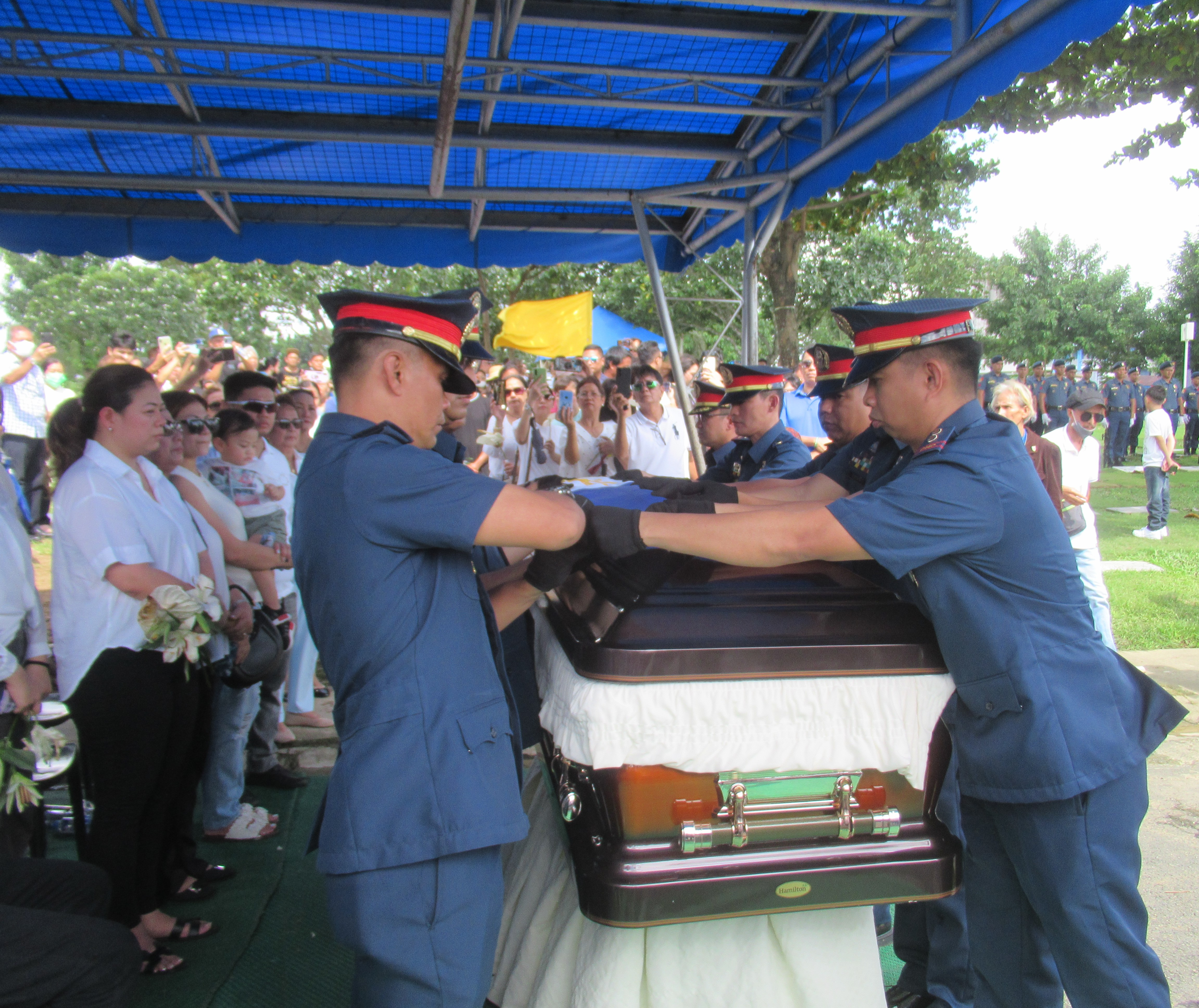
Flag folding
