= Sedarat =

- Location within Borneo
- Coordinates: 1.18333°N 111.63333°E
- Country: Malaysia
- State: Sarawak
- Elevation: 99 m (325 ft)

Sedarat is a settlement in Sarawak, Malaysia. It lies approximately 151.3 kilometres (94 mi) east-south-east of the state capital Kuching. Neighbouring settlements include:

- Pungkung 1.9 kilometres (1.2 mi) west
- Empelam 3.7 kilometres (2.3 mi) west
- Geligau 3.7 kilometres (2.3 mi) west
- Setugak 3.7 kilometres (2.3 mi) south
- Sepalau 4.1 kilometres (2.5 mi) northwest
- Setengin 4.1 kilometres (2.5 mi) northeast
- Selalau 4.1 kilometres (2.5 mi) northeast
- Nanga Meriu 5.2 kilometres (3.2 mi) southeast
- Engkilili 5.4 kilometres (3.4 mi) southeast
