= Marup =

- Location within Borneo
- Coordinates: 1.13333°N 111.65°E
- Country: Malaysia
- State: Sarawak
- Elevation: 71 m (233 ft)

Marup is a settlement in Sarawak, Malaysia. It lies approximately 154.8 kilometres (96.2 mi) east-south-east of the state capital Kuching. Neighbouring settlements include:

- Bukong 1.9 kilometres (1.2 mi) south
- Munggu Tajau 1.9 kilometres (1.2 mi) east
- Sungai Meniang 1.9 kilometres (1.2 mi) east
- Selindong 1.9 kilometres (1.2 mi) east
- Engkilili 2.4 kilometres (1.5 mi) northeast
