= Sepalau =

- Location within Borneo
- Coordinates: 1.2°N 111.6°E
- Country: Malaysia
- State: Sarawak
- Elevation: 111 m (364 ft)

Sepalau (also known as Spalau) is a settlement in Sarawak, Malaysia. It lies approximately 147.2 kilometres (91 mi) east-south-east of the state capital Kuching. Neighbouring settlements include:

- Basi 1.9 kilometres (1.2 mi) west
- Geligau 1.9 kilometres (1.2 mi) south
- Ensurai 2.6 kilometres (1.6 mi) southwest
- Pungkung 2.6 kilometres (1.6 mi) southeast
- Sedarat 4.1 kilometres (2.5 mi) southeast
- Tekalong 5.6 kilometres (3.5 mi) west
- Selalau 5.9 kilometres (3.7 mi) east
- Tabut 5.9 kilometres (3.7 mi) north
- Tembong 6.7 kilometres (4.2 mi) northwest
