= Setengin =

- Location within Borneo
- Coordinates: 1.2°N 111.66667°E
- Country: Malaysia
- State: Sarawak
- Elevation: 80 m (260 ft)

Setengin (also known as Stengin) is a settlement in Sarawak, Malaysia. It lies approximately 154.4 kilometres (96 mi) east-south-east of the state capital Kuching. Neighbouring settlements include:

- Nanga Semueh – 2.6 kilometres (1.6 mi) northeast
- Selalau – 2.6 kilometres (1.6 mi) northwest
- Nanga Lemanak – 3.7 kilometres (2.3 mi) south
- Sedarat – 4.1 kilometres (2.5 mi) southwest
- Nanga Meriu – 5.6 kilometres (3.5 mi) south
- Pungkung – 5.9 kilometres (3.7 mi) west
- Ili Titok – 5.9 kilometres (3.7 mi) north
- Engkilili – 5.9 kilometres (3.7 mi) south
