= Three-course tea (Bai people) =

Traditional tea ceremony of the Bai people

Three-Course Tea (Chinese: 白族三道茶) is a traditional tea ceremony practiced by the Bai people in Dali City, Yunnan Province, China. The ceremony comprises three distinct stages: "bitter tea," "sweet tea," and "aftertaste tea." It is believed to have originated during the Nanzhao Kingdom period as a palace ritual, later adopted by Buddhist temples, and eventually becoming a widespread ceremonial practice. In recent decades, the tea ceremony has also become a signature cultural performance in Dali tourism.

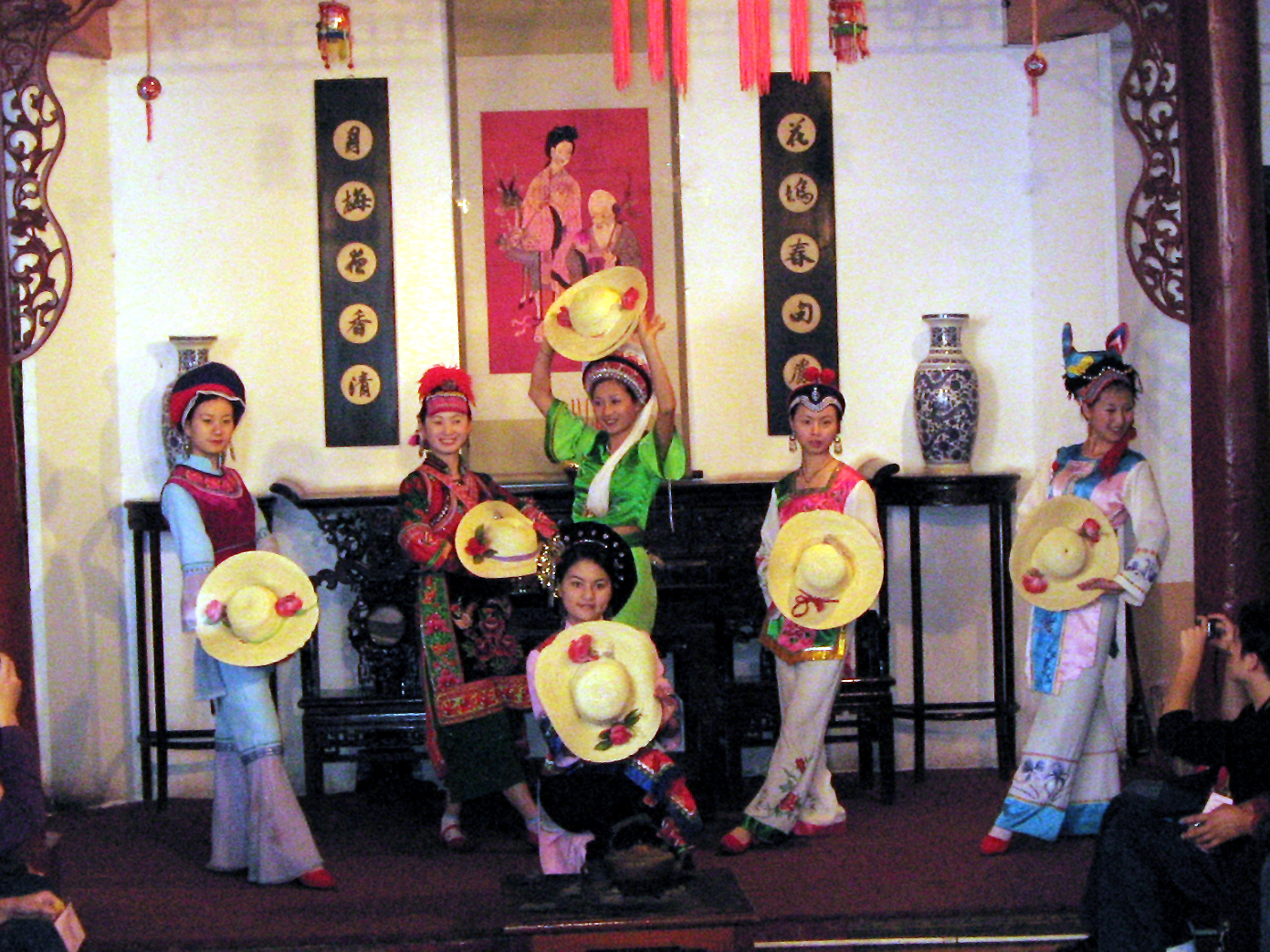
Bai people' in Dali, Yunnan.

== History ==
The Bai three-course tea originated during the Tang Dynasty. At that time, the Bai people in the Nanzhao Kingdom had the custom of drinking tea. Especially during major sacrificial ceremonies, victorious battles, receptions for state guests, and grand events such as royal tours by the King of Nanzhao, they would hold a "three-course tea song and dance banquet." During the Tianbao period of the Tang Dynasty, Zheng Hui, the Jiedushi (military governor) of the Southwest, was dispatched on a diplomatic mission to Nanzhao. The King of Nanzhao received him with a lavish "three-course tea song and dance banquet."

To strengthen his body and prolong his life, the Nanzhao King drank three-course tea every morning. In the mid-Nanzhao period, the custom began to spread from the royal court to wealthy families among the common people. Initially, it was reserved for elders at 60th birthday celebrations as a blessing for longevity. It was later adopted in wedding ceremonies as well.

A legend tells the origin of the three cups of tea. Long ago, at the foot of Cangshan Mountain in Dali, there lived an old carpenter. One day, he said to his apprentice: "If you can saw down a large tree, cut it into boards, and carry them home in one breath, you will become a master." The apprentice found a big tree and began sawing, but before he could finish turning it into boards, he became extremely thirsty. He grabbed a handful of leaves and chewed them to quench his thirst. By sunset, he had finished the boards, but he was utterly exhausted. At that moment, the master handed him a small bag of brown sugar and smiled: "This is called bitter first, sweet later." After eating it, the apprentice regained his strength and carried the boards home in one breath. Thereafter, the master allowed him to become a master himself. Before they parted ways, the master scooped a bowl of tea, added honey and pepper leaves, and invited the apprentice to drink. He then asked: "Is this tea bitter or sweet?" The apprentice replied: "Sweet, bitter, numbing, spicy—it's full of all kinds of flavors." The master nodded and said: "This tea reflects the same principle as learning a craft or living life. You must endure bitterness before enjoying sweetness, and everything must be savored deeply." Since then, the Bai people's three-course tea has become a customary rite for apprentices learning a skill or students pursuing knowledge. Over time, its scope of use expanded and it became a broader cultural custom of the Bai people.

By the Song and Yuan dynasties, the three-course tea had become a common custom among the Bai people to welcome guests from afar. Over time, the preparation method of the tea evolved into a standardized ritual.

== Procedure and cultural meaning ==
The Bai people's Three-Course Tea consists of three distinct stages: the first course of bitter tea, the second course of sweet tea, and the third course of aftertaste tea. This traditional tea ceremony is summed up in the phrase: “one bitter, two sweet, three aftertaste”, which encapsulates the Bai people's philosophy of life — enduring hardship, enjoying success, and reflecting on the journey.

=== First course: bitter tea ===
The tea leaves, typically sun-dried green tea, are roasted in a sand-fired clay pot and stirred continuously until the tender stems start to foam. Boiling water is then added, producing a distinctive crackling sound known as “thunder tea.” Once the bubbling subsides, the tea is poured into cups, typically filled only to about 80% capacity to avoid overfilling. The server traditionally raises the cup to eyebrow level before serving, as a sign of deep respect and hospitality.

This tea features a bright amber color and a slightly bitter yet mellow flavor. It is believed to stimulate salivation, quench thirst, and refresh the mind. Symbolically, it reflects the idea that one must endure bitterness and hardship at the beginning of life before achieving fulfillment.

=== Second course: sweet tea ===
Building upon the roasted tea base, ingredients such as Rushan cheese (milk fan), walnut kernels, sesame seeds, and brown sugar are added. The mixture is gently stirred after being poured into the cup, producing a fragrant, caramel-colored tea with a rich and sweet taste.

This course symbolizes the sweetness of life that follows perseverance — a happy and fulfilling life that comes as a reward for hard work and resilience.

=== Third course: aftertaste tea ===
The final brew includes cinnamon powder, Sichuan pepper, minced ginger, honey, and brown sugar, added into the cup before hot tea is poured in. After gentle stirring, the resulting tea displays a golden hue and offers a complex flavor profile — combining sweetness with subtle spiciness and a lingering aftertaste.

This course represents the reflective phase of life and career. It encourages people to savor their experiences, learn from the past, and pursue continuous personal growth.

== Cultural characteristics ==
The Bai ethnic group's three-course tea, also known simply as three-course tea, is a traditional tea ceremony practiced by the Bai people of Yunnan to honor distinguished guests. It is an important part of Bai tea culture. Characterized by its distinctive sequence—“first bitter, second sweet, third aftertaste”—this tea ritual became a formal expression of hospitality and friendship among the Bai as early as the Ming Dynasty. Traditionally, the tea was served by the elders of a family or clan; however, in contemporary practice, younger generations also serve tea to their elders. Each course of the three-course tea involves a different preparation method and distinct ingredients.

The preparation of the Bai three-course tea follows strict requirements, typically involving three courses, six rules, and eighteen sequences. The “three courses” refer to the well-known progression: the first course is bitter, the second is sweet, and the third leaves a lingering aftertaste. The “six rules” are guiding principles observed during the brewing process: selecting premium tea leaves, roasting at each stage, boiling water in a copper kettle, using charcoal as fuel, roasting tea in a sand pot, and incorporating specific seasonings. The “eighteen sequences” outline the step-by-step procedure from preparation to tasting, including: seating of host and guest, exchanging greetings, offering snacks, admiring the tea leaves, careful roasting, preparing seasonings, boiling water, brewing in stages, warming cups, pouring tea into individual cups, serving guests in order, demonstrating mutual respect, observing the tea’s color, appreciating its aroma, tasting its flavor, discussing the art of tea, offering blessings, and bowing to express gratitude.

== Cultural significance ==
Traditionally, the Bai People's Three-Course Tea is served during important celebrations such as the Lunar New Year, birthdays, weddings, and apprenticeship ceremonies.

Since the 1980s, with the growth of tourism in Dali, this tea ceremony has been incorporated into cultural performances featuring traditional Bai music and dance, transforming it into a popular cultural experience for visitors. In response to its rising prominence, the local government introduced the Service Standards for Bai People's Three-Course Tea, which standardizes key aspects of the ceremony, including the preparation process, performance elements, and service etiquette.

== Social impact ==
On November 11, 2003, the Bai nationality three-course tea won the championship at the first tea culture and art festival in Wuyi Mountain, China.

In November 2019, the "List of National Intangible Cultural Heritage Representative Project Protection Units" was announced, and the Dali City Intangible Cultural Heritage Protection and Management Office was qualified as a protection unit for the "Tea Customs (Bai Nationality Three-course Tea)" project.
