= Pungkung =

- Location within Borneo
- Coordinates: 1.18333°N 111.61667°E
- Country: Malaysia
- State: Sarawak
- Elevation: 100 m (330 ft)

Pungkung (also known as Pungkang) is a settlement in Sarawak, Malaysia. It lies approximately 149.6 kilometres (93 mi) east-south-east of the state capital Kuching. Neighbouring settlements include:

- Sedarat 1.9 kilometres (1.2 mi) east
- Geligau 1.9 kilometres (1.2 mi) west
- Empelam 1.9 kilometres (1.2 mi) west
- Sepalau 2.6 kilometres (1.6 mi) northwest
- Ensurai 3.7 kilometres (2.3 mi) west
- Setugak 4.1 kilometres (2.5 mi) southeast
- Basi 4.1 kilometres (2.5 mi) northwest
- Selalau 5.2 kilometres (3.2 mi) northeast
- Setengin 5.9 kilometres (3.7 mi) east
