= Geligau =

- Location within Borneo
- Coordinates: 1.18333°N 111.6°E
- Country: Malaysia
- State: Sarawak
- Elevation: 97 m (318 ft)

Geligau is a settlement in Sarawak, Malaysia. It lies approximately 147.8 kilometres (92 mi) east-south-east of the state capital Kuching. Neighbouring settlements include:

- Empelam 0 kilometres (0.0 mi) north
- Ensurai 1.9 kilometres (1.2 mi) west
- Pungkung 1.9 kilometres (1.2 mi) east
- Sepalau 1.9 kilometres (1.2 mi) north
- Basi 2.6 kilometres (1.6 mi) northwest
- Sedarat 3.7 kilometres (2.3 mi) east
- Setugak 5.2 kilometres (3.2 mi) southeast
- Tekalong 5.9 kilometres (3.7 mi) west
