= Selindong =

- Location within Borneo
- Coordinates: 1.13333°N 111.66667°E
- Country: Malaysia
- State: Sarawak
- Elevation: 100 m (330 ft)

Selindong is a settlement in Sarawak, Malaysia. It lies approximately 156.6 kilometres (97.3 mi) east-south-east of the state capital Kuching. Neighbouring settlements include:

- Munggu Tajau 0 kilometres (0.0 mi) north
- Sungai Meniang 0 kilometres (0.0 mi) north
- Engkilili 1.5 kilometres (0.9 mi) north
- Marup 1.9 kilometres (1.2 mi) west
- Nanga Meriu 1.9 kilometres (1.2 mi) north
