= Pepper tree =

Pepper tree is a common name for several trees, including:

- Those in the genus Schinus
- Piper excelsum, or kawakawa, small and endemic to New Zealand
- Two species of the genus Pseudowintera, also known by their Māori name, Horopito

== Other ==
- Pepper Tree (band), a 1970s Canadian rock band

== See also ==
- Pepper leaf (disambiguation)
