= Merunjau =

- Location within Borneo
- Coordinates: 1.46667°N 111.65°E
- Country: Malaysia
- State: Sarawak
- Elevation: 207 m (679 ft)

Merunjau is a settlement in Betong, Sarawak, Malaysia. It lies approximately 147.1 kilometres (91.4 mi) east of the state capital Kuching. Neighbouring settlements include:

- Sengkalat 0 kilometres (0.0 mi) north
- Sanggau 1.9 kilometres (1.2 mi) north
- Ajong 2.6 kilometres (1.6 mi) southwest
- Nanga Kron 2.6 kilometres (1.6 mi) southwest
- Nanga Tapih 3.7 kilometres (2.3 mi) north
