= Tembong =

- Location within Borneo
- Coordinates: 1.25°N 111.56667°E
- Country: Malaysia
- State: Sarawak
- Elevation: 72 m (236 ft)

Tembong is a settlement in Sarawak, Malaysia. It lies approximately 142.1 kilometres (88 mi) east-south-east of the state capital Kuching. Neighbouring settlements include:

- Tabut 1.9 kilometres (1.2 mi) east
- Kejemut 2.6 kilometres (1.6 mi) northwest
- Lidong 5.2 kilometres (3.2 mi) northwest
- Ijok Ulu 5.2 kilometres (3.2 mi) southwest
- Kaong 5.9 kilometres (3.7 mi) west
- Rambai 5.9 kilometres (3.7 mi) west
- Tebarong 5.9 kilometres (3.7 mi) east
- Sengkabang 5.9 kilometres (3.7 mi) west
- Basi 5.9 kilometres (3.7 mi) south
