= Selalau =

- Location within Borneo
- Coordinates: 1.21667°N 111.65°E
- Country: Malaysia
- State: Sarawak
- Elevation: 100 m (330 ft)

Selalau is a settlement in Sarawak, Malaysia. It lies approximately 152.1 kilometres (95 mi) east-south-east of the state capital Kuching. Neighbouring settlements include the following:

- Setengin 2.6 kilometres (1.6 mi) southeast
- Sedarat 4.1 kilometres (2.5 mi) southwest
- Ili Titok 5.2 kilometres (3.2 mi) northeast
- Pungkung 5.2 kilometres (3.2 mi) southwest
- Sepelu 5.6 kilometres (3.5 mi) east
- Sepalau 5.9 kilometres (3.7 mi) west
- Tebarong 6.7 kilometres (4.2 mi) northwest
