= Gawis =

- Location within Borneo
- Coordinates: 1.43333°N 111.61667°E
- Country: Malaysia
- State: Sarawak
- Elevation: 168 m (551 ft)

Gawis is a settlement in Sarawak, Malaysia. It lies approximately 143.7 kilometres (89.3 mi) east of the state capital Kuching. Neighbouring settlements include:

- Buai Malanjam 0 kilometres (0.0 mi) north
- Nanga Buai 0 kilometres (0.0 mi) north
- Buai Balingam 1.9 kilometres (1.2 mi) south
- Ajong 2.6 kilometres (1.6 mi) northeast
- Nanga Kron 2.6 kilometres (1.6 mi) northeast
