= Java plum =

Java plum is a common name for the edible fruits of several tropical tree species, and may refer to:

- Syzygium cumini, native to India and southeast Asia
- Spondias mombin, native to the tropical Americas
