= Nanga Meriu =

- Location within Borneo
- Coordinates: 1.15°N 111.66667°E
- Country: Malaysia
- State: Sarawak
- Elevation: 115 m (377 ft)

Nanga Meriu is a settlement in Sarawak, Malaysia. It lies approximately 156 kilometres (96.9 mi) east-south-east of the state capital Kuching. Neighbouring settlements include:

- Engkilili 0.3 kilometres (0.2 mi) south
- Selindong 1.9 kilometres (1.2 mi) south
- Munggu Tajau 1.9 kilometres (1.2 mi) south
- Nanga Lemanak 1.9 kilometres (1.2 mi) north
- Sungai Meniang 1.9 kilometres (1.2 mi) south
