= Atang (food offering) =

Filipino food offering

Atang is an indigenous food-offering ritual for the dead and for spirits practiced among several ethnolinguistic groups in northern Luzon, particularly among the Ilocano people and Cordilleran (Igorot) peoples in the Philippines. It forms part of the traditional cultural and religious practices of these groups, rooted in beliefs surrounding the presence of anitos (spirits) in the human world. Átang is generally performed to honor the presence of spirits and the dead, seek their guidance, and appease or ward off malevolent spirits.

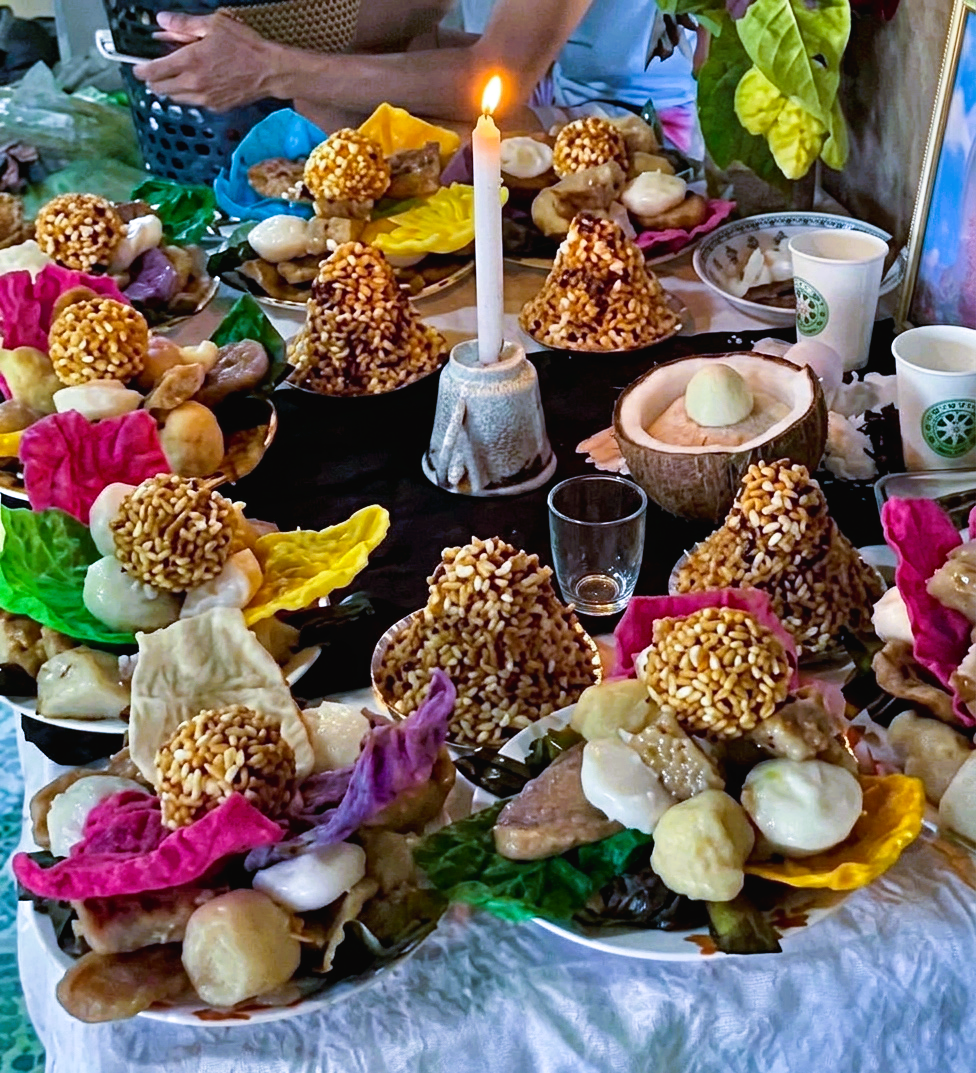
Umras, a form of átang often observed on the 30th or 40th day, and the first death anniversary, with offerings including busi (puffed rice), pilais (rice crisps), traditional rice cakes, coconut, egg, and rice.

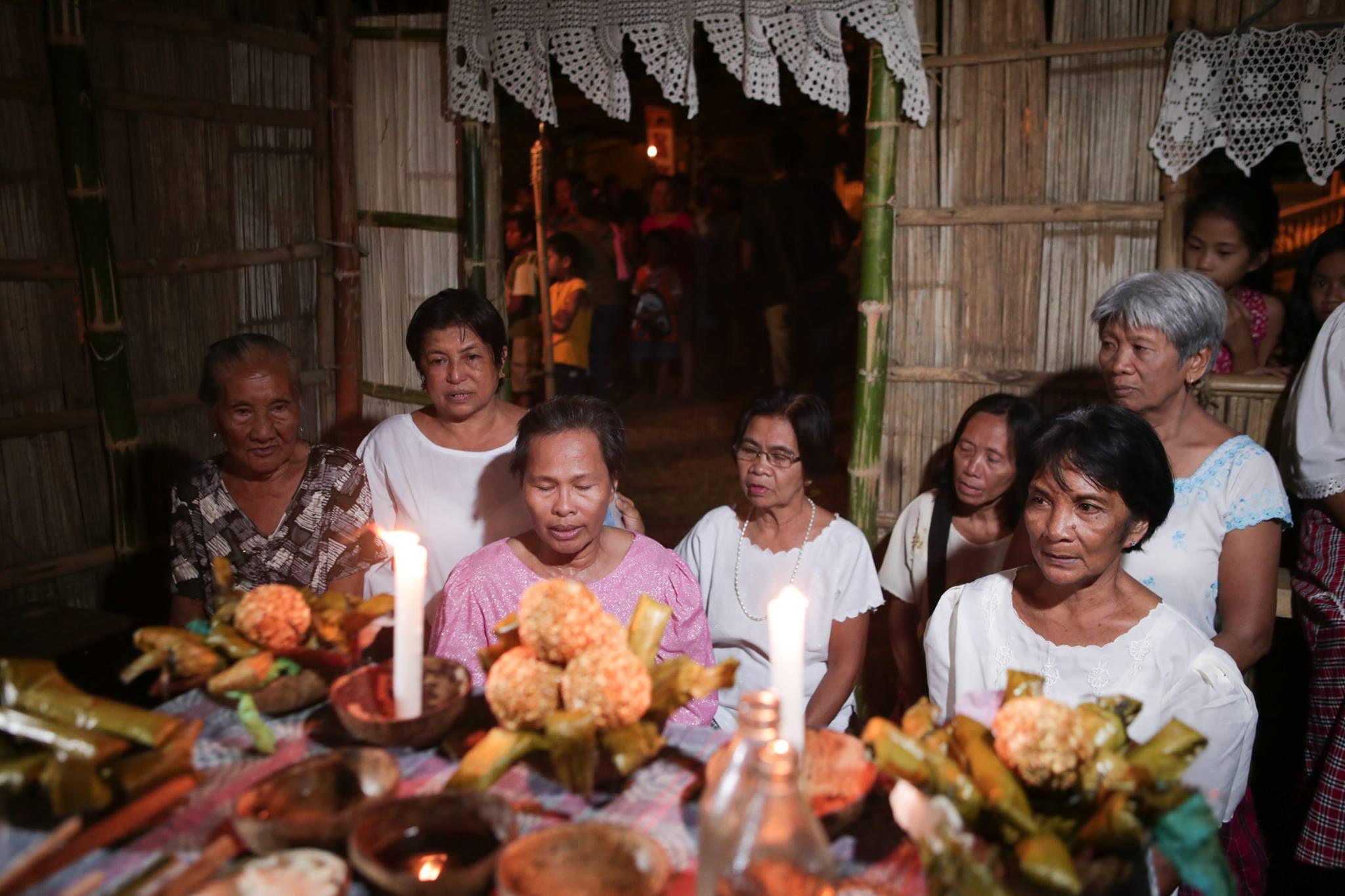
Tumba-tumba, a traditional practice of honoring the dead during All Saints' Day in Paoay, Ilocos Norte, featuring átang (food offerings).

The ritual is commonly observed during wakes and funerals, as well as on specific post-death commemorations, such as the 30th or 40th day and the first death anniversary, usually performed in the afternoon of the interment, a practice referred to as umras, and during occasions like All Saints' Day. It may also be conducted to prevent or drive away illness believed to be caused by displeased spirits. In Cagayan, it is known as tunnak. Similar practices of offerin g food to the dead exist in other Philippine cultures, such as alay among Tagalogs and halad among Cebuanos.

== Description ==
The most common ritual forms of átang take place before, during, and after the wake (pumpón) of the deceased; on death anniversaries (babang-luksa); and in cases of illness attributed to unknown phenomena or dreams interpreted as bad omens.

Rituals for Healing and Illness

In instances of illness (naam-amlingán), átang is typically conducted by the baglán or mangngágas (indigenous or spiritual healer) who chants prayers to appease the spirits or otherworldly entities believed to have caused the ailment. The átang, or food offering, is placed on a table or dúlang (a low table) and may also be positioned on platforms called simbáan or in caves, trees, and forests where spirits are thought to reside. Traditionally, the átang is placed in the sarukang, a bamboo pole sliced into sticks on one side and tied with ropes to form a flower-like structure to hold the food offering.

Influence of Catholicism

Influenced by Catholicism, Ilocanos often perform átang during major Christian celebrations such as Paskúa (Christmas) and Semana Santa (Holy Week). During Holy Week, átang is placed in front of a photograph of departed relatives and/or an image of Jesus, Mary, or the Holy Family, accompanied by prayers, dung-áw (dirges or lament songs), and novenas.

During Pista Natáy or Aldáw Dagiti Kararuá (Undas or All Saints' Day), átang is offered in cemeteries in front of graves or within homes for deceased relatives, often accompanied by their photographs. This act, known as dipunturong, refers to the practice of remembering the dead with special offerings to honor their memory.

In Paoay, Ilocos Norte, the tumba-tumbá celebration honors the dead, blending religious and cultural traditions. Observed on All Saints' Day (November 1) and All Souls' Day (November 2), families prepare by constructing and decorating a mallong or tumbá (platform), which symbolizes a shelter for the deceased. The tumbá is adorned with offerings such as átang, flowers, candles, and religious icons, accompanied by prayers or dung-áw. The word "tumbá" means "to fall," symbolizing "eternal rest," and the tradition is a key event in Ilocos Norte's Semana ti Ar-Aria (Ghost Week). Offerings like cigars, betel nut, and basi (local sugarcane wine) are arranged on a table covered with white linen. Elder women in baro't saya lead prayers and songs, creating a solemn atmosphere for the occasion.

Rituals in Celebrations and Gathering

Atáng may also be offered during events such as birthdays, weddings, baptisms, or other significant celebrations. During these occasions, atáng is typically performed by offering the same food served during the celebration. It is considered taboo to eat before performing the atáng. In drinking alcoholic beverages, the atáng ritual called pitik is also observed. This involves offering the first taste of the drink to spirits or deceased relatives before anyone else partakes. The ritual is performed by pouring a small amount of the wine into a separate glass or onto the ground, often accompanied by phrases such as "bagi yo, Apo" ("for you, Apo") or "bari-bari, Apo." The term "Apo" may refer to God, ancestors, or spirits. This offering symbolizes reverence and serves as a request for blessings, protection from harm, and avoidance of illness.This practice of offering food to the deceased is referred to as alay by the Tagalog and halad by the Cebuanos.

Rituals in House Constructions

The átang ritual is also observed during the construction of a house or the installation of a well or pump on newly acquired land. This practice aims to appease the spirits that may inhabit the area. In the context of house construction, the átang entails a ritual known as padára, which involves the symbolic shedding of chicken blood. A pair of chickens is slaughtered, and their blood is poured onto the construction site and the main columns of the house to invoke blessings from the spirits and ensure the structural stability of the house against potential disasters. In this ritual, the rooster (kawítan) is sacrificed first (mangurungor), followed by the hen (úpa). The blood of the chickens is then ceremonially applied (maipatedtéd) to all the house posts in a clockwise sequence. This ritual is believed to imbue the structure with strength and protection, enabling it to endure natural calamities such as typhoons, earthquakes, and tornadoes. Furthermore, it is thought to promote a smooth and harmonious construction process.

== Traditional Food Offerings ==
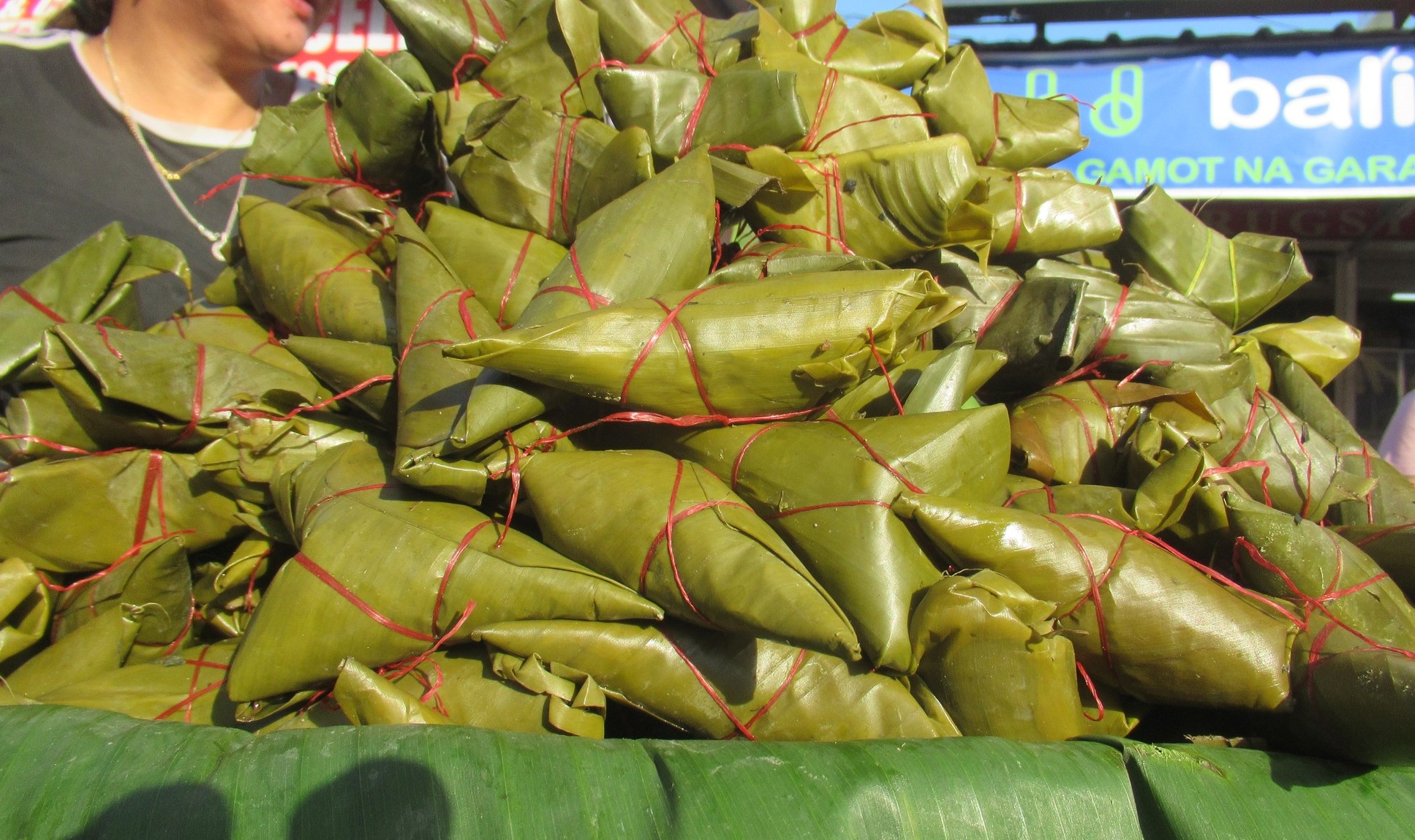
patópat or súman

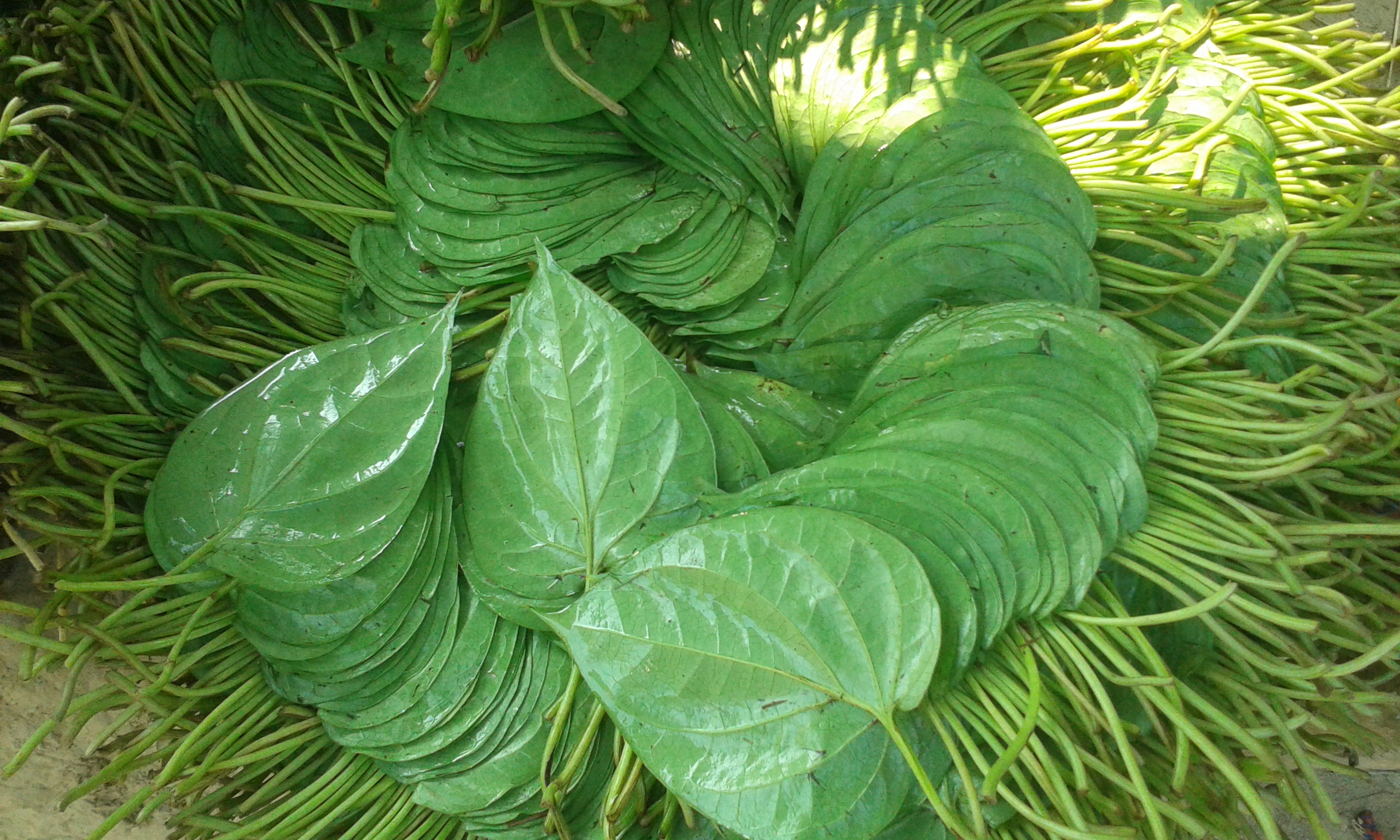
gawéd (betel pipper leaf)

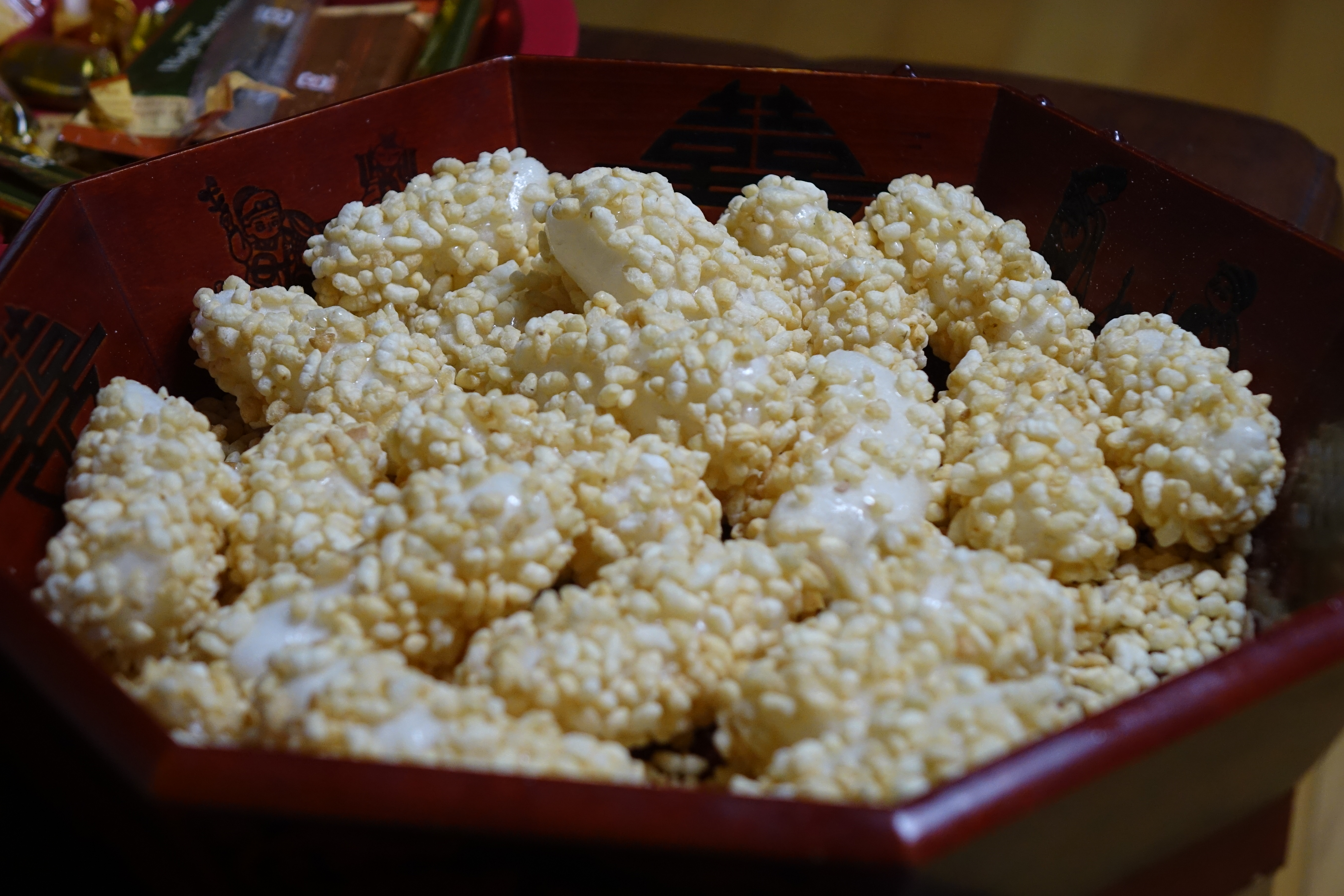
busí (popped rice)

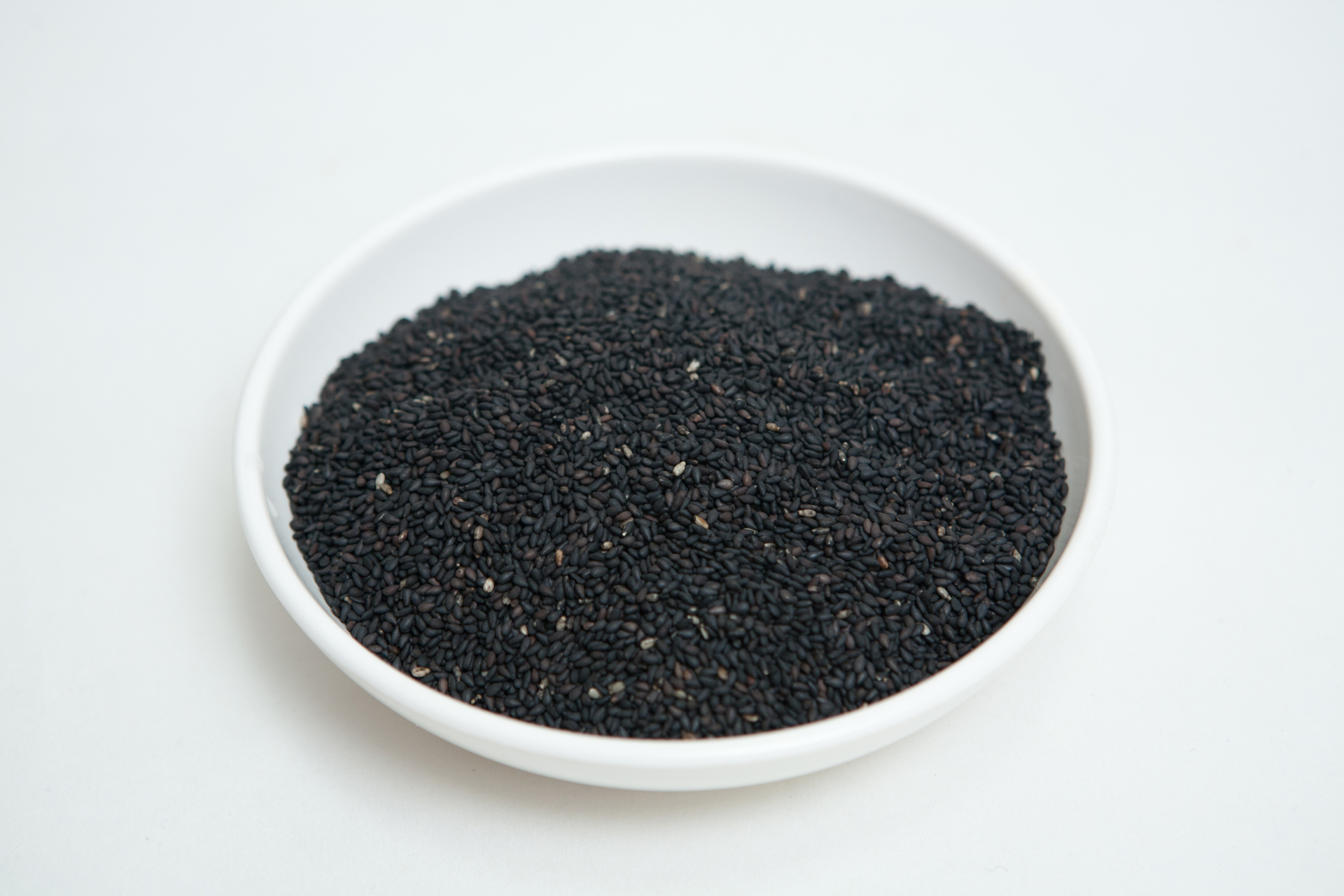
lingá (black sesame)

Traditionally, the plates of food prepared for átang include kankanén (sticky rice cakes) such as súman, dudúl, linapét, baduyá, patópat, or balisongsóng (snacks made from sticky rice or rice flour); busí (caramelized popped rice); lingá (black sesame seeds); sticky rice with coconut milk; and bagás (uncooked rice) shaped into a crucifix and topped with fresh eggs. The food offerings may also be accompanied by danúm (water), búa ken gawéd (betel nut and piper leaf), apóg (lime powder), basí (fermented sugarcane wine), and tabáko (tobacco) or pinádis (rolled tobacco).

== Cultural Significance ==
Ilocanos believe that the soul does not immediately depart from the world of the living during the wake and still requires sustenance, hence the offering of food as the soul transitions to the afterlife. Furthermore, it is believed that the soul returns to the living world after the nine-day wake and must be welcomed back. In cases where the deceased appears in dreams or a family member experiences an unexplainable illness, átang is performed as a ritual of appeasement for the deceased who may have been offended or disturbed. It is also interpreted as a means of seeking intercession from the deceased for their loved ones and expressing gratitude for warnings against bad omens received through dreams. Clearly, the significance of átang for the Ilocanos transcends the mere remembrance and honoring of deceased loved ones. It embodies their beliefs about life after death and the intricate relationship between the living and the departed.
