= Pepper leaf =

Pepper leaf is a common name for several plants and may refer to:

- Persicaria hydropiper
- Piper auritum, native to tropical Central America
- Piper lolot
- Tasmannia lanceolata, native to southeastern Australia

== See also ==
- Pepper tree
- Pepperweed
