= Engkilili =

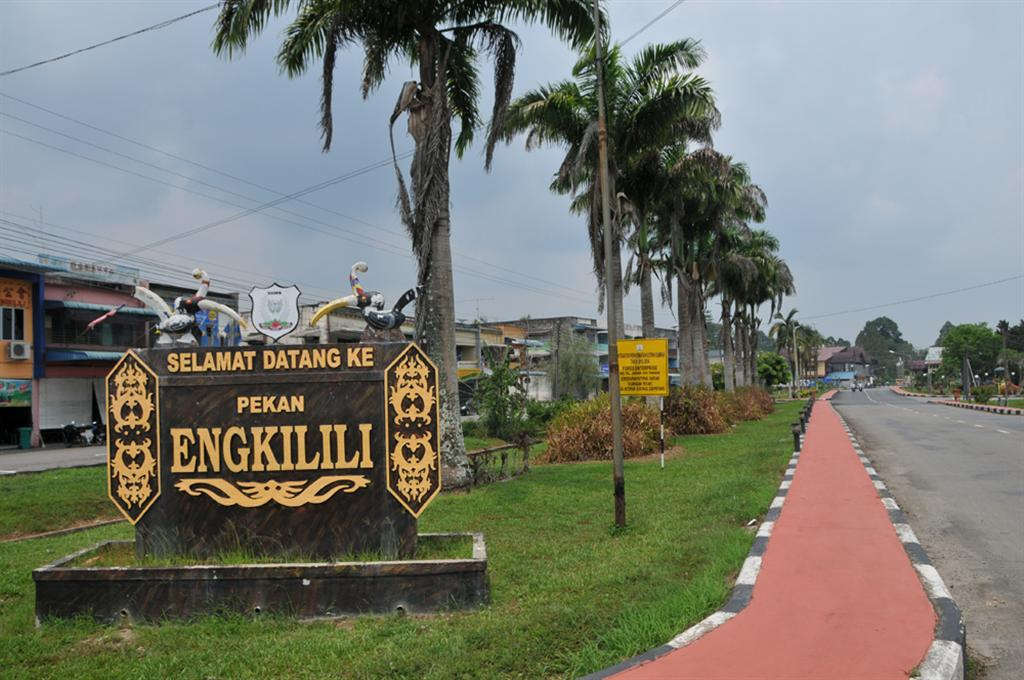

- Engkilili in Lubok Antu District

- Location within Borneo
- Coordinates: 1.14722°N 111.66639°E
- Country: Malaysia
- State: Sarawak
- Elevation: 109 m (358 ft)

Engkilili is a town in Lubok Antu District, Sri Aman Division, Sarawak, Malaysia. It lies approximately 156.1 kilometres (97.0 mi) east-south-east of the state capital Kuching. Neighbouring settlements include:

- Nanga Meriu 0.3 kilometres (0.2 mi) north
- Munggu Tajau 1.5 kilometres (0.9 mi) south
- Selindong 1.5 kilometres (0.9 mi) south
- Sungai Meniang 1.5 kilometres (0.9 mi) south
- Nanga Lemanak 2.2 kilometres (1.4 mi) north

== Education ==
=== Primary school ===
- Sekolah Kebangsaan Stengin/Sedarat
- Sekolah Kebangsaan Ng Menjuau
- Sekolah Kebangsaan Engkilili No 1

=== Secondary school ===
- Sekolah Menengah Kebangsaan Engkilili

== City administration ==
- Engkilili Development Corporation (Perbadanan Pembangunan Engkilili)
- Majlis Daerah Lubok Antu
