= Nanga Kron =

- Location within Borneo
- Coordinates: 1.45°N 111.63333°E
- Country: Malaysia
- State: Sarawak
- Elevation: 167 m (548 ft)

Nanga Kron is a settlement in Sarawak, Malaysia. It lies approximately 145.4 kilometres (90.3 mi) east of the state capital Kuching. Neighbouring settlements include:

- Ajong 0 kilometres (0.0 mi) north
- Gawis 2.6 kilometres (1.6 mi) southwest
- Buai Malanjam 2.6 kilometres (1.6 mi) southwest
- Nanga Buai 2.6 kilometres (1.6 mi) southwest
- Merunjau 2.6 kilometres (1.6 mi) northeast
