= Basi =

Fermented beverage made from sugarcane

Basí
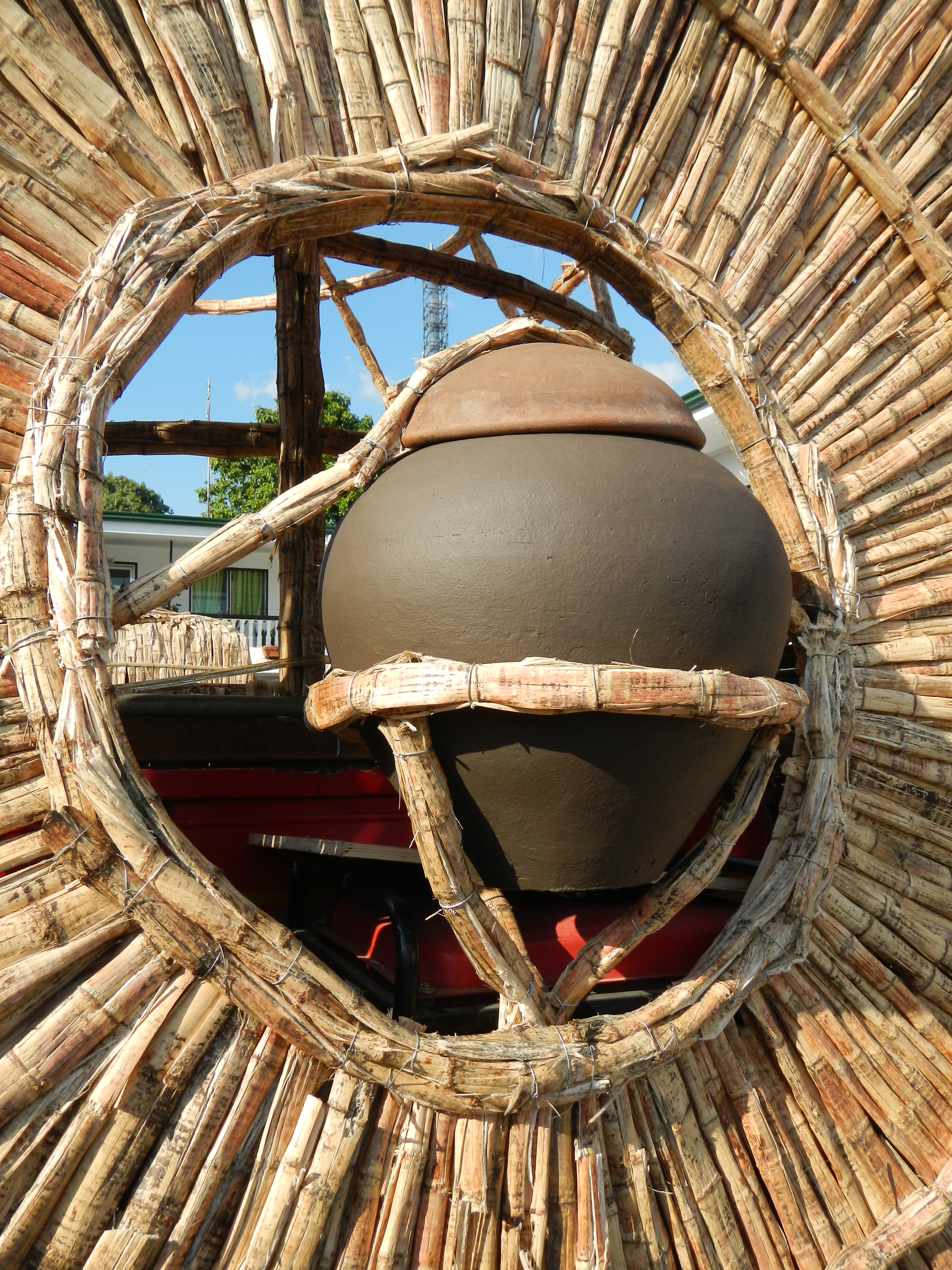
- A float in the Basi Festival in Naguilian, La Union depicting a giant basi burnay
- Type: Alcoholic drink
- Origin: The Philippines, Ilocos Region
- Alcohol by volume: 10%-16%
- Color: Pale red
- Flavor: Sweet, tangy, and earthy flavors
- Ingredients: Sugarcane juice, water, samac bark or leaves and glutinous rice
- Variants: Cachaça, rhum agricole

Basí is a traditional Ilocano fermented alcoholic beverage made from sugarcane juice, predominantly produced in Northern Luzon, Philippines particularly in the Ilocos Region. It is fermented in burnáy (earthen jars) and flavored with gamú or natural additives such as samak bark. Basí has been an integral part of Ilocano culture for centuries, commonly featured in various rituals and celebrations, with distinct regional variations in its production methods and flavor profiles.

== Description ==
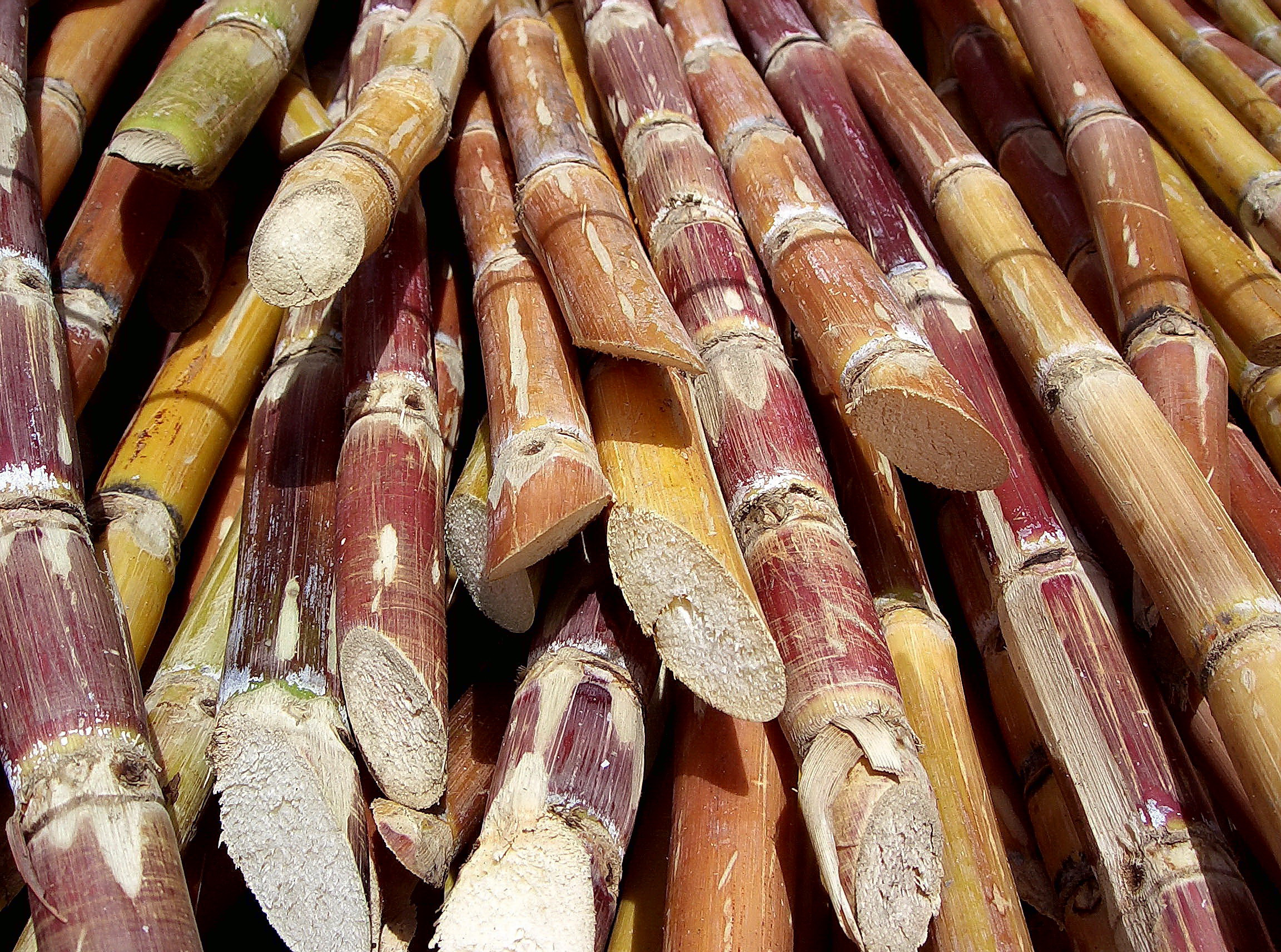
Unás or sugarcane stalks

Basi is a non-distilled alcoholic beverage created from fermented sugarcane juice. It is primarily produced in the northern provinces such as Ilocos Norte, Ilocos Sur, La Union, and Pangasinan, where it is more commercialized. Further north, basí is called fvayash in Sadanga and bayas in Kalinga. There are two main types of basí: basi lalaki, which tends to be dry and bitter; and basi babae, which is sweeter. The two types are differentiated by the concentration of sugarcane juice, microorganisms used for fermentation, and additives. Basi lalaki is traditionally prepared for men, and basi babae for women.

=== Preparation ===
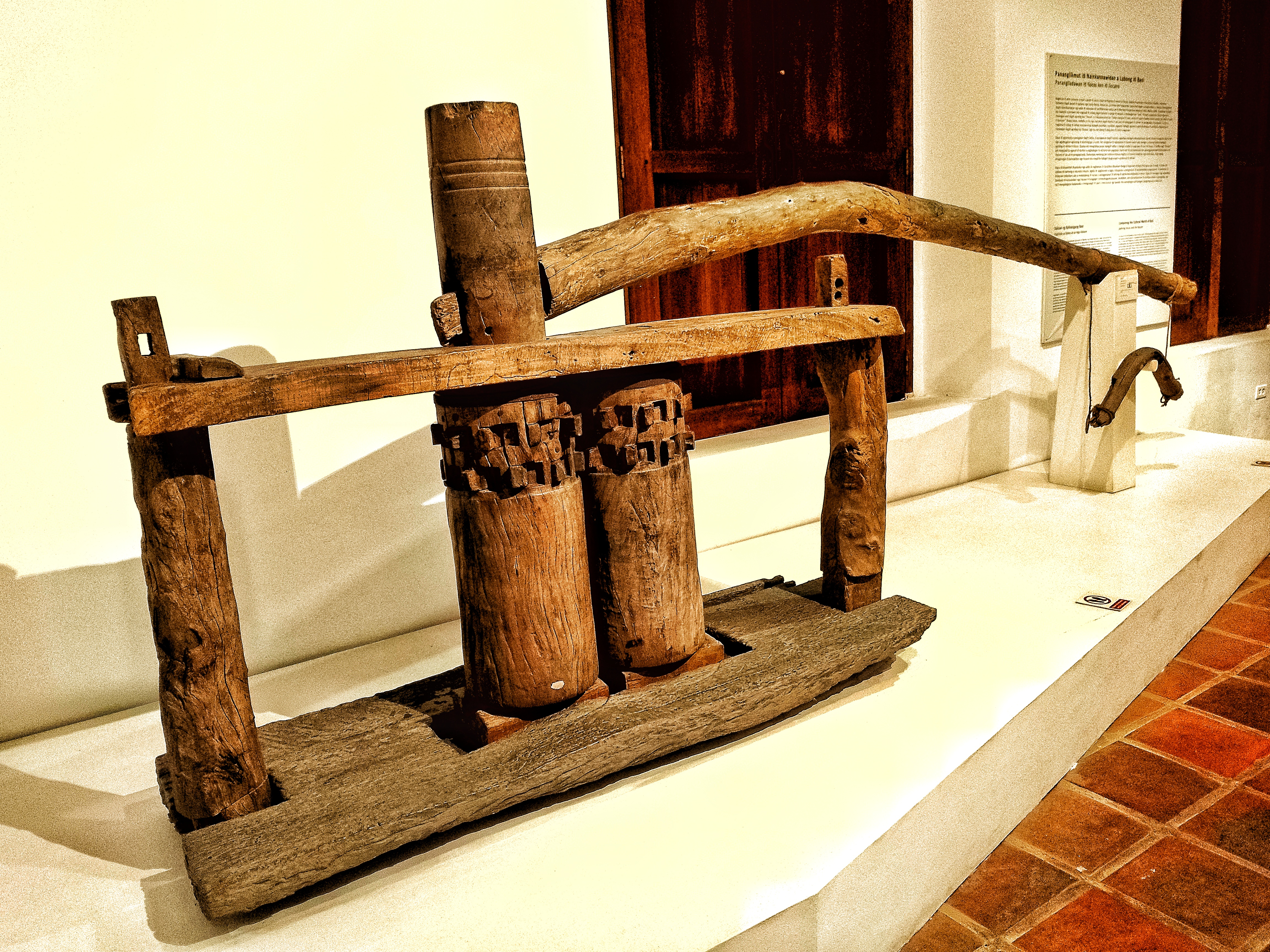
Sugarcane presser, used to extract sugarcane juice

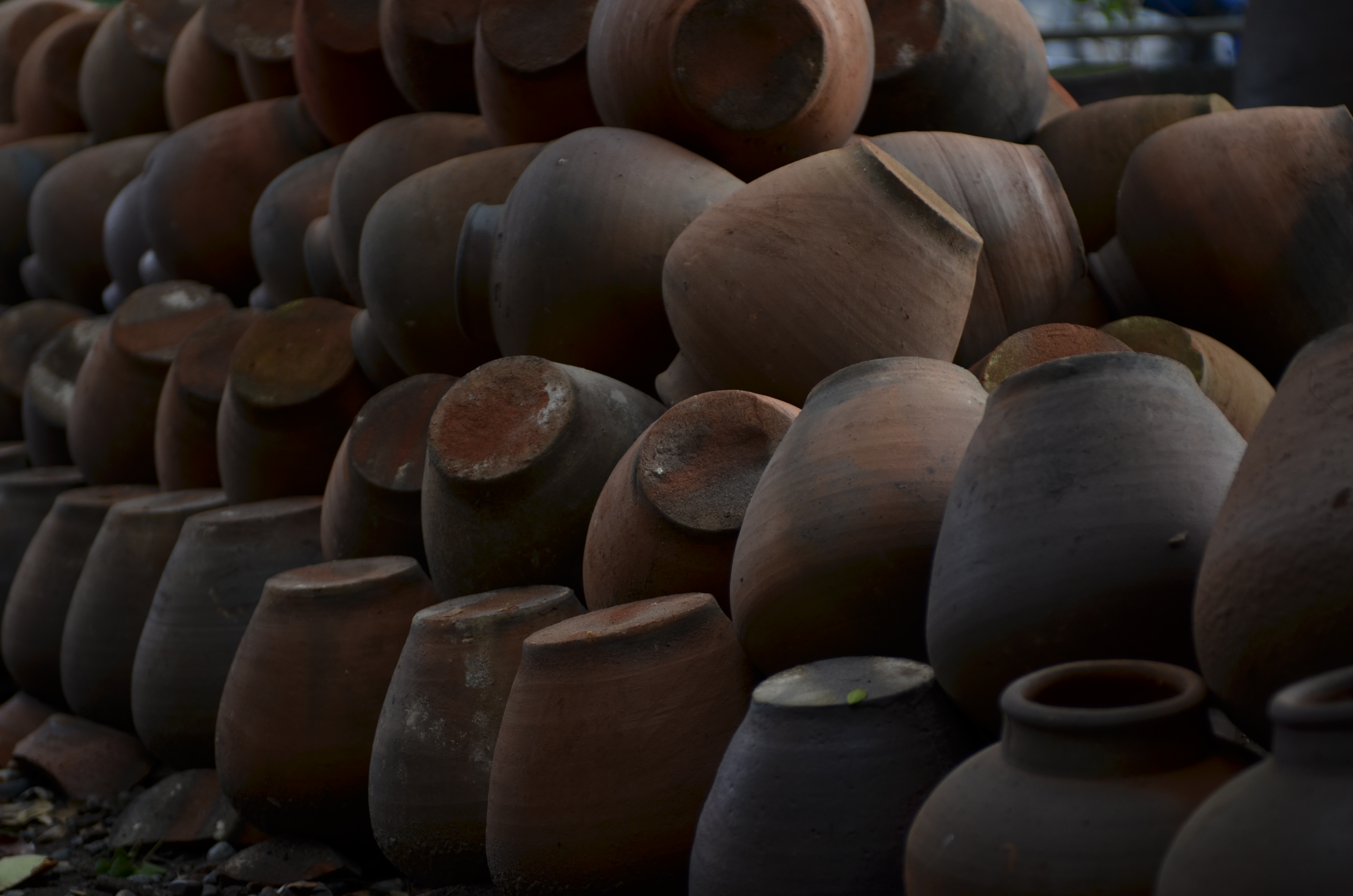
Burnáy earthen jars

The process of making basí is not standardized, and can vary frommaker to maker. There are three general methods of preparing basí from Ilocos, La Union, and Pangasinan. All three methods use sugarcane juice from crushed one year old disease-free stalks. Wooden presses called dadapilan in Ilocos or poliwes in Sadanga driven by a carabao are traditionally used to crush stalks, though a modern crushing machine may also be used.

==== Ilocos ====
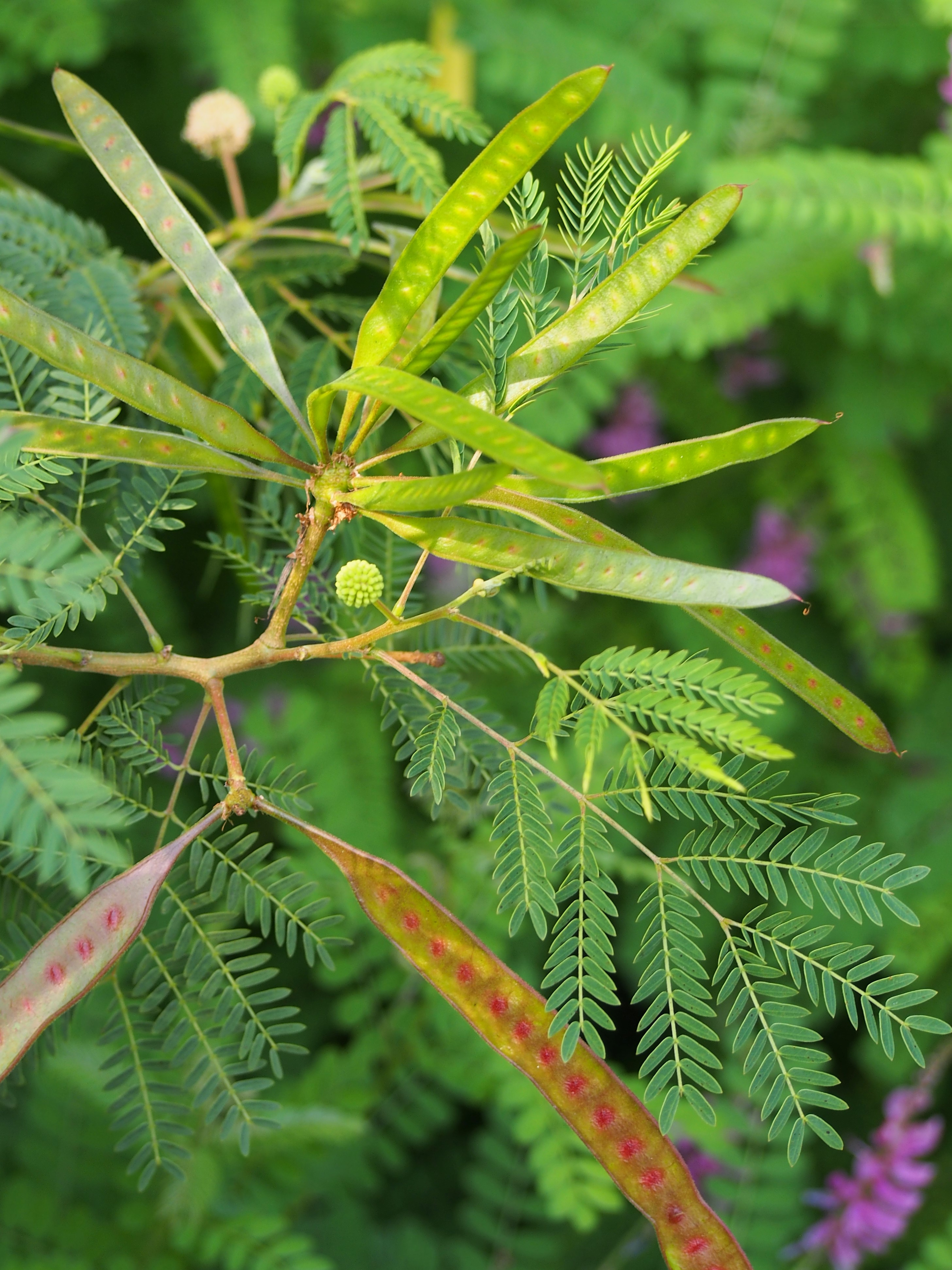
Kariskís or Ipil-ipil fruits

In Ilocos region, basí is produced primarily in Laoag, Sarrat, Piddig, Vintar, and Vigan. In the Ilocano method, water is added to the sugarcane juice and bagasse left over from pressing is used as fuel to boil the liquid. A mixture called gamu is added, made of ground dry samak bark and leaves combined with powdered cardis seeds and rice. The samak is the source of microorganisms. After cooling, the liquid is added to an earthen jar called a burnay, which is covered with fresh samak leaves secured around the neck of the jar. After three days, half of the gamu is removed and a starter called parec is added, which is made of ground dry samac bark and leaves, cardis seeds, and rice. The burnay is then left to incubate and age for 3–12 months, either sealed with carabao dung or buried in a hole and covered in soil and sealed with a stone. The final product has an alcohol content of 10–13%.

==== La Union ====
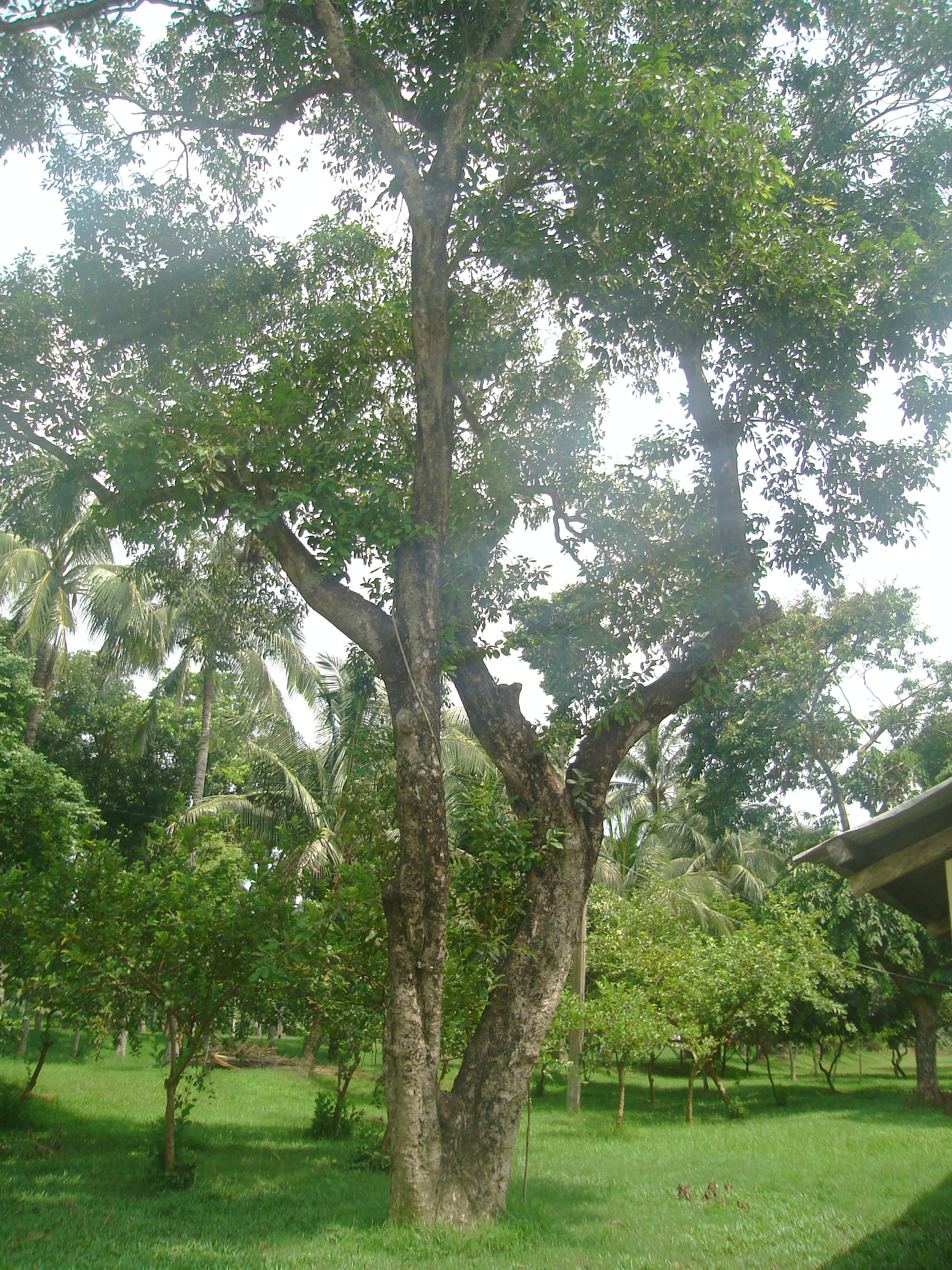
Lumbóy (Java plum) tree

The La Union method is particularly used in the town of Naguilian. As in the Ilocano method, water is added to the sugarcane juice and bagasse is used as fuel for boiling the liquid. One year old duhat bark, tangal bark and green guava leaves are added to the liquid. After boiling, the liquid is poured into a burnay, covered in banana leaves, and left to cool to 40–45 °C. A mixture of steamed rice and bubod starter called binubudan is then added and the mixture is left to incubate for one week. More powdered bubod is added, and fermentation continues for one month with aging taking a further 6–12 months. The resulting basí has an alcohol content of 12–15% and is characterized by a sweet-sour taste and a color varying from dark red to golden brown.

==== Pangasinan ====
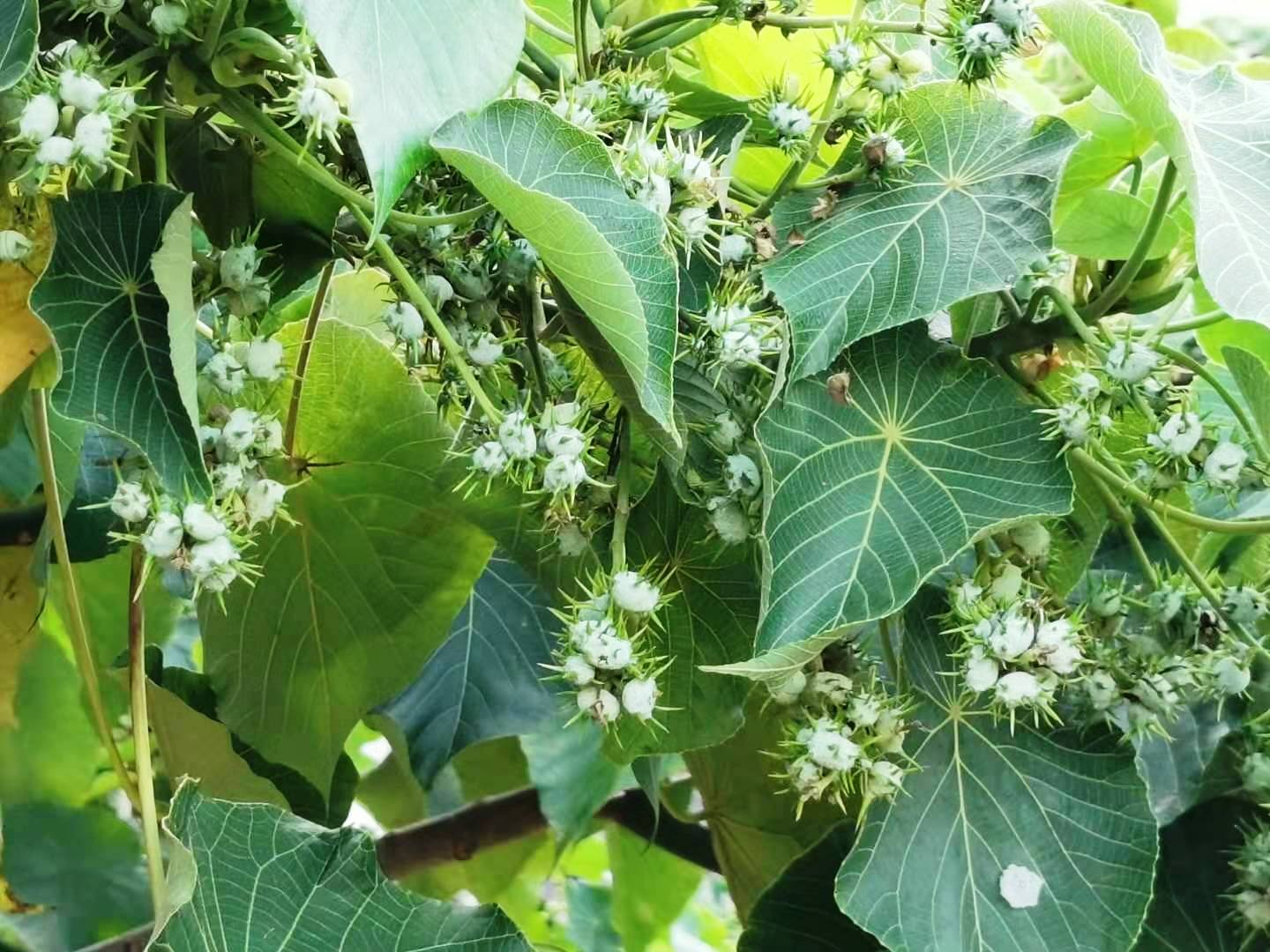
Samak tree leaf and fruits

Basí production in Pangasinan is less prevalent and occurs mainly in the town of Binalonan. The Pangasinan method is similar to that of Ilocos, with samak used as the source of microorganisms. After being poured into a burnay, the liquid is left to cool for 24 hours before ground, dried samak fruit is added. The burnay is then covered in brown paper and aged for 3–9 months. The product has an alcohol content of 12–13%.

== Production ==
Basí production has historically been concentrated in the Ilocos Region of the Philippines, as well as parts of the Cagayan Valley, Cordillera and Central Luzon regions, in predominantly Ilocano-speaking areas. Presently, major production hubs for basí are located in the provinces of Ilocos Norte, particularly in the cities of Batac and Laoag; Ilocos Sur, especially in the municipalities of San Ildefonso, Bantay and the city of Vigan; and La Union, notably in Naguilian and Bacnotan, where sugarcane continues to be a primary agricultural crop.

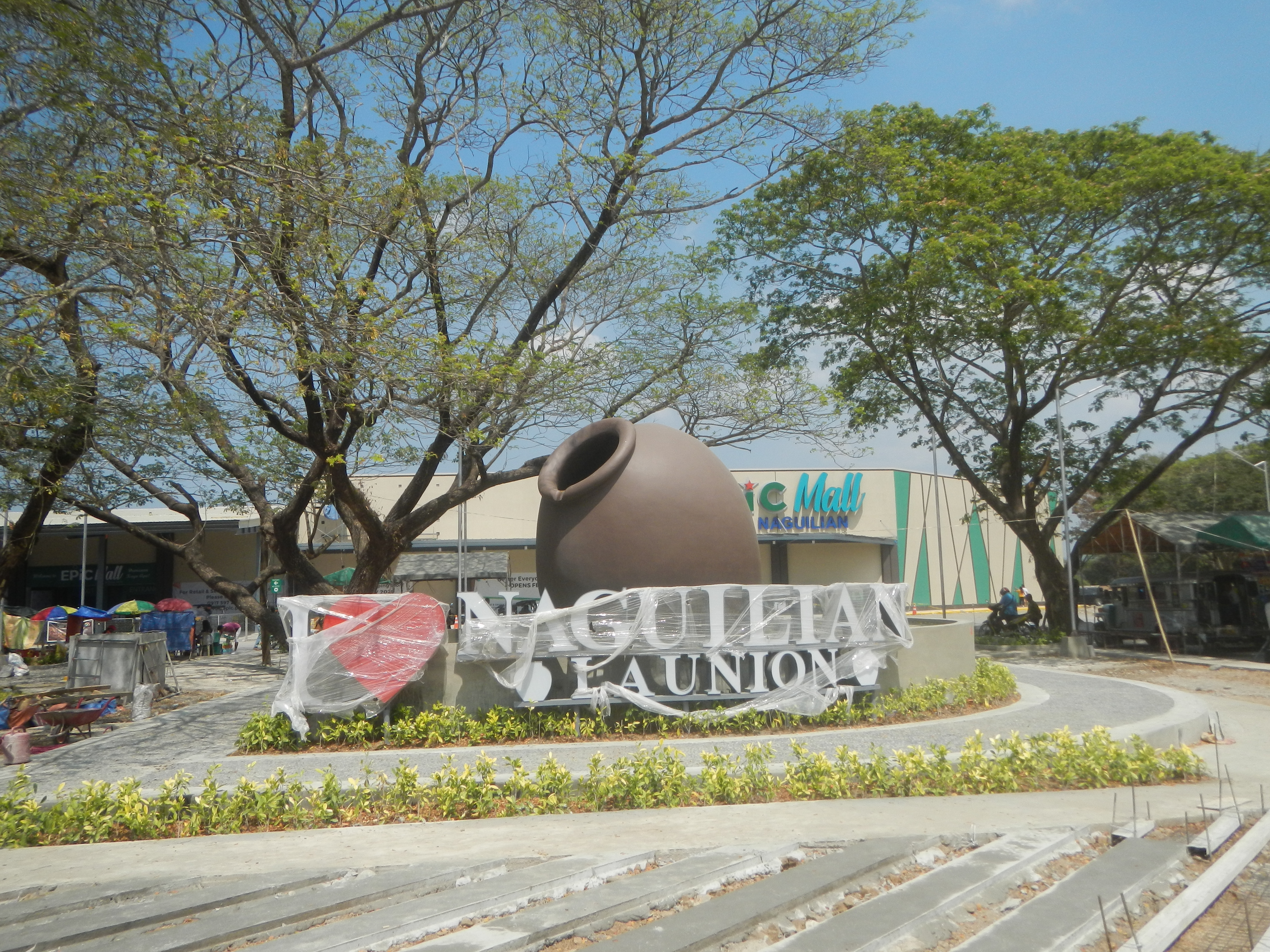
Basi statue in Nagulian, La Union

Unbranded basí is widely available in Ilocano-speaking provinces and is often sold in public or local markets. Typically stored in plastic water containers, it is commonly purchased by the gallon. While unbranded basí is often of acceptable quality, it does not represent the full range or standards of branded basí products.

Several private enterprises are involved in the production of branded basi. Notable brands include Don Domingo Basi from Bantay, Ilocos Sur; Cormel Basi from Laoag City, Ilocos Norte; Casa Blanca from Bacnotan, La Union; and Basi del Diablo Wines from Batac, Ilocos Norte which started making basi in the year 1906, 99 years after the Basi Revolt. Additionally, some local government cooperatives produce basi, including Basi Revolt (Gongogong Basi) from San Ildefonso, Ilocos Sur, and Naguilian Basi from Naguilian, La Union which is the One Town, One Product of the town.

== History ==
=== Basi Revolt 1807 ===
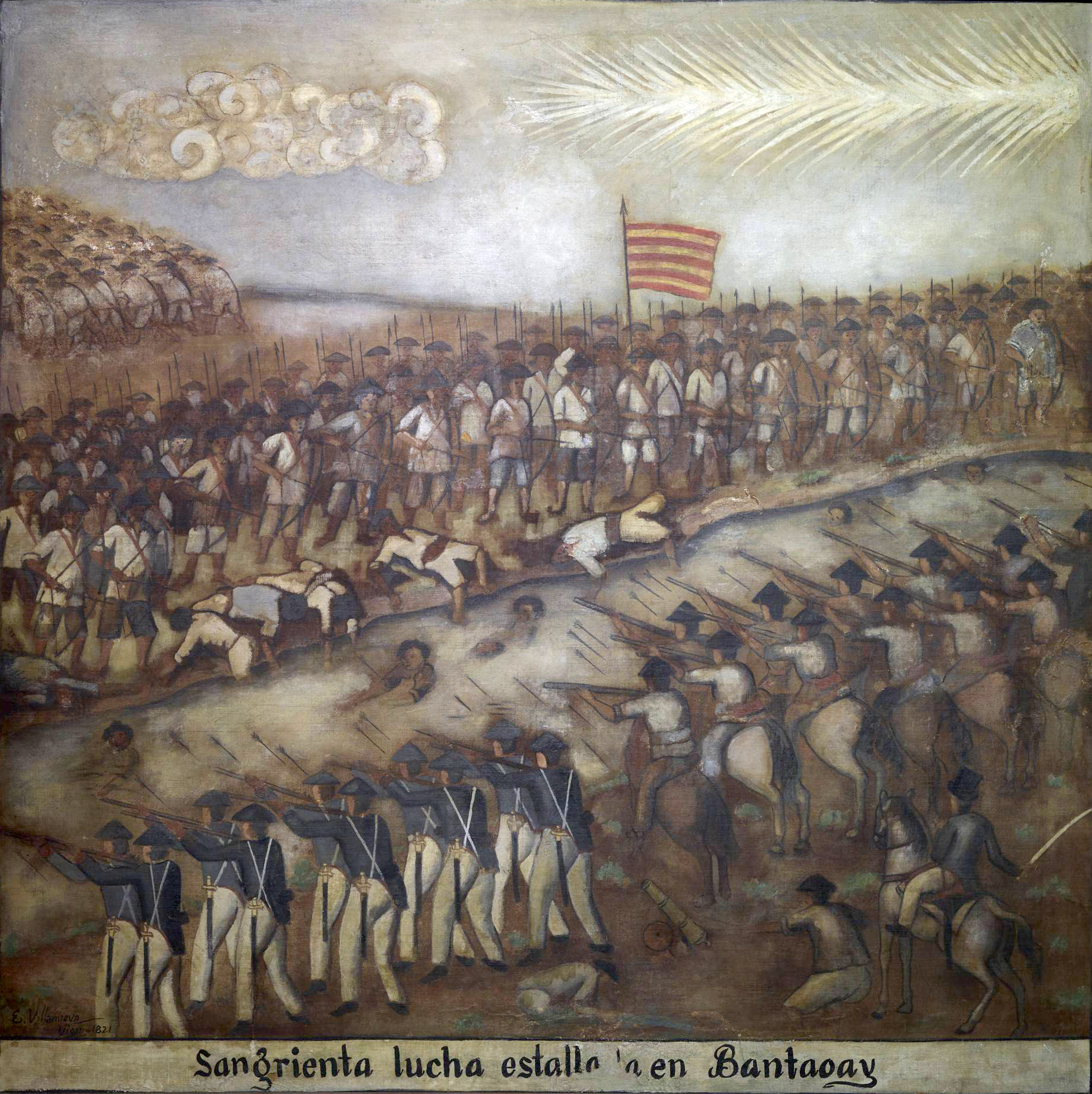
A bloody war between the Ilocanos and the local Spanish army breaks out in Bantaoay

Basi Revolt Flag

Historical accounts reveal that in 1786, widespread dissatisfaction emerged among the populace due to a monopoly imposed by the Spanish colonial government on basi, a sugarcane-based alcoholic beverage. This monopoly strictly regulated the production and consumption of basi and compelled local producers to sell it at a low official price. For the Ilocanos, basi held profound cultural and social significance, serving as a central element in rituals associated with childbirth, marriage, and death. Moreover, the basi industry played a crucial role in the economy of the Ilocos region, making the Spanish-enforced monopoly both a cultural and economic burden.

The oppressive policies of the colonial authorities eventually led to the Basi Revolt, also referred to as the Ambaristo Revolt, which began on September 16, 1807, in what is now Piddig. The uprising soon spread across the province and was spearheaded by Pedro Mateo, a cabeza de barangay from Piddig, and Saralogo Ambaristo, an Ilocano of Tinguian descent. The revolt drew participants from various towns in Ilocos Norte and Ilocos Sur, including Piddig, Badoc, Sarrat, Laoag, Sinait, Cabugao, and Magsingal, among others. Marching under a flag with yellow and red horizontal stripes, the rebels advanced southward toward the provincial capital of Vigan to protest against the injustices perpetrated by the colonial government. In response, the alcalde-mayor, Juan Ybañez, mobilized town mayors and Vigan-based troops to suppress the uprising. On September 28, as the rebels attempted to cross the Bantaoay River in San Ildefonso on their way to Vigan, they were ambushed by Spanish forces. The confrontation resulted in the deaths of hundreds of rebels, with the survivors captured, executed, or publicly paraded as a deterrent to future resistance.

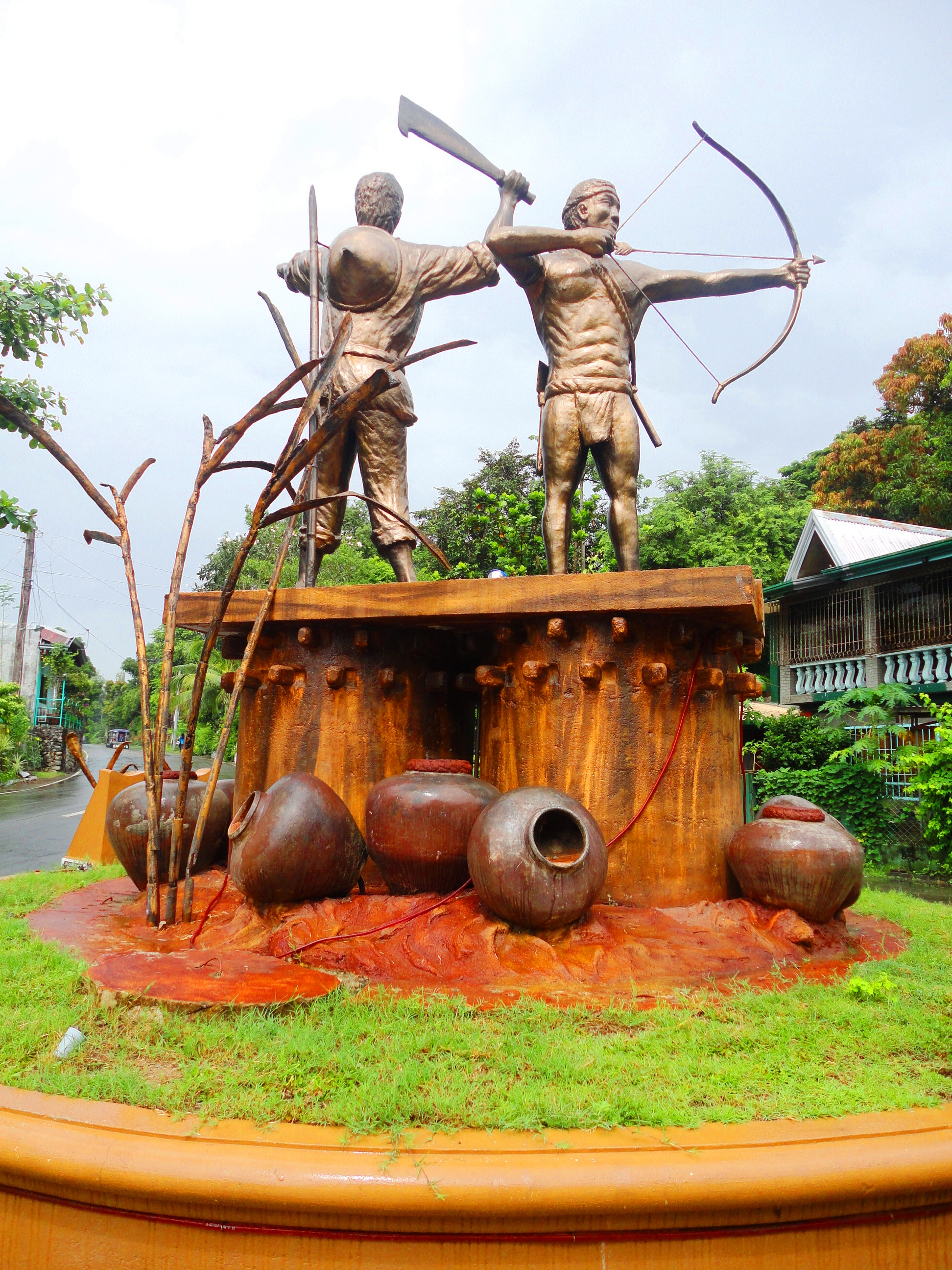
Monument to the Basi Revolt, Piddig, Ilocos Norte

The Basi Revolt lasted 13 days and prompted significant measures from the colonial government, including the division of Ilocos into Ilocos Norte and Ilocos Sur. While the rebellion failed to achieve its primary goal of liberation, it served as a catalyst for subsequent movements advocating justice and freedom in Northern Luzon. The partition of Ilocos Province into two distinct regions underscored the colonial government's attempts to manage and suppress the increasing discontent among the Ilocano people. Despite its short duration, the Basi Revolt remains a pivotal moment in the history of resistance against Spanish colonial rule, laying the foundation for future struggles for justice and self-determination.

== Cultural significance ==
Basi is a traditional Filipino sugarcane wine that holds significant cultural and spiritual importance, particularly in Ilocano culture. It has been deeply ingrained in various rituals and customs surrounding childbirth, marriage, and death since pre-colonial times.

As a staple in many Ilocano celebrations, basi is commonly used in events such as fiestas, weddings, christenings, birthdays, and funerals. It serves not only as a symbol of unity but also as an essential component in communal gatherings. In traditional rituals, basi is used in atang, a ritual offering of food and drink dedicated to the spirits of the deceased. Ilocanos believe that during the wake, the soul of the departed has not yet fully left the world of the living and still requires sustenance to aid its journey to the afterlife. Offerings of basi and food are made as a form of spiritual support. Additionally, basi is believed to pacify and honor various spirits, including kaibáan (spirits of the forest undergrowth) and mangmangkik (spirits of trees), and is also thought to ward off malevolent spirits through the recitation of prayers and chants.

The practice of pitik, which involves offering the first taste of basi to deceased relatives before anyone else partakes, is a vital component of these rituals. This is done by pouring a small amount of the wine into a separate glass or onto the ground, often accompanied by phrases such as "bagi yo, Apo" ("for you, Apo") or "bari-bari Apo". The term Apo may refer to God, ancestors, or spirits, and the offering signifies reverence, a request for blessings, and protection from harm or illness.

In funeral rites, basi plays an important role in gulgol, a cleansing ritual performed the morning after a burial. This ritual is aimed at dispelling grief, bad luck, and the lingering presence of the deceased's spirit. The cleansing involves pouring water mixed with basi or vinegar over the heads of family members, burning arútang (rice stalks), and offering gawéd (betel pepper leaf) and pinádis (rolled tobacco). Led by a manglualo (prayer leader), the ritual seeks to cleanse the family of sorrow and misfortune while ensuring the peaceful transition of the deceased to the afterlife. The practices highlight the enduring cultural significance of basi in Ilocano tradition—not only as a beverage for celebration but also as a symbol of spiritual connection, reverence, and purification.

A Basi Festival is held annually in Naguilian, La Union and Piddig, Ilocos Norte. In Naguilian, Basi Festival is held every first week of May in the town of Naguilian, La Union to celebrate the "basi". The festival mainly promotes Basi as a local product also Naguilian's one town, one product and the usual activities include street dancing, sport events, agri-trade fair & other amusement games.

The Batanes Islands were also named "Bashi" in old European records after the drink. It was named by the English explorer William Dampier in 1687 due to the drink being plentiful in the islands, though the drink of the Ivatan people is more specifically the palek of the native Ivatan people.

Their common drink is water; as it is of all other Indians: Besides which they make a sort of drink with the juice of the sugar-cane, which they boil, and put some small black sort of berries among it. When it is well-boiled, they put it into great jars and it is presently fit to drink. This is an excellent liquor, and very much like English Beer, both in colour and taste. It is very strong, and I do believe very wholesome: for our men, who drank briskly of it all the day of several weeks, were frequently drunk with it, and never sick after it. The natives brought a vast deal of it every day to those aboard and ashore: for some of our men were ashore at work on Bashee Island: which island they gave that name to from their drinking this liquor there; that being the name which the natives call'd this liquor by: and as they sold it to our men, very cheap, so they did not spare to drink it as freely. And indeed from the plenty of this liquor, and their plentiful use of it, our Men call'd all these Islands, the Bashee Islands."

— William Dampier, Dampier's Voyages (1906, Vol. 1, p.424)

== See also ==
- Intus
- Palek
- Palm wine
- Tapai
- Tapayan
- Tapuy
