= Miss Ilocos Sur =

Annual provincial pageant

- Type: Beauty pageant
- Headquarters: Ilocos Sur
- First edition: 2008
- Most recent edition: 2026
- Current titleholder: Nathalie Clarin; Narvacan
- Head: Board Member Janina S. Medina-Farinas
- Language: English; Ilocano; Filipino

The Miss Ilocos Sur pageant is an annual provincial pageant held in the province of Ilocos Sur, commonly every February within the Kannawidan or Ilocos Sur Festival, celebrating the founding anniversary of Ilocos Sur.

== History ==
The pageant is once known as the Saniata ti Ylocos Sur competition until its name was changed into Miss Ilocos Sur starting 2023. It was made part of the newly introduced Kannawidan Festival by the then late Governor DV Savellano. Its winners represent the province in national competitions, such as Binibining Pilipinas and Mutya ng Pilipinas. The first edition was held in 2008, where Patricia Francisco won, becoming the inaugural titleholder.

Along with the Miss Ilocos Norte, Mutia ti La Union and Limgas na Pangasinan pageants, these pageants are the big four local pageants of the Ilocos Region.

The Saniata's court consists of the winner, the Saniata ti Ylocos, it's runner ups, the Saniata World, Saniata Tourism, Saniata Environment, the 1st and 2nd runner ups.

Four titleholders, Adelma Krissel Palomares Benicta of Bantay (2020), Kamille Alyssa Pilarca Quinola of Caoayan (2021), but only reached Top 50 and Jewel Alexandria Palacat of Sigay (2022) represented Ilocos Sur in the Miss Universe Philippines pageant, while Joanna Francez Batalang competed in Binibining Pilipinas 2025

Krishnah Gravidez and Christine Opiaza once competed in this pageant as Miss Santiago and Miss Sinait in 2016 and 2020, and ended up both winning national pageants, the latter winning Miss Grand Philippines and eventually assuming the title of Miss Grand International 2024, and the other winning Miss World Philippines 2024. Krishnah finished as Miss World Asia in Miss World 2025.

== Selection of contestants ==
Municipalities usually conduct yearly screenings for women who are vying to join, while most towns or cities like Vigan, Bantay, Narvacan, Santa Maria, and Candon conduct annual pageants. The winner of these pageants are qualified in representing their municipality in Miss Ilocos Sur, if not, either a runner up is sent.

== Pageant ==
The pageant is annually held within the Kannawidan Festival, now Ilocos Sur Festival every February. It was normally scheduled every February 2 from 2014 until 2024. The contestants are evaluated by judges during the preliminary competition, each judged by their talent, pasarela, gown and intelligence.

On each final night, since 2023, fifteen semifinalists are chosen by judges to compete in the remaining rounds of the competition up until the final five. The last edition of the Saniata before transitioning to Miss Ilocos Sur chooses 6 remaining finalists to be crowned.

Miss Ilocos Sur now crowns two runner ups, two queens, Tourism and Environment and the main titleholder.

== Titleholders ==
Year	Municipality/City	Miss Ilocos Sur	Number of entrants
2026	Narvacan	Nathalie Clarin	32
2025	Banayoyo	Joanna Francez Batalang	30
2024	Santa Catalina	Yra Gertrude Rapisura	30
2023	Vigan	Anis Natividad Azees	34
2022	Vigan	Richelle Presto	34
2021	Narvacan	Donna Faith Liberato Cabero	25
2020	Santa Maria	Donnabelle Barnachea Erno	25
2019	Bantay	Adelma Krisel Palomares Benicta	28
2018	Sigay	Jewel Alexandria Palacat	27
2017	Salcedo	Angelica Maranan	27
2016	Bantay	Nicka Corpuz	33
2015	Candon	Kalani Joy Pagluanan	
2014	Caoayan	Kamille Alyssa Pilarca Quinola	
2013	Bangui, Ilocos Norte	Dana Javier	
2012	Carmen, Pangasinan	Hannah Sison	30
2011	Sinait	Dorothy Pagurayan	
2010	Bantay	Hazelyn Santos	
2009	No hometown	April Love Jordan †	19
2008	Tagudin	Patricia Francisco	

== Cities/municipalities by number of wins ==
City/Municipality	Titles	Years
Bantay	3	2010, 2016, 2019
Narvacan	2	2021, 2026
Vigan	2	2022, 2023
Banayoyo	1	2025
Santa Catalina	1	2024
Santa Maria	1	2020
Sigay	1	2018
Salcedo	1	2017
Candon	1	2015
Caoayan	1	2014
Sinait	1	2011
Tagudin	1	2008

== Crowns ==
From 2017 up to 2022, the Saniata crowns 4 queens with different jewel colors, primarily the winner wearing a pink colored crown.

The winner, wears the pink crown. Her runner ups, the Saniata World, Saniata Tourism and Environment wears crowns made from blue, red and yellow jewels.

Completing the court are the two runner ups, with no crowns but would be awarded sashes. In the present Miss Ilocos Sur competition, only five ladies are awarded titles. the first and second runner ups, Miss Tourism and Miss Environment, and Miss Ilocos Sur. It was introduced in the successor pageant in 2023, on where the crowns from the old pageant are not reused but were replaced with crowns made from white jewels.
