= Sinait Basilica =

Roman Catholic church in Ilocos Sur, Philippines

- Minor Basilica of Saint Nicholas of Tolentino; Archdiocesan Shrine of Santo Cristo Milagroso
- Basilica Menor de San Nicolas de Tolentino Santuario de Santo Cristo Milagroso (Spanish); Basilika Menor ni San Nikolas de Tolentino Santuario ni Santo Kristo Milagroso (Ilocano)
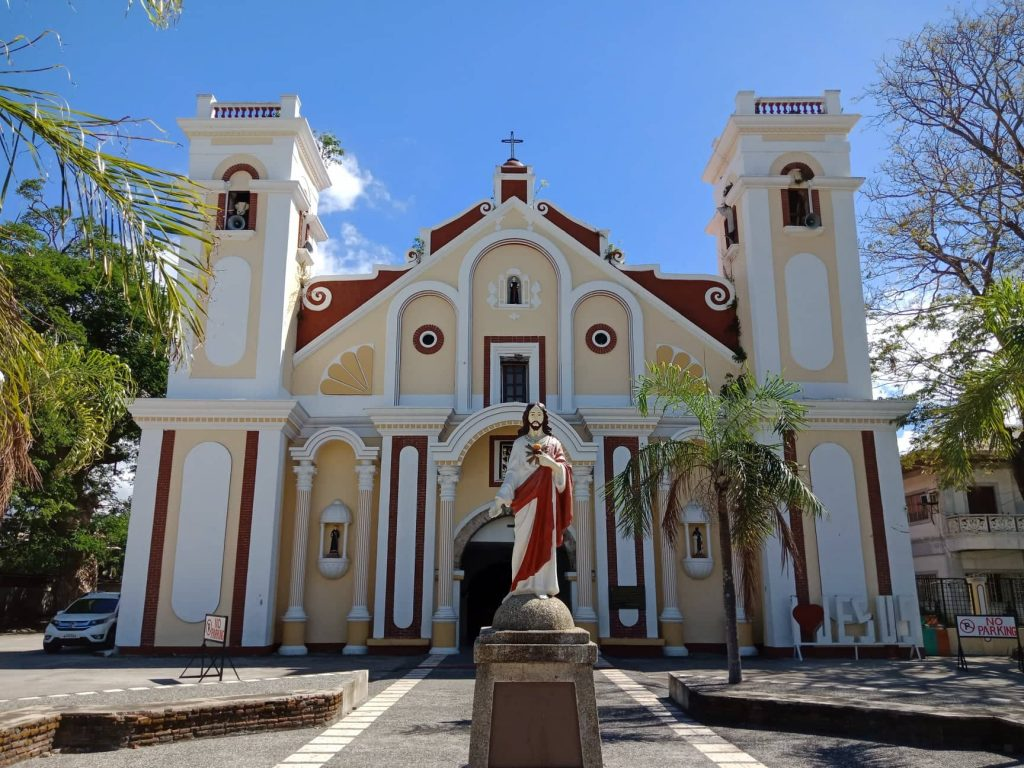
- Church facade

- Location in Luzon Location in the Philippines
- 17°51′56″N 120°27′29″E
- Location: Sinait, Ilocos Sur
- Country: Philippines
- Denomination: Roman Catholic

History
- Status: Minor Basilica, Archdiocesan Shrine, Parish
- Founded: 1574
- Dedication: Saint Nicholas of Tolentino

Architecture
- Functional status: Active
- Architectural type: Church building
- Style: Baroque

Administration
- Archdiocese: Nueva Segovia

Clergy
- Archbishop: David William Antonio

The Minor Basilica of Saint Nicholas of Tolentino and Archdiocesan Shrine of Señor Santo Cristo Milagroso, also known as Sinait Minor Basilica or Sinait Church, is a Roman Catholic church in the municipality of Sinait, Ilocos Sur, in northern Philippines. The church is known for housing the El Santo Cristo Milagroso, a life-sized dark-skinned image of crucified Christ. It is dedicated to Saint Nicholas of Tolentino and is under the administration of the Archdiocese of Nueva Segovia. In May 2021, it was granted the title of minor basilica, the 19th in the Philippines and the first in its archdiocese.

== History ==
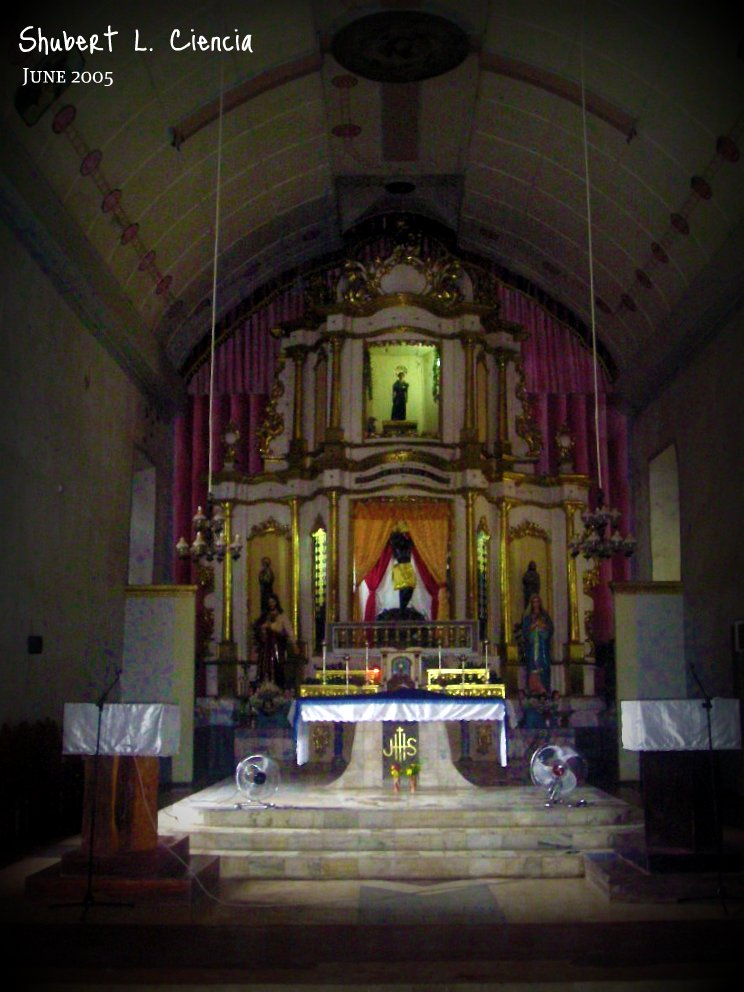
The reredo of the Sinait Basilica, with the Santo Cristo Milagroso image enshrined at the lower center.

It was founded in 1574 and was completed in 1598, making it as one of the oldest religious buildings in the Philippines and the region. The Augustinian friars initially administered the church until it was transferred to the secular clergy in 1772 before being returned in 1854 to the Augustinians.

On May 3, 2018, on the feast day of the finding of the El Santo Cristo Milagroso, the church was declared as an archdiocesan shrine by Archbishop Marlo Mendoza Peralta of the Archdiocese of Nueva Segovia. From that point on, the church became known as the Archdiocesan Shrine of Señor Santo Cristo Milagroso or alternatively as the Santuario de Santo Cristo Milagroso.

On May 3, 2021, Archbishop Peralta announced that Pope Francis has elevated the 16th century church to the rank of minor basilica. The announcement also coincided with the opening of the church’s “Jubilee Door” and exactly three years since the parish was declared as Archdiocesan Shrine of Santo Cristo Milagroso.

The church was supposed to be formally elevated into a minor basilica on September 10, 2021, feast day of Saint Nicholas of Tolentino. However, due to the on-going COVID-19 pandemic, the declaration of its elevation was done on February 16, 2022, in a Eucharistic celebration presided by the Apostolic Nuncio to the Philippines Archbishop Charles John Brown with Archbishop of Nueva Segovia Marlo Mendoza Peralta (concelebrants) and Archbishop of Lingayen-Dagupan Socrates Villegas (concelebrants), and attended by Archbishop of Manila Cardinal Jose Fuerte Advincula (homilist), Archbishop-emeritus of Cotabato Cardinal Orlando Beltran Quevedo (who gave a message), and six other bishops from Northern Luzon. Upon its elevation, it became known as Basilica Menor de San Nicolas de Tolentino, Santuario de Santo Cristo Milagroso.

== Santo Cristo Milagroso ==
The 400-year old image of El Santo Cristo Milagroso shares its history with the La Virgen Milagrosa, a Marian image enshrined in the Saint John the Baptist Basilica in the neighboring Badoc.

The Miraculous Statue of the Black Nazarene (El Santo Cristo Milagroso), fondly called by its residents as "Apo Lakay," a treasure of Ilocandia, traces itself to Nagasaki, Japan. Along with the image of the La Virgen Milagrosa, It is said to have been sent floating the sea in a wooden box by Christians in Japan who were operating in secret for fear of persecution by the Tokugawa Bakufu. It escaped the destruction of churches in Nagasaki in 1614 on the Bakufu's orders. The statue is one of three religious statues that survived the destruction.

Local accounts tell that in 1620, both the images of Santo Cristo Milagroso and Virgen Milagrosa were found in a floating crate at the boundary of the present-day barangays of Dadalaquiten Norte in Sinait, and Paguetpet in Badoc. The image of the crucified Christ went on to be enshrined in Sinait, while the Marian image was brought to Badoc. Devotees fondly call the image as Apo Lakay, and is attributed with providing miraculous healing. The devotion to the Santo Cristo Milagroso draws multitude of pilgrims to the church of Sinait especially every Friday, earning the municipality the moniker "Quiapo of the North". A smaller image of Santo Cristo Milagroso is also installed in a small chapel in the shore of Dadalaquiten Norte where it was found.
