= Miss La Union =

Annual beauty pageant in the La Union province of the Philippines

Miss La Union (Ilocano: Mutia Ti La Union) is an annual beauty pageant in the province of La Union of the Philippines. It began as the “Miss La Union” contest in 1978. The early editions were held years apart. The pageant took a break in 1992 and was not revived until 2000 as the “Millennium Mutya ng La Union” competition. Since 2011, it has become a major annual activity celebrating the founding of the province. In 2012, the pageant became known as “Mutia ti La Union” after the Iloko code was passed. Along with the Miss Ilocos Norte, Miss Ilocos Sur and the Limgas na Pangasinan pageants, the Mutia ti La Union pageant is one of the major pageants of the Ilocos Region and Northern Luzon.

The Municipality of Agoo is the most successful municipality in Mutia Ti La Union. They have 8 titles in total. Agoo is the only municipality to crown her successor from within the same Municipality six times in a row from 2012 to 2017.

The reigning "Mutia Ti La Union" is Kristine Billy Mateo Tabaday of Sudipen, who was crowned on March 2, 2023, at the Baywalk Poro Point in City of San Fernando, La Union. This marks the third consecutive year of the municipality of Sudipen taking home the Mutia ti La Union crown, with Tabaday following the 2019-2020 back to back wins of Meghan Sanglay and Divina Marie Villanueva from the same town.

== First Edition (Miss La Union 2002) ==
The First edition of Miss La Union (subsequently rebranded as Mutya Ng La Union, and later as Mutia Ti La Union) was held in San Fernando, La Union which is the capital city of the province. The very first Miss La Union was Rochelle Gualberto of the Municipality of Bauang.

== Muti Ti La Union (2012-present) ==
In 2012, the pageant was renamed Mutia Ti La Union, in honor of the Ilokano heritage of the province, and in compliance with Provincial Ordinance 026-2012, the Local Language Code of La Union.

== Participating municipalities ==
Municipalities	Festivals
Agoo	Dinengdeng Festival
Aringay	Uong Festival
Bacnotan	Diro Festival
Bagulin	Alibay Festival
Balaoan	Panagyaman Festival
Bangar	Abel-Panday Festival
Bauang	Baggak Festival
Burgos	Boyboy Festival
Caba	Timpuyog Festival
Luna	Pinnakan Festival
Naguillian	Basi Festival
Pugo	Tinungbo Festival
Rosario	Linubian Festival
Santol	Itan Festival
San Fernando	Pindangan Festival
San Gabriel	Buyboy Festival
San Juan	Dalluyon Festival
Sto Tomas	Daing Festival
Sudipen	Kawayan Festival
Tubao	Tabako Festival

== Mutia Ti La Union winners by year ==
Year	Winner	Name	Location
2002	Bauang	Rochelle Gualberto	San Fernando
2003	Aringay	Evangelyn Taguba	San Fernando
2004	Bauang	Medard Angela German	San Fernando
2006	Agoo	Fatima Glenna Cabilatazan	San Fernando
2007	San Fernando	Anna Katrina Bautista	San Fernando
2008	San Juan	Michelle Tuttle	San Fernando
2009	Agoo	Nicole Tuttle	San Fernando
2010	San Gabriel	Kimberly Santos	San Fernando
2011	Santo Tomas	Shiela Nisperos	San Fernando
2012	Agoo	Aiyana Mikiewicz	San Fernando
2013	Agoo	Kimberle Mae Penchon	San Fernando
2014	Agoo	Maria Heidie Ronato	San Fernando
2015	Agoo	Alessandra Casimiro	San Fernando
2016	Agoo	Trizia Ocampo	Naguillian
2017	Agoo	Carina Cariño	San Fernando
2018	San Fernando	Donnabelle Barnachea Erno	San Fernando
2019	Sudipen	Anne Margareth Sanglay	San Fernando
2020	Sudipen	Divina Marie Villanueva	San Fernando
2023	Sudipen	Kristine Billy Tabaday	San Fernando

== Winners from each municipality ==
City/Municipality	Titles	Years
Agoo	8	2006, 2009, 2012, 2013, 2014, 2015, 2016, 2017
Sudipen	3	2019, 2020, 2023
San Juan	2	2008, 2024
San Fernando	2	2007, 2018
Bauang	2	2002, 2004
Santo Tomas	1	2011
San Gabriel	1	2010
Aringay	1	2003

== Notes ==
- The Municipality of Agoo has had the most winners in this pageant since 2002 (in 2006, 2009, 2012, 2013, 2014, 2015, 2016 and 2017)
- The Municipality of Bauang has the second highest placements in this pageant next to Agoo Semi Finalists: 2003, 2004, 2005, 2006, 2009, 2010, 2012 and 2014. Runners Up: 2007, 2011, 2013, 2015, 2016. and Two Winners in 2002 and 2004.
- The City of San Fernando, La Union tied with Bauang has also the same numbers of placements in the pageant.

== Contestant/winners competed in regional, national and international pageant ==
1. Aiyana Mikiewicz (Agoo 2012, Winner) - Bb. Pilipinas Gold Candidate, Miss Tourism World Philippines 2013 / Miss Tourism World Asia 2013
2. Sheryl Lou Franco (Aringay) - Miss Philippines Earth Water 2003, Miss Tourism World 2005 (Best in National Costume)
3. Sheryl Ann Ducusin (San Fernando City) - Miss Philippines Earth Fire 2002
4. Medard Angela German (Bauang) - Miss Philippines Earth 2005 Candidate
5. Fatima Glenna Cabilatazan (Agoo 2005, Winner) - Miss Philippines Earth Candidate 2006
6. Ma. Kristina Tabas (Pugo 2008, Mutia Ti Kalikasan) - Miss Philippines Earth Candidate 2008
7. Anna Katrina Bautista (San Fernando City 2007, Winner) - Miss Philippines Earth 2007 / Turismo Pilipina 2008 3rd Runner Up
8. Kimberle Mae Penchon (Agoo 2013, Winner) - Miss Beauche International 2014 (Winner), Binibining Pilipinas 2016 Top 15 Semifinalist
9. Mabel Joy Verceiles (Bauang 2013, Mutia Ti Kalikasan) - Miss Philippines Earth 2014 Candidate
10. Rochelle Saavedra (Bauang 2010, Semifinalist) - Miss Bikini Philippines 2010 Candidate
11. Maria Heidie Ronato (Bauang/Agoo 2014, Winner) - Miss Bikini Philippines 2010 Candidate
12. Brendolf Muñoz (San Fernando/Bauang 2010, Muti Ti Turismo) - Miss Philippines Earth 2010 Candidate
13. Christine Joy Picardal (Rosario 2013, Semifinalist) - Miss Diamond Philippines 2016 (Appointed), Miss Diamond Of The World 2016 Winner
14. Carina Cariño (Agoo, Mutia Ti La Union 2017) - Miss Millennial Philippines 2017 Candidate, Miss Millennial Philippines 2017 First Runner Up, Binibining Pilipinas 2020 Candidate (due to the pandemic, the coronation night moved to July 11, 2021, from April 2020)
15. Trizia Ocampo (Agoo, Mutia Ti La Union 2016) - Miss World Philippines 2017 and Miss Universe Philippines 2020 Candidate
16. Shawntel Cruz (Santo Tomas, Mutia Ti Turismo La Union 2017) Miss World Philippines 2017 Candidate
17. Divina Marie Villanueva (Sudipen, Mutia Ti La Union 2020) - Miss World Philippines 2021 Candidate.
18. Shaira May Soria (Pugo, Mutia Ti Agrikultura 2020) - Miss Tourism Philippines 2021 3rd Runner Up. Queen Of The North 2022 3rd Runner Up.
19. Anjali Camacho Pradeep Kumar (Bauang, Mutia Ti Agriturismo 2023) - Queen of The North 2021.
