= Cabugao =

Municipality in Ilocos Sur, Philippines

- Municipality
- Municipality of Cabugao
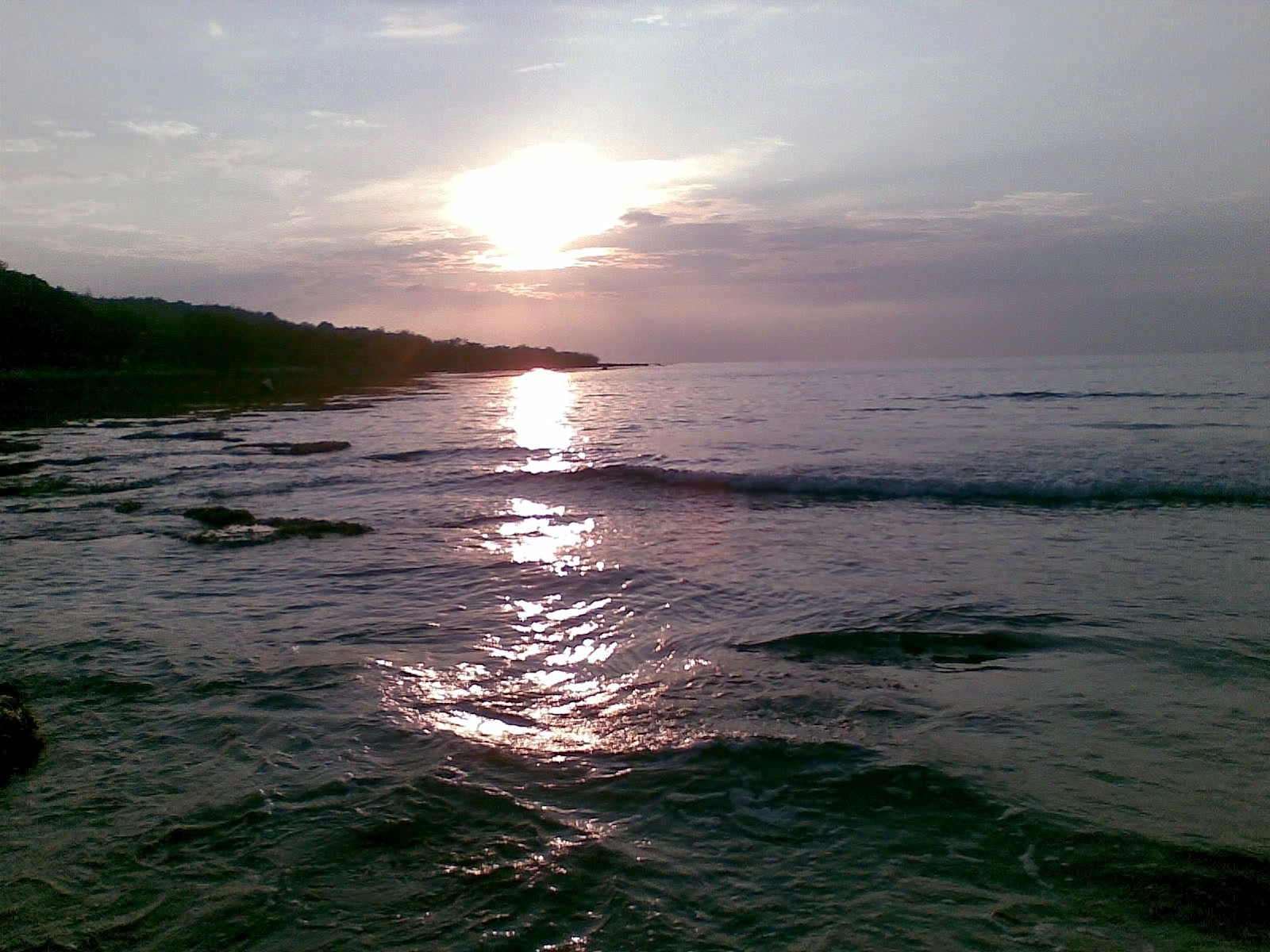
- Sunset at Cabugao Beach

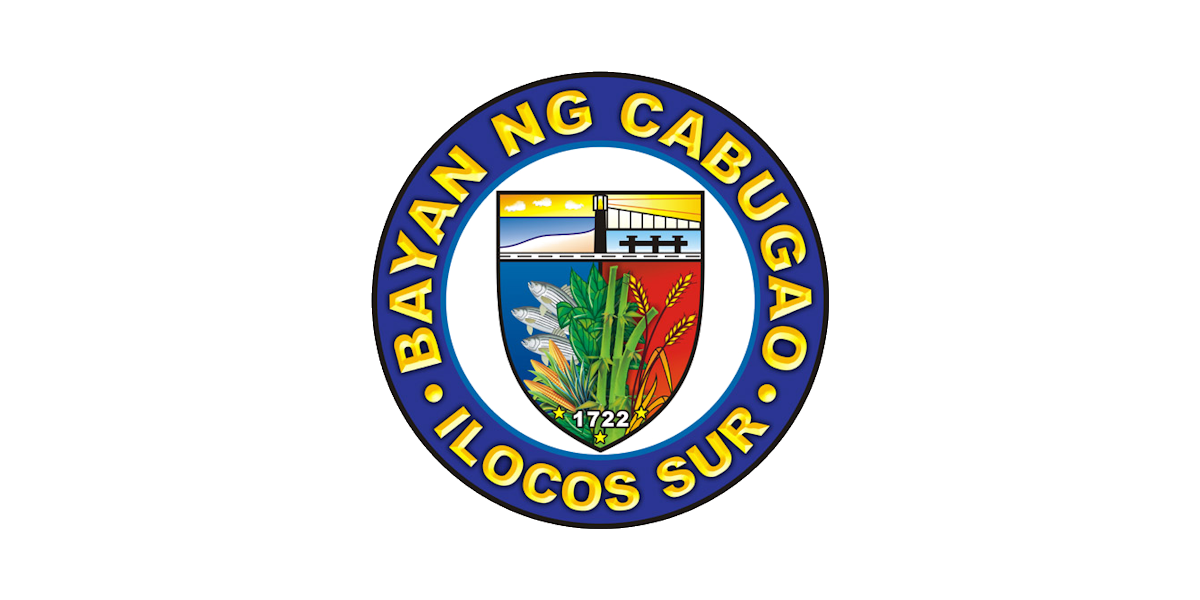
- Flag Seal
- Motto: Bagnos Cabugao!
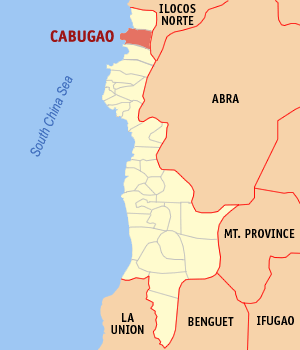
- Map of Ilocos Sur with Cabugao highlighted
- Interactive map of Cabugao
- Location within the Philippines
- Coordinates: 17°47′41″N 120°27′20″E
- Country: Philippines
- Region: Ilocos Region
- Province: Ilocos Sur
- District: 1st district
- Founded: 1781
- Barangays: 33 (see Barangays)

Government
  - Type: Sangguniang Bayan
  - Mayor: Edgardo S. Cobangbang Jr.
  - Vice Mayor: Jemaima T. Yee
  - Representative: Deogracias Victor B. Savellano
  - Municipal Council: Members: Josh Edward S. Cobangbang; Danilo Q. Gazmen; Amelia S. Abarquez; Jeremy A. Seguban Jr.; Bryann Jett S. Pano; Mariedes D. Soller; Randy Baniaga G. Kinaud; Dodjie S. Santella
  - Electorate: 28,479 voters (2025)

Area
  - Total: 95.56 km^{2} (36.90 sq mi)
- Elevation: 29 m (95 ft)
- Highest elevation: 194 m (636 ft)
- Lowest elevation: 0 m (0 ft)

Population (2024 census)
  - Total: 38,981
  - Density: 407.9/km^{2} (1,057/sq mi)
  - Households: 9,172

Economy
  - Income class: 1st municipal income class
  - Poverty incidence: 6.26% (2023)
  - Revenue: ₱ 1,465 million (2024)
  - Assets: ₱ 4,115 million (2024)
  - Expenditure: ₱ 591.4 million (2024)
  - Liabilities: ₱ 854.4 million (2024)

Service provider
  - Electricity: Ilocos Sur Electric Cooperative (ISECO)
- Time zone: UTC+8 (PST)
- ZIP code: 2732
- PSGC: 0102905000
- IDD : area code: +63 (0)77
- Native languages: Ilocano; Tagalog
- Website: cabugao.gov.ph

Cabugao, officially the Municipality of Cabugao (Ilocano: Ili ti Cabugao; Filipino: Bayan ng Cabugao), is a municipality in the province of Ilocos Sur, Philippines. According to the 2024 census, it has a population of 38,981 people.

== Etymology ==
In the beginning, the place was only a wilderness - a thick forest where peaceful nomads roamed and hunted. For fish, which were also abundant, there was a river. On these occasional visits, the hunters noticed the fertile and flatlands that could be tilled, and so they decided to stay. They were the first settlers.

As to how the name of the town came to be, one legend tells the story of Kabu Angaw who was the head of a clan. In a rivalry, Kabu Angaw suffered defeat, forcing him and his remaining warriors to move southward until they reached the town where the friendly and hospitable nomads settled. Kabu Angaw's ability to relate stories endeared him to the settlers. His fairness and righteousness earned him respect and esteem, eventually making him the lord of the land. His leadership became so legendary that his people were referred to as “taga Kabu Angaw”. When he died, the citizens deeply mourned ouch a great loss.

Another story has it that the town by the river was ruled by a certain Aggao. When the Spaniards arrived, his subjects called him “Cabo Aggao”. Finding difficulty in pronouncing the headman's name, the Spaniards contracted it to “Cabugao” denoting not only the ruler but also the place he ruled.

As time passed, Kabu Angaw or Cabo Aggao was transformed into Cabugao.

== Geography ==
St. Mark the Evangelist Parish Church

The Municipality of Cabugao is the second northernmost town of the province of Ilocos Sur. It is accessible by almost all modes of land transportation and a 7–kilometer portion of the MacArthur Highway passes through the town center.

Its total land area is 9,556 hectares (23,610 acres). It is bordered by Sinait to the north, San Juan to the south, by Nueva Era, Ilocos Norte and the Cordillera Mountain Ranges to the east; and, by the South China Sea to the west.

Cabugao is situated 27.73 kilometres (17.23 mi) from the provincial capital Vigan, and 428.66 kilometres (266.36 mi) from the country's capital city of Manila.

=== Topography ===
Hills are located in all the four corners of the municipality. The Cordillera mountain range borders on the eastern part of the municipality. Salomague Island can be found off the coast of Barangay Sabang.

The Cabugao River is the largest river in the municipality. Two tributaries to the east feed the main channel of the Cabugao River. The headwaters of the north fork of the Cabugao River originate in Sitio Caset in Barangay Maradodon and the southern fork's headwaters originate in Sitio Gaco in Barangay Cacadiran. Cabugao's drinking water supply comes from three water resources in the Cordilleras.

The barangays that lie along the Cabugao River are prone to flooding especially during the rainy season. The uncontrollable surge of water erode the properties that line the Cabugao River, endangering life and limb. The creek that runs through the poblacion easily clogs up during the rain causing portions near it to be inundated.

=== Barangays ===
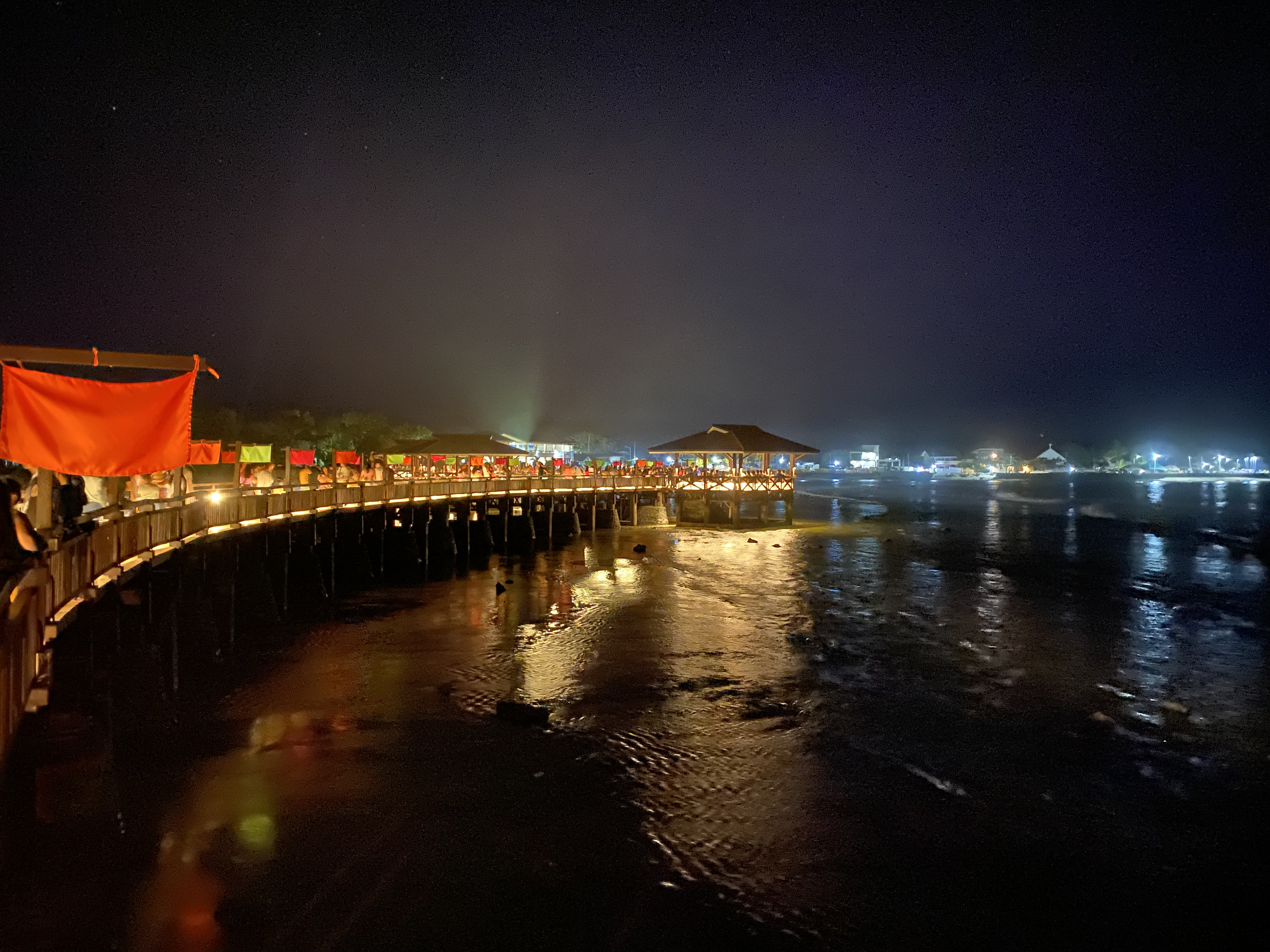
Boardwalk at Barangay Sabang

Cabugao is politically subdivided into 33 barangays Each barangay consists of puroks and some have sitios.

There are four barangays that are in the poblacion which are considered urban (highlighted in bold) and the rest of the 29 barangays are rural. There are 94 sitios.

- Alinaay
- Aragan
- Arnap
- **Baclig (Poblacion)**
- Bato
- **Bonifacio (Poblacion)**
- Bungro
- Cacadiran
- Caellayan
- Carusipan
- Catucdaan
- Cuancabal
- Cuantacla
- Daclapan
- Dardarat
- Lipit
- Maradodon
- Margaay
- Nagsantaan
- Nagsincaoan
- Namruangan
- Pila
- Pug-os
- **Quezon (Poblacion)**
- Reppaac
- **Rizal (Poblacion)**
- Sabang
- Sagayaden
- Salapasap
- Salomague
- Sisim
- Turod
- Turod-Patac

=== Climate ===
Climate data for Cabugao, Ilocos Sur
Month	Jan	Feb	Mar	Apr	May	Jun	Jul	Aug	Sep	Oct	Nov	Dec	Year
Mean daily maximum °C (°F)	30 (86)	31 (88)	32 (90)	34 (93)	33 (91)	31 (88)	30 (86)	30 (86)	30 (86)	31 (88)	30 (86)	29 (84)	31 (88)
Mean daily minimum °C (°F)	18 (64)	19 (66)	21 (70)	23 (73)	24 (75)	25 (77)	24 (75)	24 (75)	24 (75)	22 (72)	21 (70)	19 (66)	22 (72)
Average precipitation mm (inches)	9 (0.4)	11 (0.4)	13 (0.5)	23 (0.9)	92 (3.6)	122 (4.8)	153 (6.0)	137 (5.4)	139 (5.5)	141 (5.6)	42 (1.7)	14 (0.6)	896 (35.4)
Average rainy days	4.6	4.0	6.2	9.1	19.5	23.2	24.0	22.5	21.5	15.2	10.5	6.0	166.3
Source: Meteoblue (modeled/calculated data, not measured locally)

The climate of Cabugao is characterized by two (2) well-pronounced seasons; dry and wet. Dry season is usually experienced from November to April; while wet (rainy) season starts in May until October. Occasional rainfall also occurs at the onset of the dry season caused by the north-east monsoon passing through the region. The town is naturally shielded from the trade winds by the Cordillera Mountain Ranges. In the middle of May, drift winds from the Pacific Ocean sweep over the area, signaling the imminent wet season.

Temperature ranges from 21.6 to 34.7 °C (70.9 to 94.5 °F) or a minimum temperature of 23.9 °C (75.0 °F) and a 31.9 °C (89.4 °F) maximum. Average relative humidity is 87.3%.

== Demographics ==
Population census of Cabugao

Year	Pop.	±% p.a.
1903	8,848	—
1918	12,602	+2.39%
1939	13,867	+0.46%
1948	14,823	+0.74%
1960	17,791	+1.53%
1970	20,444	+1.40%

Year	Pop.	±% p.a.
1975	22,664	+2.09%
1980	24,424	+1.51%
1990	28,033	+1.39%
1995	28,567	+0.35%
2000	31,459	+2.09%
2007	33,847	+1.01%

Year	Pop.	±% p.a.
2010	35,706	+1.96%
2015	37,501	+0.94%
2020	38,884	+0.77%
2024	38,981	+0.06%

Source: Philippine Statistics Authority

In the 2024 census, Cabugao had a population of 38,981 people. The population density was 410 inhabitants per square kilometre (1,100/sq mi).

The first data on population of the Municipality of Cabugao was recorded on March 2, 1903, indicating 8,848 residents. This number steadily increased to 35,706 in the 2010 census. The biggest population increase was on December 31, 1918, with 3,754.

=== Religion ===
The people of Cabugao are generally religious. A majority of the population is Roman Catholic, while a sizable number practice other religions such as the Iglesia Filipina Independiente, Iglesia ni Cristo, various Protestants groups, the Church of Jesus the Latter Day Saints, and Islam.

== Economy ==
Poverty incidence of Cabugao (%)

Source: Philippine Statistics Authority

People are primarily engaged in farming and fishing. Cabugao is one of the most urbanized towns in the province.

== Government ==
=== Local government ===
Cabugao, belonging to the first congressional district of the province of Ilocos Sur, is governed by a mayor designated as its local chief executive and by a municipal council as its legislative body in accordance with the Local Government Code. The mayor, vice mayor, and councilors are elected directly by the people through an election which is held every three years.

=== Elected officials ===
Members of the Municipal Council (2025–2028)
Position	Name
Congressman	Ronald V. Singson
Mayor	Josh Edward S. Cobangbang
Vice-Mayor	Edgardo S. Cobangbang Jr.
Councilors	Michael Angelo B. Sarmiento
Councilors	Thaddeus U. Soller
Councilors	Danni Rica G. Magdato
Councilors	Jeremy A. Seguban Jr.
Councilors	Arlene D. Kinaud
Councilors	Robertson R. Gorospe
Councilors	Vicky S. Serna
Councilors	Gabriel G. Sunio

== Education ==
The Cabugao Schools District Office governs all public and private education within the municipality. It has currently 26 public elementary schools and some of private primary schools, and four public high schools.

=== Primary and elementary schools ===
- Aragan Elementary School
- Aragan Elementary School
- Bungro Elementary School
- Cabugao North Central School
- Cabugao South Central School
- Cabugao-UCCP Pre-School
- Caellayan Elementary School
- Carusipan Elementary School
- Caset Primary School
- Catucdaan Elementary School
- Cuantacla-Sagsagat Elementary School
- Daclapan Elementary School
- Dardarat Elementary School
- Lipit-Cuancabal Elementary School
- Maradodon Elementary School
- Nagsantaan Primary School
- Nagsincaoan Elementary School
- Namruangan Elementary School
- Pila Elementary School
- Pug-os Elementary School
- Reppaac Elementary School
- Sabang Elementary School
- Sagayaden Elementary School
- Salapasap Elementary School
- Salomague Elementary School
- Sir Mosesnar Special Learning School
- Sisim Elementary School
- Turod Elementary School

=== Secondary schools ===
- Cabugao Institute
- Cabugao Integrated School (Formerly Cabugao South Central School)
- Cabugao National High School (Formerly Turod National High School)
- Lipit National High School
- Pug-os National High School
- Sisim National High School

== Sister cities ==
- Hawaiʻi County, Hawaiʻi, United States
- Maui County, Hawaiʻi, United States

== Trivia ==
- Salomague Port in Cabugao was an ancient port that the place of departure for over 100 sacadas destined to work in the sugarcane fields of Hawaii in the 1930s-40s and 19
- According to local legend, the first rubber sandals entered Ilocos Sur through Salomague Port. As a result, rubber sandals are sometimes called ismagel, which is an Ilocano-ized word meaning "smuggle."
- The novel "Po-on" by F. Sionil Jose begins in Cabugao.
