= Josh Edward Cobangbang =

Filipino politician

Josh Edward Cobangbang (born Josh Edward Seguban Cobangbang; 1 December 1994) is a Filipino politician who was the youngest mayor elected in the history of Philippines at the age of 21 and 7 months of the Municipality of Cabugao, Province of Ilocos Sur. The previous youngest mayor title was held by Jono Jumamoy who was elected as mayor of Inabanga on 14 May 2007 at the age of 21 and 8 months. Cobangbang is currently a municipal councilor....

== Early life and career ==
The son of mayor Edgardo Cobangbang Jr. and Jerlie Cobangbang, he finished his elementary and secondary education at the St. Paul College of Ilocos Sur. He obtained his Bachelor of Science in Business Management at De La Salle University in Manila at the age of 19.

Despite his young age, Cobangbang has already shown a wealth of maturity. Prior to his election as Mayor, he concurrently helped manage their family company, 5J Seguban Agriventures.

In the May 9, 2016 National Elections, Cobangbang took a leap of faith to run for the mayoral seat in his town of Cabugao, Ilocos Sur. He represented the National People's Coalition (NPC) - guided by his family and supported by numerous grassroots-based political leaders and stakeholders that saw the positive changes of Cabugao. The young Cobangbang won through a landslide victory garnering 17,356 votes over his rival Dr. Rudy Singson who only garnered 405 votes, officially making him the youngest mayor in Philippine History.

In 2018, Cobangbang earned his master's degree in Public Management with specialized track on Local Governance at the Ateneo School of Governance. In 2019, he won as the No. 1 Councilor-elect in their town as a Sangguniang Bayan Member. On 9 May 2022, National Elections, he again won the mayoral seat after finishing his term as a Councilor. Their entire slate won, sweetened with the vaory? of 10-0.
