= Badoc Basilica =

Roman Catholic church in Ilocos Norte, Philippines

- Minor Basilica and Parish of Saint John the Baptist
- Basílica Menor de San Juan Bautista (Spanish)
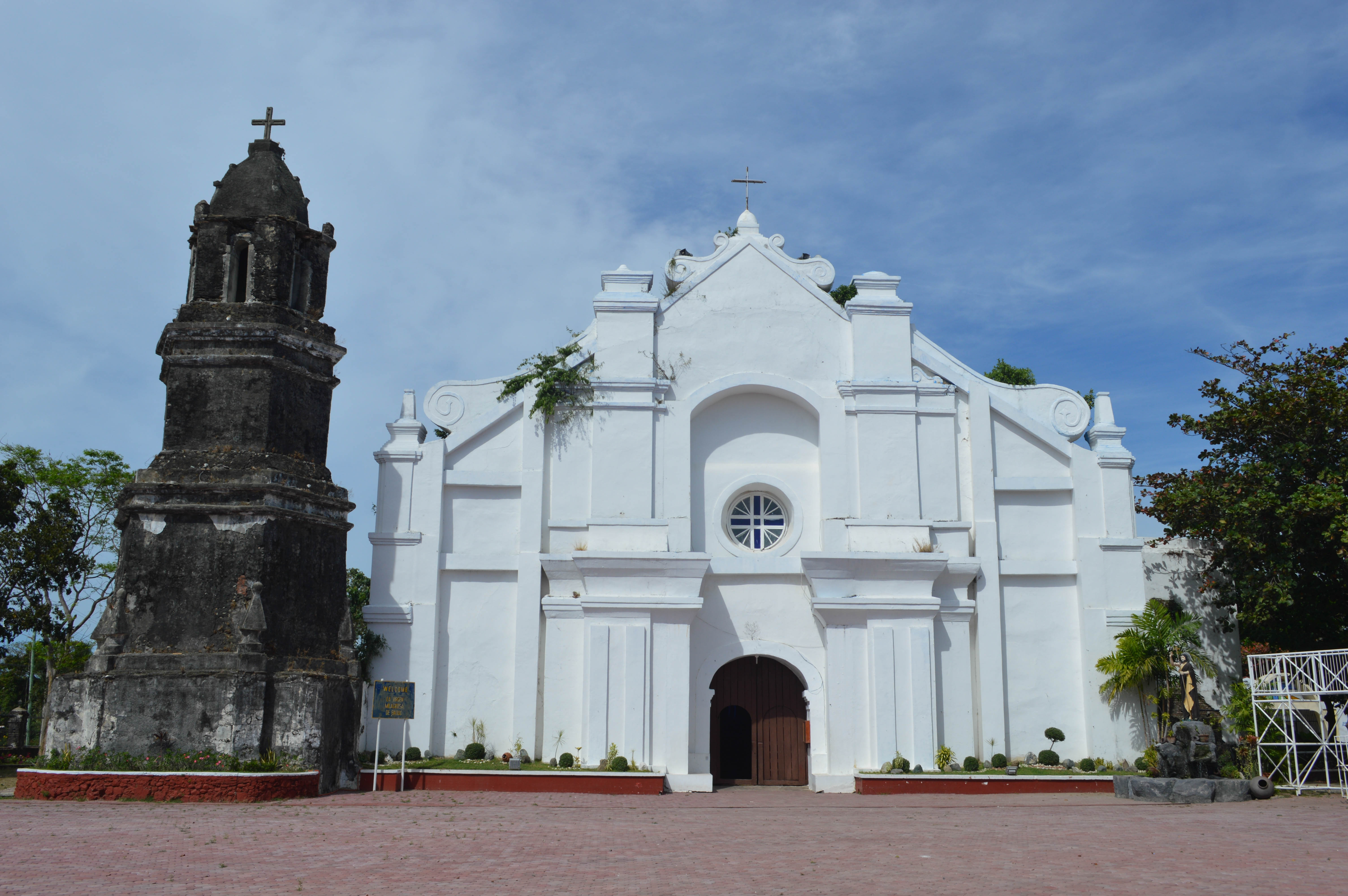
- Basilica facade in 2016

- Location in Luzon Location in the Philippines
- 17°55′41″N 120°28′30″E
- Location: Badoc, Ilocos Norte
- Country: Philippines
- Denomination: Roman Catholic

History
- Status: Minor Basilica, Diocesan Shrine, Parish
- Dedication: St. John the Baptist

Architecture
- Functional status: Active
- Architectural type: Church building
- Style: Baroque

Administration
- Archdiocese: Nueva Segovia
- Diocese: Laoag

Clergy
- Archbishop: David William Antonio
- Bishop: Renato Pine Mayugba
- Priest: Frederick Astudillo

The Minor Basilica and Parish of Saint John the Baptist, Diocesan Shrine of La Virgen Milagrosa de Badoc—Mary, Cause of Our Joy, also known as Badoc Minor Basilica and Badoc Church, is a Roman Catholic church in Badoc, in the province of Ilocos Norte, Philippines. It is under the jurisdiction of the Diocese of Laoag. The basilica houses the Virgin Milagrosa statue of the Virgin Mary. It is dedicated to John the Baptist and has the title of a minor basilica since 2018. It was built in the 17th century in the Baroque style.

== History ==
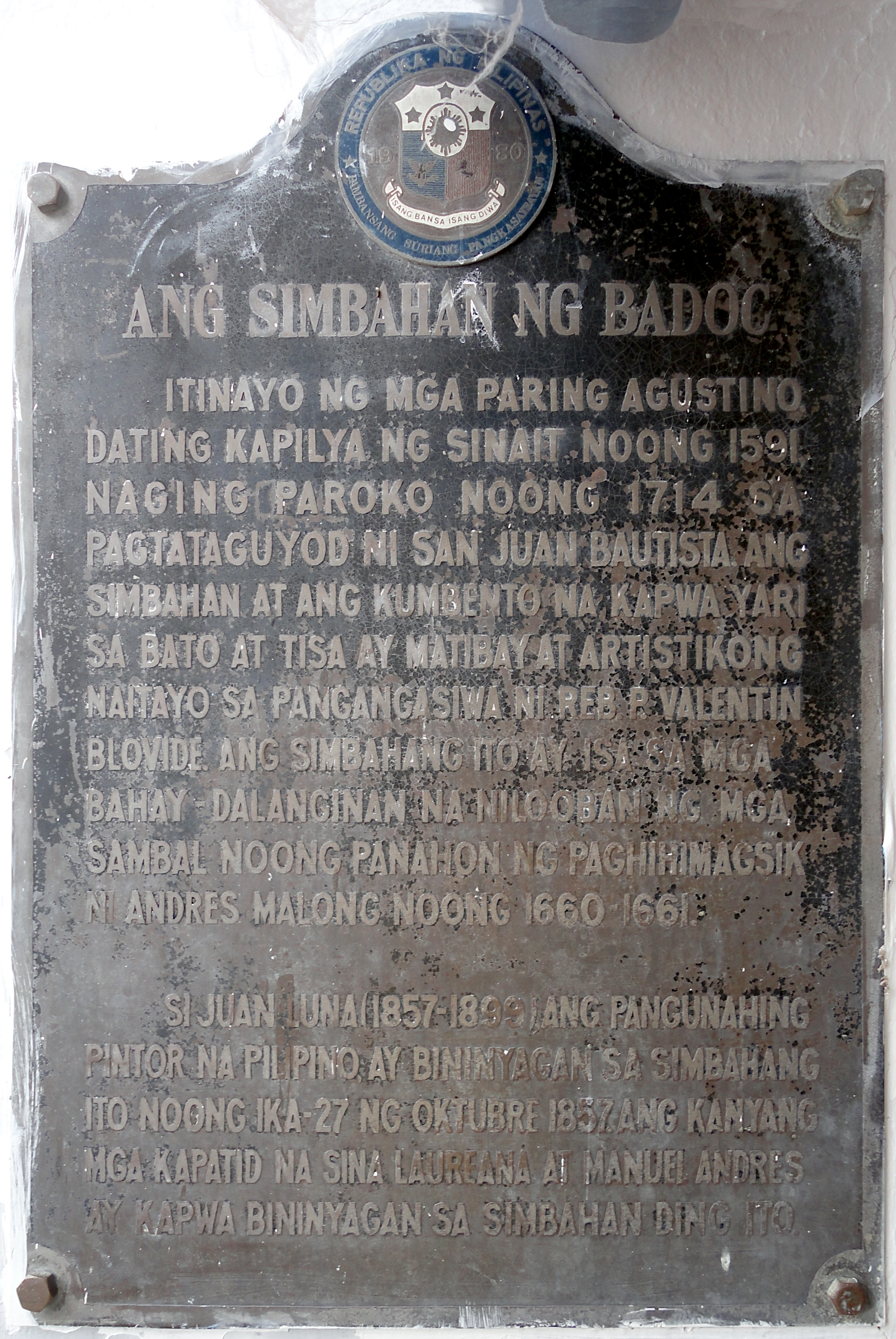
Church NHI historical marker installed in 1980

The architect of the Badoc Basilica is Brother Antonio Estavillo, OSA, who also built the Church of St. Augustine in Paoay, which is recognized as a world heritage site. The basilica is one of the eleven Baroque Filipino-Hispanic churches in Ilocos Norte. The side walls of the single-nave church are reinforced with massive buttress walls to protect against earthquakes. To the left of the entrance to the church is a bell tower.

The church was converted into a parish church in 1714 when it was separated from the parish of St. Nicholas of Tolentino (now also a basilica) in Sinait. The parish church was elevated by Pope Francis to a minor basilica on December 16, 2018.

== Virgen Milagrosa ==
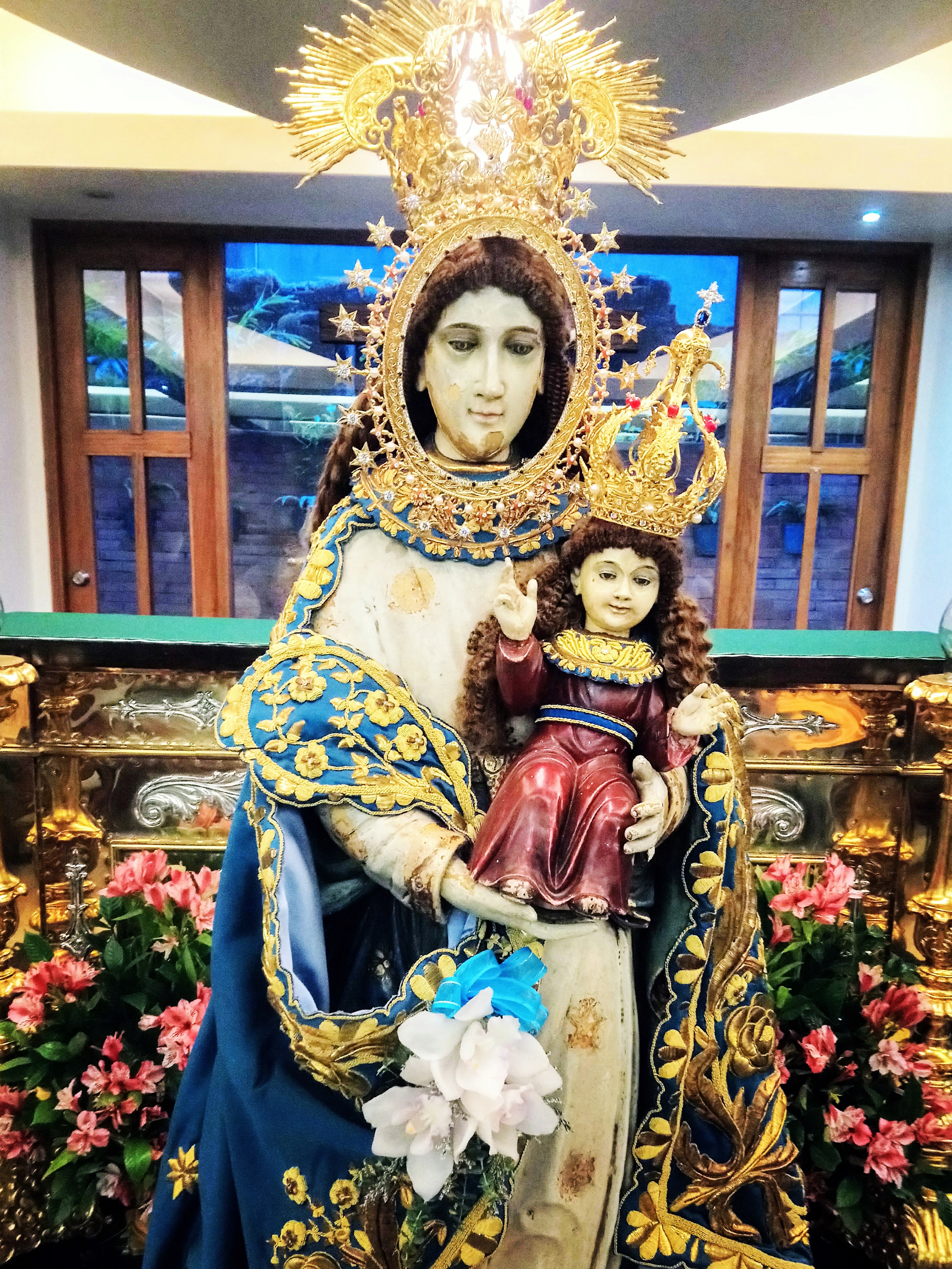
The canonically crowned image of Our Lady of Badoc

As a Marian shrine, the church houses the statue of the miraculous Virgin Mary, the Virgen Milagrosa. The story traces the life-size statue back to Nagasaki in Japan. It is said to have been sent floating the sea in a wooden box by Christians in Japan who were operating in secret because of the persecution during the Tokugawa shogunate, along with a miraculous statue of Christ of the Black Nazarene. It escaped the destruction of churches in Nagasaki in 1614 on the Bakufu's orders, making it one of three religious statues that survived the destruction.

The statues came ashore in 1620 at Paguetpet on the border between Sinait and Badoc. The statue of Mary came to Badoc, the statue of Christ to Sinait. The statue of the Virgin Mary was canonically crowned on May 31, 2018.

== Gallery ==
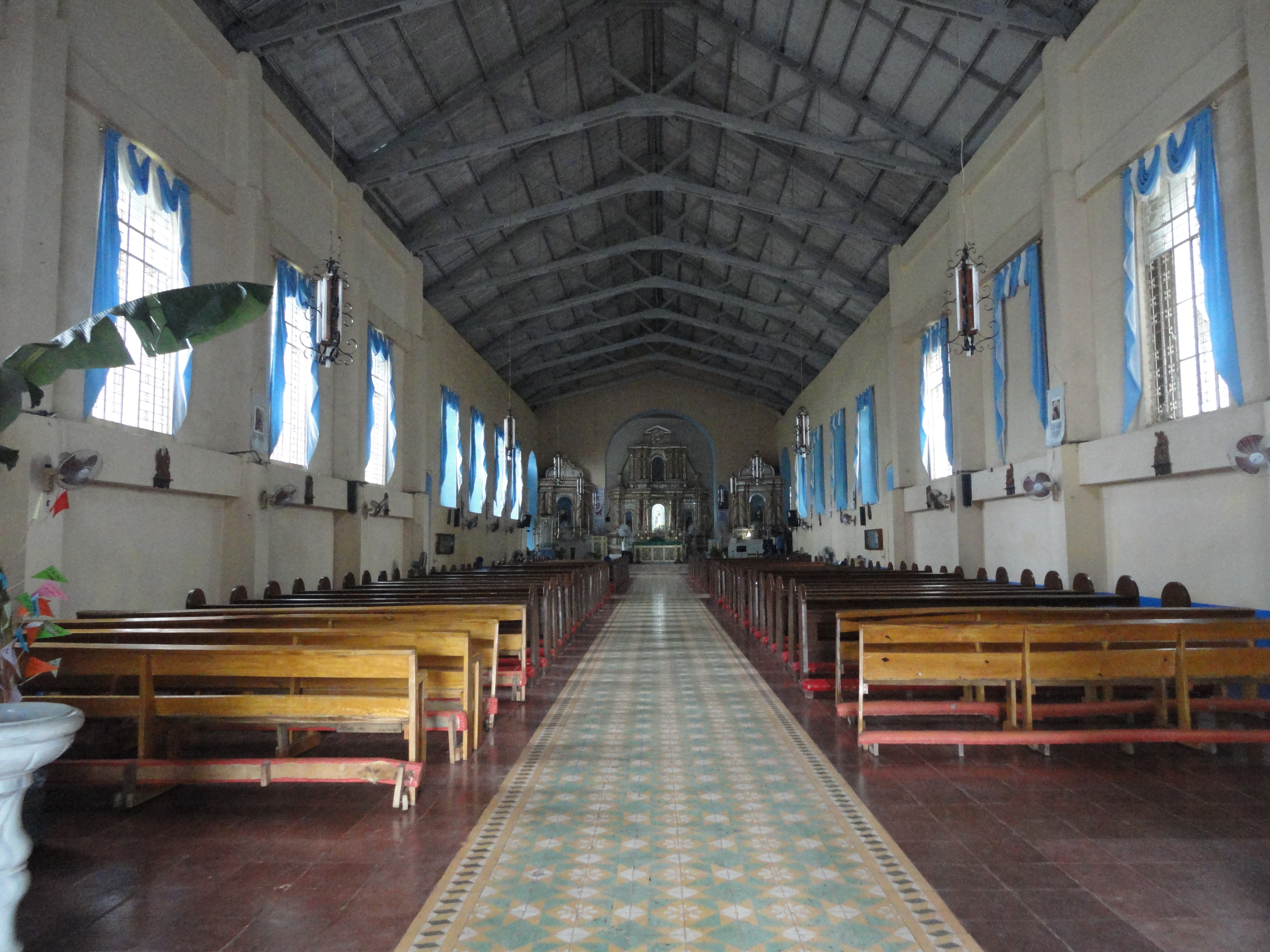
Church interior in 2013

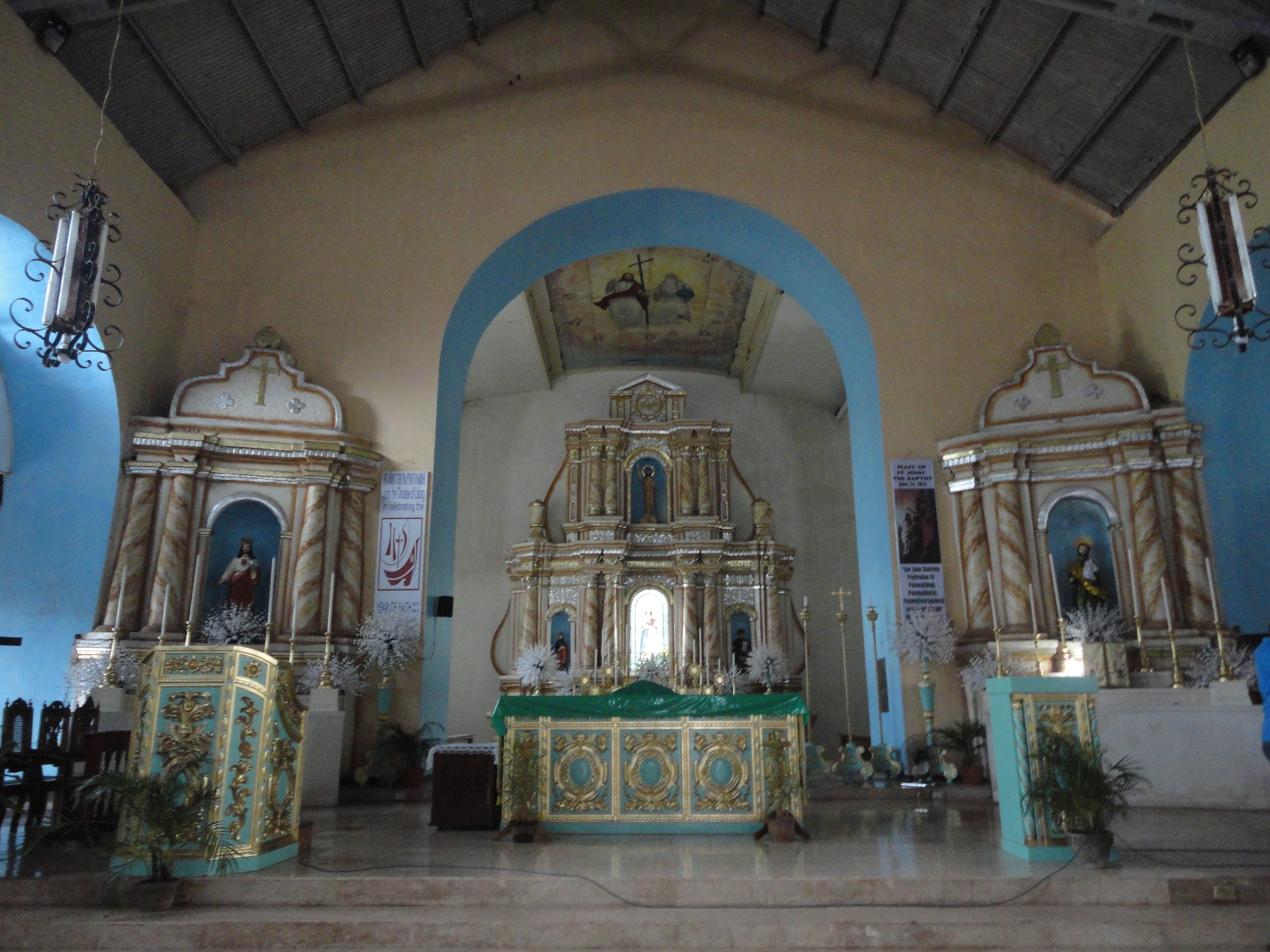
Church sanctuary

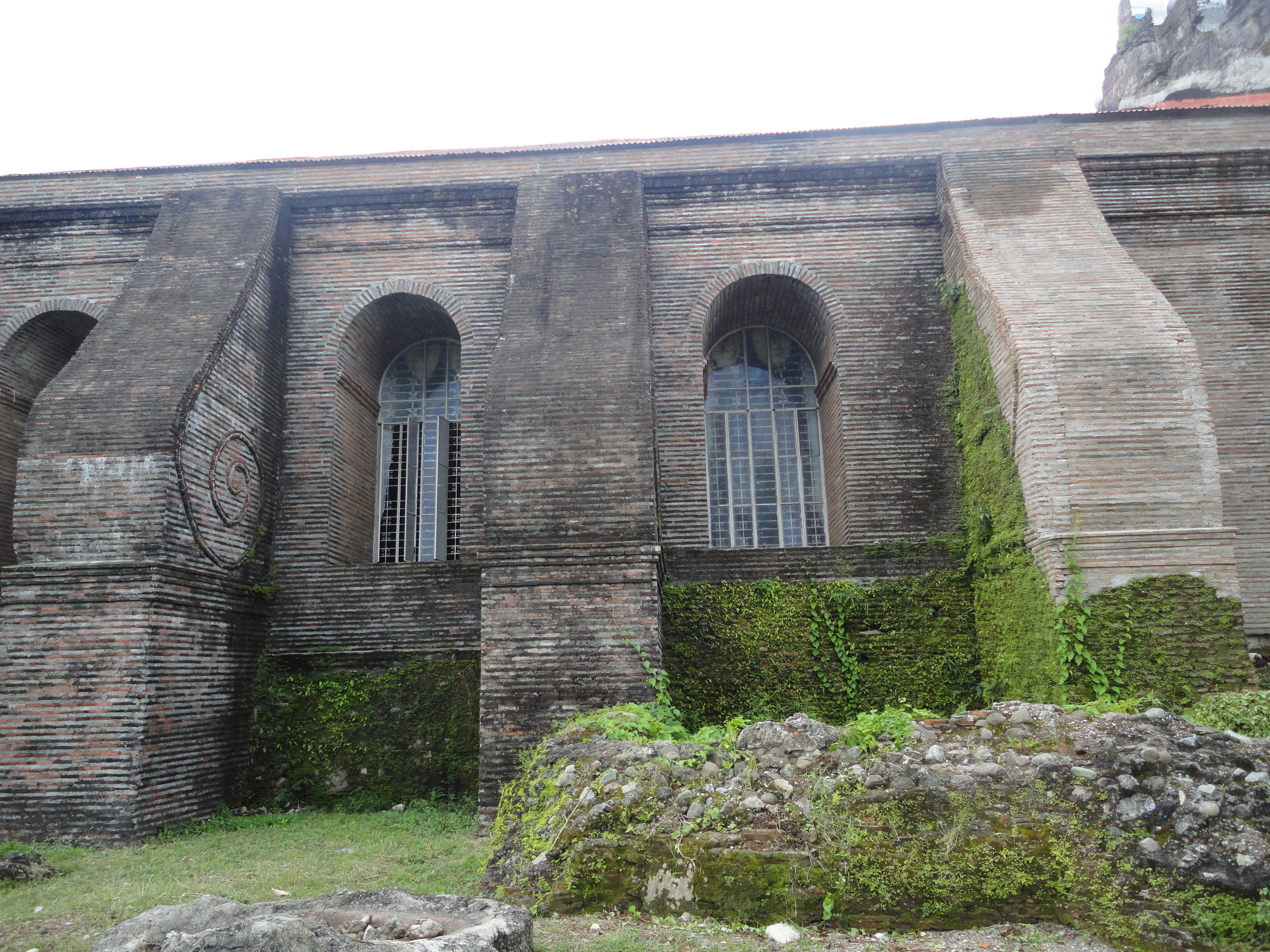
Side walls featuring buttresses
