= Sinait =

Municipality in Ilocos Sur, Philippines

- Municipality
- Municipality of Sinait
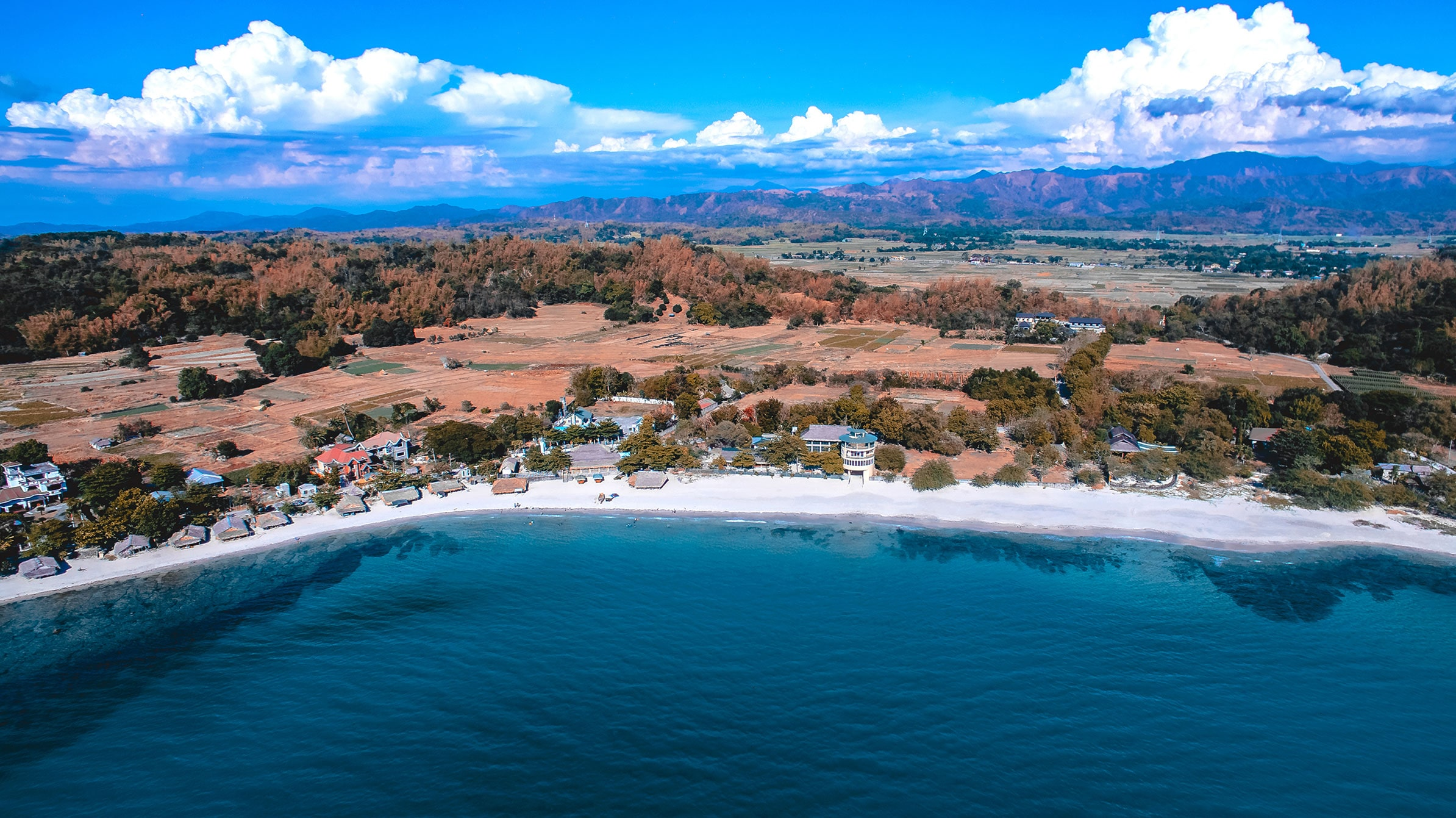
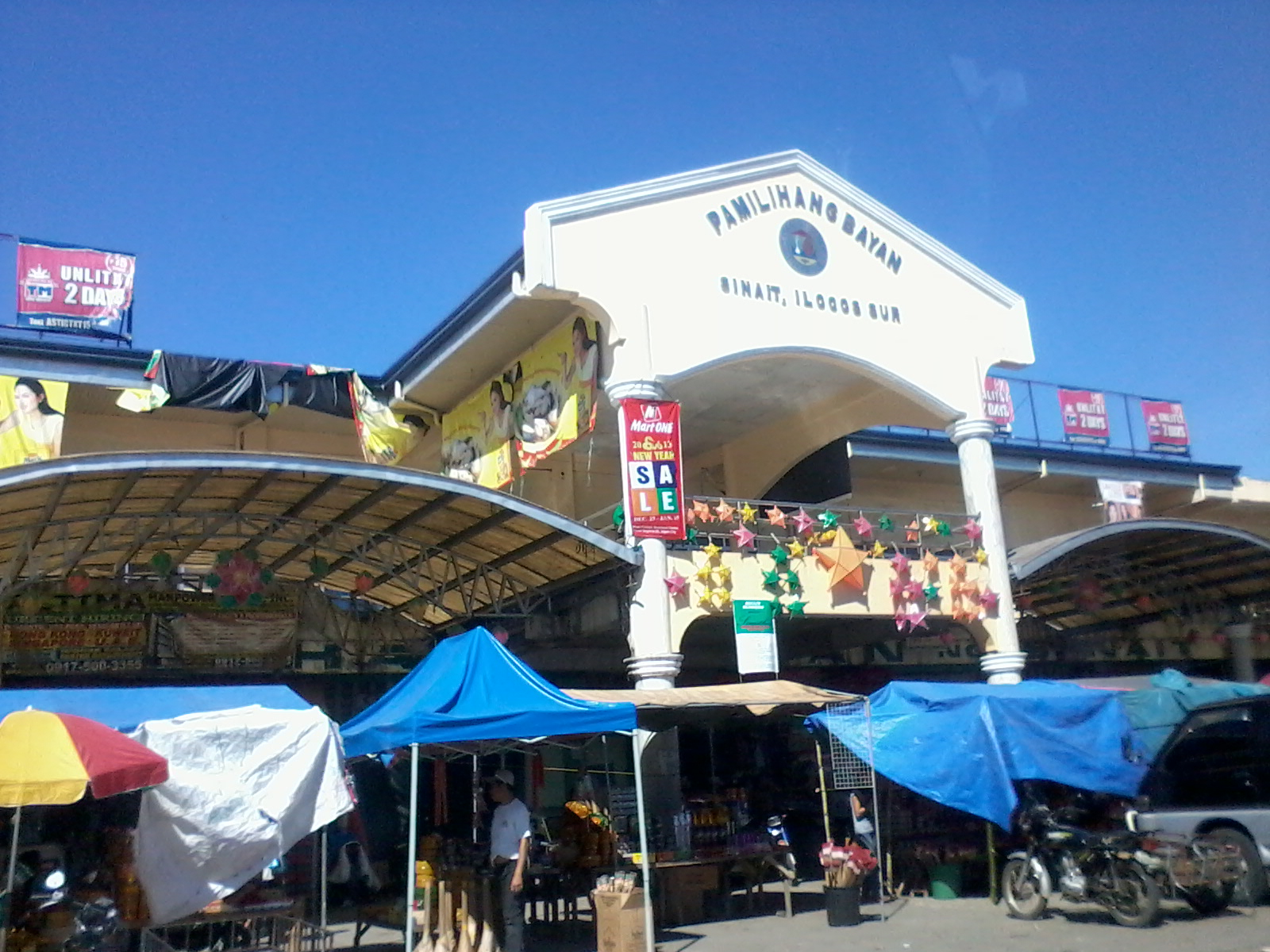
- Cabangtalan beach Floating cottages at Dadalaquiten Sinait Public Market

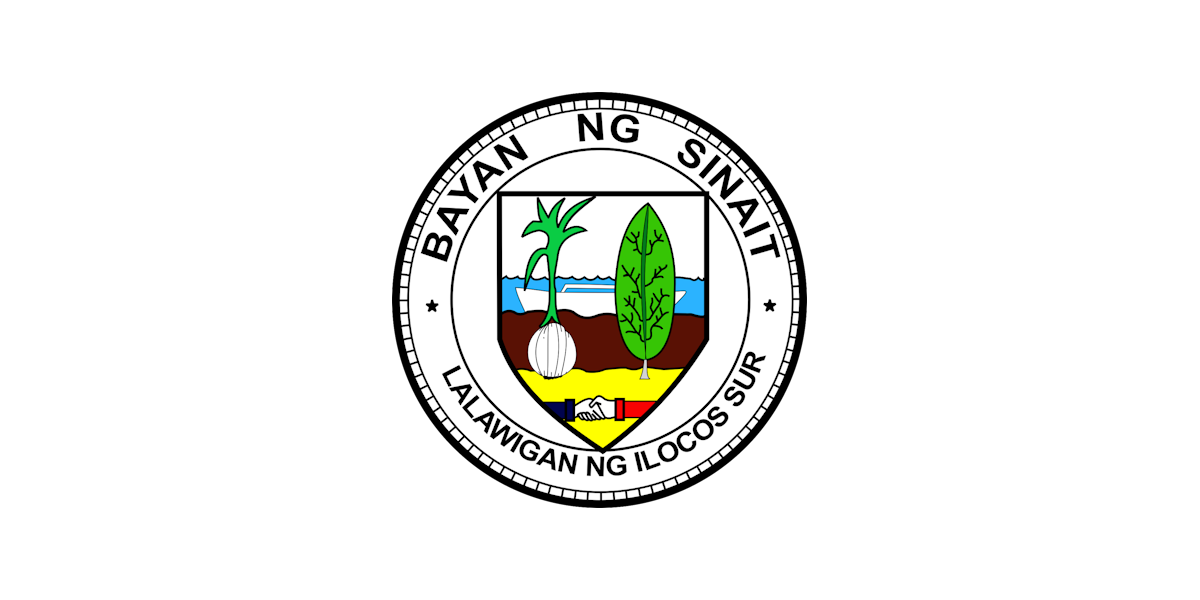
- Flag Seal
- Nickname: Garlic Center of the North
- Motto: Singising Sinait
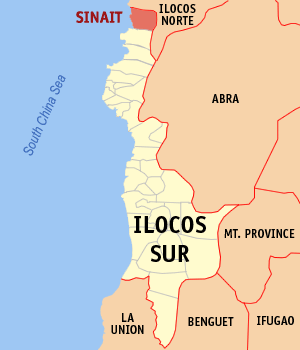
- Map of Ilocos Sur with Sinait highlighted
- Interactive map of Sinait
- Location within the Philippines
- Coordinates: 17°52′00″N 120°27′30″E
- Country: Philippines
- Region: Ilocos Region
- Province: Ilocos Sur
- District: 1st district
- Barangays: 44 (see Barangays)

Government
  - Type: Sangguniang Bayan
  - Mayor: Glenn B. Guzman
  - Vice Mayor: Shee-an C. Guzman
  - Representative: Ronald Singson
  - Municipal Council: Members: Jespher R. Barcelona; Joselito L. Ines; Blayne B. Guzman; Ehlafe Y. Battad; Wilhelmino R. Ibañez; Marlowrie I. Remolacio; Marlon B. Ines; Jojo Q. Yoro
  - Electorate: 19,204 voters (2025)

Area
  - Total: 65.56 km^{2} (25.31 sq mi)
- Elevation: 21 m (69 ft)
- Highest elevation: 223 m (732 ft)
- Lowest elevation: 0 m (0 ft)

Population (2024 census)
  - Total: 26,059
  - Density: 397.5/km^{2} (1,029/sq mi)
  - Households: 6,897

Economy
  - Income class: 1st municipal income class
  - Poverty incidence: 5.36% (2023)
  - Revenue: ₱ 1,222 million (2024)
  - Assets: ₱ 316.6 million (2024)
  - Expenditure: ₱ 460.5 million (2024)
  - Liabilities: ₱ 388.9 million (2024)

Service provider
  - Electricity: Ilocos Sur Electric Cooperative (ISECO)
- Time zone: UTC+8 (PST)
- ZIP code: 2733
- PSGC: 0102930000
- IDD : area code: +63 (0)77
- Native languages: Ilocano; Tagalog

Sinait, officially the Municipality of Sinait (Ilocano: Ili ti Sinait; Filipino: Bayan ng Sinait), is a municipality in the province of Ilocos Sur, Philippines. According to the 2024 census, it has a population of 26,059 people.

== History ==
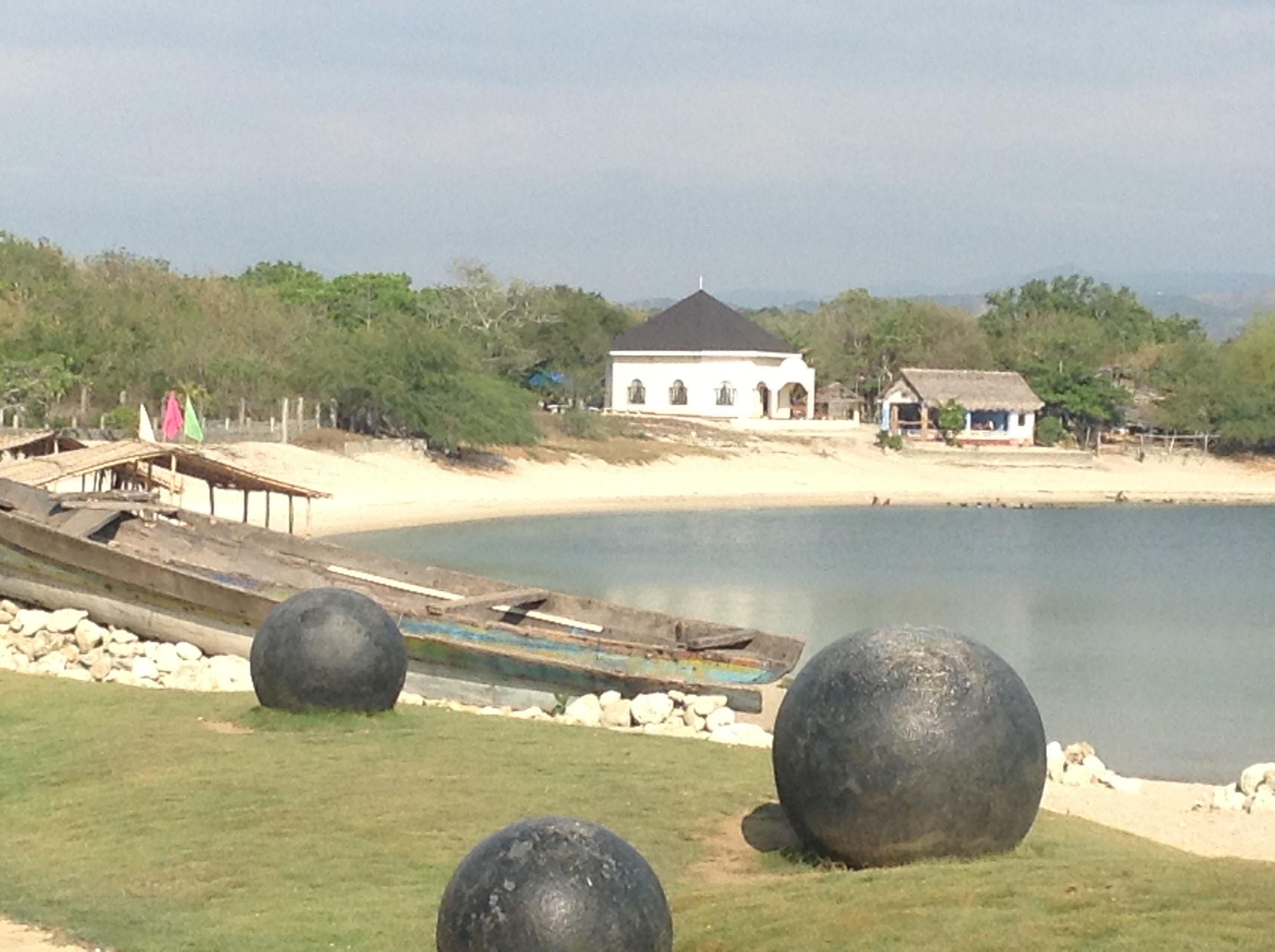
The Chapel of the Santo Cristo Milagroso in Dadalaquiten Norte (the white building), taken from the Chapel of the La Virgen Milagrosa in nearby Paguetpet, Badoc. The body of water in the picture is part of the seashore where the two images were allegedly found floating in a box.

Before Magellan and his expedition reached the Philippines in 1521, the locality was only a small village of little over a hundred natives who were called "Tirongs." By nature, these primitive inhabitants were sea-faring warriors. In their fast and picturesque sailboats, they traveled to adjoining and distant places, most particularly to settlements and villages along the Ilocos Coast in Ilocos Norte, Ilocos Sur, La Union, Pangasinan and even Zambales.

In those adventures, the “Tirongs“ always challenged the people encountered to tribal wars and fought skirmishes against them. Often, those sturdy and brave natives came out victorious. Even in their daily chores, those people showed their ferocious characteristics. When the Spanish came, Juan de Salcedo was sent to explore and colonize the Ilocos territory during the early years of the Spanish regime. He found the “Tirongs” of Sinait in apogee of the social state. Small battles were a daily occurrence so that in the year 1535, when the locality was organized and established as a “Pueblo.”

Salcedo named the new community as “Sin-nait”, a word in the local tongue which means “contest”. As a pueblo, Sinait embraced and included in its territorial limit such distant places as "Rancheria de Paur," now the Municipality of Nueva Era in Ilocos Norte, and southern barrios of Badoc of the same province. The vast territory, however, was reduced to its present 78 square kilometers.

In 1575, the natives fully realized the hardships of pronouncing the term “Sin-nait” and to go away with the trouble, Salcedo declared that one of the letter “N” be dropped. Since then, this Municipality has been called “Sinait”. Nevertheless, it was only in 1913 when the same was officially adopted by the government upon the initiative of Don Calixto Cabacungan. The Municipal Council enacted a resolution to the effect that Sinait was adopted as the official name of the community. This resolution was duly approved by the Provincial Board of Ilocos Sur and by the Philippine Legislature.

=== The Santo Cristo Milagroso ===
Sinait houses the Sanctuary of the Miraculous Statue of the Black Nazarene (El Santo Cristo Milagroso), fondly called by its residents as "Apo Lakay," and a treasure of Ilocandia. History traces the life-sized statue to Nagasaki, Japan. It was probably sent floating in the sea by missionaries operating in secret in Japan to escape the destruction of churches in Nagasaki in 1614 on orders of the Tokugawa Regime. The box was found by local fishermen in the shores of Barangay Dadalaquiten Norte, on the boundary between Sinait and nearby Paguetpet (La Virgen Milagrosa), Badoc, in 1620, and fishermen from both towns carried it ashore. They found two statues inside the box—a statue of the Black Nazarene, and a statue of the Blessed Virgin Mary. According to legend, the fishermen from Sinait mysteriously were unable to move the statue of the Blessed Virgin Mary, but had no problems moving the Statue of the Black Nazarene. The fishermen from Badoc, however, were able to move the Statue of the Blessed Virgin Mary (later called the La Virgen Milagrosa) with ease, as they were unable to carry the image of the Black Nazarene. They took the statues to their respective towns and were venerated. In 1656, with a spreading devotion to the Santo Cristo Milagroso due to its miraculous powers, the Black Crucifix was taken to the capital town of Vigan, since an epidemic was raging there and through the devotion of the faithful, many got cured. Because of this, it is considered as an intercessor of all kinds of affliction and sickness. In 1660, because of the growing veneration to the image, the faithful begun the construction of a permanent edifice to house it. It took the people of Sinait eight years to construct the church with funds provides by the Spanish Audiencia. Today the landing site of Apo Lakay is marked by a chapel at Lugo Beach in Barangay Dadalaquiten Norte, and is a place of pilgrimage for devotees, as with the nearby chapel marking La Virgen Milagrosa's landing site.

== Geography ==
The Municipality of Sinait is bordered by the province of Ilocos Norte by Badoc and Nueva Era to the north, and Cabugao to the south. It is the northernmost municipality of the province.

Sinait is situated 36.06 kilometres (22.41 mi) from the provincial capital Vigan, and 436.99 kilometres (271.53 mi) from the country's capital city of Manila.

=== Barangays ===
Sinait is politically subdivided into 44 barangays. Each barangay consists of puroks and some have sitios.

- Aguing
- Baliw
- Ballaigui (Poblacion)
- Baracbac
- Barikir
- Battog
- Binacud
- Cabangtalan
- Cabarambanan
- Cabulalaan
- Cadanglaan
- Calanutian
- Calingayan
- Curtin
- Dadalaquiten Norte
- Dadalaquiten Sur
- Dean Leopoldo Yabes (Pug-os)
- Duyayyat
- Jordan
- Katipunan
- Macabiag (Poblacion)
- Magsaysay
- Marnay
- Masadag
- Nagbalioartian
- Nagcullooban
- Nagongburan
- Namnama (Poblacion)
- Pacis
- Paratong
- Purag
- Quibit-quibit
- Quimmallogong
- Rang-ay (Poblacion)
- Ricudo
- Sabañgan (Marcos)
- Sallacapo
- Santa Cruz
- Sapriana
- Tapao
- Teppeng
- Tubigay
- Ubbog
- Zapat

=== Climate ===
Climate data for Sinait, Ilocos Sur
Month	Jan	Feb	Mar	Apr	May	Jun	Jul	Aug	Sep	Oct	Nov	Dec	Year
Mean daily maximum °C (°F)	30 (86)	31 (88)	33 (91)	34 (93)	33 (91)	31 (88)	30 (86)	30 (86)	30 (86)	31 (88)	30 (86)	29 (84)	31 (88)
Mean daily minimum °C (°F)	19 (66)	19 (66)	21 (70)	23 (73)	24 (75)	25 (77)	24 (75)	24 (75)	24 (75)	22 (72)	21 (70)	19 (66)	22 (72)
Average precipitation mm (inches)	9 (0.4)	11 (0.4)	13 (0.5)	23 (0.9)	92 (3.6)	122 (4.8)	153 (6.0)	137 (5.4)	139 (5.5)	141 (5.6)	42 (1.7)	14 (0.6)	896 (35.4)
Average rainy days	4.6	4.0	6.2	9.1	19.5	23.2	24.0	22.5	21.5	15.2	10.5	6.0	166.3
Source: Meteoblue (modeled/calculated data, not measured locally)

== Demographics ==
Population census of Sinait

Year	Pop.	±% p.a.
1903	9,157	—
1918	12,335	+2.01%
1939	11,722	−0.24%
1948	12,015	+0.27%
1960	15,170	+1.96%
1970	16,429	+0.80%

Year	Pop.	±% p.a.
1975	17,952	+1.79%
1980	19,050	+1.19%
1990	21,779	+1.35%
1995	22,608	+0.70%
2000	24,070	+1.35%
2007	24,896	+0.47%

Year	Pop.	±% p.a.
2010	25,427	+0.77%
2015	25,640	+0.16%
2020	25,998	+0.29%
2024	26,059	+0.06%

Source: Philippine Statistics Authority

In the 2024 census, Sinait had a population of 26,059 people. The population density was 400 inhabitants per square kilometre (1,000/sq mi).

=== Language ===
Majority of people speak Ilocano language.

== Economy ==
Sinait garlic

Poverty incidence of Sinait (%)

Source: Philippine Statistics Authority

As major producer of garlic, Sinait is also known as the Garlic Center of the North, with a Garlic Festival occurring annually at the beginning of May.

== Tourism ==
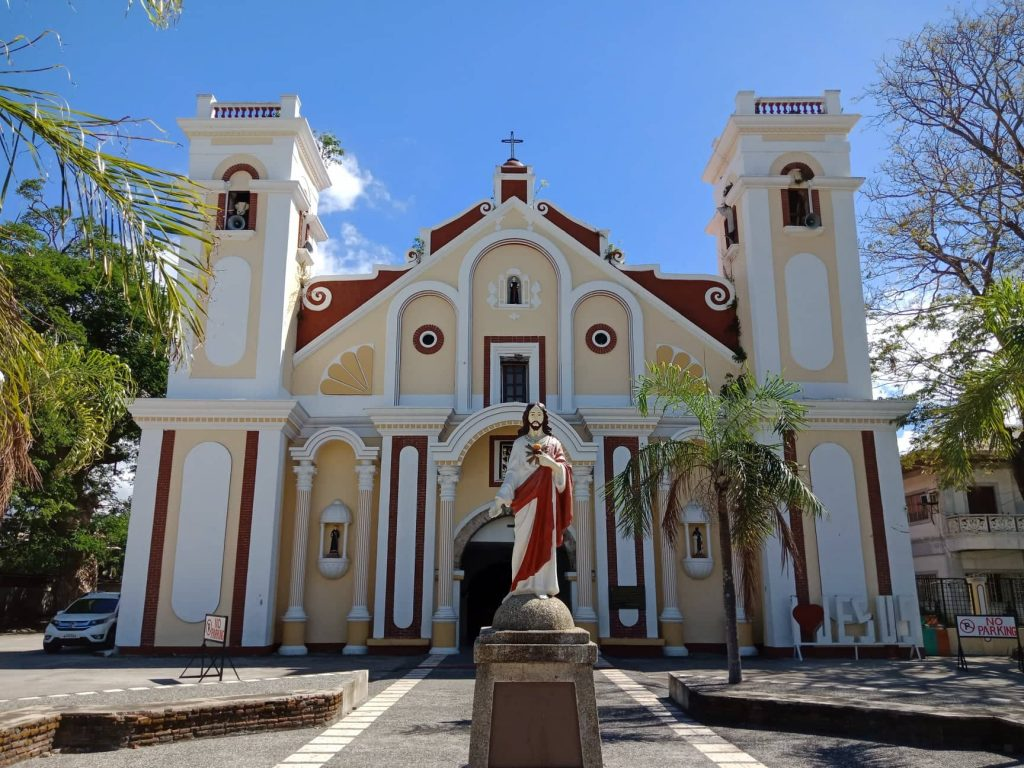
Sinait Basilica

- Cabangtalan (Imelda's Cove) - Features white sand beaches. It is located on the way to Barangay Dadalaquiten Norte and Paguetpet (Badoc).
- Basilica of Saint Nicholas de Tolentino and Shrine of El Santo Cristo Milagroso - A Roman Catholic church, and a minor basilica, that houses the Miraculous Statue of the Black Nazarene (El Santo Cristo Milagroso) or "Apo Lakay." On February 16, 2022, it was officially declared as a minor basilica.
- Barangay Dadalaquiten Norte - The landing place of the Miraculous Statue of the Black Nazarene in 1620, close to the landing place of the La Virgen Milagrosa in neighboring Paguetpet, Badoc, Ilocos Norte.
- Libunao Protected Landscape - A protected watershed area in Barangay Nagcullooban.
- Lugo Beach - A summer destination located at Dadalaquiten Norte, where the Dadalaquiten Floating Cottages are found. The place where the Santo Cristo Milagroso was carried ashore when it was found (with the La Virgen Milagrosa).
- Cabulalaan Hills - A hiking destination.

== Government ==
=== Local government ===
Sinait, belonging to the first congressional district of the province of Ilocos Sur, is governed by a mayor designated as its local chief executive and by a municipal council as its legislative body in accordance with the Local Government Code. The mayor, vice mayor, and the councilors are elected directly by the people through an election which is being held every three years.

=== Elected officials ===
Members of the Municipal Council (2025–2028)
Position	Name
Congressman	Ronald V. Singson
Mayor	Glenn B. Guzman
Vice-Mayor	Shee-an C. Guzman
Councilors	Jespher R. Barcelona
Councilors	King Dave V. Guzman
Councilors	Romel P. Dayoan
Councilors	Joselito L. Ines
Councilors	Jaco Rafael C. Agdeppa
Councilors	Ehlafe Y. Battad
Councilors	Clifford L. Ines
Councilors	Rosemarie C. Ines

== Education ==
The Sinait Schools District Office governs the operations of all educational institutions within the municipality. It oversees all private and public elementary and high schools.

=== Primary and elementary schools ===
- Baracbac-Nagongburan Elementary School
- Barikir Primary School
- Cabarambanan Elementary School
- Cadanglaan Elementary School
- Curtin Primary School
- Dean Leopoldo Yabes Memorial Elementary School
- Katipunan Primary School
- Marnay Elementary School
- Masadag Elementary School
- Sabangan Elementary School
- Sapriana Elementary School
- Sinait East Central School
- Sinait West Central School
- Sinait United Church of Christ in the Philippines Pre-School
- Sta. Cruz Elementary School
- Teppeng Elementary School
- Tubigay Elementary School

=== Secondary schools ===
- Binacud Integrated School
- Dadalaquiten Integrated School
- Sinait National High School
