= Miss Ilocos Norte =

Filipino beauty pageant competition

- Type: Women's beauty pageant
- First edition: 2014
- Most recent edition: 2026
- Current titleholder: Jirah Joy Francisco; Badoc
- Language: Ilocano, English, Filipino

The Miss Ilocos Norte pageant is one of the major pageants of the Ilocos Region, being the provincial pageant of Ilocos Norte primarily held in the month of May. The current titleholder is Jirah Joy Francisco of Badoc, who won its first crown.

== History ==
The pageant was founded in 2014 and was first won by Czarina Marie Adina, Miss Laoag. It is commonly held in the month of May during the La Virgen Milagrosa de Badoc Festival.

== Titleholders ==
Year	Winner	Name
2014	Laoag City	Czarina Marie Adina
2015	Pagudpud	Henna Santos
2016	Dingras	Roxette Gayle de Roxas
2017	Paoay	Dianne Irish Joy Lacayanga
2018	Bacarra	Trisha Carbonell Aceret
2019	Sarrat	Precious Olay Neyra
2021	Pagudpud	Lyza Katrina Samalio
2022	Laoag City	Crisleen Keith Alawag
2023	Dingras	Lovely Demandante
2024	Solsona	Angeline Caraang
2025	Dingras	Jamaica Nicole Mamuad
2026	Badoc	Jirah Joy Francisco

== Rankings ==
City/Municipality	Titles	Years
Dingras	3	2016, 2023, 2025
Laoag	2	2014, 2022
Pagudpud	2	2015, 2021
Badoc	1	2026
Solsona	1	2024
Sarrat	1	2019
Bacarra	1	2018
Paoay	1	2017
