= Badoc =

Municipality in Ilocos Norte, Philippines

- Municipality
- Municipality of Badoc
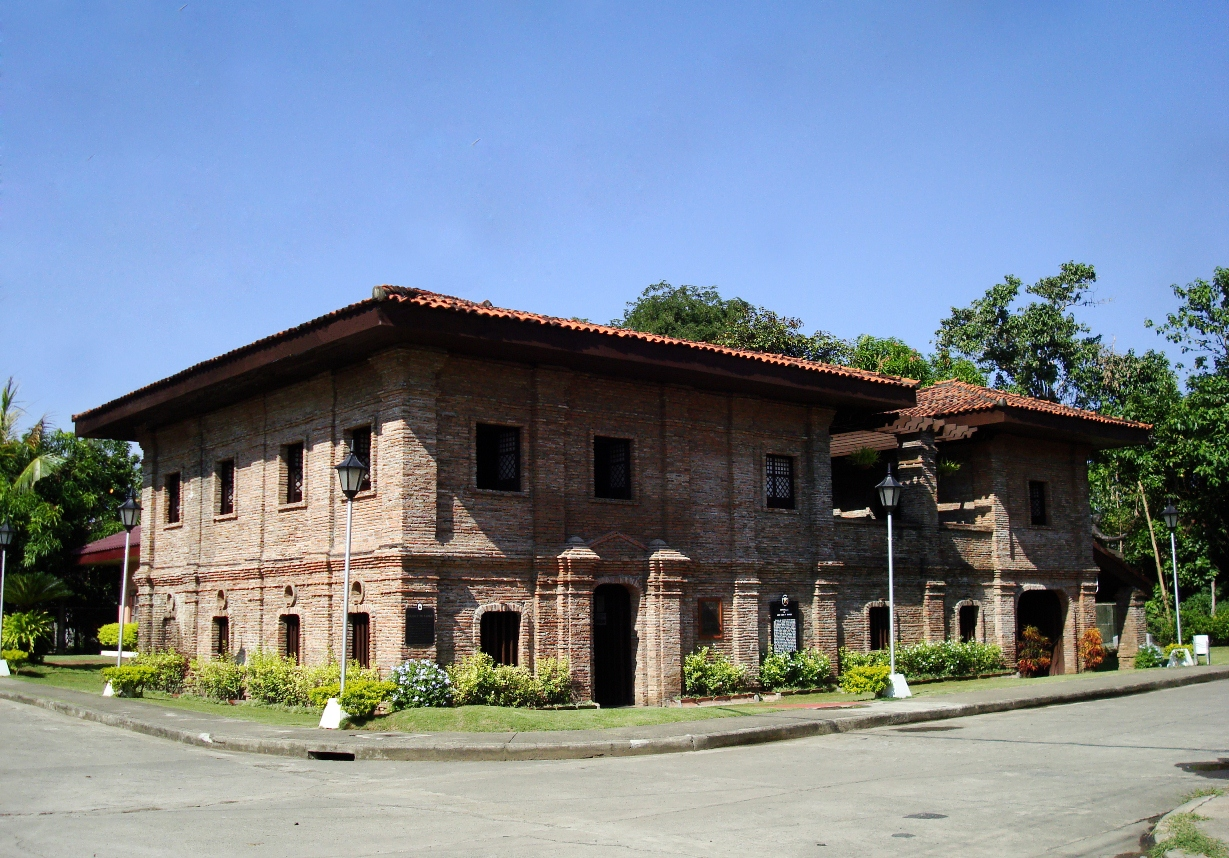
- Juan Luna Shrine

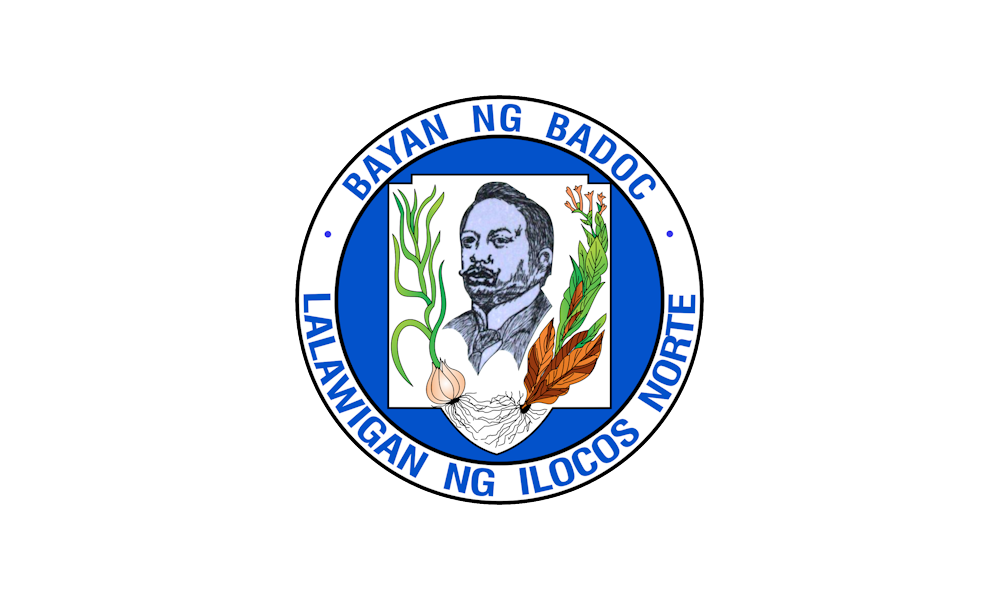
- Flag Seal

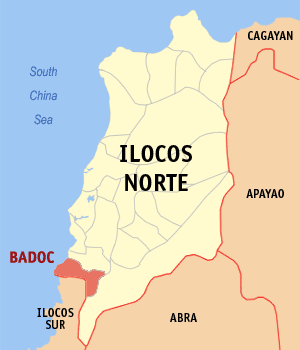
- Map of Ilocos Norte with Badoc highlighted
- Interactive map of Badoc
- Location within the Philippines
- Coordinates: 17°55′36″N 120°28′31″E
- Country: Philippines
- Region: Ilocos Region
- Province: Ilocos Norte
- District: 2nd district
- Barangays: 31 (see Barangays)

Government
  - Type: Sangguniang Bayan
  - Mayor: Virgilio M. Calajate
  - Vice Mayor: Glennd George G. Cajigal
  - Representative: Eugenio Angelo M. Barba
  - Municipal Council: Members: Romnick James M. Torralba; Tom Kristoffer M. Torralba; Mary Pauline M. Lacuesta; Divina Gracia B. dela Cruz; Jake S. Chua; Michael T. Cajigal; Glenn Novan M. Cajigal; Teodoro Y. Calonge
  - Electorate: 22,844 voters (2025)

Area
  - Total: 76.68 km^{2} (29.61 sq mi)
- Elevation: 22 m (72 ft)
- Highest elevation: 245 m (804 ft)
- Lowest elevation: 0 m (0 ft)

Population (2024 census)
  - Total: 32,832
  - Density: 428.2/km^{2} (1,109/sq mi)
  - Households: 8,019

Economy
  - Income class: 1st municipal income class
  - Poverty incidence: 5.56% (2023)
  - Revenue: ₱ 559.5 million (2024)
  - Assets: ₱ 1,208 million (2024)
  - Expenditure: ₱ 358.3 million (2024)
  - Liabilities: ₱ 142.6 million (2024)

Service provider
  - Electricity: Ilocos Norte Electric Cooperative (INEC)
- Time zone: UTC+8 (PST)
- ZIP code: 2904
- PSGC: 0102803000
- IDD : area code: +63 (0)77
- Native languages: Ilocano; Tagalog
- Website: www.badoc.gov.ph

Badoc, officially the Municipality of Badoc (Ilocano: Ili ti Badoc; Tagalog: Bayan ng Badoc), is a municipality in the province of Ilocos Norte, Philippines. According to the 2024 census, it has a population of 32,832 people.

It is the birthplace of Filipino painter, Juan Luna. The tourist spots in this town are Luna Shrine, Luna Park, Badoc Island, Badoc Church and La Virgen Milagrosa Shrine, and the beautiful beaches of La Virgen Migrosa, Gabut Norte, Pagsanahan, Aring, and Saud.

== Etymology ==
In 1572, during the intensive Christianization of the area in what is now the Ilocos Region, a boatload of Spanish missionaries and soldiers stopped at the mouth of the Badoc River to establish camp in the area that is now occupied by the Badoc town proper. It was the only site that was clear of obstructions, apart from a portion that was occupied by fifteen families of natives known as the Isneg..

Around the settlement was a thick growth of tall flowering reed plants called bado-badoc (phleumpratense). Seeing some fishermen lingering at a distance, the Spaniards walked up to them to inquire about the name of the place pointing to the spot which they thought was a settlement. The men, not being able to understand what was asked to them, simply thought that the Spaniards wanted to know the name of the plant around the area and thus the answered: 'bado-badoc'. The leader of the expedition recorded the word, hence the town was called "Badoc"..

== Geography ==
The Municipality of Badoc is considered the southernmost municipality in Ilocos Norte.

Badoc is situated 39.10 kilometres (24.30 mi) from the provincial capital Laoag, and 444.77 kilometres (276.37 mi) from the country's capital city of Manila.

=== Barangays ===
Badoc is politically subdivided into 31 barangays. Each barangay consists of puroks and some have sitios.

- Alay-Nangbabaan
- Alogoog
- Ar-arusip
- Aring
- Balbaldez
- Bato
- Camanga
- Canaan (Poblacion)
- Caraitan
- Gabut Norte
- Gabut Sur
- Garreta (Poblacion)
- La Virgen Milagrosa (Paguetpet)
- Labut
- Lacuben
- Lubigan
- Mabusag Norte
- Mabusag Sur
- Madupayas
- Morong
- Nagrebcan
- Napu
- Pagsanahan Norte
- Pagsanahan Sur
- Paltit
- Parang
- Pasuc
- Santa Cruz Norte
- Santa Cruz Sur
- Saud
- Turod

=== Climate ===
Climate data for Badoc, Ilocos Norte
Month	Jan	Feb	Mar	Apr	May	Jun	Jul	Aug	Sep	Oct	Nov	Dec	Year
Mean daily maximum °C (°F)	30 (86)	31 (88)	32 (90)	34 (93)	33 (91)	31 (88)	30 (86)	30 (86)	30 (86)	31 (88)	30 (86)	29 (84)	31 (88)
Mean daily minimum °C (°F)	19 (66)	19 (66)	21 (70)	23 (73)	24 (75)	25 (77)	24 (75)	24 (75)	24 (75)	22 (72)	21 (70)	19 (66)	22 (72)
Average precipitation mm (inches)	9 (0.4)	11 (0.4)	13 (0.5)	23 (0.9)	92 (3.6)	122 (4.8)	153 (6.0)	137 (5.4)	139 (5.5)	141 (5.6)	42 (1.7)	14 (0.6)	896 (35.4)
Average rainy days	4.6	4.0	6.2	9.1	19.5	23.2	24.0	22.5	21.5	15.2	10.5	6.0	166.3
Source: Meteoblue

== Demographics ==
Population census of Badoc

Year	Pop.	±% p.a.
1903	12,564	—
1918	17,598	+2.27%
1939	13,231	−1.35%
1948	13,573	+0.28%
1960	12,210	−0.88%
1970	19,000	+4.52%
1975	20,805	+1.84%
1980	22,330	+1.42%

Year	Pop.	±% p.a.
1990	25,627	+1.39%
1995	26,737	+0.80%
2000	27,862	+0.89%
2007	30,063	+1.05%
2010	30,708	+0.78%
2015	31,616	+0.56%
2020	32,530	+0.60%
2024	32,832	+0.22%

Source: Philippine Statistics Authority

In the 2024 census, the population of Badoc was 32,832 people, with a density of 430 inhabitants per square kilometre or 1,100 inhabitants per square mile.

== Economy ==
Poverty incidence of Badoc

Source: Philippine Statistics Authority

Badoc's main source of economy is agriculture. Badoc's residents produce staple crops, engage in fishing and make salt. Artisans also produce cloth weaving, basketry, and rope making.

== Tourism ==
=== La Virgen Milagrosa ===
Badoc houses the Sanctuary of the Miraculous Statue of the Blessed Virgin Mary, the La Virgen Milagrosa. History traces the life-sized statue to Nagasaki, Japan. It escaped the destruction of churches in Nagasaki in 1614 on orders of the Tokugawa Bakufu—one of three religious statues that survived the destruction, when it was sent floating in the sea by missionaries operating in secret in Japan, along with the Miraculous Statue of the Black Nazarene (Sinait's Santo Cristo Milagroso). It was first found by local fishermen in the shores of Barangay Dadalaquiten of Sinait, Ilocos Sur and Barangay Paguetpet of Badoc (on the present-day boundary between Ilocos Norte and Ilocos Sur) in the year 1620. Only fishermen from Sinait were able to move the Statue of the Black Nazarene. The fishermen from Badoc, unable to move the Black Nazarene, were able to move the La Virgen Milagrosa that came with it—which was, in turn, unable to be moved by the fishermen from Sinait. They took the statues to their respective towns, hence becoming their patron saints. Today The La Virgen Milagrosa is enshrined at the Badoc Church, as Barangay Paguetpet was renamed in honor of the La Virgen Milagrosa. A chapel was erected near the site where the image landed, which is a stone's throw from the chapel marking the landing site of the Santo Cristo Milagroso.

=== Juan Luna Shrine ===
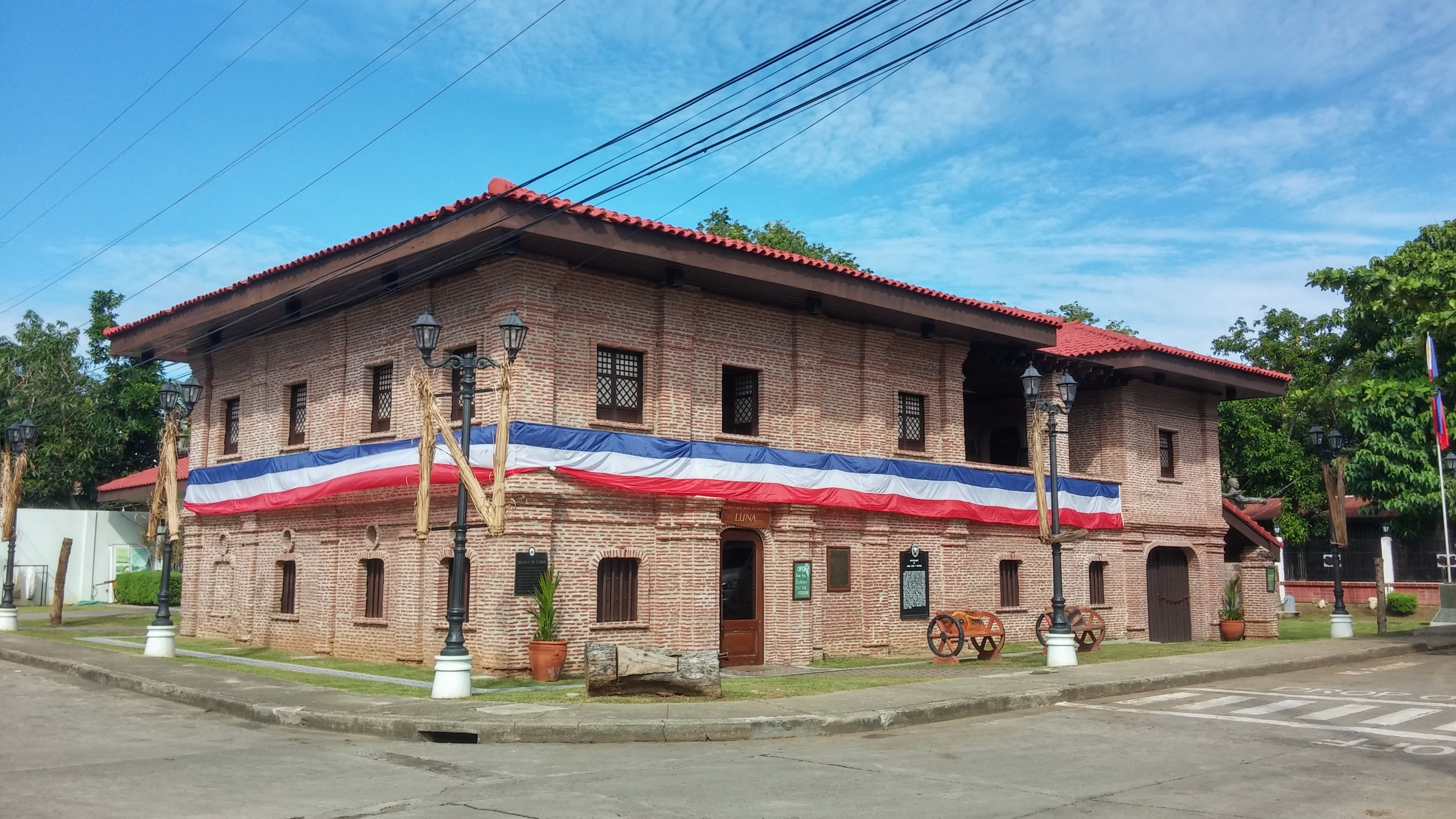
Luna Shrine

The Juan Luna Shrine is the reconstructed two storey ancestral house of the painter Juan Luna, the revolutionary general Antonio Luna, and the violinist Manuel Luna. Built in the typical middle class fashion, the house was burned down in 1861 and was rebuilt using clay bricks and molave wood. Now a museum, the shrine houses photos of the Luna family and reproductions of Luna's paintings. The second floor retains the living room, bedrooms, azotea, and chapel, all furnished with period furniture and accessories.

=== Minor Basilica of Saint John the Baptist ===
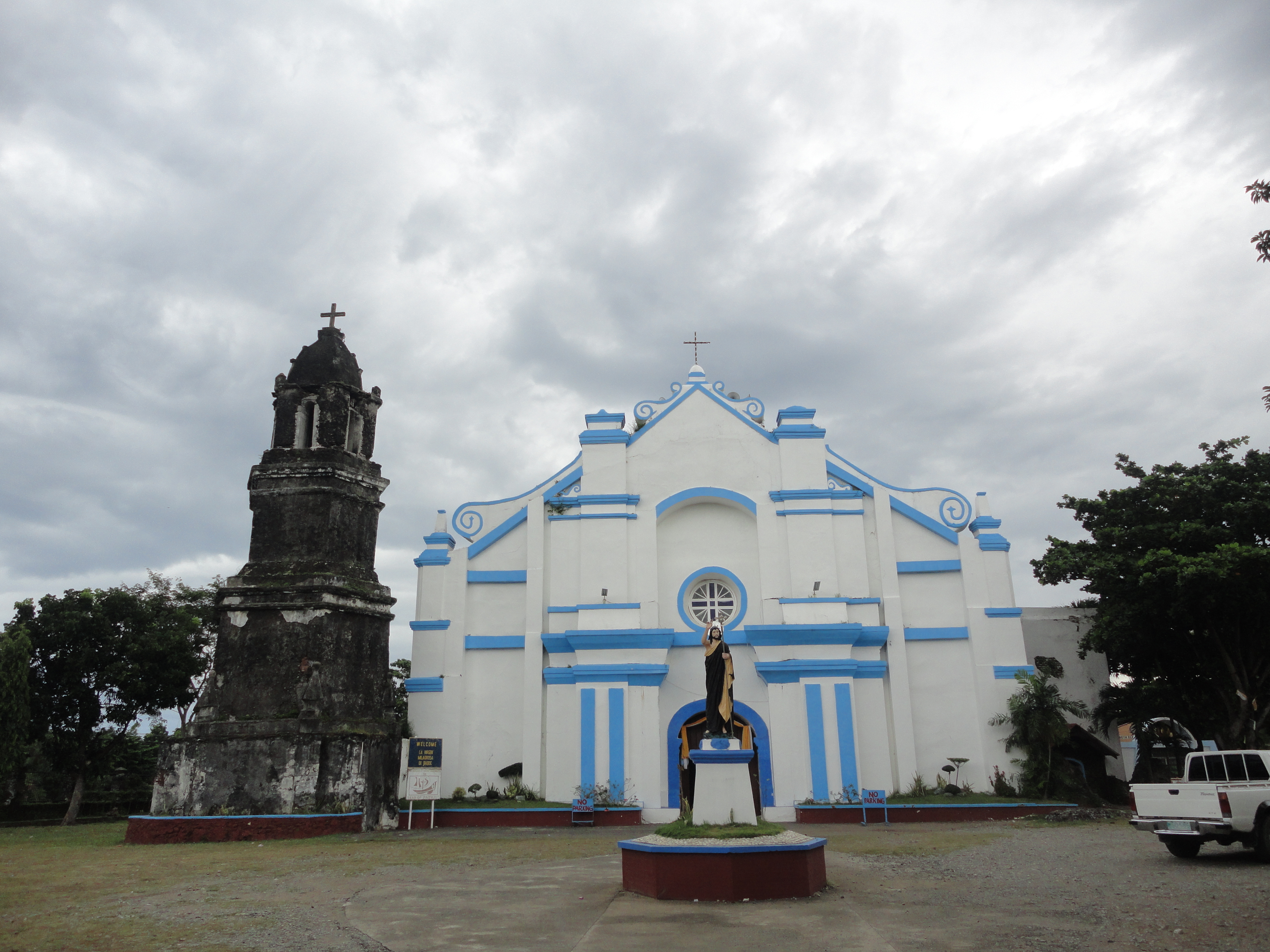
Badoc Church front

Also known as Badoc Basilica, St. John the Baptist Parish Church was constructed in 1591 and was once a chapel under the jurisdiction of Sinait. It was formally recognized as a parish in 1714 with St. John the Baptist as patron saint. The baroque church made of stone blocks and brick tiles is credited to Reverend Father Valentin Blovide. It was occupied by the Sambals during the revolution headed by Andres Malong in 1660–61.

The celebrated Philippine painter Juan Luna was baptized in Badoc Church on 27 October 1857. At present, the church houses the miraculous statue of the Blessed Virgin Mary venerated under the title Virgin of Miracles, crowned by Catholic bishops in 1980, and was granted a Canonical coronation by Pope Francis on 31 May 2018. On November 30, 2018, the parish was elevated to the level of a Minor Basilica. The elevation rites took place on February 5, 2019.

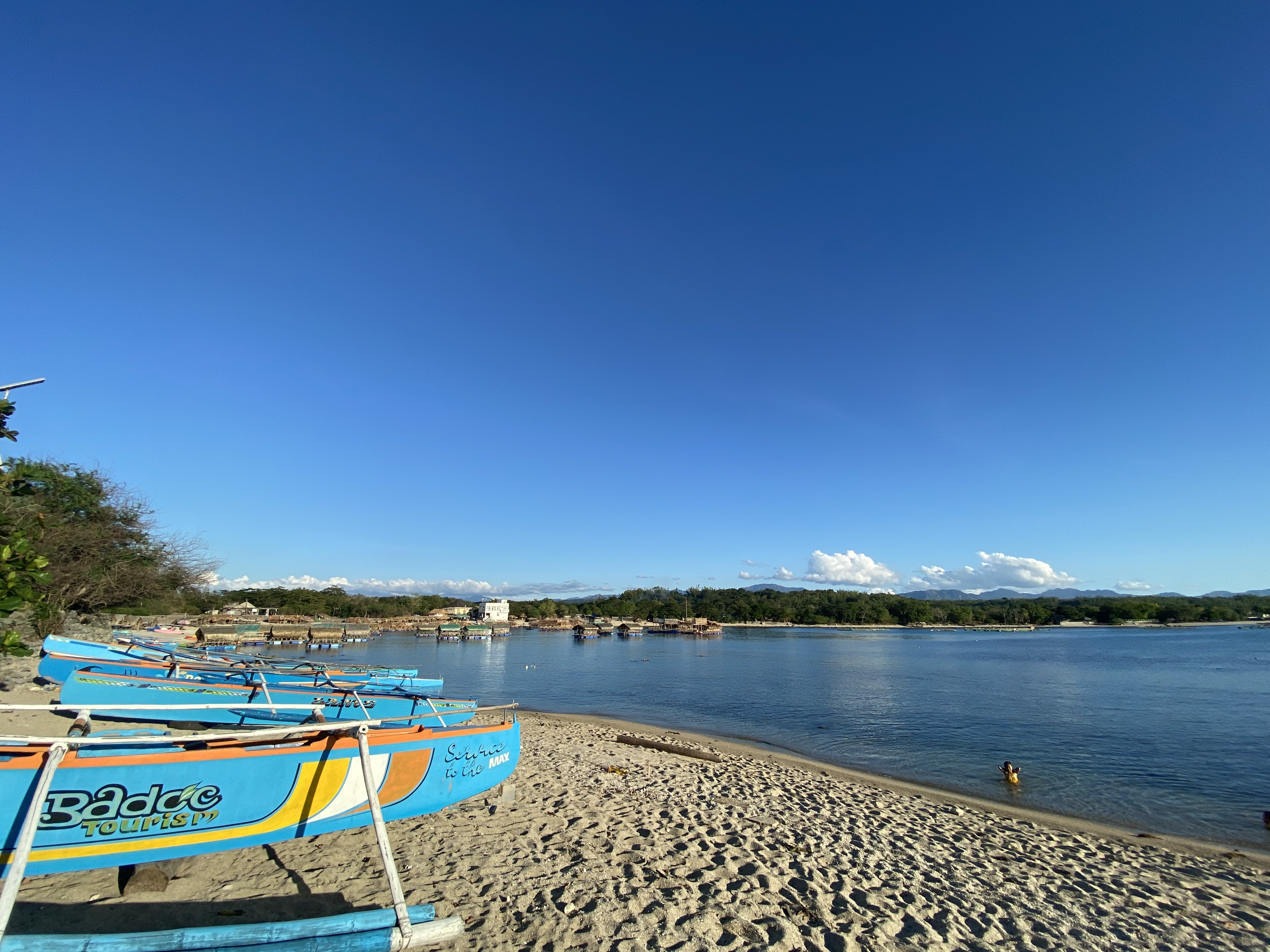
Coastline at La Virgen Milagrosa

=== Floating Cottages at La Virgen Milagrosa ===
Another tourist attraction of this place is the floating cottage that is made out of bamboos and hays, with plastic drums as its floaters. Rentals for the floating cottages are about P500 for every 4 hours, and P100 for every one-hour extension. 15-20 persons are the maximum capacity per floating cottage.

=== Badoc Island ===
Badoc Island is an uninhabited island located about 1 kilometre (0.62 mi) off the shore of Barangay Pagsanahan in Badoc, Ilocos Norte, Philippines. The island is a popular surfing spot in northern Philippines.

=== Beaches ===
There are five popular public beaches in Badoc. 1) La Virgen Milagrosa Beach 2) Gabut Norte Beach 3) Pagsanahan Beach 4) Aring and Saud Beach 5) Pagsanahan Secret Beach

=== Food ===
Miki (Comfort Noodle Soup Dish), Ilocos Empanada, Longanisa and Iloco Vinegar are the local foods you can find in this town.

== Government ==
=== Local government ===
Badoc, belonging to the second congressional district of the province of Ilocos Norte, is governed by a mayor designated as its local chief executive and by a municipal council as its legislative body in accordance with the Local Government Code. The mayor, vice mayor, and the councilors are elected directly by the people through an election which is being held every three years.

=== Elected officials ===
Members of the Municipal Council (2025–2028)
Position	Name
Congressman	Eugenio Angelo M. Barba
Mayor	Virgilio M. Calajate
Vice-Mayor	Glennd George G. Cajigal
Councilors	Romnick James M. Torralba
Councilors	Tom Kristoffer M. Torralba
Councilors	Mary Pauline M. Lacuesta
Councilors	Divina Gracia B. dela Cruz
Councilors	Jake S. Chua
Councilors	Michael T. Cajigal
Councilors	Glenn Novan M. Cajigal
Councilors	Teodoro Y. Calonge
ABC President	John Marck T. Cajigal
SK Federated President	Jamaila Aira S. Paguyo

== Education ==
The Badoc Schools District Office governs all public and private elementary and high schools within the municipality.

=== Primary and elementary schools ===
- Ar-Arusip Elementary School
- Aring Elementary School
- Badoc Little Angels Learning Center
- Badoc North Central School
- Badoc South Central School SPED Center
- Camanga Elementary School
- Gabut Elementary School
- Labut Elementary School
- Lasien School
- Mabusag-Napu Elementary School
- Mabusag Sur Elementary School
- Madupayas Elementary School
- Morong Elementary School
- Nagrebcan Elementary School
- Pagsanahan Elementary School
- Paltit Elementary School
- Pasuc-Parang Elementary School
- Saud Elementary School
- St. Elizabeth Elementary School
- Sta. Cruz Elementary School
- Turod Elementary School
- Virgen Milagrosa Elementary School

=== Secondary schools ===
- Caraitan Integrated School
- Nagrebcan National High School
- Pagsanahan National High School

=== Higher educational instititions ===
- Badoc Junior College
- Igama Colleges Foundation
- Juan Luna Memorial Academy

== Notable people ==
- Juan Luna, Artist
