= Bigbiga Protected Landscape =

Protected area in Ilocos Sur, Philippines

- IUCN category V (protected landscape/seascape)
- Location within Luzon Location within Philippines
- Location: Ilocos Sur, Philippines
- Nearest city: Vigan
- Coordinates: 17°28′54″N 120°32′59″E
- Area: 135.71 hectares (335.3 acres)
- Established: August 16, 1939 (Watershed forest reserve); April 23, 2000 (Protected landscape)
- Governing body: Department of Environment and Natural Resources

The Bigbiga Protected Landscape (also spelled Bigbigga) is a protected landscape of forested hills, open grasslands and natural springs in Ilocos Sur in the northwestern part of the island of Luzon, Philippines. It is one of five protected landscape areas in the Ilocos Region under the Philippines' National Integrated Protected Areas System. The park has a total area of 135.71 hectares (335.3 acres) located entirely within the municipality of Narvacan. It was created in 1939 as the Bigbiga Spring Watershed Forest Reserve by virtue of Proclamation No. 431 signed by President Manuel Luis Quezon. In 2000, it was reclassified as a protected landscape by Proclamation No. 290.

== Description ==
Bigbiga extends from the village of Cadacad to Sitio Mata in the village of Marozo in eastern Narvacan near its border with Nagbukel municipality. It is hilly to mountainous with slope ranging from 30 to 50 percent and maximum elevation of between 100 metres (330 ft) and 200 metres (660 ft) above sea level. Fifty percent of the area is bushland with the remaining area consisting of open grassland. Letac Creek borders it to the south which supplies water to the three sitios of Marozo.

The landscape is covered primarily by shrubs and commercial tree species such as tuai, kalumpit, dao and balete tree. The open grassland supports gmelina and mahogany.

Access to the park is via Orence Road from the main highway (Manila North Road) and Narvacan town proper in the west. It is located approximately 12 kilometres (7.5 mi) from Narvacan Poblacion, about 40 kilometres (25 mi) south of the provincial capital city of Vigan, and some 380 kilometres (240 mi) north of Manila.

== See also ==
- Northern Luzon Heroes Hill National Park
- Santa Lucia Protected Landscape
