= Great Santa Cruz Island =

Inhabited island in the Philippines

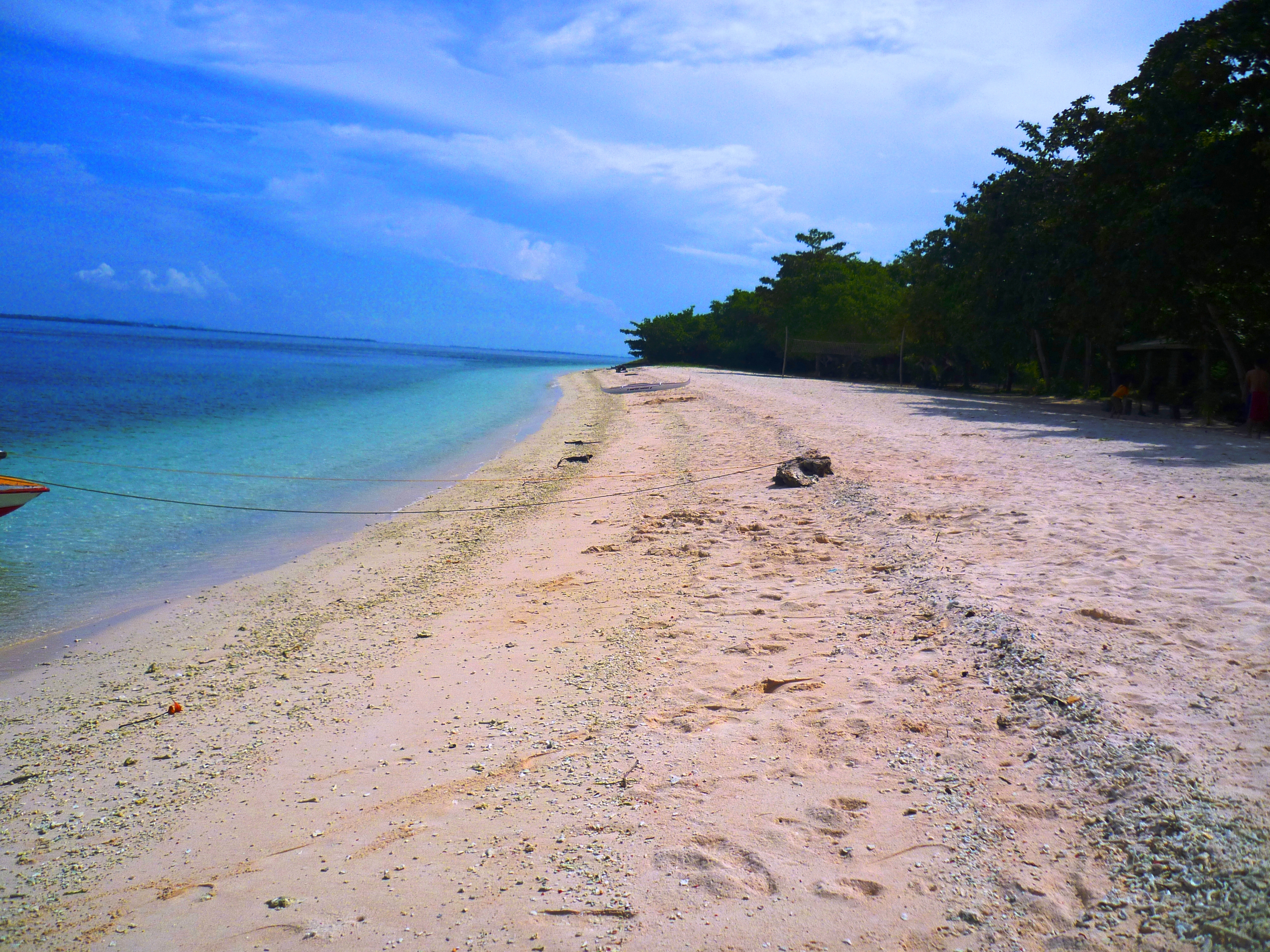
- The pink sands of the island

- Location within Philippines

Geography
- Location: Santa Cruz Bank, Basilan Strait
- Coordinates: 6°51′55″N 122°3′45″E
- Archipelago: Santa Cruz Islands
- Adjacent to: Sibuguey Bay; Sulu Sea
- Length: 2.6 km (1.62 mi)
- Width: 1.5 km (0.93 mi)
- Coastline: 6.6 km (4.1 mi)

Administration
- Philippines
- Region: Zamboanga Peninsula
- City: Zamboanga City

Demographics
- Population: Unknown
- Ethnic groups: Sama-Bajau

Additional information

Great Santa Cruz Island is a small inhabited island in Zamboanga City in the southern region of the Philippines that is famous for its pink coralline sand. The island, located 4 kilometres (2.49 mi) south of downtown at the Santa Cruz Bank in the Basilan Strait, boasts one of the pink sand beaches in the Philippines. The color of the sand comes from the pulverized red organ pipe coral from eons of surf erosion mixed with the white sand.

The island started to become popular since the 1970s and early 1980s when it was frequented by German, Japanese and Italian tourists. Recently, there's an upsurge of tourists that has been recorded due to its rising popularity as one of a handful of Pink Sand Beaches in the World and is the only one in Asia. In 2017, it was recognized by National Geographic as one of the 21 Best Beaches in the World.

== Conservation ==
The Great Santa Cruz Island together with Little Santa Cruz Island are protected areas in Region 9 of the Philippines. Jointly called the Great and Little Sta. Cruz Islands Protected Landscape & Seascape, it was declared as such on April 23, 2000, with the signing of Proclamation No. 271. The park has a total area of 1,877 hectares (4,640 acres).

Recent illegal coral reef mining has destroyed most of Great Santa Cruz Island's vast coral reef population leaving the former colorful corals as dead skeletal reefs. The city government of Zamboanga is planning to improve the island for the preservation, protection, conservation and rehabilitation of the island's ecosystem. The plan also involves developing the island for ecotourism. The improvement would include rehabilitating the present structures on the island. New infrastructures that need to be constructed would be low in profile using materials indigenous to the area, in hope of lessening its impact to the environment. The development plan is expected to be completed in 3 to 5 years time.

== Getting to the island ==
A trip to the island is booked at the tourism office inside the Paseo del Mar park and activity center.

Boats to Santa Cruz Island depart from and return to the Paseo del Mar jetty. Each way is a 15-minute trip.

All visitors must attend a short pre-trip briefing by tourism and environment staff at Paseo del Mar detailing the rules on the island, including prohibitions on taking sand, seashells and corals, as well as prohibitions on bringing single-use plastic items (like food wrappers and packaging) and PET bottles.

Santa Cruz Island is part of the Great and Little Santa Cruz Islands Protected Landscape and Seascape, managed by the local government to preserve its pristine environment and promote sustainable tourism. Visitors can learn about the island's biodiversity and conservation efforts while enjoying its natural attractions.

== Gallery ==
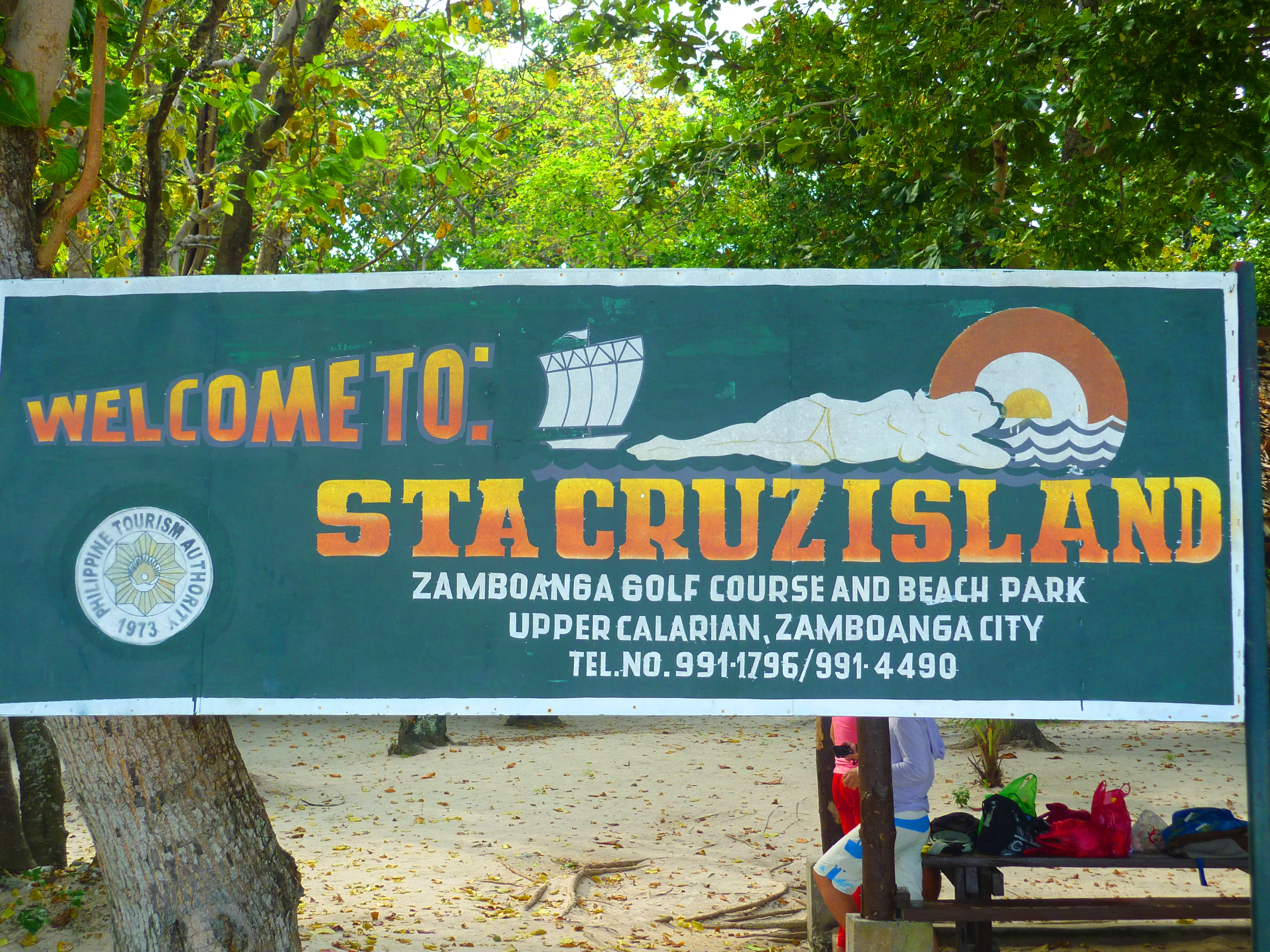
Welcome sign

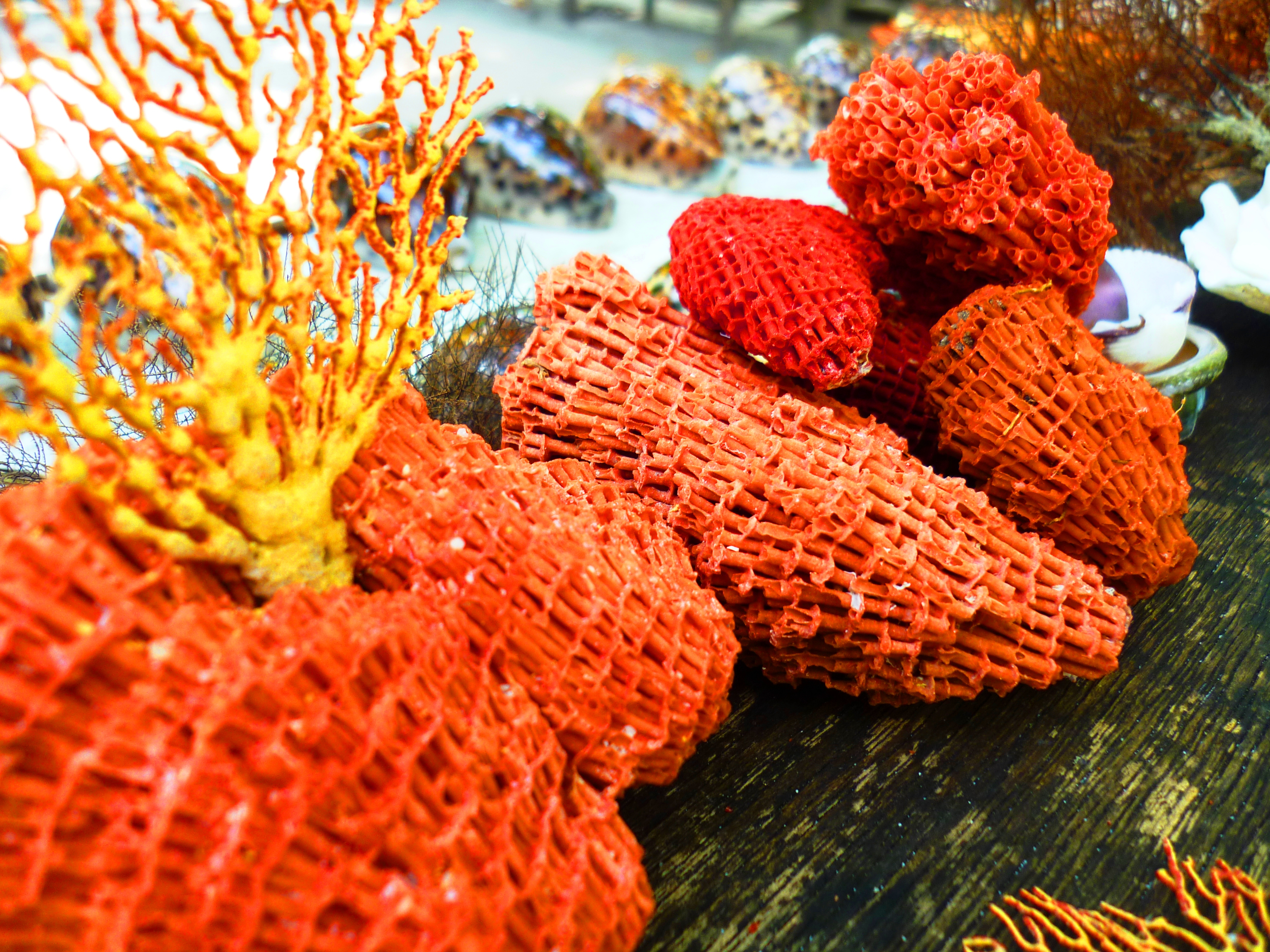
An organ pipe coral from offshore, the coral that gave the sand its pink color

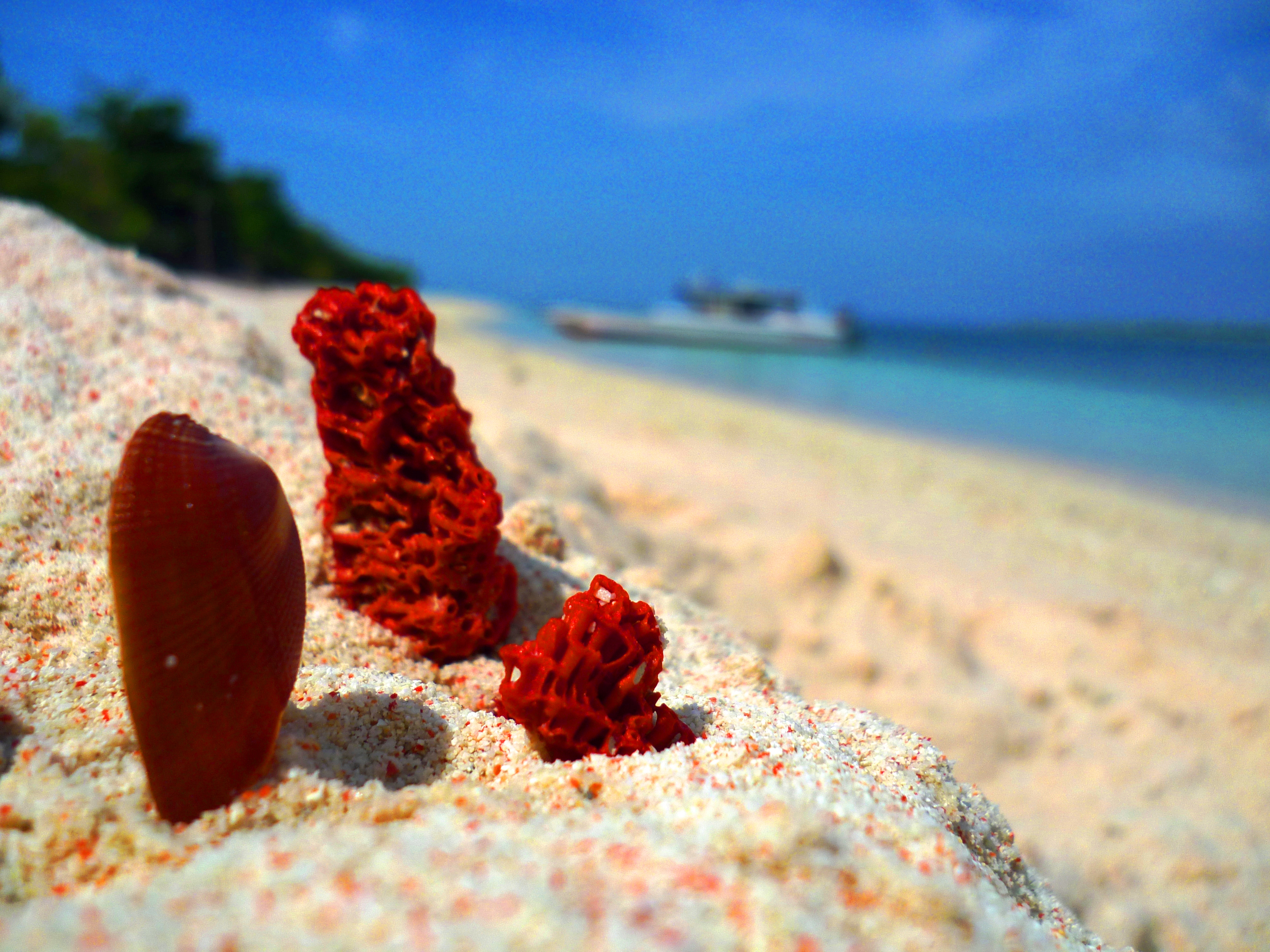
Corals

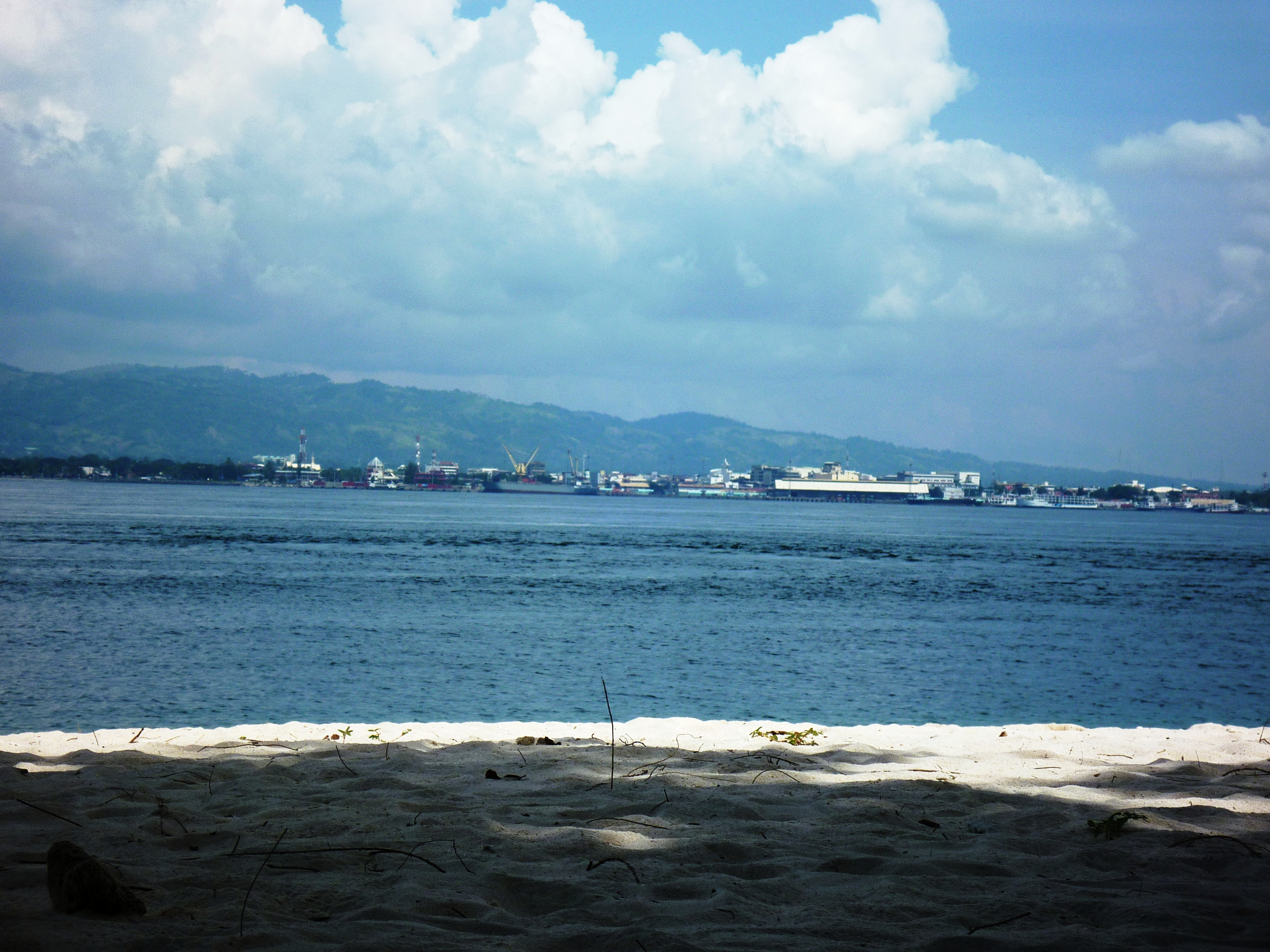
Zamboanga City proper as seen from the island

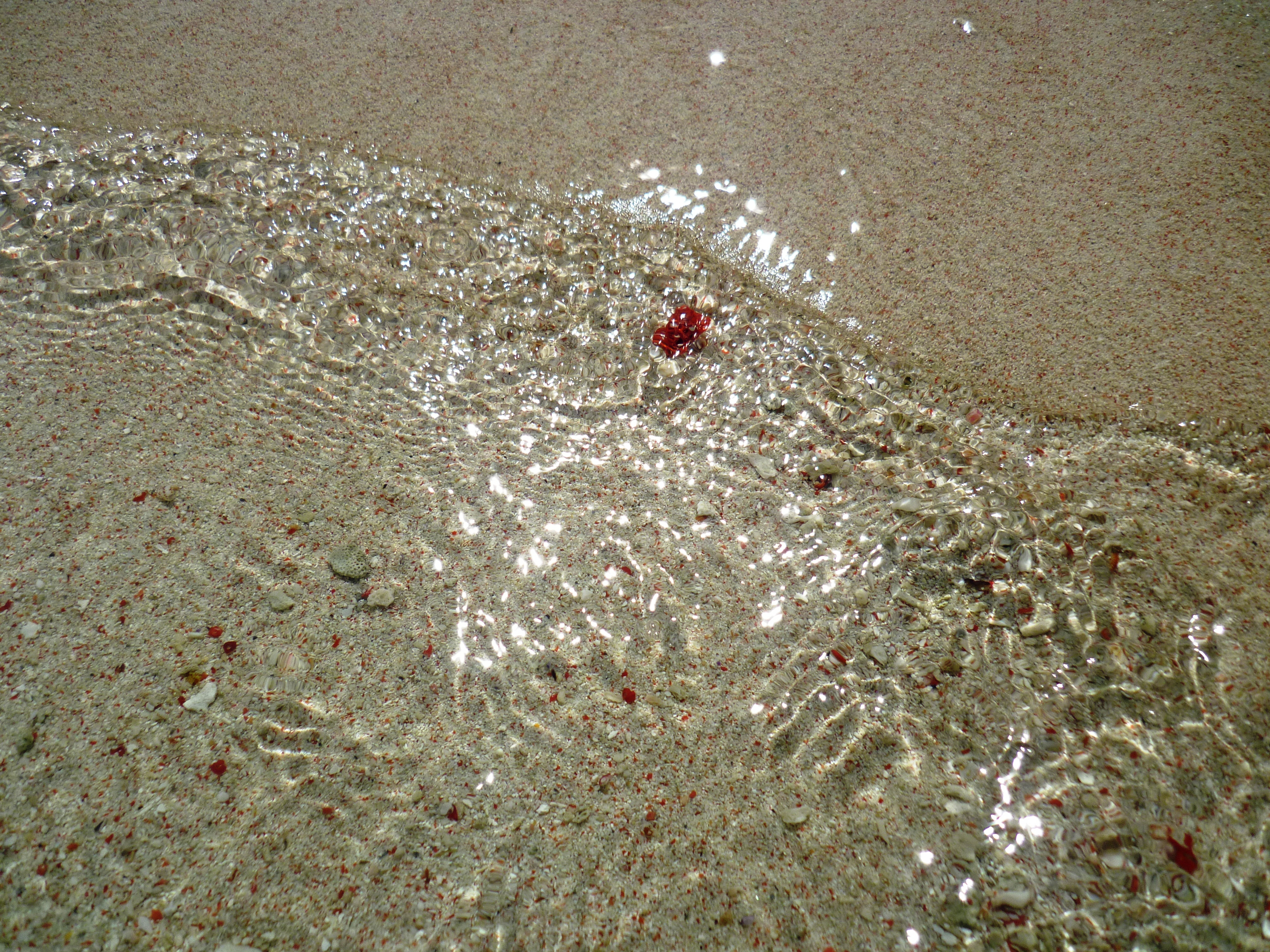
Marine life

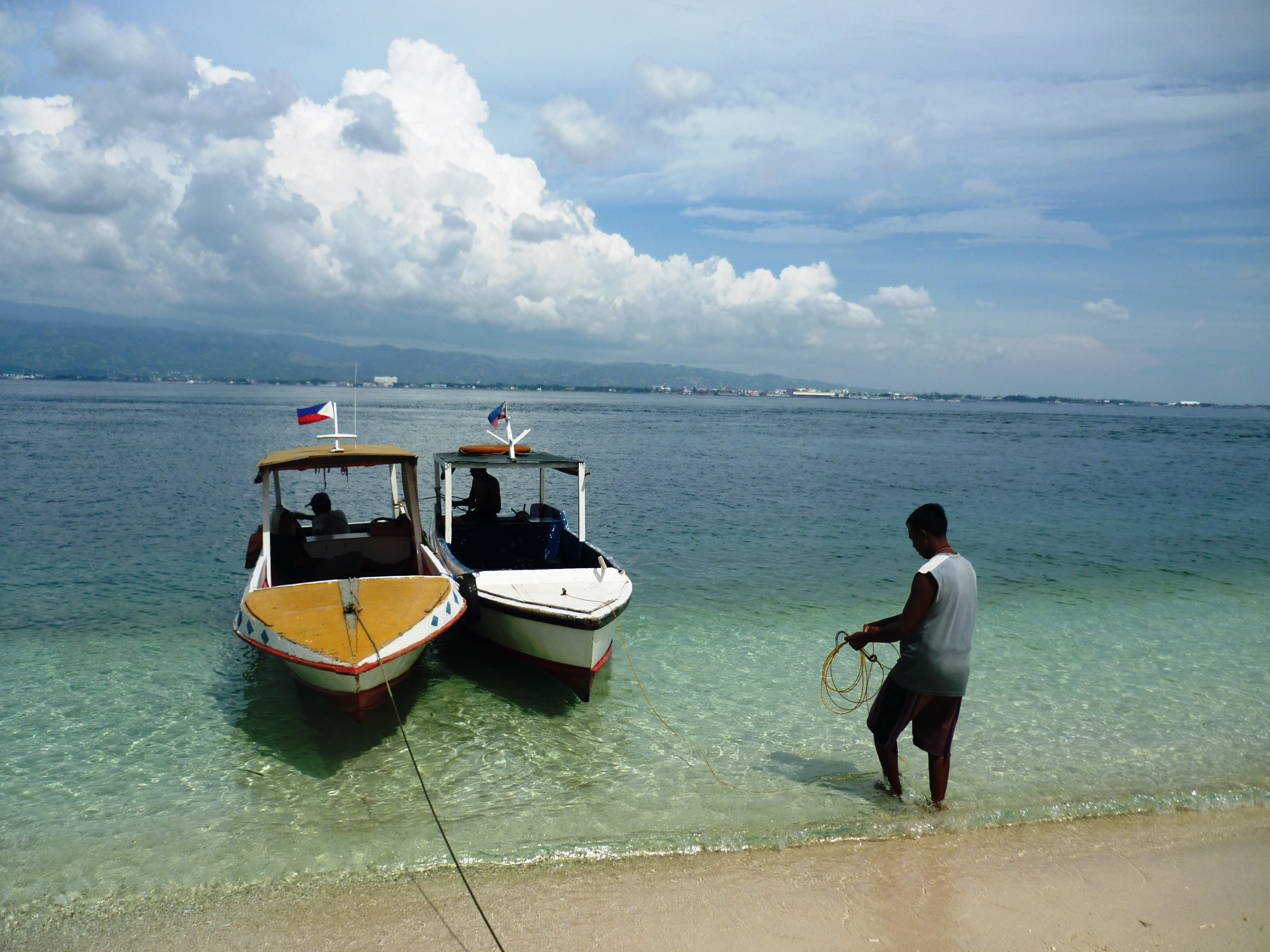
Transportation to the island

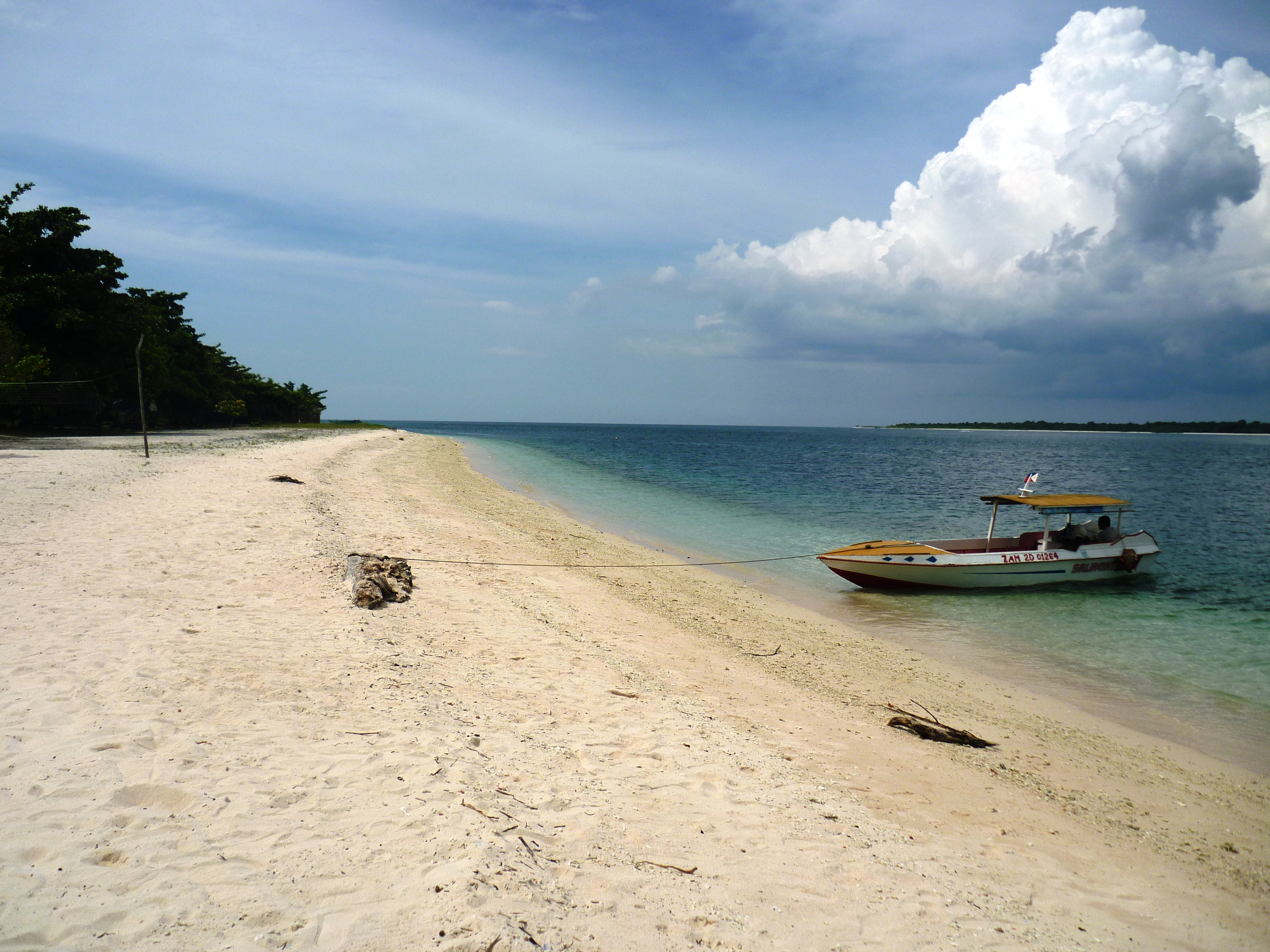
Pink sands of the island

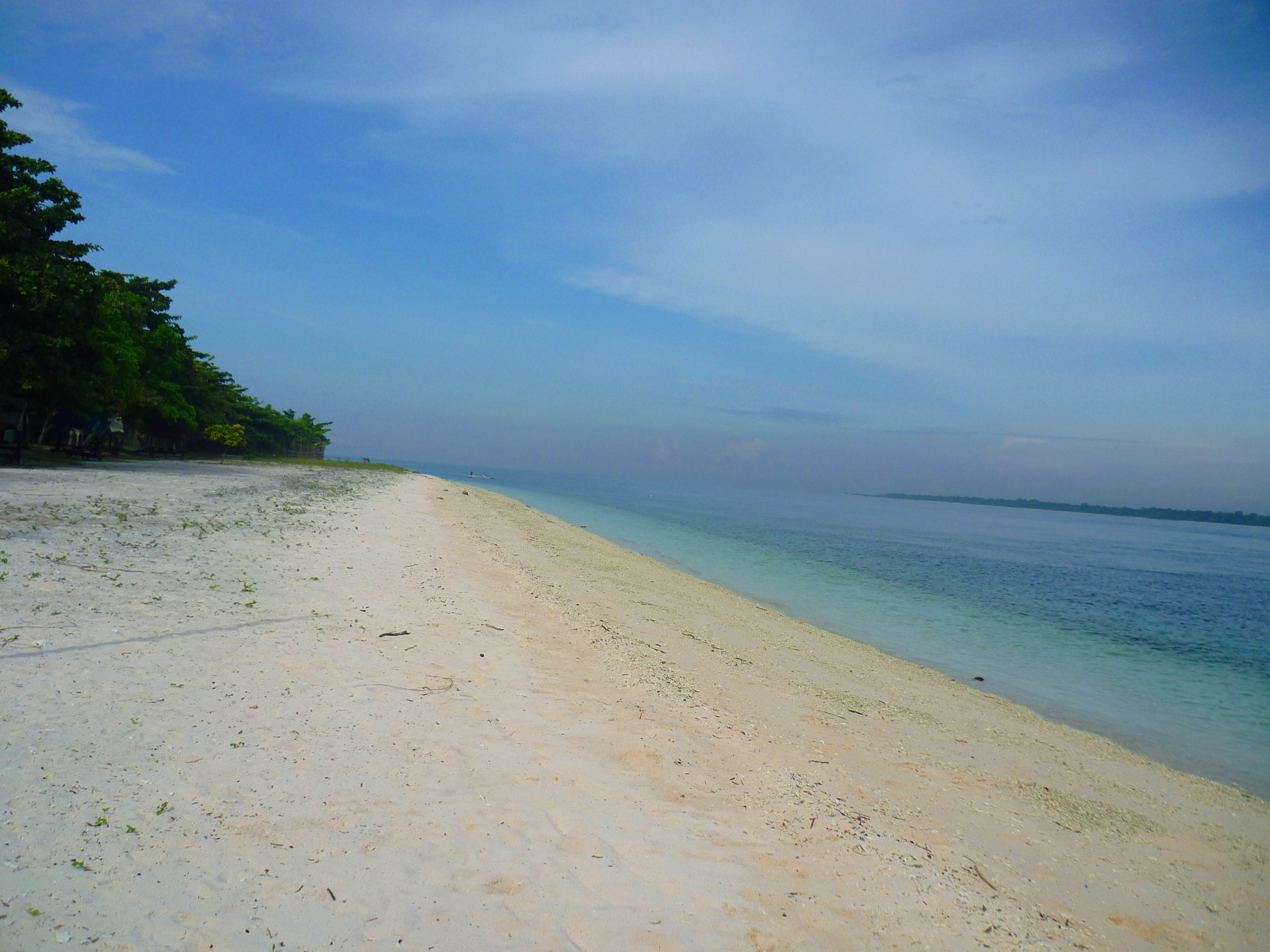
View of the island

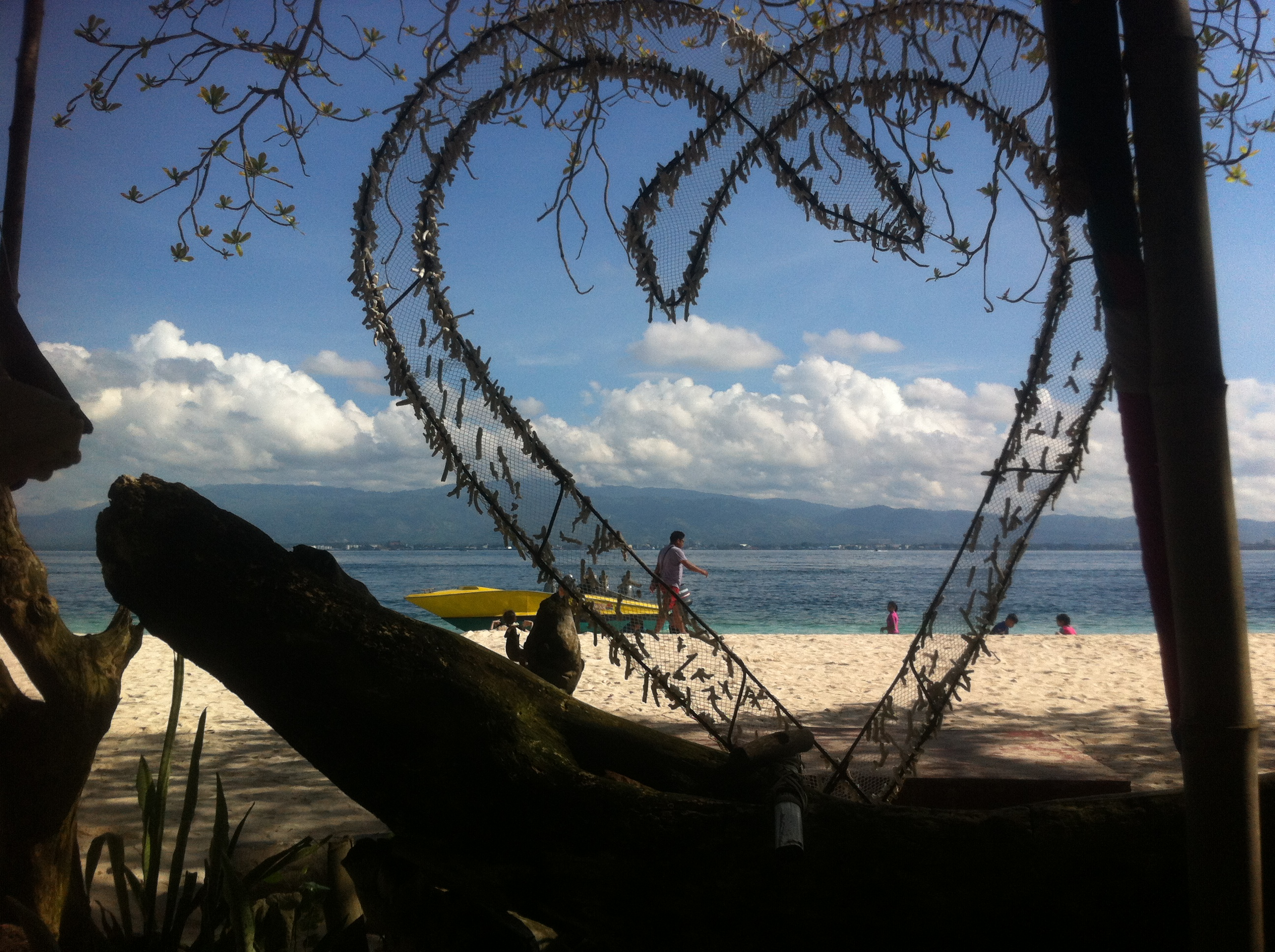
The heart-shaped figure near the "Welcome sign"

== See also ==
- List of protected areas of the Philippines
- List of islands in the Philippines
