= Lidlidda Protected Landscape =

- Lidlidda–Banayoyo Protected Landscape
- IUCN category V (protected landscape/seascape)
- Location within Luzon Location within Philippines
- Location: Ilocos Sur, Philippines
- Nearest city: Candon
- Coordinates: 17°15′27″N 120°32′4″E
- Area: 1,157.44 hectares (2,860.1 acres)
- Established: August 17, 1936 (Watershed forest reserve); April 23, 2000 (Protected landscape)
- Governing body: Department of Environment and Natural Resources

The Lidlidda Protected Landscape, also known as the Lidlidda–Banayoyo Protected Landscape, is a protected area of natural springs and surrounding mountain forests in Ilocos Sur on the island of Luzon in the Philippines. It is an important watershed providing the agricultural and household water requirements of the communities in the municipalities of Lidlidda and Banayoyo. It was established in 1936 as the Lidlidda Watershed Forest Reserve through Proclamation No. 79 signed by President Manuel Luis Quezon with an initial area of 1,228 hectares (3,030 acres). In 2000, under the National Integrated Protected Areas System, it was redesignated as a protected landscape area covering its present size of 1,157.44 hectares (2,860.1 acres).

== Description ==
The Lidlidda protected landscape area includes parts of the upland municipalities of Lidlidda and Banayoyo, as well as a small portion of the municipality of San Emilio in Ilocos Sur. It contains several natural springs, waterfalls, rivers, creeks and streams including the Lidlidda and Candon rivers, as well as the Danglas, Cabunao and Laolaoed creeks. It has a mountainous topography of 30%-50% steep slopes with the highest elevation at 400 metres (1,300 ft) above sea level. Its soil composition is classified as brown sandy loam. The park also includes the 40-hectare (99-acre) conservation area known as Paraesus Verde (Green Paradise) managed by the local government unit of Lidlidda in Poblacion Norte.

Among the tree species found in the area are teak, molave, raintree, tibig, akleng parang and narra.

The park is accessible via the Santiago–Banayoyo–Lidlidda–San Emilio–Quirino National Road from the main highway of the Manila North Road in Santiago just north of Candon. It can also be accessed from the city of Vigan in the north via the Santa Maria–Burgos Road.

== See also ==
- Libunao Protected Landscape
- Bessang Pass Natural Monument
