= Santa Lucia Protected Landscape =

Protected area in Ilocos Sur, Philippines

- IUCN category V (protected landscape/seascape)
- Location within Luzon Location within Philippines
- Location: Ilocos Sur, Philippines
- Nearest city: Candon
- Coordinates: 17°9′1″N 120°32′50″E
- Area: 174.16 hectares (430.4 acres)
- Established: October 18, 1938 (Watershed forest reserve); April 24, 2000 (Protected landscape)
- Governing body: Department of Environment and Natural Resources

The Santa Lucia Protected Landscape, also known as the Salcedo Protected Landscape, is a protected area located in the foothills of the Cordillera Central mountain range in the Ilocos Sur province of the Philippines. It protects an important watershed that serves as the water source for the surrounding communities in the municipality of Salcedo. It had an initial area of 174 hectares (430 acres) proclaimed as the Santa Lucia Watershed Forest Reserve in 1938 through Proclamation No. 333 issued by President Manuel Luis Quezon. In 2000, the forest reserve was reestablished as a protected landscape area under the National Integrated Protected Areas System with the signing of Proclamation No. 296 by President Joseph Estrada.

== Description ==
The Santa Lucia Protected Landscape encompasses an area of 174.16 hectares (430.4 acres) in the rural barangay of Balidbid in Salcedo municipality (formerly Baugen). It was named after the nearby municipality of Santa Lucia when Balidbid was still under the jurisdiction of the municipality. The protected area is located on the north bank of the Buaya River. It is bordered on the north by the barangay of Calangcuasan, on the east by Madarang and Bago Creek, on the south by the Buaya River, and on the west by the lowlands of Salcedo's poblacion.

The Salcedo–Gregorio del Pilar Road runs along the park's southern portion. It is accessible via the Santa Lucia–Salcedo Road from the main highway (Manila North Road) in the west, and via the Candon–Galimuyod–Salcedo–del Pilar Road from the city of Candon in the northwest.

== See also ==
- Libunao Protected Landscape
- Lidlidda Protected Landscape
