= Libunao Protected Landscape =

Protected area in Ilocos Region, Philippines

- Libunao Spring Protected Landscape
- IUCN category V (protected landscape/seascape)
- Location within Luzon Location within Philippines
- Location: Ilocos Sur, Philippines
- Nearest city: Vigan
- Coordinates: 17°51′11″N 120°31′17″E
- Area: 46.7 hectares (115 acres)
- Established: October 2, 1931 (Watershed forest reserve); April 23, 2000 (Protected landscape)
- Governing body: Department of Environment and Natural Resources

The Libunao Protected Landscape, also known as the Libunao Spring Protected Landscape, is a protected area in the Ilocos Region of the island of Luzon in the Philippines located on the western foothills of the Ilocos Mountain Range. It protects the Libunao Spring and surrounding forests, as well as the Nagcullooban River watershed. First proclaimed as the Libunao Spring Watershed Forest Reserve in 1931 through Proclamation No. 410 issued by Governor-General Dwight F. Davis, the park was reestablished as a protected landscape area under the National Integrated Protected Areas System in 2000 through Proclamation No. 280 signed by President Joseph Estrada. The Libunao watershed is the source of water supply for domestic use and irrigation of the surrounding farms and communities of northern Ilocos Sur province.

== Description ==
The protected landscape area of Libunao covers an area of 46.7 hectares (115 acres). It encompasses parts of the municipalities of Sinait and Cabugao, from the rural Sinait village of Nagcullooban up to the Cabugao sitio of Caset in Barangay Maradodon. It has an average slope of between 18% and 50% steepness with a soil condition consisting of clay loam. The park is located approximately 15 kilometres (9.3 mi) from the poblacion or town proper of Sinait and Cabugao and some 36 kilometres (22 mi) north of the provincial capital and heritage city of Vigan. It is one of four protected watershed landscape areas in Ilocos Sur.

Libunao is covered primarily with cogon grass and giant reed. Its lowland forest contains some leguminous tree species such as mango, narra, mahogany, bangkal, acacia, ipil-ipil, duhat, akleng parang, elemi, tibig, hauili, anabiong and molave.

== See also ==
- Lidlidda Protected Landscape
- Northern Luzon Heroes Hill National Park
