= Natural park =

Natural park may refer to:

- Nature park, a protected landscape (common term in some European countries)
- Protected area, some other types of protected areas in different countries

== By country ==
- Natural park (Philippines)
- Natural park (Spain) (Spanish: parque natural)
