= Calbayog Pan-as–Hayiban Protected Landscape =

Protected area in the Philippines

- Calbayog Watershed
- IUCN category II (national park)
- Location within Philippines
- Location: Samar, Philippines
- Nearest city: Calbayog
- Coordinates: 12°16′5″N 124°30′33″E
- Area: 7,832 hectares (19,350 acres)
- Established: December 15, 1967 (Watershed forest reserve); February 3, 1998 (Protected landscape)
- Governing body: Department of Environment and Natural Resources

The Calbayog Pan-as–Hayiban Protected Landscape, also known as the Calbayog Watershed, is a watershed and protected area located northwest of the city of Calbayog, Province of Samar in Oquendo District between Tinambacan District and San Isidro, Northern Samar in the Philippines. It is a mountainous region in the Tanaoan Ridge within the Mount Zamal Range that divides the three provinces of Samar. The protected area extends along the valley of the Hayiban River, the primary source of water for the Calbayog Water District. It consists of old-growth trees and a network of rivers, waterfalls, and streams capable of generating 2,279 liters of water per day. The area also includes Pan-as Falls and its surrounding landscape, which supplies hydroelectric power to the city. The area was declared a forest reserve in 1967 known as the Pan-as Falls–Hayiban Watershed Forest Reserve with a total area of 7,832 hectares (19,350 acres). In 1998, through Proclamation No. 1158 issued by President Fidel Ramos, the watershed was reclassified as a protected landscape. It is one of four protected areas in the island of Samar.

== Description ==
The Pan-as–Hayiban protected area is one of 39 watersheds in the main island of Samar. It encompasses several barangays in the mountainous northern interior of Oquendo District by Calbayog's border with Northern Samar province. The area is home to all three water sources for the Calbayog City Water District: Pan-as Falls in the barangay of Pilar, and Pasungon Falls and the Himoni River in the neighboring barangay of Cabatuan. Pan-as Falls, situated some 20 kilometres (12 mi) northwest of the Calbayog city proper with an elevation of 274 metres (899 ft) above sea level, is one of the city's popular tourist attractions. It is surrounded by open canopy and residual forests with some areas of cultivation with brushes and grasslands. Ton-oc Falls in the barangay of Barral is also located within the watershed.
