= Bessang Pass Natural Monument =

Protected area and WWII memorial in Ilocos Sur, Philippines

- IUCN category III (natural monument or feature)
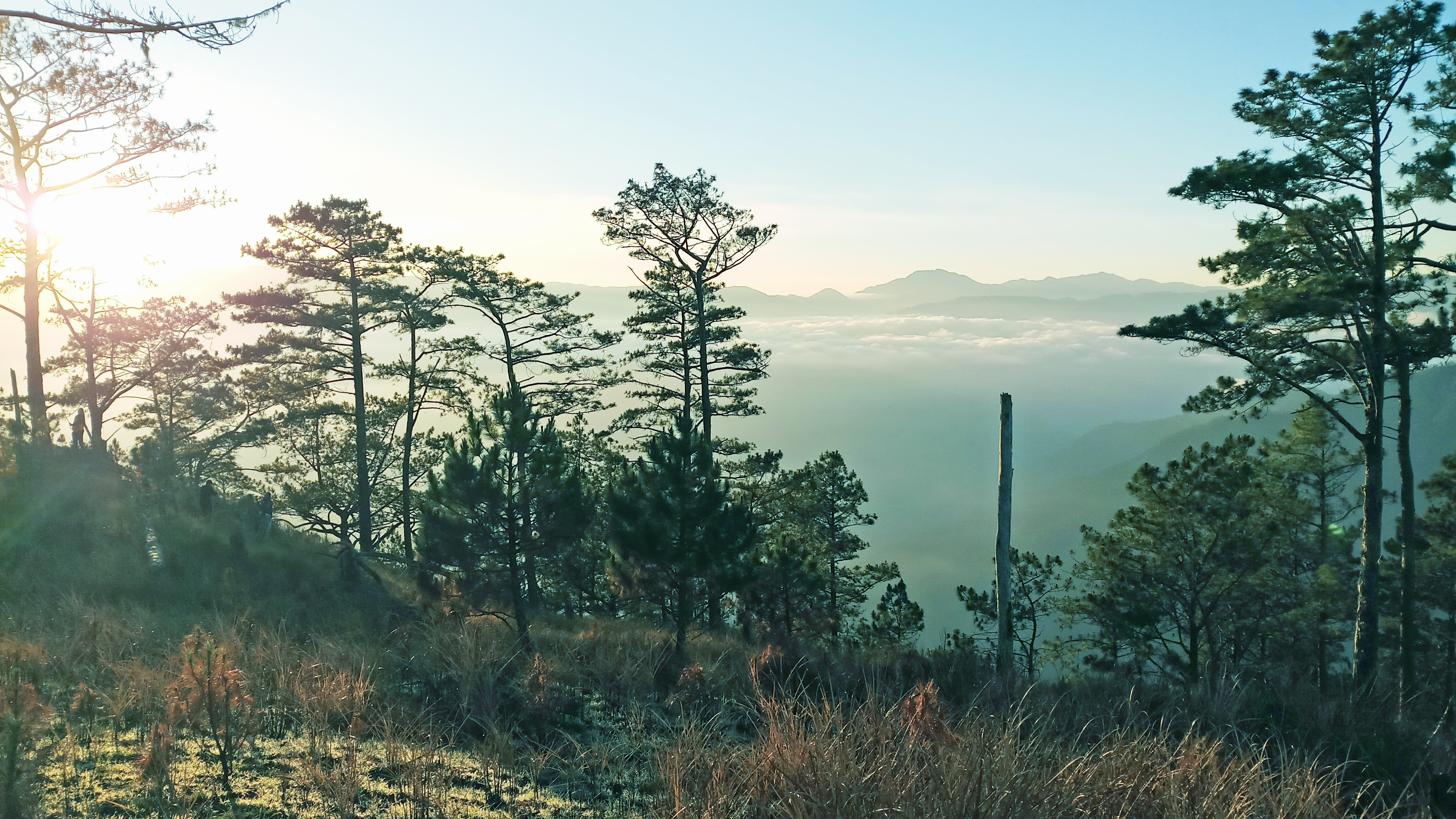
- View from the summit of Mount Namandiraan at the Bessang Pass Natural Monument

- Location within Luzon Location within Philippines
- Location: Ilocos Sur, Philippines
- Nearest city: Candon
- Coordinates: 16°57′37″N 120°39′28″E
- Area: 693.32 hectares (1,713.2 acres)
- Established: August 10, 1954 (National shrine); April 23, 2000 (Natural monument)
- Governing body: Department of Environment and Natural Resources

The Bessang Pass Natural Monument is a protected area and memorial that commemorates the victory on June 14, 1945, by Filipino soldiers serving the U.S. Army Forces in the Philippines Northern Luzon (USAFIP-NL) over the Imperial Japanese Army in the Battle of Bessang Pass which led to Japan's eventual surrender and end to World War II in the Philippines. It covers an area of 693.32 hectares (1,713.2 acres) and a buffer zone of 427.79 hectares (1,057.1 acres) in the municipality of Cervantes in Ilocos Sur. The mountain pass was initially a component of the Tirad Pass National Park, declared in 1938 through Proclamation No. 294 by then President Manuel Luis Quezon.

On August 10, 1954, it was established as the Bessang Pass National Shrine with an area of 304 hectares (750 acres) by virtue of Proclamation No. 55 signed by President Ramon Magsaysay. The national shrine was declared and reclassified as a natural monument under NIPAS in April 2000 through Proclamation No. 284 by President Joseph Estrada.

In 2018, Republic Act 11038 states that all protected areas legislated under the E-NIPAS (which includes this site) shall fall under the classification of National Park as provided for in the Constitution.

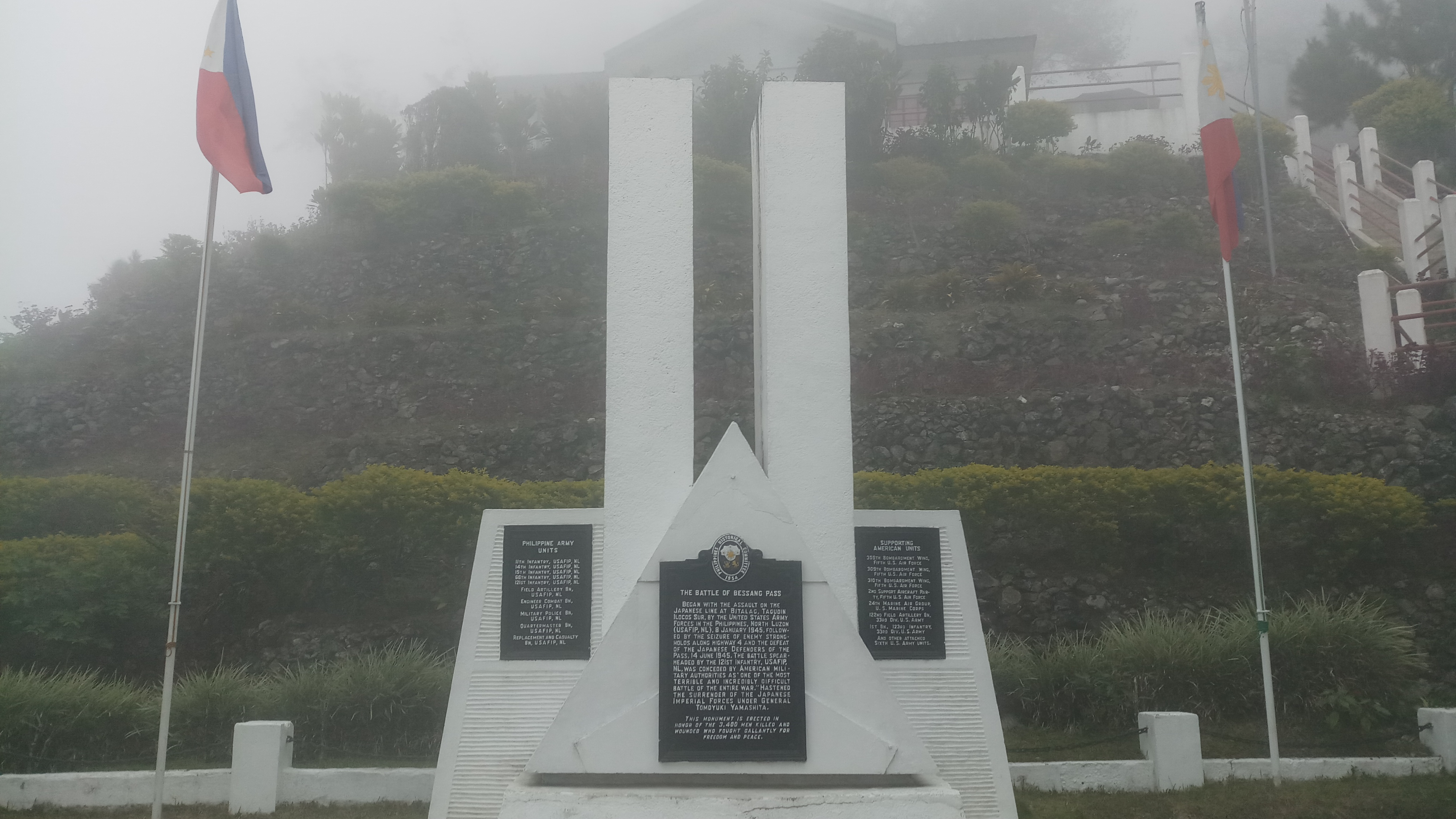
Bessang Pass Monument

== Description ==
Bessang Pass lies along Route 4, which is now known as the Tagudin–Cervantes–Sabangan Road (N205) in the barangay of Malaya. The pass lies on the southeast side of Langiatan Hill, which reaches a height of 4,000 feet (1,200 m). South of the pass, Mount Namogoian rises to 6,830 feet (2,080 m). East of Langiatan Hill is Magun Hill at 4,500 feet (1,400 m).

The park contains pine forests as well as mossy type forests. It is crossed by the Bessang Creek and Matukbo River which provides the water supply for Cervantes and other surrounding communities. The park is also the habitat of 29 bird species, 5 mammals, and reptiles such as the monitor lizard and different species of snakes.

A monument honoring the 1,395 USAFIP-NL members killed during the battle was unveiled in the park in 1954.

== See also ==
- Luzon tropical pine forests
- MacArthur Landing Memorial National Park
- Northern Luzon Heroes Hill National Park
