= Mimbilisan Protected Landscape =

Protected area in Philippines

- IUCN category V (protected landscape/seascape)
- Location within Philippines
- Location: Misamis Oriental, Philippines
- Nearest city: Gingoog
- Coordinates: 8°56′37″N 124°51′29″E
- Area: 66 hectares (160 acres)
- Established: April 11, 1936 (Watershed forest reserve); July 5, 1999 / August 22, 2007 (Protected landscape)
- Governing body: Department of Environment and Natural Resources

The Mimbilisan Protected Landscape is a protected landscape area located in the province of Misamis Oriental in Northern Mindanao in the Philippines. It was established in 1936 to protect the watershed forest surrounding the Mimbilisan Falls (also spelled Milisbilisan Falls) in the municipality of Talisayan declared through Proclamation No. 51 by President Manuel Luis Quezon. It had an initial area of 72 hectares (180 acres) and is an important source for Mimbilisan Water System that supplies water to the surrounding communities in eastern Misamis Oriental. In 1999 and again, in 2007, the forest reserve was reestablished as a protected landscape under the National Integrated Protected Areas System with the enactment of Proclamation No. 134 and Republic Act No. 9494. It is one of five declared protected areas of the Philippines in Misamis Oriental.

== Geography ==
The Mimbilisan Protected Landscape encompasses an area of 66 hectares (160 acres) in the rural villages of Bugdang in Talisayan and Mapua in Balingoan. It lies in the northern foothills of the Mount Balatukan Range, another declared protected area classified as a natural park which forms the backbone of the Misamis Peninsula. Mount Balatukan contains the headwaters of several rivers and streams that drain the surrounding coastal municipalities from Balingasag to Gingoog and empty into the Bohol Sea. The Talisayan River borders the Mimbilisan park to the east and the Mindocdocan River to the west. It is located 6.2 kilometres (3.9 mi) south of the Talisayan municipal proper and some 27 kilometres (17 mi) northwest of Gingoog. It is accessible via the Mapua Road in Balingoan and the Butuan–Cagayan de Oro–Iligan Road from the region's capital and largest city Cagayan de Oro located some 86 kilometres (53 mi) southeast.
