= Little Santa Cruz Island =

Philippine island

- Location within Philippines

Geography
- Location: Basilan Strait
- Coordinates: 6°53′3″N 122°2′33″E
- Adjacent to: Celebes Sea; Sulu Sea

Administration
- Philippines
- Region: Zamboanga Peninsula
- City: Zamboanga City

Additional information

Little Santa Cruz Island is an island situated 3.5 kilometres (2.2 mi) south of downtown Zamboanga City, on the Basilan Strait in the Philippines.

== See also ==
- List of islands of the Philippines
