= List of protected areas of the Philippines =

Protected locations in the Philippines

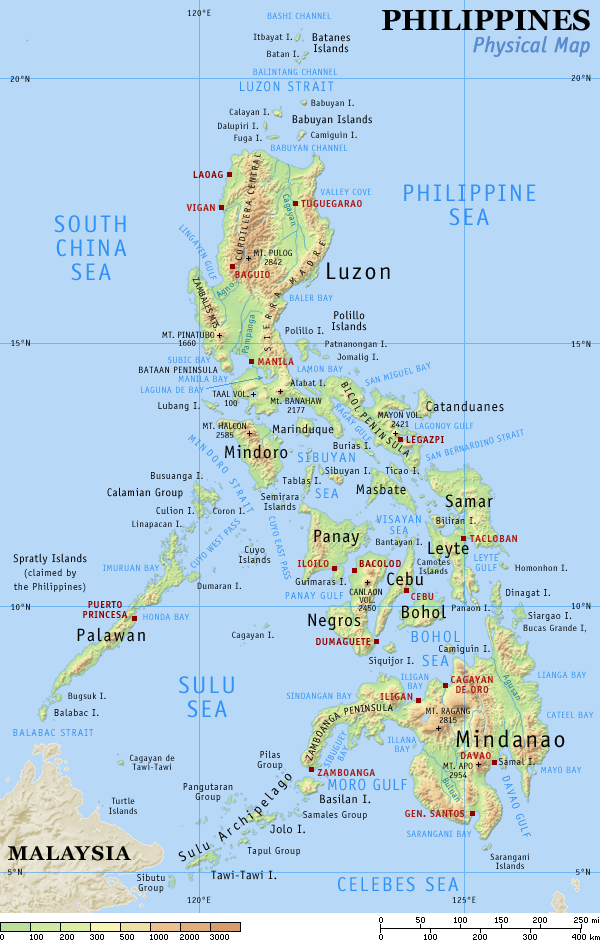
Map of the Philippine archipelago

In the Philippines, protected areas are administered by the Biodiversity Management Bureau of the Department of Environment and Natural Resources (DENR) under the National Integrated Protected Areas System (NIPAS) Act of 1992.

As of 2020, there are 244 protected areas in the Philippines, covering a total area of about 7,760,000 hectares (19,200,000 acres) – 15.4% of the Philippines' total area.

== History ==
The first important legislation that formed the basis of the current system of national parks and protected areas in the Philippines is Act No. 648, enacted in 1903 by the Philippine Commission. This act authorized the civil governor to "reserve for civil public purposes, and from sale or settlement, any part of the public domain not appropriated by law for special public purposes."

A total of eight national reserves had been established on July 26, 1904, pursuant to this law. These are the Lamao Forest Reserve in Bataan, Mariquina Reserve in Rizal, Angat River Reserve in Bulacan, Caliraya Falls Reserve in Laguna, La Carlota Reserve in Negros Occidental, San Ramon Reserve in Zamboanga, Magalang Reserve in Pampanga, and Hacienda San Antonio in Isabela. In the same year, the Forest Act of 1904 (Act No. 1148) was adopted that expanded the scope of protected areas in the Philippines. Among the first of such mountain forest reserves to be declared was Mount Maquiling declared on November 21, 1910.

On February 1, 1932, the National Parks Act (Act No. 3195) was enacted that formally established the national parks system in the country. Mount Arayat became the first national park in the Philippines established on June 27, 1933, following this act.

A series of acts and legislations were passed in the next decades that aimed to further strengthen these policies, including the Revised Forestry Code of 1975 (Presidential Decree No. 705) and Forest Administrative Order No. 7. Following the 1987 Constitution, the National Integrated Protected Areas System Act was enacted which further enhanced the administration and classification of protected areas and broadened the mandate of the Department of Environment and Natural Resources in enforcing its provisions.

== Classification ==
Protected areas in the Philippines encompasses 4,620,000 hectares (11,400,000 acres) of terrestrial areas and 3,140,000 hectares (7,800,000 acres) of marine areas. They are managed according to the following classifications described in Section 4 of the National Integrated Protected Areas System Act of 1992 (NIPAS Act).

=== Natural monuments ===
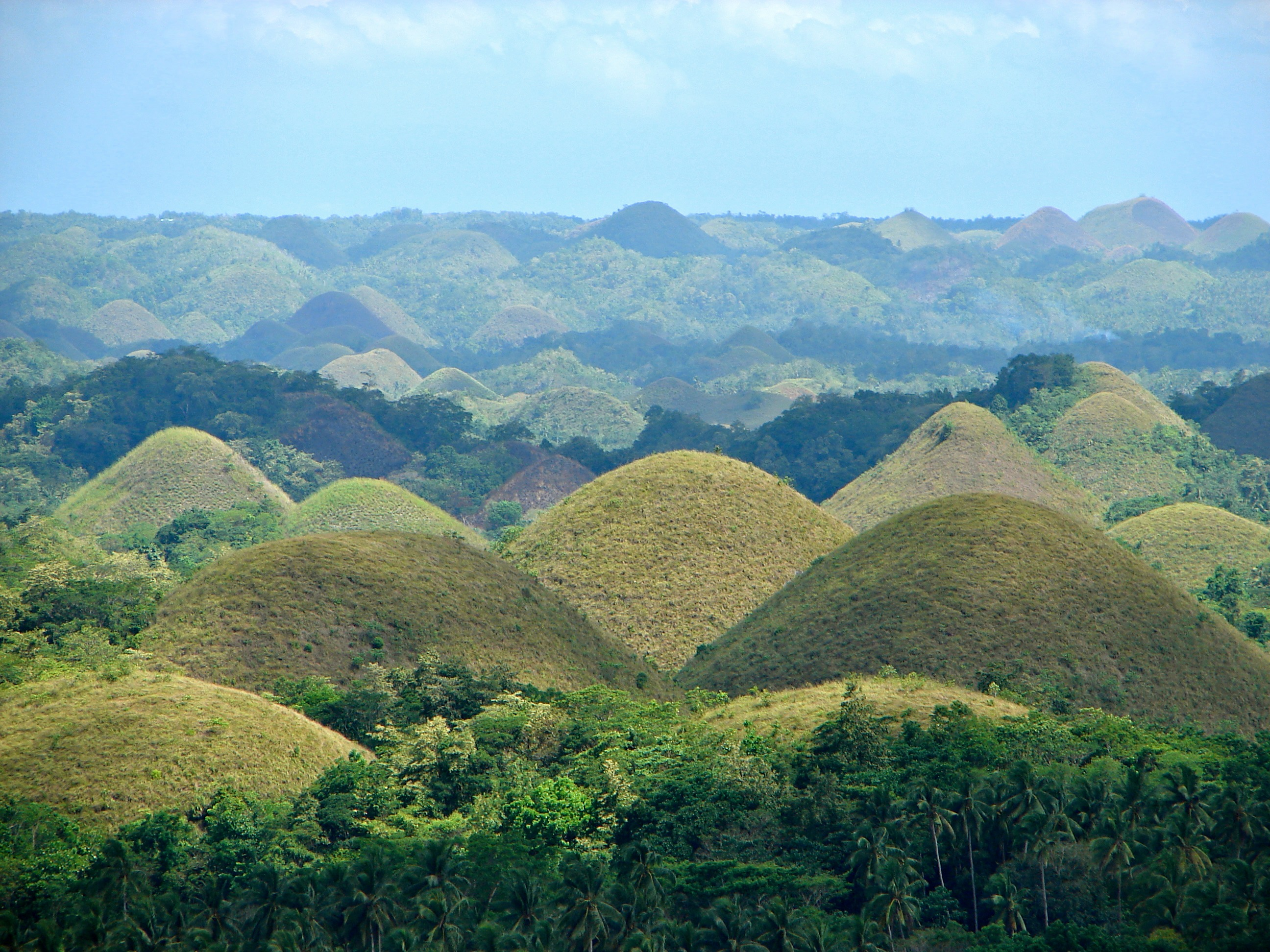
Chocolate Hills Natural Monument

Name	Area	Established	Location
Bessang Pass	693.32 ha (1,713.2 acres)	2000	Ilocos Sur
Chocolate Hills	14,145.00 ha (34,953.1 acres)	1997	Bohol
Salinas	6,675.56 ha (16,495.7 acres)	2000	Nueva Vizcaya
Timpoong and Hibok-Hibok	2,227.62 ha (5,504.6 acres)	2004	Camiguin

=== Protected landscape and seascapes ===
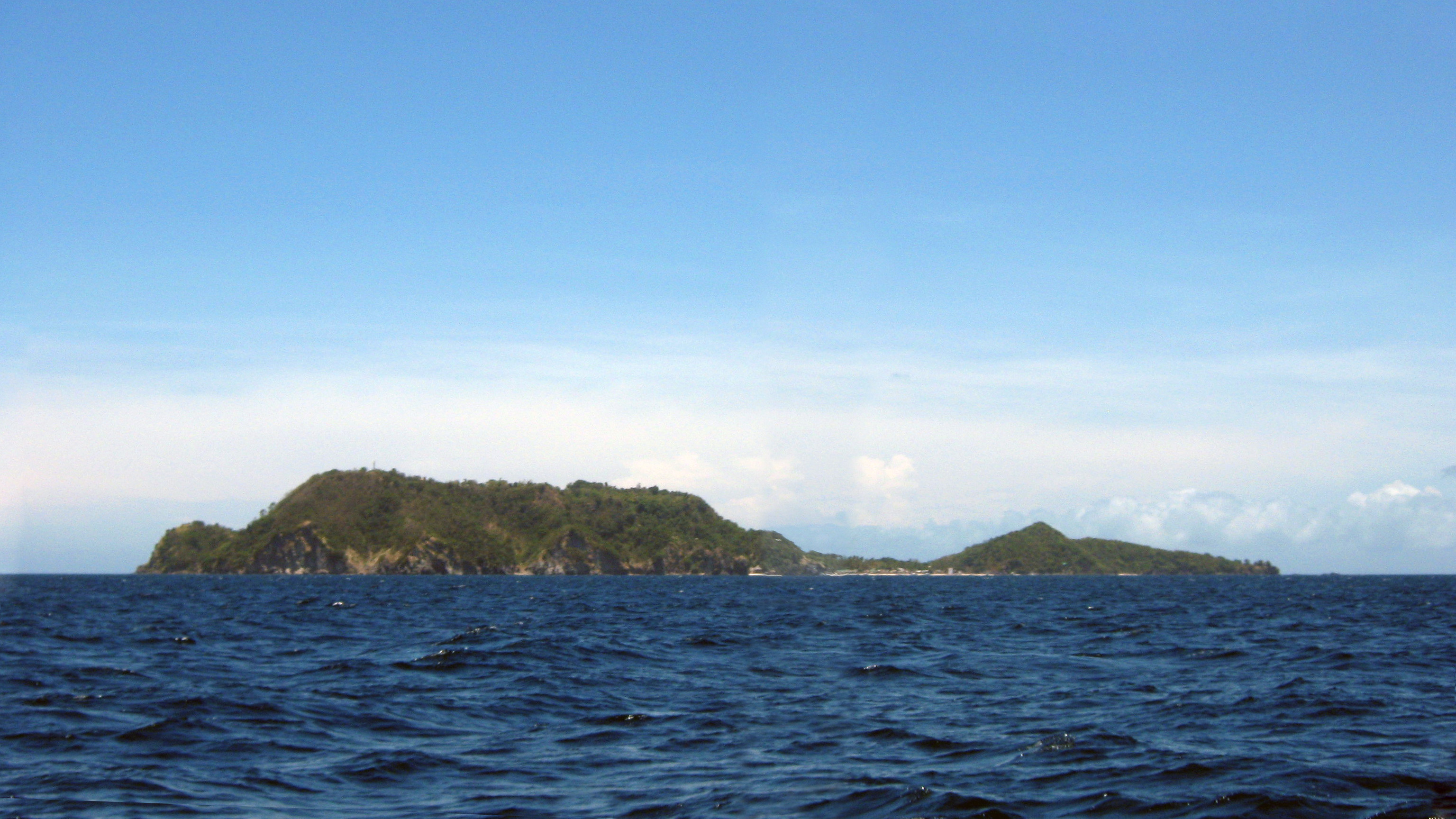
Apo Island Protected Landscape and Seascape

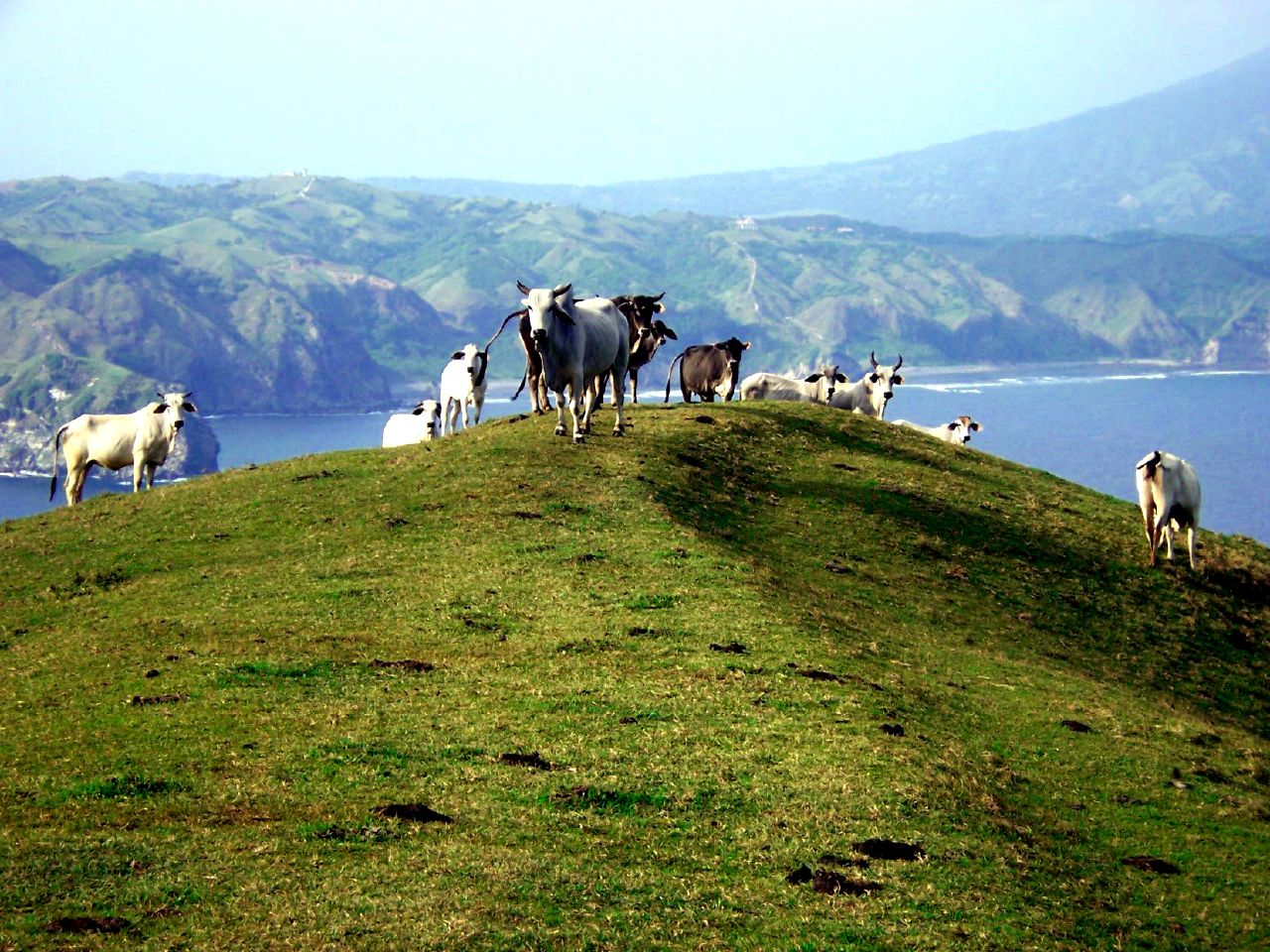
Batanes Protected Landscape and Seascape

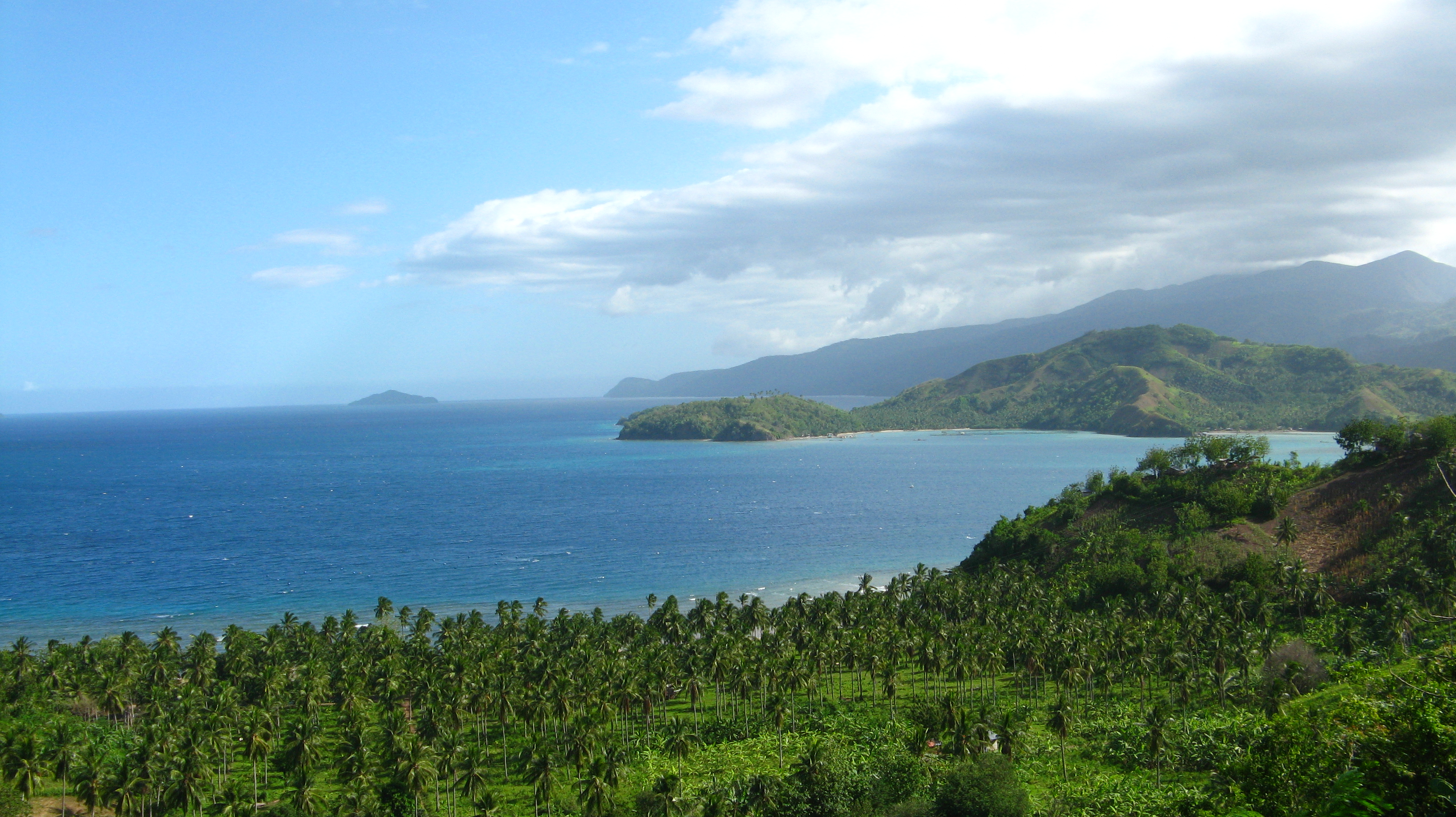
Pujada Bay Protected Landscape and Seascape

Name	Area	Established	Location
Agoo–Damortis	10,513.30 ha (25,978.9 acres)	2000	La Union
Alburquerque–Loay–Loboc	1,164.16 ha (2,876.7 acres)	1999	Bohol
Alibijaban	1,056 ha (2,610 acres)	2025	Quezon
Aliguay Island	1,191.89 ha (2,945.2 acres)	1999	Zamboanga del Norte
Apo Island	691.45 ha (1,708.6 acres)	1994	Negros Oriental
Baliangao	295.00 ha (729.0 acres)	2000	Misamis Occidental
Batanes	213,578.00 ha (527,762.7 acres)	1994	Batanes
Biri Larosa	33,492.00 ha (82,760.5 acres)	2000	Northern Samar
Cuatro Islas	12,500.00 ha (30,888.2 acres)	2000	Leyte
Dumanquilas Bay	25,948.00 ha (64,118.9 acres)	1999	Zamboanga del Sur
Great and Little Santa Cruz Islands	1,877.00 ha (4,638.2 acres)	2000	Zamboanga del Sur
Guiuan	60,448.00 ha (149,370.3 acres)	1994	Eastern Samar
Initao–Libertad	1,300.78 ha (3,214.3 acres)	2002	Misamis Oriental
Mabini	6,106.00 ha (15,088.3 acres)	2000	Davao de Oro
Malabungot	120.62 ha (298.1 acres)	2000	Camarines Sur
Malampaya Sound	200,115.00 ha (494,494.9 acres)	2000	Palawan
Murcielagos Island	151.00 ha (373.1 acres)	2000	Zamboanga del Norte
Peñablanca	118,781.58 ha (293,515.7 acres)	2003	Cagayan
Pujada Bay	21,200.00 ha (52,386.3 acres)	1994	Davao Oriental
Selinog Island	1,294.35 ha (3,198.4 acres)	2000	Zamboanga del Norte
Siargao Island	278,914.13 ha (689,211.8 acres)	1996	Surigao del Norte
Talibon Islands	6,456.87 ha (15,955.3 acres)	1999	Bohol

==== Protected landscapes ====
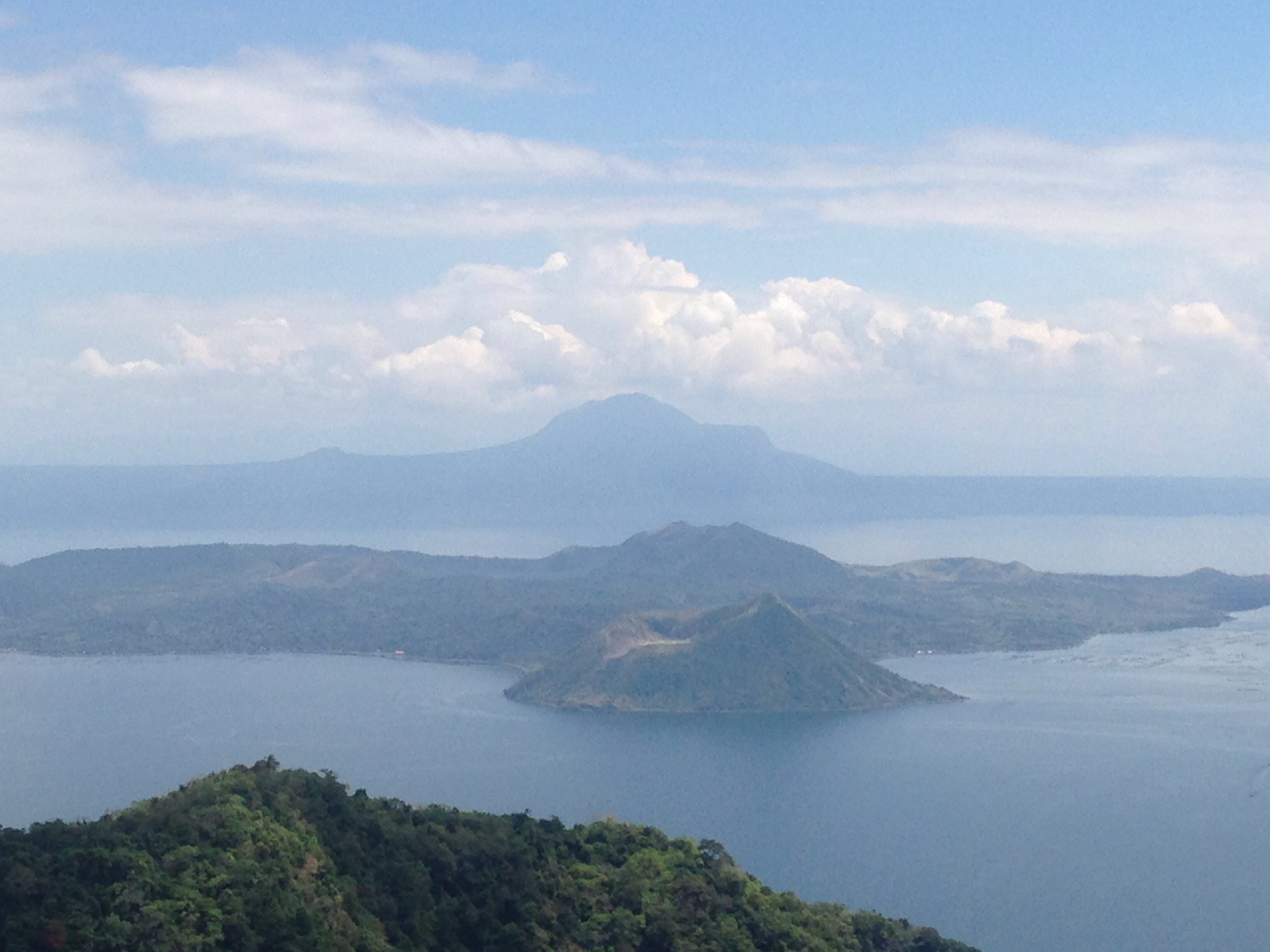
Taal Volcano Protected Landscape

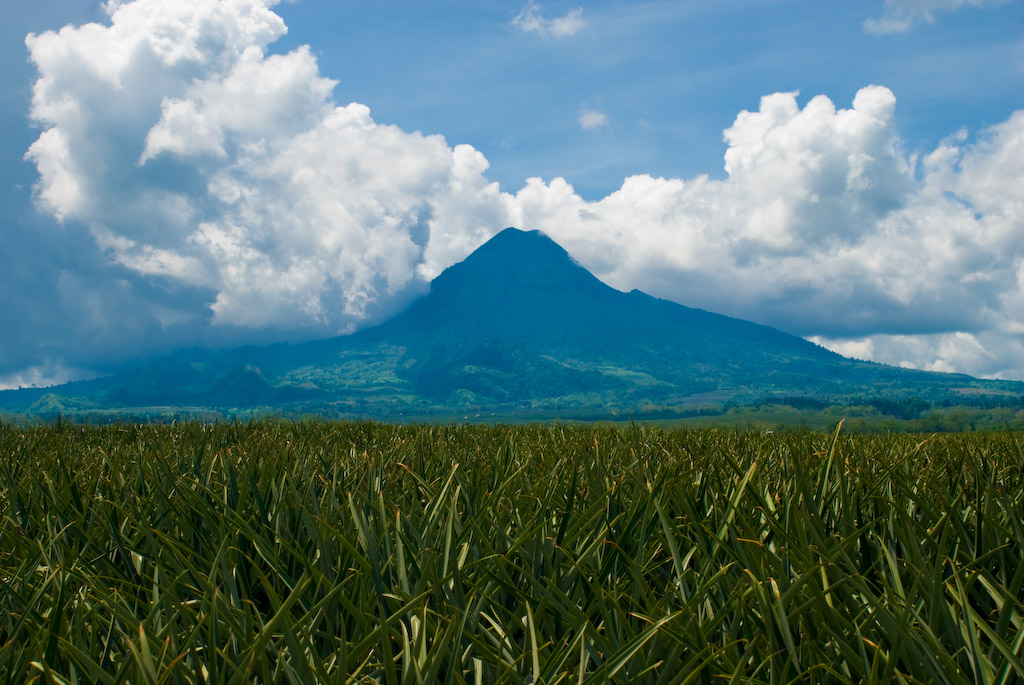
Mount Matutum Protected Landscape

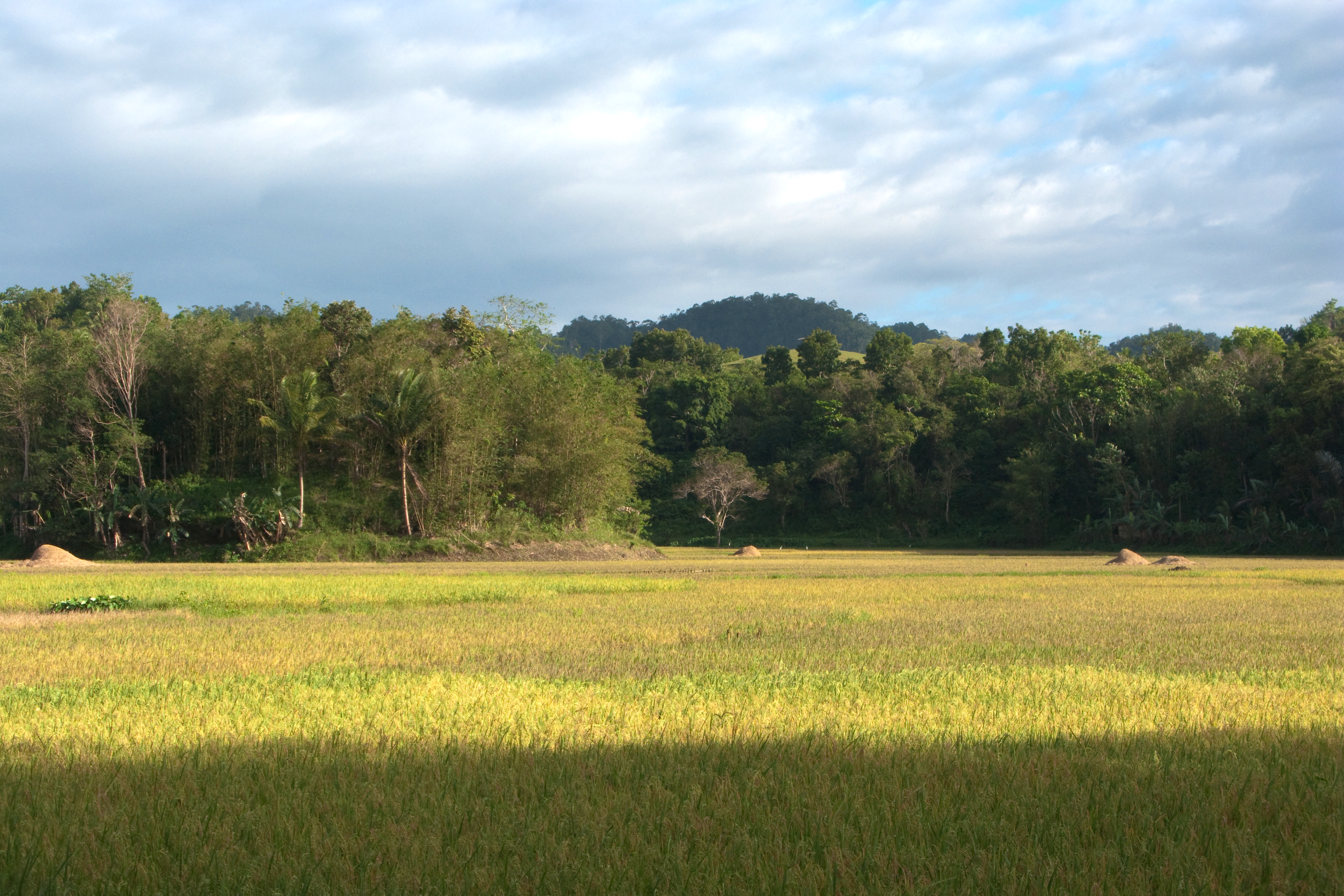
Rajah Sikatuna Protected Landscape

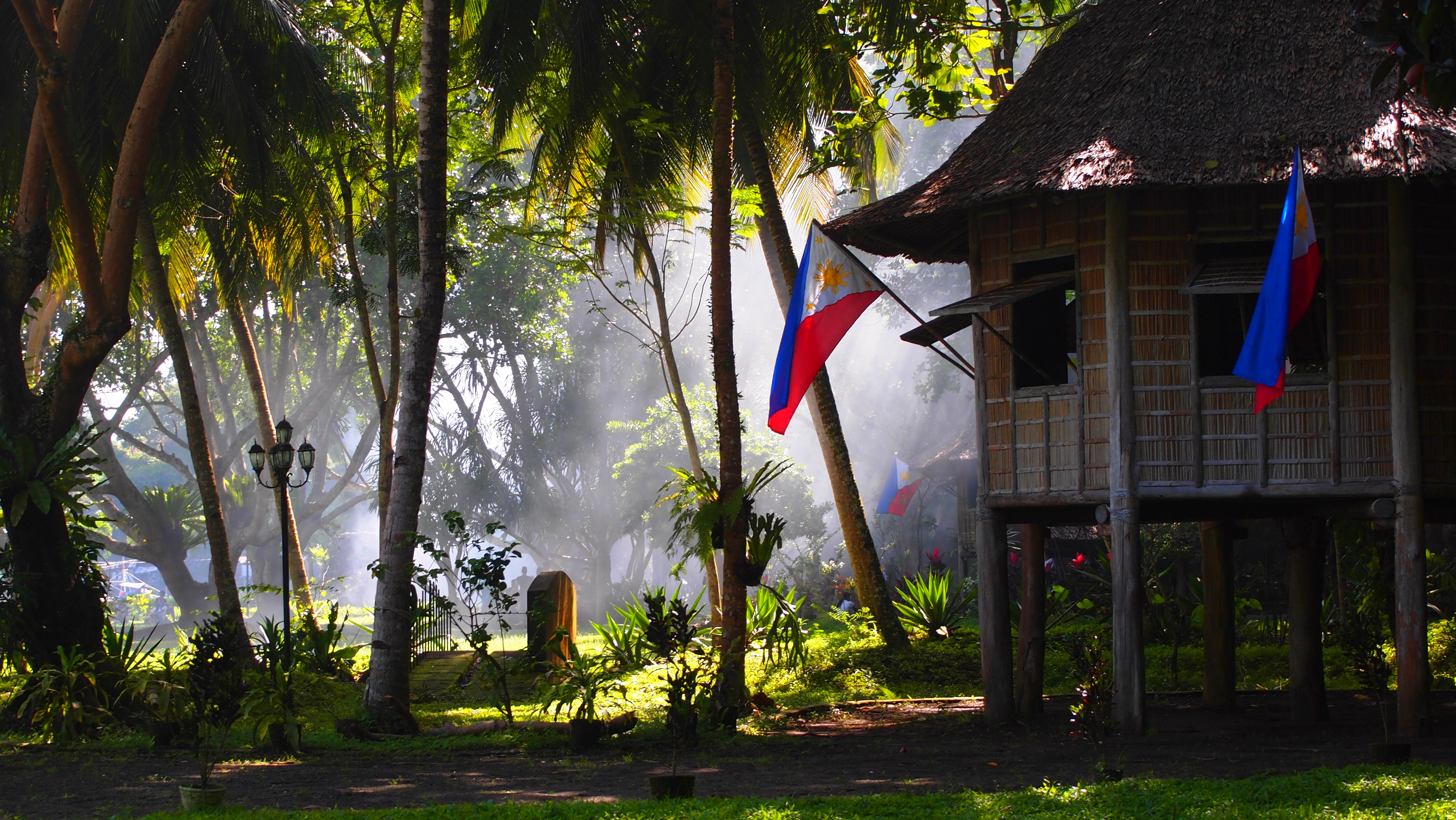
José Rizal Memorial Protected Landscape

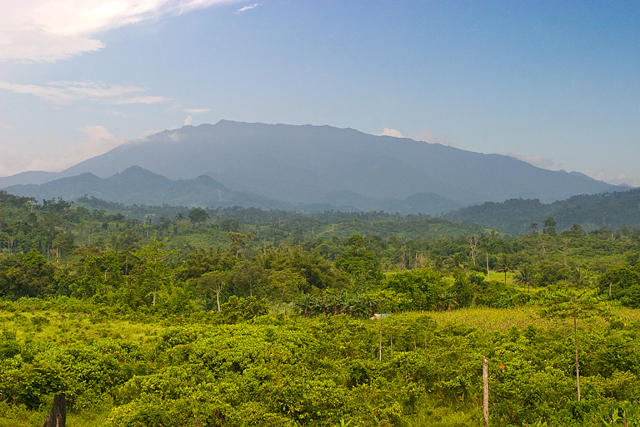
Mount Mantalingajan Protected Landscape

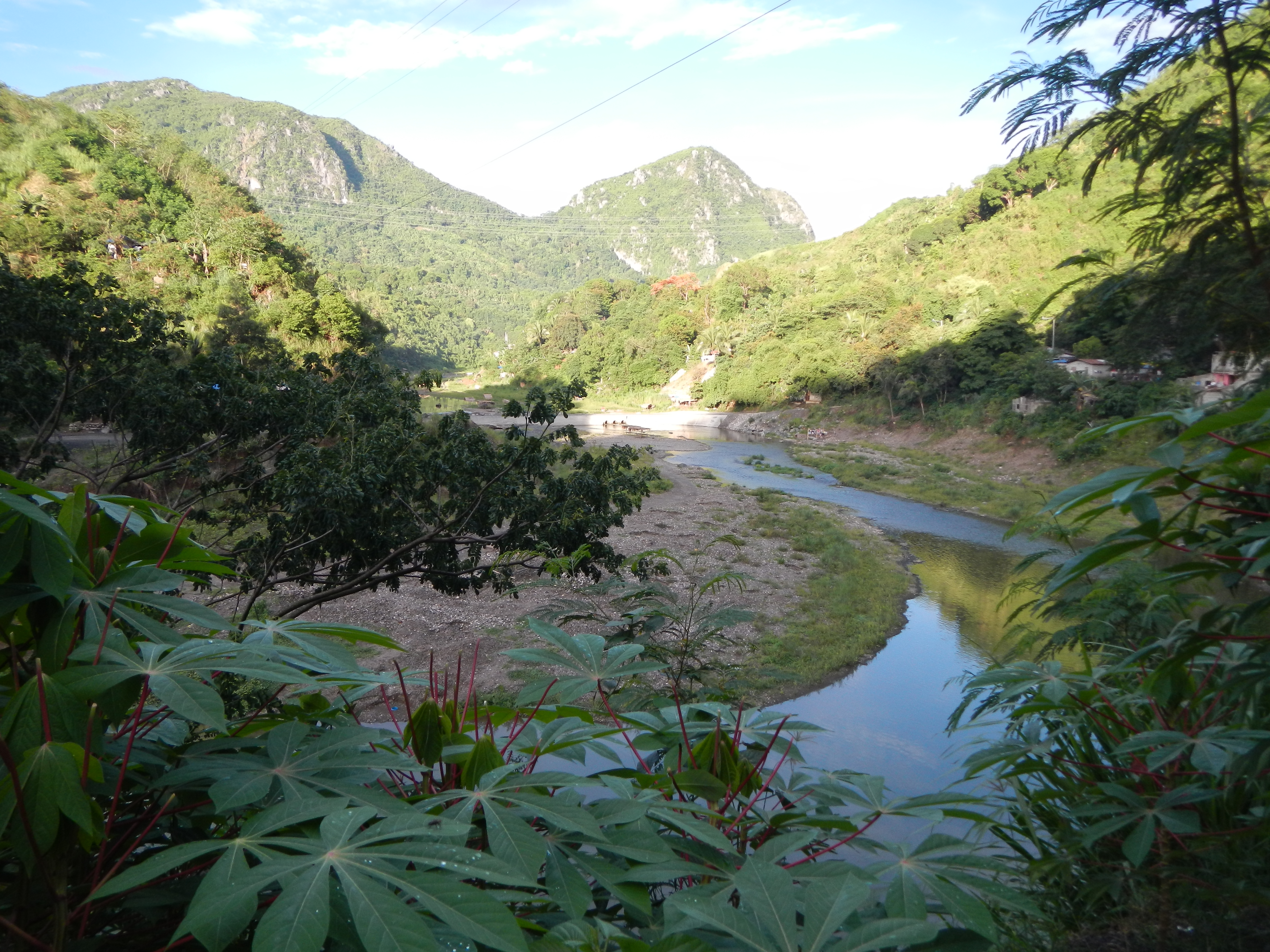
Upper Marikina River Basin Protected Landscape

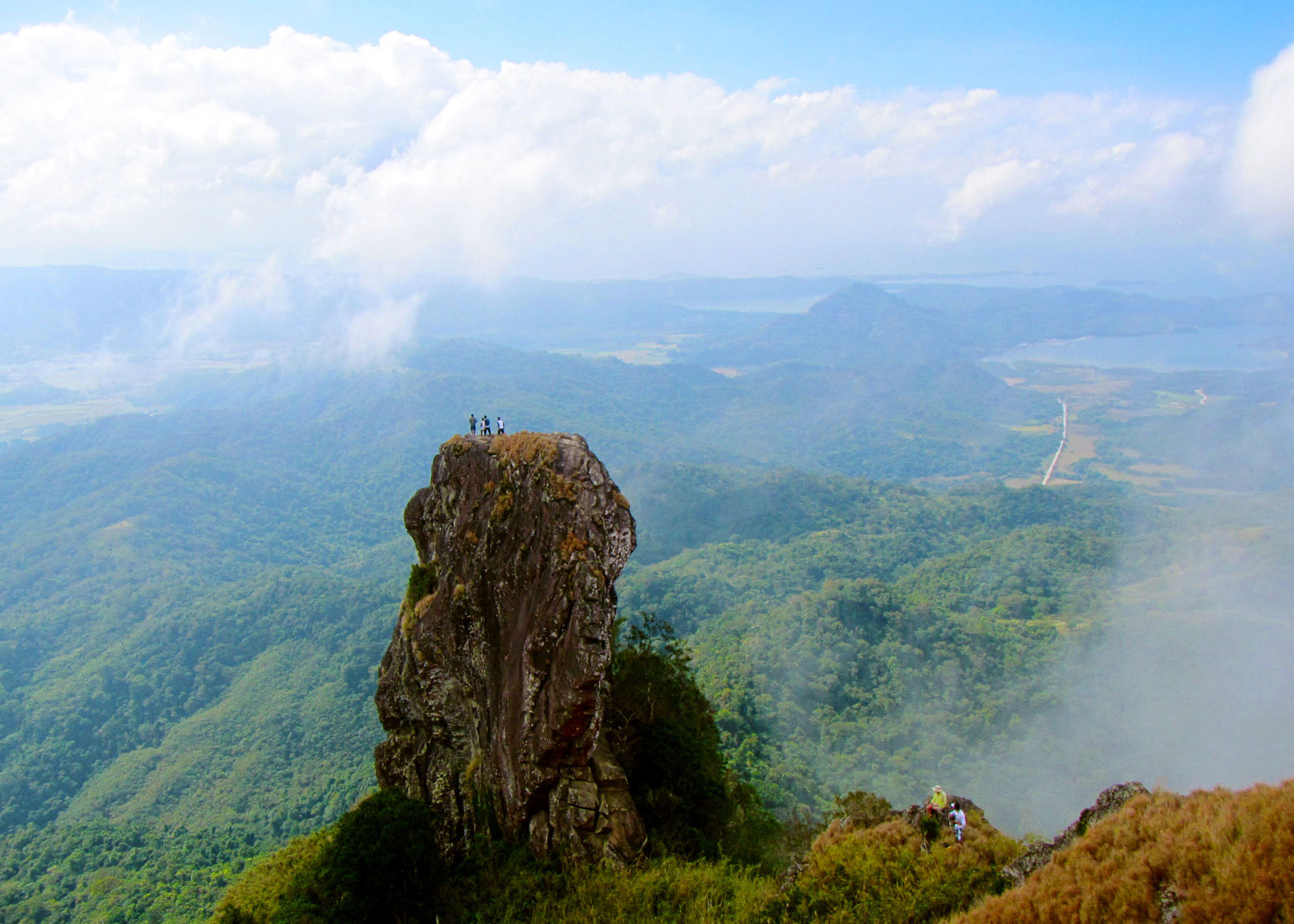
Mounts Palay-Palay–Mataas-na-Gulod Protected Landscape

Name	Area	Established	Location
Aliwagwag	10,491.33 ha (25,924.6 acres)	2011	Davao de Oro; Davao Oriental
Amro River	6,471.08 ha (15,990.4 acres)	2000	Aurora
Baganga	114.88 ha (283.9 acres)	2000	Davao Oriental
Banao	21,567.53 ha (53,294.5 acres)	2022	Kalinga
Bigbiga	135.71 ha (335.3 acres)	2000	Ilocos Sur
Buenavista	284.27 ha (702.4 acres)	2000	Quezon
Calbayog Pan-as–Hayiban	7,832.00 ha (19,353.3 acres)	1998	Samar
Casecnan	88,846.80 ha (219,545.2 acres)	2000	Cagayan Valley; Aurora
Central Cebu	29,062.00 ha (71,813.8 acres)	2003	Cebu
Dinadiawan River	3,371.33 ha (8,330.7 acres)	2000	Aurora
Hinulugang Taktak	3.20 ha (7.9 acres)	2000	Rizal
José Rizal Memorial	439.00 ha (1,084.8 acres)	2000	Zamboanga del Norte
Libunao	46.70 ha (115.4 acres)	2000	Ilocos Sur
Lidlidda	1,157.44 ha (2,860.1 acres)	2000	Ilocos Sur
Magapit	3,403.62 ha (8,410.5 acres)	2000	Cagayan
Mainit Hot Springs	1,374.00 ha (3,395.2 acres)	2000	Davao de Oro
Manleluag Spring	1,935.17 ha (4,781.9 acres)	2004	Pangasinan
Mati	914.26 ha (2,259.2 acres)	2005	Davao Oriental
Maulawin Spring	149.01 ha (368.2 acres)	2000	Quezon
Mimbilisan	66.00 ha (163.1 acres)	1999	Misamis Oriental
Mount Arayat	3,711.34 ha (9,170.9 acres)	2022	Pampanga
Mounts Banahaw–San Cristobal	10,900.59 ha (26,935.9 acres)	2009	Quezon; Laguna
Mount Masaraga	840.00 ha (2,075.7 acres)	2025	Albay
Mount Mantalingajan	120,457.00 ha (297,655.7 acres)	2009	Palawan
Mount Matutum	15,600.00 ha (38,548.4 acres)	1995	South Cotabato
Mounts Palay-Palay–Mataas-na-Gulod	3,973.13 ha (9,817.8 acres)	2007	Cavite; Batangas
Mount Pulag	11,602 ha (28,670 acres)	2022	Benguet; Ifugao; Nueva Vizcaya
Mount Timolan	1,994.80 ha (4,929.3 acres)	2000	Zamboanga del Sur
Naga-Kabasalan	5,505.45 ha (13,604.3 acres)	2022	Zamboanga Sibugay
Pamitinan	600.00 ha (1,482.6 acres)	1996	Rizal
Quezon	938.00 ha (2,317.8 acres)	2003	Quezon
Quirino	164,364.46 ha (406,153.4 acres)	2005	Quirino
Rajah Sikatuna	10,452.60 ha (25,828.9 acres)	2000	Bohol
Roosevelt	786.04 ha (1,942.3 acres)	2000	Bataan
Santa Lucia	174.16 ha (430.4 acres)	2000	Ilocos Sur
Simbahan–Talagas	2,266.49 ha (5,600.6 acres)	2000	Aurora
Taal Volcano	62,292.14 ha (153,927.2 acres)	1996	Batangas
Talaytay	3,526.29 ha (8,713.7 acres)	2000	Aurora
Tirad Pass	7,507.60 ha (18,551.7 acres)	2022	Ilocos Sur
Upper Marikina River Basin	26,125.64 ha (64,557.9 acres)	2011	Rizal

==== Protected seascapes ====
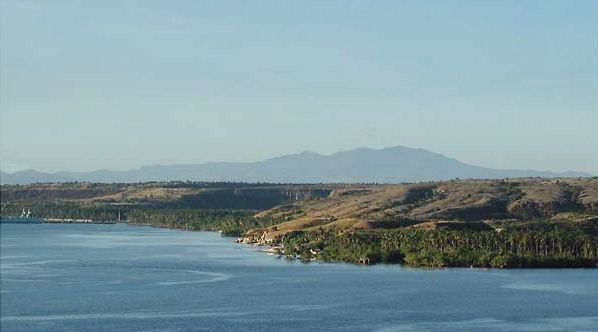
Sarangani Bay Protected Seascape

Name	Area	Established	Location
Panglao Island	385.67 ha (953.0 acres)	2003	Bohol
Sarangani Bay	215,950.00 ha (533,624.1 acres)	1996	Sarangani
Tañon Strait	450.00 ha (1,112.0 acres)	1998	Cebu; Negros Occidental; Negros Oriental

=== Game refuge and bird sanctuaries ===
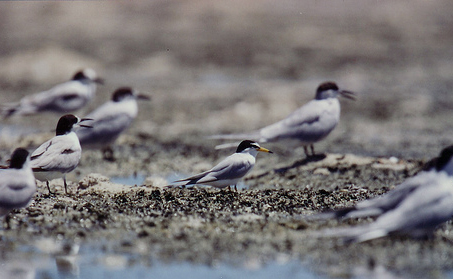
Olango Island Bird Sanctuary

Name	Area	Established	Location
Calauit Safari Park	3,400.00 ha (8,401.6 acres)	1976	Palawan
Calavite and FB Harrison	121,983.81 ha (301,428.6 acres)	1920	Occidental Mindoro
Lake Buluan	6,300.00 ha (15,567.6 acres)	2006	Cotabato
Lake Malimanga	12.35 ha (30.5 acres)	1980	Zambales
Olango Island	920.00 ha (2,273.4 acres)	1992	Cebu
Palawan	761,416.00 ha (1,881,499.9 acres)	1967	Palawan

=== Resource reserves ===
Name	Area	Established	Location
Siocon	793.74 ha (1,961.4 acres)	1999	Zamboanga del Norte
Upper Agno River Basin	77,561.00 ha (191,657.4 acres)	2000	Cordillera; Nueva Vizcaya

=== Managed resource protected areas ===
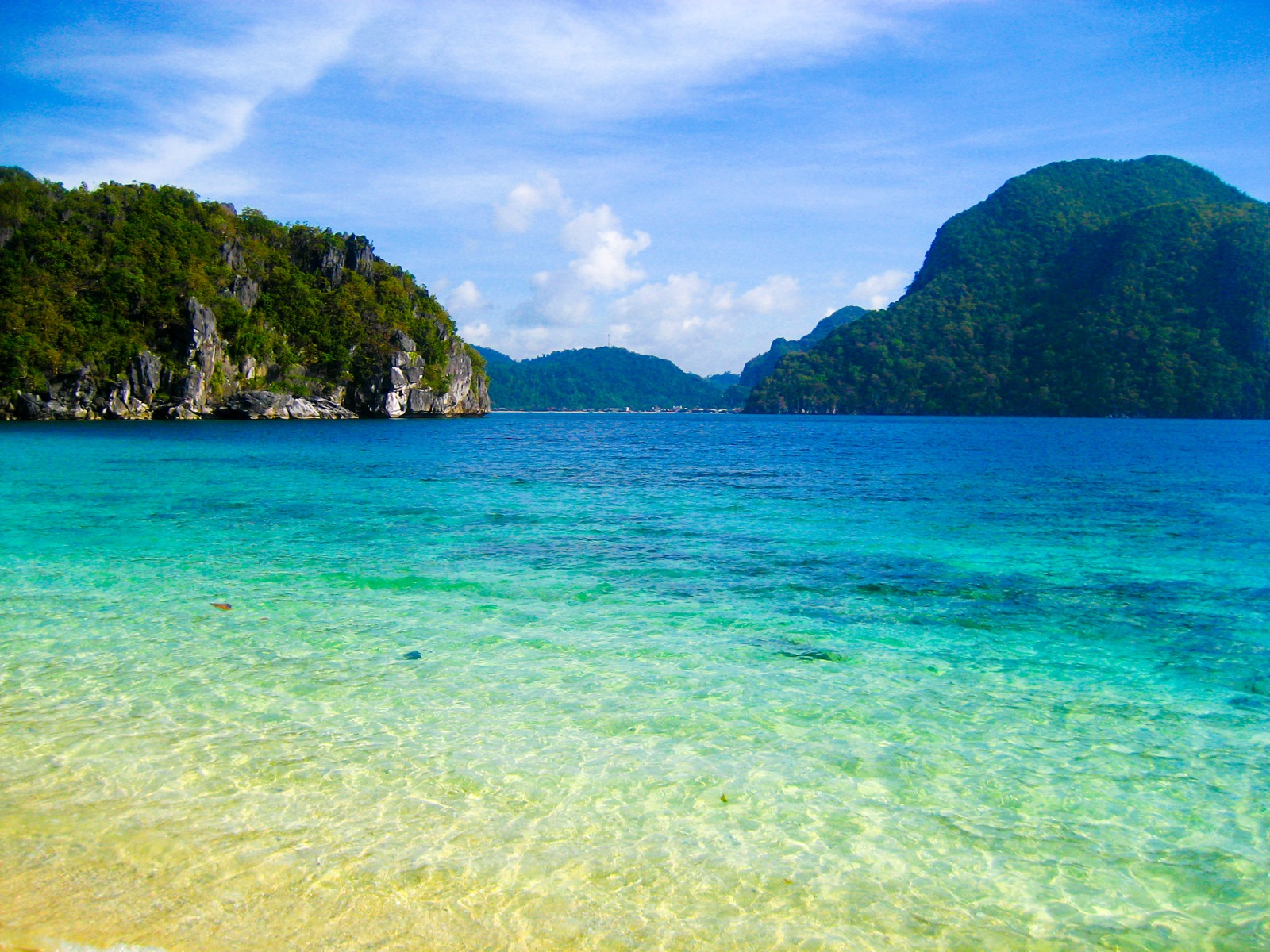
El Nido Managed Resource Protected Area

Name	Area	Established	Location
El Nido Managed Resource Protected Area	89,134.76 ha (220,256.8 acres)	1998	Palawan

=== Marine reserves ===
Name	Area	Established	Location
Masinloc and Oyon Bay	7,568.00 ha (18,700.9 acres)	1993	Zambales
Palaui Island	7,415.48 ha (18,324.1 acres)	1994	Cagayan
Sagay	32,000.00 ha (79,073.7 acres)	2001	Negros Occidental
Taklong Island	1,143.45 ha (2,825.5 acres)	1990	Guimaras

=== Watershed forest reserves ===
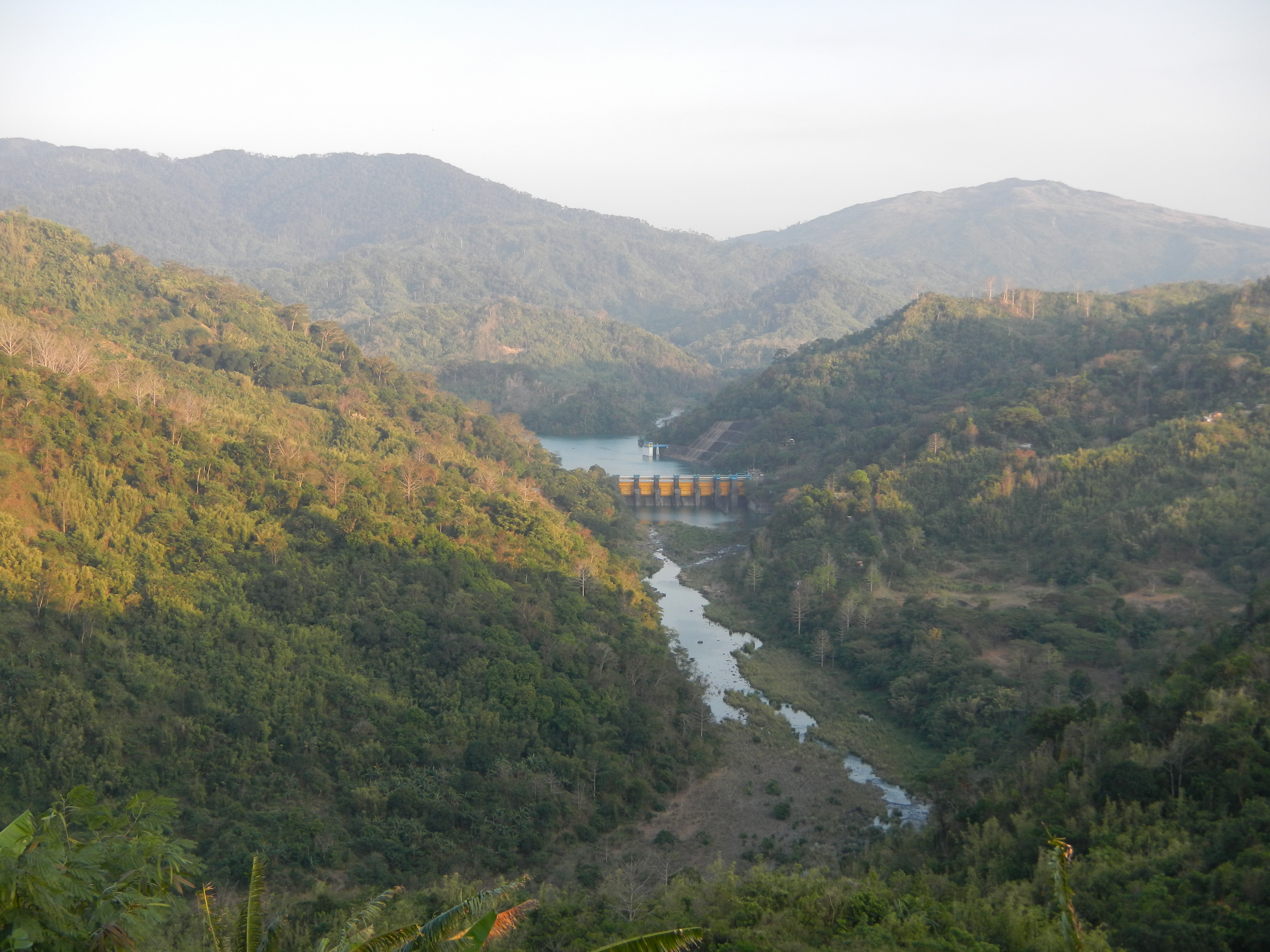
Angat Watershed Forest Reserve

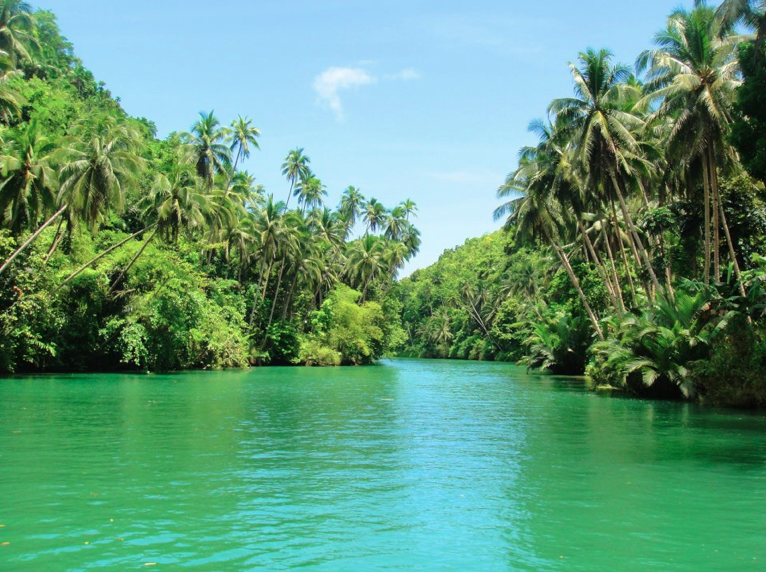
Loboc Watershed Forest Reserve

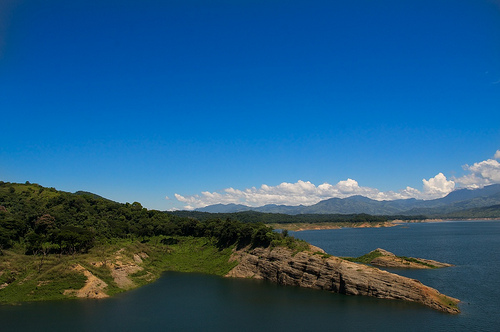
Pantabangan–Carranglan Watershed Forest Reserve

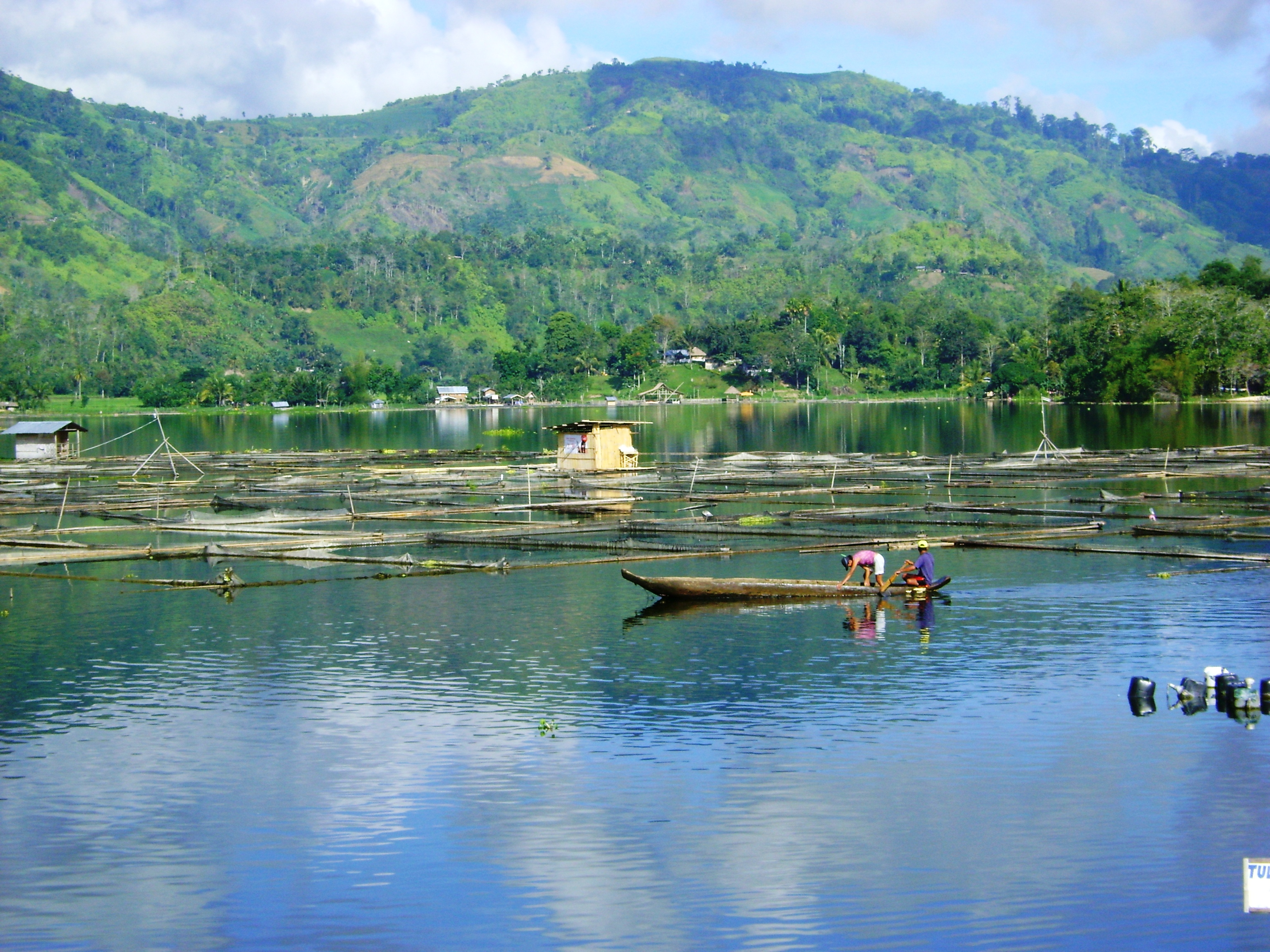
Allah Valley Watershed Forest Reserve

Name	Area	Established	Location
Aklan River	23,185.00 ha (57,291.4 acres)	1990	Aklan
Alabat	688.00 ha (1,700.1 acres)	1987	Quezon
Alijawan–Cansuhay–Anibongan River	3,630.00 ha (8,969.9 acres)	1992	Bohol
Allah Valley	92,450.00 ha (228,448.9 acres)	1985	South Cotabato
Angat Watershed	6,600.00 ha (16,309.0 acres)	1968	Bulacan
Aurora	430.00 ha (1,062.6 acres)	1936	Aurora
Bawa	8,955.00 ha (22,128.3 acres)	1987	Cagayan
Binahaan River	465.00 ha (1,149.0 acres)	1991	Quezon
Calabgan	4,803.00 ha (11,868.5 acres)	1992	Aurora
Calatrava–San Andres–San Agustin	2,670.00 ha (6,597.7 acres)	1982	Romblon
Calauag	328.00 ha (810.5 acres)	1939	Quezon
Capalonga	752.00 ha (1,858.2 acres)	1966	Camarines Norte
Catanduanes	26,010.00 ha (64,272.1 acres)	1987	Catanduanes
Dahican	44.00 ha (108.7 acres)	1933	Camarines Norte
Dalanas River	8,558.00 ha (21,147.3 acres)	1990	Antique
Dibalo–Pingit–Zabali–Malayat	4,528.00 ha (11,188.9 acres)	1992	Aurora
Dipaculao	1,786.00 ha (4,413.3 acres)	1987	Aurora
Doña Remedios–General Tinio	20,760.00 ha (51,299.1 acres)	1988	Bulacan; Nueva Ecija
Dupax	424.80 ha (1,049.7 acres)	1934	Nueva Vizcaya
Ilocos Norte Metro	2,815.00 ha (6,956.0 acres)	1934	Ilocos Norte
Ilog-Hilabangan	10,211.00 ha (25,231.9 acres)	1990	Negros Occidental
Infanta	384.00 ha (948.9 acres)	1967	Quezon
Jalaur River	9,228.00 ha (22,802.9 acres)	1990	Iloilo
Kabankalan	432.00 ha (1,067.5 acres)	1991	Negros Occidental
Lake Lanao	180,460.00 ha (445,926.4 acres)	1992	Lanao del Sur
Libungan	52,820.00 ha (130,521.1 acres)	1990	Cotabato
Loboc River	19,410.00 ha (47,963.2 acres)	1953	Bohol
Lopez	418.00 ha (1,032.9 acres)	1940	Quezon
Lower Agno	39,304.00 ha (97,122.3 acres)	1983	Benguet
Maasin	6,150.00 ha (15,197.0 acres)	1923	Iloilo
Mahugunao	136.00 ha (336.1 acres)	1932	Misamis Oriental
Malagos	235.00 ha (580.7 acres)	1933	Davao del Sur
Marcos Highway	6,105.00 ha (15,085.8 acres)	1978	Benguet
Mariveles (Palanas)	325.00 ha (803.1 acres)	1919	Bataan
Mulanay	26.00 ha (64.2 acres)	1938	Quezon
Naguilian	90.00 ha (222.4 acres)	1936	La Union
Olongapo (Palanas)	6,335.00 ha (15,654.1 acres)	1987	Zambales
Palawan	4,776.00 ha (11,801.8 acres)	1982	Palawan
Palompon	2,392.00 ha (5,910.8 acres)	1988	Leyte
Panay River	4,350.00 ha (10,749.1 acres)	1990	Capiz
Pantabangan–Carranglan Watershed	84,500.00 ha (208,804.0 acres)	1969	Nueva Ecija
Polillo	130.00 ha (321.2 acres)	1966	Quezon
Santa	25.00 ha (61.8 acres)	1935	Ilocos Sur
South Upi	1,894.20 ha (4,680.7 acres)	1987	Maguindanao del Sur
Talavera	37,156.00 ha (91,814.5 acres)	1938	Nueva Ecija; Nueva Vizcaya
Tanap	41.00 ha (101.3 acres)	1971	Ilocos Norte
Tibiang–Damagandong	280.00 ha (691.9 acres)	1938	Quezon
Torrijos	105.00 ha (259.5 acres)	1932	Marinduque
Tumauini	17,670.00 ha (43,663.5 acres)	1994	Isabela
Wangag	6,992.00 ha (17,277.6 acres)	1987	Cagayan

=== Natural biotic areas ===
Name	Area	Established	Location
Abasig–Matogdon–Mananap	5,420.12 ha (13,393.4 acres)	2000	Camarines Norte
Basilan	4,497.00 ha (11,112.3 acres)	2000	Basilan
Buug	1,095.00 ha (2,705.8 acres)	1998	Zamboanga del Sur
Lagonoy	444.60 ha (1,098.6 acres)	2000	Camarines Sur
Tugbo	224 ha (550 acres)	2022	Masbate

=== Wildlife sanctuaries ===
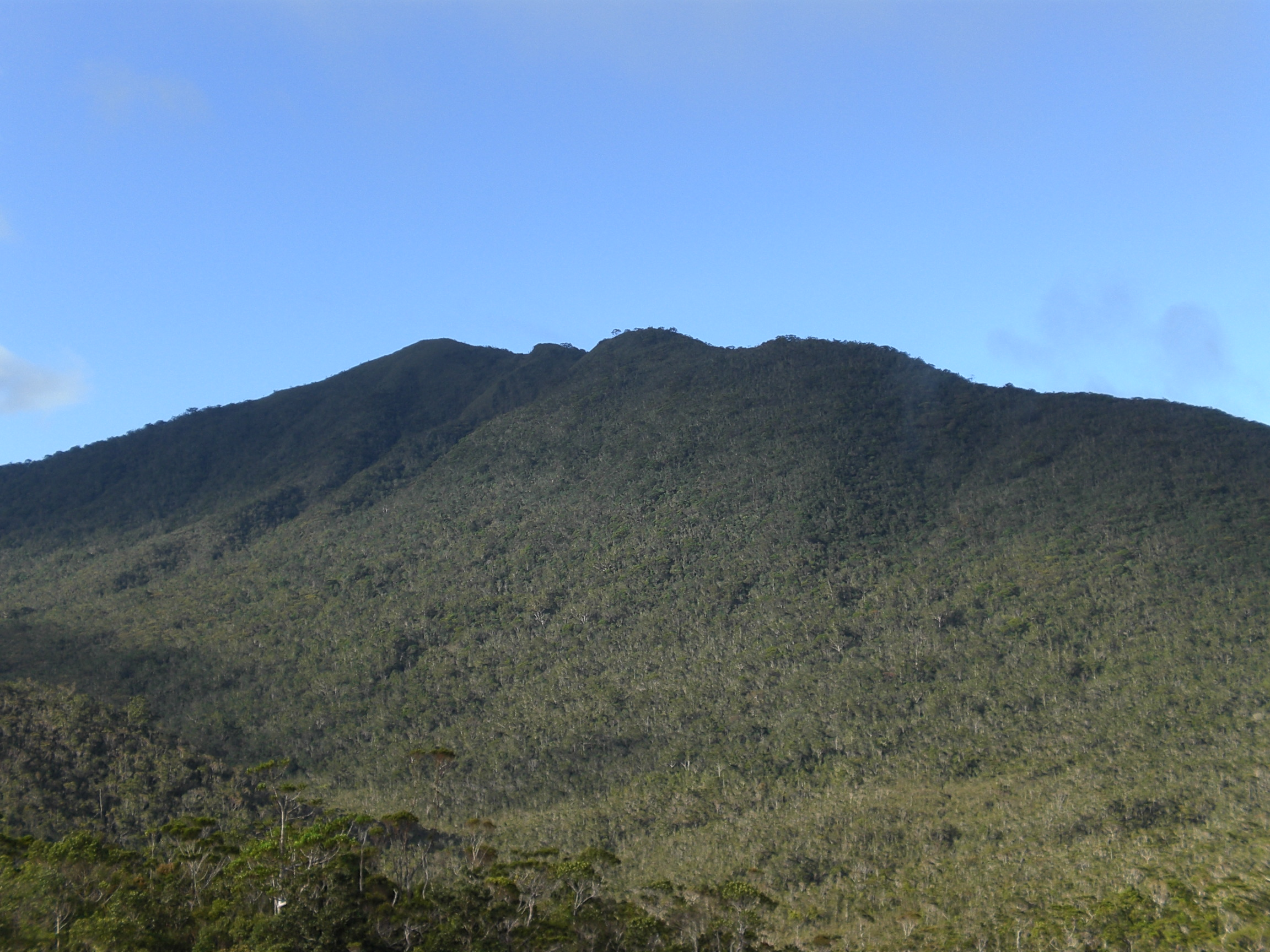
Mount Hamiguitan Range Wildlife Sanctuary

World Heritage Site or part of a World Heritage Site

Name	Area	Established	Location
Agusan Marsh	14,835.99 ha (36,660.5 acres)	1996	Agusan del Sur
Chico Island	7.77 ha (19.2 acres)	2000	Masbate
Marinduque	8,827.96 ha (21,814.4 acres)	2004	Marinduque
Mount Calavite	18,016.19 ha (44,519.0 acres)	2000	Occidental Mindoro
Mount Hamiguitan Range	6,834.00 ha (16,887.2 acres)	2004	Davao Oriental
Naro Island	109.98 ha (271.8 acres)	2000	Masbate
Rasa Island	1,983.00 ha (4,900.1 acres)	2006	Palawan
Sicogon Island	251 ha (620 acres)	2022	Iloilo
Turtle Islands	242,967.00 ha (600,384.5 acres)	1999	Tawi-Tawi

=== Wilderness areas ===
Name	Area	Established	Location
Alibijaban	430.00 ha (1,062.6 acres)	1981	Quezon
Awasan Bay Islands		1981	Surigao del Norte
Bantayan Island		1981	Cebu
Basot–Quinalang–Malabungot Islands	185.38 ha (458.1 acres)	1981	Camarines Sur
Caniago Strait Islands	210.00 ha (518.9 acres)	1981	Bohol
Cebu Strait Islands	34.00 ha (84.0 acres)	1981	Bohol
Dampalit Island		1981	Masbate
Guinauyan–Naro–Chico–Pobre Islands	23.25 ha (57.5 acres)	1981	Masbate
Isabela Monte Alto Timber Resource Corp.	1,985.00 ha (4,905.0 acres)	1987	Isabela
Majaba-Napayuan Islands	18.00 ha (44.5 acres)	1981	Masbate
Panag Bay Islands		1981	Surigao del Norte
Rasa Island		1981	Palawan

== See also ==
- List of World Heritage Sites in the Philippines
- List of Ramsar sites in the Philippines
- Biosphere reserves of the Philippines
- Environmental issues in the Philippines
