= Basilan Strait =

- Location within the Philippines Basilan Strait (Philippines)
- Location: Basilan; Zamboanga Peninsula
- Coordinates: 6°48′46.08″N 122°1′23.88″E
- Type: strait
- Etymology: Basilan

The Basilan Strait is a strait of water separating the islands of Mindanao and Basilan in the Philippines.

It was above sea level during the last ice age.
