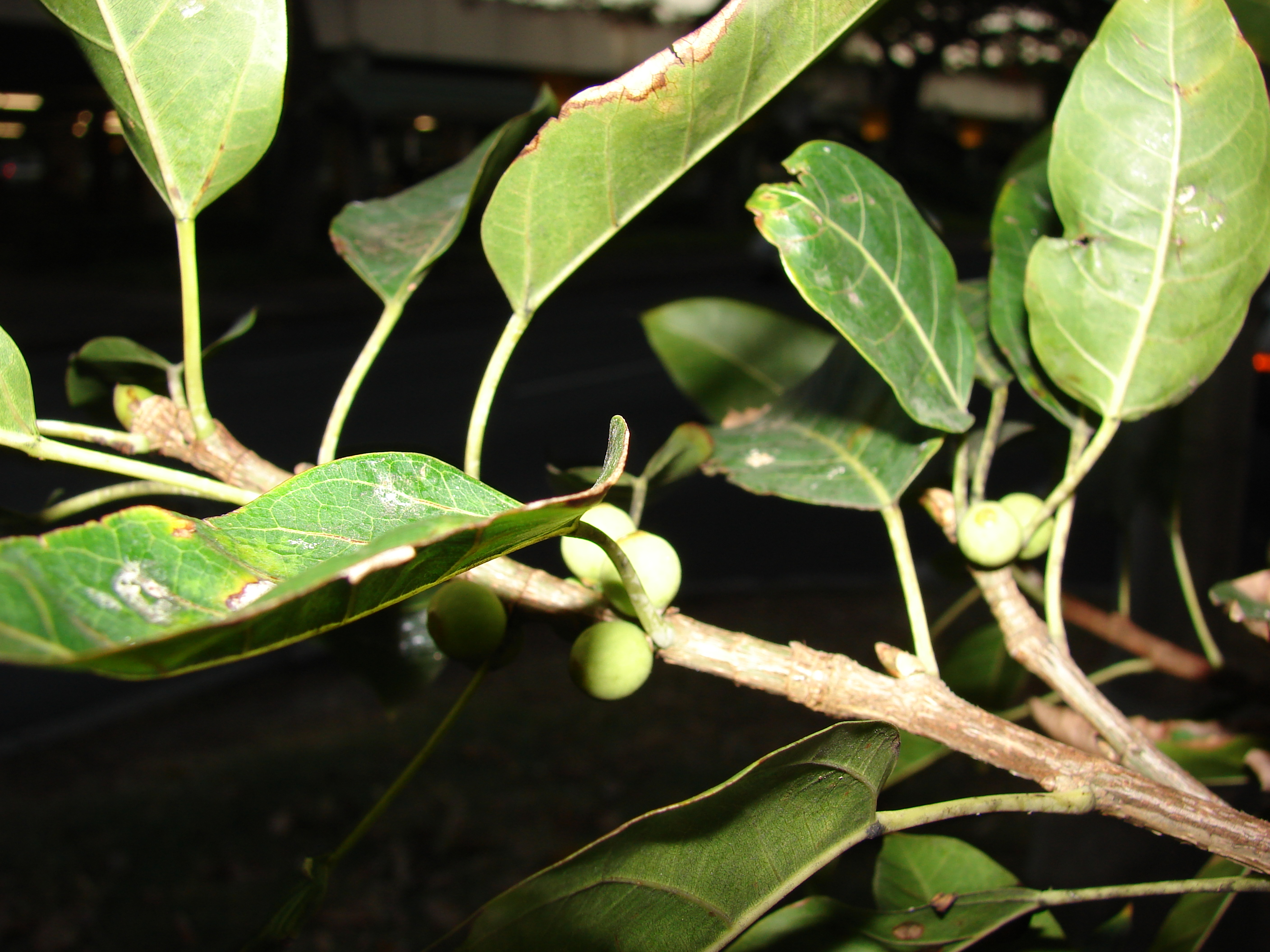

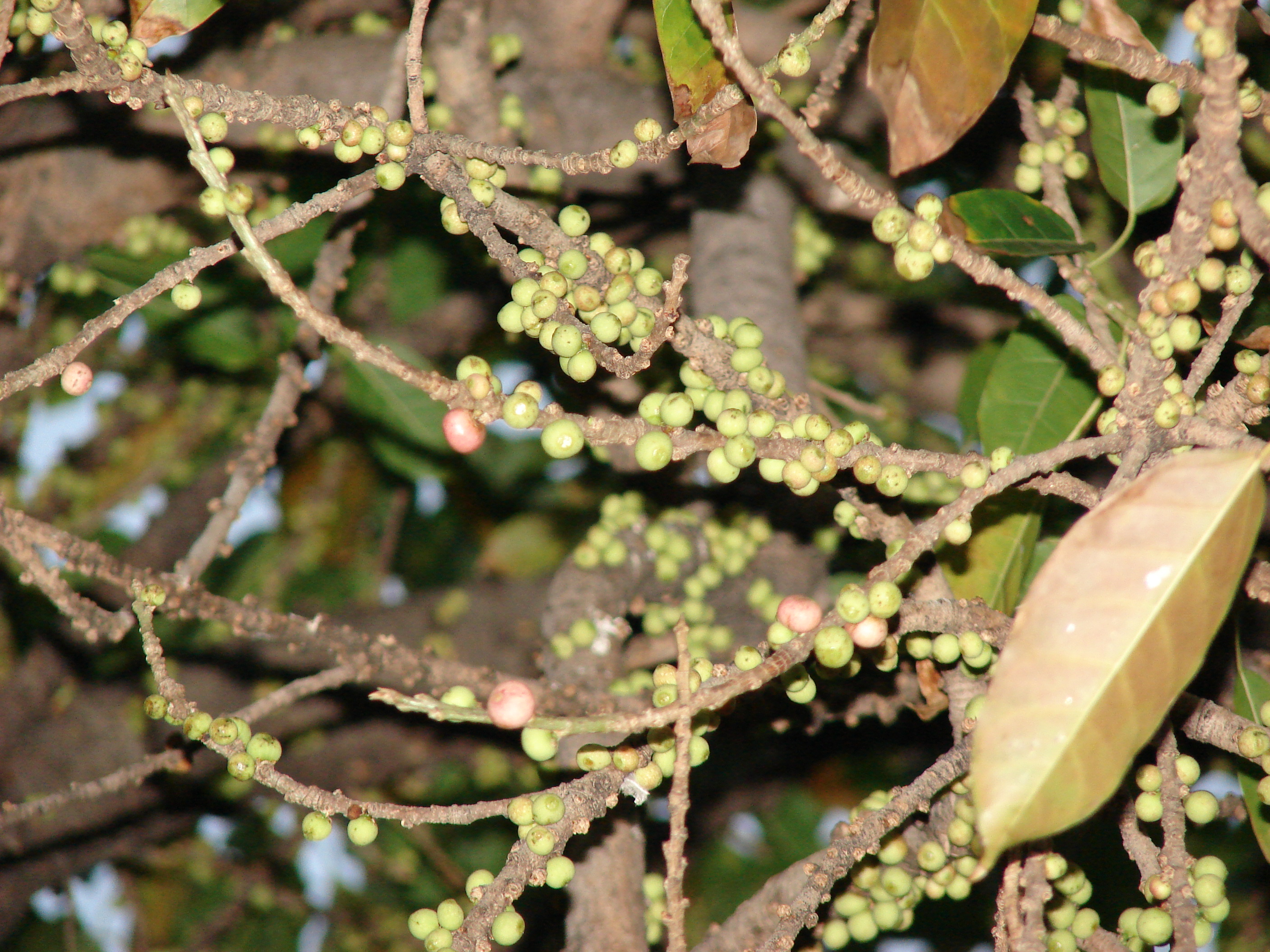
- Ficus nota in Hawaii

Conservation status
- Least Concern (IUCN 3.1)

Scientific classification
- Kingdom: Plantae
- Clade: Tracheophytes
- Clade: Angiosperms
- Clade: Eudicots
- Clade: Rosids
- Order: Rosales
- Family: Moraceae
- Genus: Ficus
- Subgenus: F. subg. Sycomorus
- Species: F. nota

Binomial name
- Ficus nota (Blanco) Merr.

Synonyms
- Ficus aspera var. nota Blanco

= Ficus nota =

Species of fig

Ficus nota is a species of flowering plant in the family Moraceae. It is commonly known as tibig or sacking tree, is a species of fig tree found near water at low elevations. Tibig is native to the Philippines and to northern Borneo in Malaysia. The tree can grow up to 9 meters high. It is primarily dispersed by birds which eat the fruits and excrete the seeds. The fruits are also edible to humans, although they are rather bland. They are usually eaten with sugar and cream in the Philippines. The young leaves are also eaten as a vegetable.
