= Northern Luzon Heroes Hill National Park =

National park in Ilocos Sur, Philippines

- IUCN category V (protected landscape/seascape)
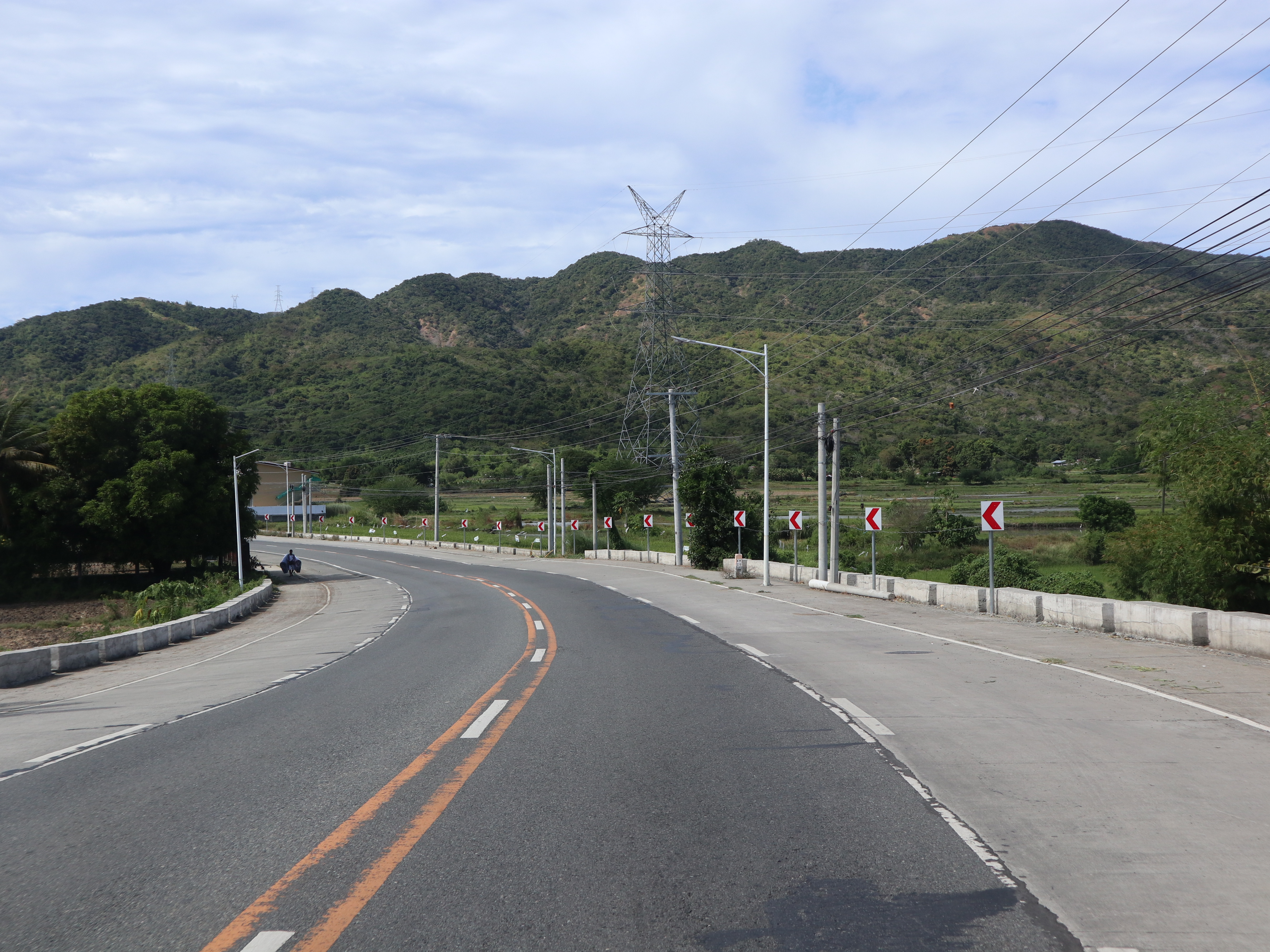
- Northern Luzon Heroes Hill National Park as viewed from MacArthur Highway in Bantay Abot, Narvacan

- Location within Luzon Location within Philippines
- Location: Ilocos Sur, Philippines
- Nearest city: Vigan
- Coordinates: 17°29′10″N 120°27′11″E
- Area: 1,316 hectares (3,250 acres)
- Established: July 9, 1963
- Governing body: Department of Environment and Natural Resources

The Northern Luzon Heroes Hill National Park is a national park in the Republic of the Philippines, located in the municipalities of Santa and partly in Narvacan in Ilocos Sur province. The protected area was established on July 9, 1963, by Proclamation No. 132.

The protected area covers 1,316 hectares (3,250 acres) of beautiful mountain scenery with elevations up to 465.4 metres (1,527 ft) adjacent to the South China Sea. Activities to the park include trekking, mountain biking or sightseeing.

== See also ==
- List of national parks of the Philippines
- List of protected areas of the Philippines
