= Matis (disambiguation) =

The Matis people are an indigenous people of Brazil.

Matis may also refer to:

- Matis language, a Panoan language
- Mati tribe, an Albanian tribe
- MATIS Group, a French-based group of companies

== People with the name ==
- Clark Matis (born 1946), American skier
- Francisco Javier Matís (1763–1851), Colombian-born painter and botanical illustrator
- Georges Matis (died 1967), French singer-songwriter and pianist
- Marcel Matis, Romanian football player
- Matis Louvel (born 1999), French cyclist
- Matúš Matis (born 1993), Slovak ice hockey player
- Morganne Matis, French singer
- Răzvan Matiș (born 2001), Romanian football player

== See also ==
- Mati (disambiguation)
- Matisse (disambiguation)
- Mathis (disambiguation)
- Mathys
- Matiz (disambiguation)
- Matis, art investment company
