= Mati =

Mati may refer to:

== Geography ==
- Mati, Davao Oriental, Philippines, a city
  - Roman Catholic Diocese of Mati
  - Mati Protected Landscape, a protected area in Davao Oriental, Philippines
  - Mati Airport, Davao Oriental, Philippines
- Mati, a barangay in San Miguel, Zamboanga del Sur, Philippines
- Mati, Greece, a holiday resort village on the east coast of the Attica region, 29 kilometres east of Athens
- Mati, Nepal, a village development committee in Dolakha District, Janakpur Zone
- Mati, Lucknow, a village in Uttar Pradesh, India
- Mati (Maya), a river in Far East Russia
- Mati (Adriatic Sea), a river in Albania
- Mat (region), a region in Albania

== People ==
- Mati (given name)
- Fred Mbiti Gideon Mati (fl. 1961-?), Kenyan politician

== Other uses ==
- Ma-Ti, character from the Captain Planet and the Planeteers TV series
- Moscow State Aviation Technological University (MATI)
- Mati Community College, Davao Oriental, Philippines
- Mati, original title of the 1977 film Beyond Reason
- máti, an evil eye-warding amulet

== See also ==
- Matti (disambiguation)
- Matis (disambiguation)
- Maty (disambiguation)
