= Mati Protected Landscape =

Protected area in the Philippines

- IUCN category V (protected landscape/seascape)
- Location within Philippines
- Location: Davao Oriental, Philippines
- Nearest city: Mati
- Coordinates: 6°57′45″N 126°12′2″E
- Area: 914.26 hectares (2,259.2 acres)
- Established: July 2, 1967 (Watershed forest reserve); September 6, 2005 (Protected landscape)
- Governing body: Department of Environment and Natural Resources

The Mati Protected Landscape is a protected area located in Davao Oriental on the southern Philippine island of Mindanao. It protects the watershed in Mati which is the source of water supply for the city's Mati Waterworks System. The protected area was established in 1967 when 890 hectares (2,200 acres) of forest in Central Mati was proclaimed as the Mati Watershed Forest Reserve through Proclamation No. 222 issued by President Ferdinand Marcos. Under the National Integrated Protected Areas System, the area was reclassified as a protected landscape with the signing of Proclamation No. 912 in 2005 by President Gloria Arroyo.

== Description ==
The Mati Protected Landscape covers an area of 914.26 hectares (2,259.2 acres) and a buffer zone of 135.76 hectares (335.5 acres) in Barangay Central in Mati. It straddles the coastal sitios of Sudlon and Ugilan containing the headwaters that supply the city's water, namely Banahaw Creek, Binuangan Creek, Licop Creek and the Bitanagan River. Its topography is mountainous and hilly, with slopes varying from flat to undulating and steep. The area's soil is characterized as sandy clay loam belonging to the Camansa series.

The Mati City Proper borders the protected area and its peripheral zone to the north, the Pujada Bay to the east, the barangay of Badas to the south, and the northern foothills of the Hamiguitan Range to the west. It is accessible via a barangay road from the city proper where the Mati Airport is located. It can also be reached via a 165-kilometre (103 mi) highway from Davao City, the region's capital and largest city.

== Flora and fauna ==
The protected area is known to harbor several bird species, some of which are endemic to the region, such as the Philippine collared dove, white-eared brown dove, Philippine serpent-eagle, Philippine spine-tailed swift, lowland white-eye, Philippine bulbul, Philippine falconet, rufous coucal, as well as olive-backed sunbird, chestnut-headed bee-eater, rufous-tailed jungle flycatcher, long-tailed shrike and black-naped oriole.

Its flora include common agricultural plants such as coconuts, some fruit trees and ipil-ipil.
