= Mathis (disambiguation) =

Mathis is a surname and a given name. It may also refer to:

- Mathis, Missouri, an unincorporated community
- Mathis, Texas, United States, a city
  - Mathis Independent School District, a public school district
- Mathis Spur, Queen Elizabeth Land, Antarctica
- Mathis Nunataks, Marie Byrd Land, Antarctica
- Mathis Airport, Georgia, United States, a private airport
- Mathis (cars), a firm in Alsace which produced cars between 1910 and 1950
