= Matiz =

Matiz may refer to:

- Daewoo Matiz, or Matiz, a make of car
- Matiz, a surname; notable people include:
  - Francisco Javier Matiz (1763–1851), Colombian-born painter and botanical illustrator
  - Giacomo Matiz (born 1986), (born 1986), Italian skier
  - Leo Matiz (1917–1998), Colombian photographer, newspaper publisher, and painter
  - Mabel Matiz (born 1985), Turkish pop music singer-songwriter

== See also ==
- Matis (disambiguation)
