= MXI =

MXI may refer to:

- Computer bus bridge link, MXI link for PCI-to-PXI
- The Roman numeral that is the year 1011
- The IATA code of Mati Airport in Philippines.
