= Mathis =

Mathis is a name of French and German origin. It is common as a surname and is also a masculine given name.

== People with the surname ==
- Buster Mathis (1943–1995), American heavyweight boxer
- Buster Mathis Jr. (born 1970), American heavyweight boxer
- Clint Mathis (born 1976), American soccer player
- Damarri Mathis (born 1999), American football player
- Dawson Mathis (1940–2017), American politician
- Doug Mathis (born 1983), American baseball player
- Edith Mathis (1938–2025), Swiss singer
- Émile Mathis (1880–1956), German-French automobile pioneer
- Greg Mathis (born 1960), American judge
- Ida Elizabeth Brandon Mathis (1857–1925), American agricultural reformer
- James C. Mathis III (born 1974), American voice actor
- Jeff Mathis (born 1983), American baseball catcher
- Jeff W. Mathis III (1955–2016), American Major General
- Jill Mathis (born 1964), American photographer
- Johnny Mathis (born 1935), American pop singer
- Kevin Mathis (born 1974), American football player
- Lionel Mathis (born 1981), French football player
- Marcel Mathis (born 1991), Austrian alpine skier
- Milly Mathis (1901–1965), French actress
- Ochaun Mathis (born 1999), American football player
- Phidarian Mathis (born 1998), American football player
- Rashean Mathis (born 1980), American football player
- Reggie Mathis (born 1956), American football player
- Rémi Mathis (born 1982), French historian
- Robert Mathis (born 1981), American football player
- Samantha Mathis (born 1970), American actor
- Susie Mathis (born 1947), British pop singer and radio presenter
- Terance Mathis (born 1967), American football player

== People with the given name ==
- Mathis Bailey (born 1981), American-Canadian novelist and fiction writer
- Mathis Bolly (born 1990), Norwegian–Ivorian footballer playing in Germany
- Mathis Künzler (born 1978), Swiss actor
- Mathis Mathisen (born 1937), Norwegian teacher, novelist, playwright and children's writer
- Mathis Mootz (born 1976), German electronic musician and DJ
- Mathis Wackernagel (born 1962), Swiss-born sustainability advocate
- Mathis Häseler (born 2002), German handballer

== Fictional characters ==
- Title character of Mathis der Maler (opera), by Paul Hindemith
- René Mathis, ally of James Bond
- Jude Mathis, protagonist of Tales of Xillia video game
- Mathis, supporting character of 2017-2018 Nickelodeon show Mysticons
