= General Prendergast =

General Prendergast may refer to:

- Harry Prendergast (1834–1913, British Army general
- Sir Thomas Prendergast, 1st Baronet (c. 1660–1709), Irish brigadier general
- William Prendergast (general) (fl. 1990s–2020s), U.S. Army brigadier general
