= Matisse (disambiguation) =

Henri Matisse (1869–1954) was a French artist.

Matisse may also refer to:

- Matisse (crater), a crater on Mercury
- Matisse (Greek band), an alternative rock band from Athens, Greece
- Matisse (Mexican band), a pop group from Mexicali, Mexico
- Matisse (singer) (born 1985), American actress, model, singer and songwriter
- Jules O'Dwyer & Matisse, a dog trick act on Britain's Got Talent
- Project Matisse, a GUI design tool for NetBeans
- Matisse ITC, a typeface owned by the International Typeface Corporation
- AMD Matisse, the code name for the desktop line of AMD's Zen 2 CPUs
- Brit Smith, formerly known as Matisse

== People with the name ==
- Georges Matisse (1874–1961), French philosopher of science
- Paul Matisse (born 1933), American artist and inventor, son of Pierre Matisse, grandson of Henri Matisse
- Pierre Matisse (1900–1989), French-American art dealer, son of Henri Matisse
- Matisse Thybulle (born 1997), American basketball player
- Matilda Matisse, a character from the Japanese manga series Shaman King

== See also ==
- Daewoo Matiz
- Metisse (disambiguation)
