= Davao Oriental State University =

Public university in Davao Oriental, Philippines

- Pamantasang Pampamahalaan ng Davao Oriental (Filipino)
- Other names: DOrSU, Tate
- Former names: Mati Community College; Davao Oriental State College of Science and Technology
- Type: State University
- Established: December 13, 1989
- Academic affiliations: Philippine Association of State Universities and Colleges (PASUC), Mindanao Association of State Colleges and Universities Foundation, Inc. (MASCUF)
- President: Roy Ponce
- Students: 15,000 (first semester 2022-2023)
- Location: City of Mati, Philippines; 6°55′54″N 126°15′17″E
- Campus: City of Mati (Main); San Isidro; Cateel; Banaybanay
- Website: www.doscst.edu.ph
- Location in Mindanao Location in the Philippines

Davao Oriental State University (DOrSU) is a state-funded research-based coeducational higher education institution in Mati, Davao Oriental, Philippines. It was founded on December 13, 1989.

== History ==
=== Mati Community College ===
The Mati Community College was a local government-run community college established in 1972 that offered liberal arts and business-oriented programs. It was headed by Dr. Leopoldo Bravo of the Department of Education, Culture and Sports.

=== Early years: 1989–1997 ===
On December 13, 1989, the Mati Community College (MCC) was converted into Davao Oriental State College of Science and Technology (DOSCST) by virtue of Republic Act 6807. The aforementioned law was authored by Thelma Z. Almario when she was the Representative of the 2nd district of Davao Oriental.

On May 20, 1990, Dr. Julieta I. Ortiz was appointed as founding president. The newly chartered college started operations in June 1990.

With its new mandate provided by its charter, curricular programs were reoriented towards science and technology. Classes were initially held in three buildings located at the old site at Barangay Sainz until the college moved to its present 10-hectare site, 5 km away from Mati, Davao Oriental proper in September 1991. Mindanao Agro-Pioneers Corporation owned by the heirs of the late Don Jose Corro Martinez Sr. donated this site, a flat land about 300 meters from the shores of Pujada Bay.

On the new site, the initial structures were built, a concrete road leading to the campus was constructed, electricity and communication lines were connected. Bright and promising professionals were recruited to man the faculty, new academic programs were crafted, and the arduous path towards instituting relevant research and extension programs was blazed. The difficult task of instituting an academic culture comparable to national standards also commenced.

To speed up institutional growth, Dr. Ortiz established linkage with other higher education institutions, including other government and private organizations. Soon, some faculty members were sent for advanced studies, senior faculty from established universities were invited, while the instructional, research and extension programs began to take on respectable form and substance. The college's library collection registered rapid growth and instructional facilities were relentlessly improved. As the early batches of students graduated, so did they register respectable performance in licensure examinations and desirability among employers.

=== 1997–present ===
Presidents of
Davao Oriental State College of Science and Technology
Dr. Julieta I. Ortiz, 1990–1997
Dr. Jonathan A. Bayogan, 1997–2007
Dr. Grace G. Lopez , 2007–2011
Dr. Edito B. Sumile, 2011–2021
Dr. Roy G. Ponce, 2021–present

Dr. Jonathan A. Bayogan was appointed as second president in June 1997 and was reappointed for a second term in June 2003. During his term, extension campuses were established in San Isidro in November 1997 and in Cateel in June 1999. Additional structures were built, instructional and support facilities were improved while communication facilities were kept up-to-date. The faculty profile tremendously improved through faculty development aided largely through grants and assistance from the Commission on Higher Education, bilateral scholarships and local assistance. Curricular programs were improved and short-term courses were upgraded to degree programs. Graduate programs in education were eventually opened through the assistance of local government units.

As a quality assurance scheme, academic programs were subjected to accreditation and some attained Level 2 status in due time. Linkage with other colleges and universities were strengthened through resource sharing and collaboration. Research and extension developed as faculty outputs were presented and gained acceptance in regional and national fora. Projects funded by agencies like the Commission on Higher Education, the Department of Science and Technology, the Department of Agriculture, Department of Agrarian Reform, USAID, AusAid began to come in. Graduates did not only perform well in licensure examinations but a few also barged into the Top Ten circle.

The college also grew in its effort to preserve and showcase the region's culture and arts. The college gained recognition by representing the municipality, the province and the region in regional and national cultural presentations. The college's culture and arts groups, Dagmay, and Pagdungawan were feted with recognition among cultural groups, regionally and nationally.

Capping the term of Dr. Bayogan was the college's elevation from Level 1 to a Level 3 state college, using a nationwide leveling criteria for all state universities and colleges (SUC) in the country. DOSCST has the distinction of having the least budget allocation among Level 3 SUCs.

Dr. Grace G. Lopez assumed office as president in July 2007. She was succeeded by Dr. Edito B. Sumile who assumed office in January 2012.

The leadership of Dr. Edito B. Sumile was marked by rapid developments in its infrastructure, which included the construction of the new Administration Building and the new Main Campus Library and the renovation and expansion of the Main Campus Oval. The main highlight of his term was the conversion of DOSCST into Davao Oriental State University (DOrSU) in 2018. Sumile was succeeded by Dr. Roy G. Ponce in 2021. DOrSU's universityhood was formally declared and inaugurated in 2021.

== Campus ==
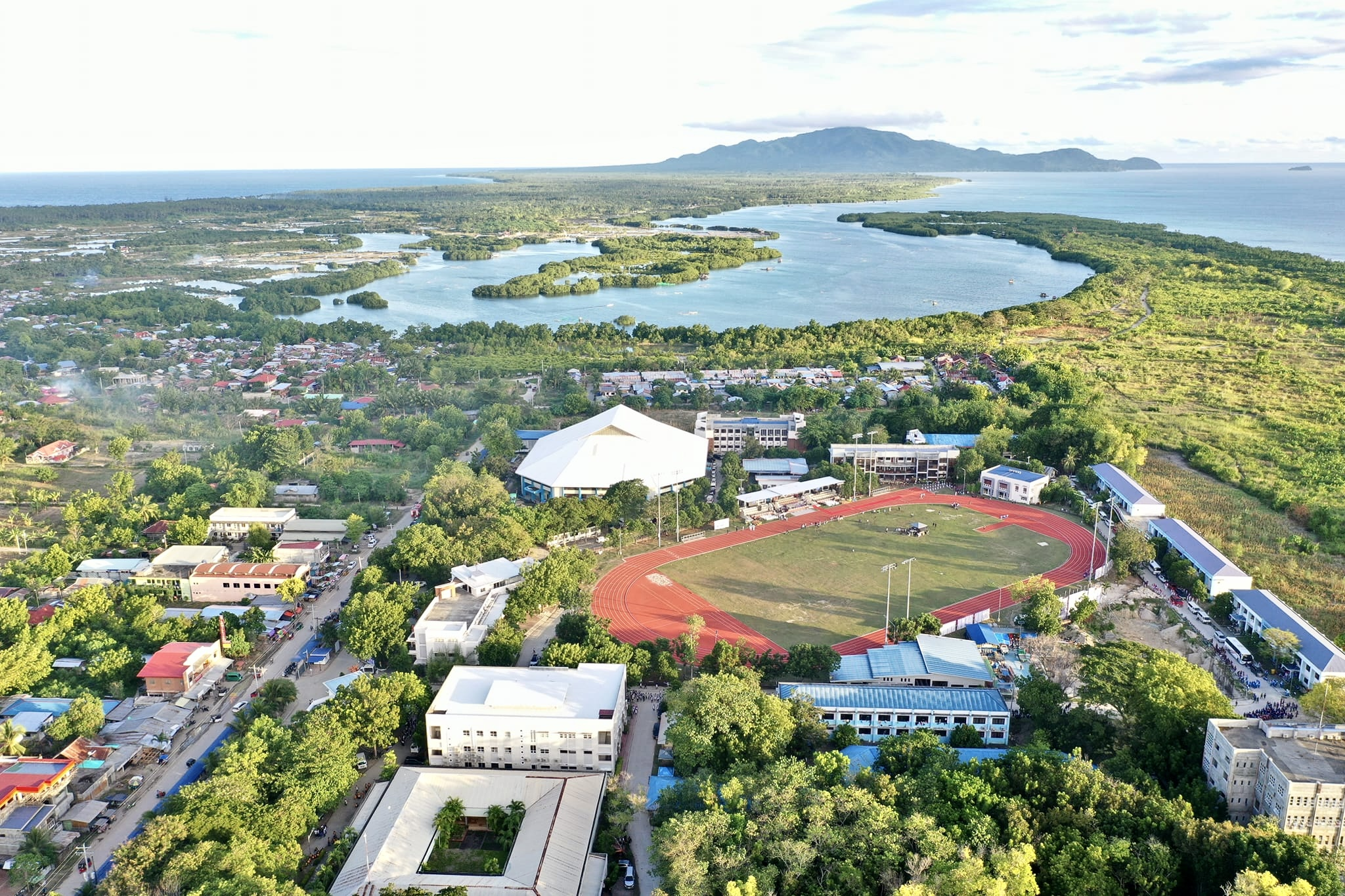
The Davao Oriental State University Main Campus located in the City of Mati with the Guang-guang Mangrove Nature Reserve, Pujada Bay (right) and Mayo Bay (left) in the background.

The current 10-hectare main campus is located at Martinez Drive, Guang-guang, Dahican, City of Mati. It was donated by the Mindanao Agro-Pioneers Corporation owned by the heirs of the late Don José Corro Martínez Sr. It is a flat land approximately 300 meters from the shores of Pujada Bay.

It also has extension campuses in the municipalities of Banaybanay, San Isidro, and Baganga, all located in the province of Davao Oriental.

== Academic programs ==
=== Doctorate Programs ===
- Doctor of Philosophy in Biology major in Biodiversity
- Doctor of Philosophy in Environmental Science
- Doctor of Education major in Educational Leadership and Management

=== Master Programs ===
- Master of Science in Teaching – General Science
- Master of Science in Teaching – Mathematics
- Master of Arts in Education – Education Management
- Master of Arts in Education – Teaching English
- Master in Business Administration
- Master of Science in Environmental Science

=== Undergraduate programs ===
==== Faculty of Nursing and Allied Health Sciences (FNAHS) ====
- Bachelor of Science in Nursing

==== Faculty of Agriculture and Life Sciences (FALS) ====
- Bachelor of Science in Agribusiness Management
- Bachelor of Science in Agricultural Technology
- Bachelor of Science in Biology
- Bachelor of Science in Environmental Science

==== Faculty of Business Management (FBM) ====
- Bachelor of Science in Business Administration
- Bachelor of Science in Hospitality Management

Faculty of Criminal Justice and Education (FCJE)

- Bachelor of Science in Criminology

==== Faculty of Computing, Engineering and Technology (FaCET) ====
- Bachelor of Science in Civil Engineering
- Bachelor of Industrial Technology Management
- Bachelor of Science in Information Technology
- Bachelor of Science in Mathematics with Research Statistics

==== Faculty of Teacher Education (FTED) ====
- Bachelor of Elementary Education
- Bachelor of Early Childhood Education
- Bachelor of Secondary Education major in Biological Sciences
- Bachelor of Secondary Education major in English
- Bachelor of Secondary Education major in Filipino
- Bachelor of Secondary Education major in Mathematics
- Bachelor of Secondary Education major in Science
- Bachelor of Physical Education major in School Physical Education
- Bachelor of Special Needs Education

Faculties of Human Sciences and Communication (FHSC)

- Bachelor of Development Communication
- Bachelor of Arts in Political Science
- Bachelor of Science in Psychology
