= Lessing (crater) =

Crater on Mercury

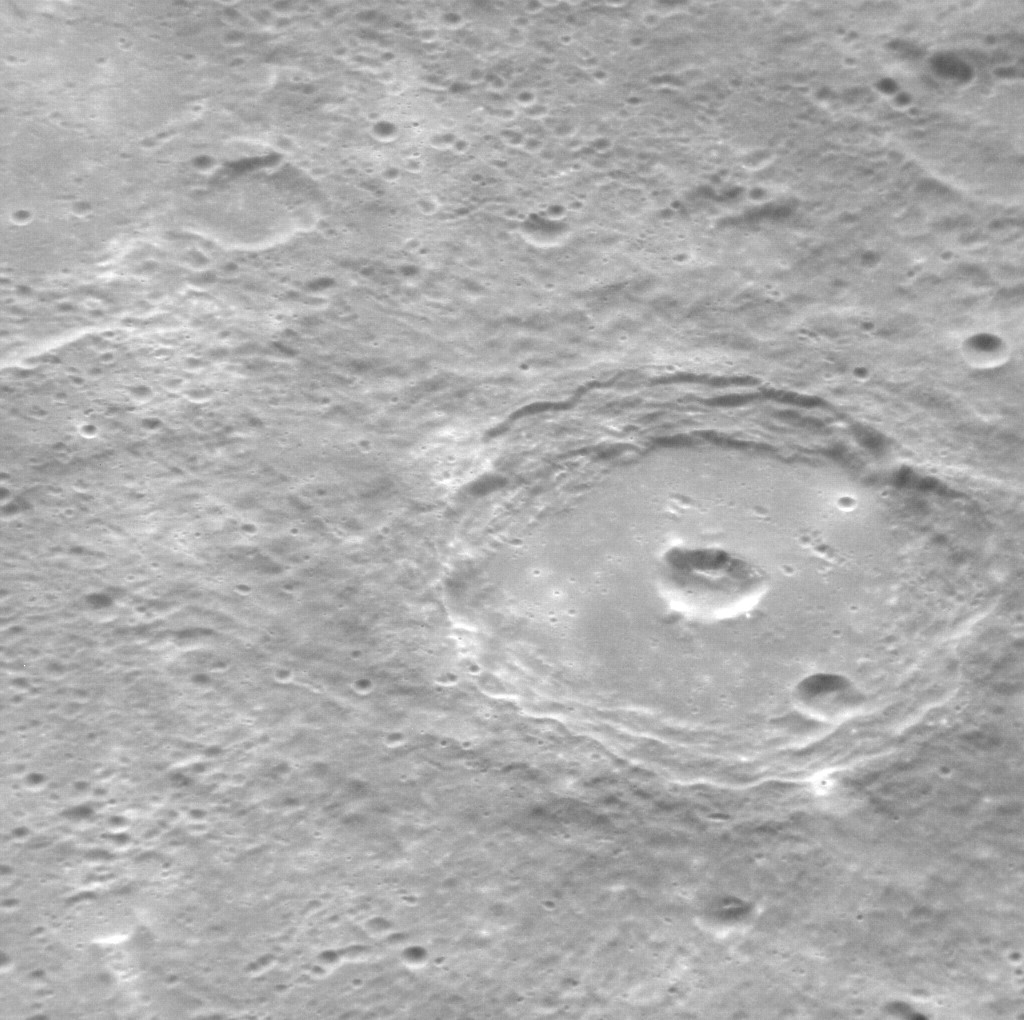
- MESSENGER NAC image of Lessing
- Feature type: Impact crater
- Location: Michelangelo quadrangle, Mercury
- Coordinates: 28.50°S 90.34°W
- Diameter: 95 km (59 mi)
- Eponym: Gotthold Ephraim Lessing

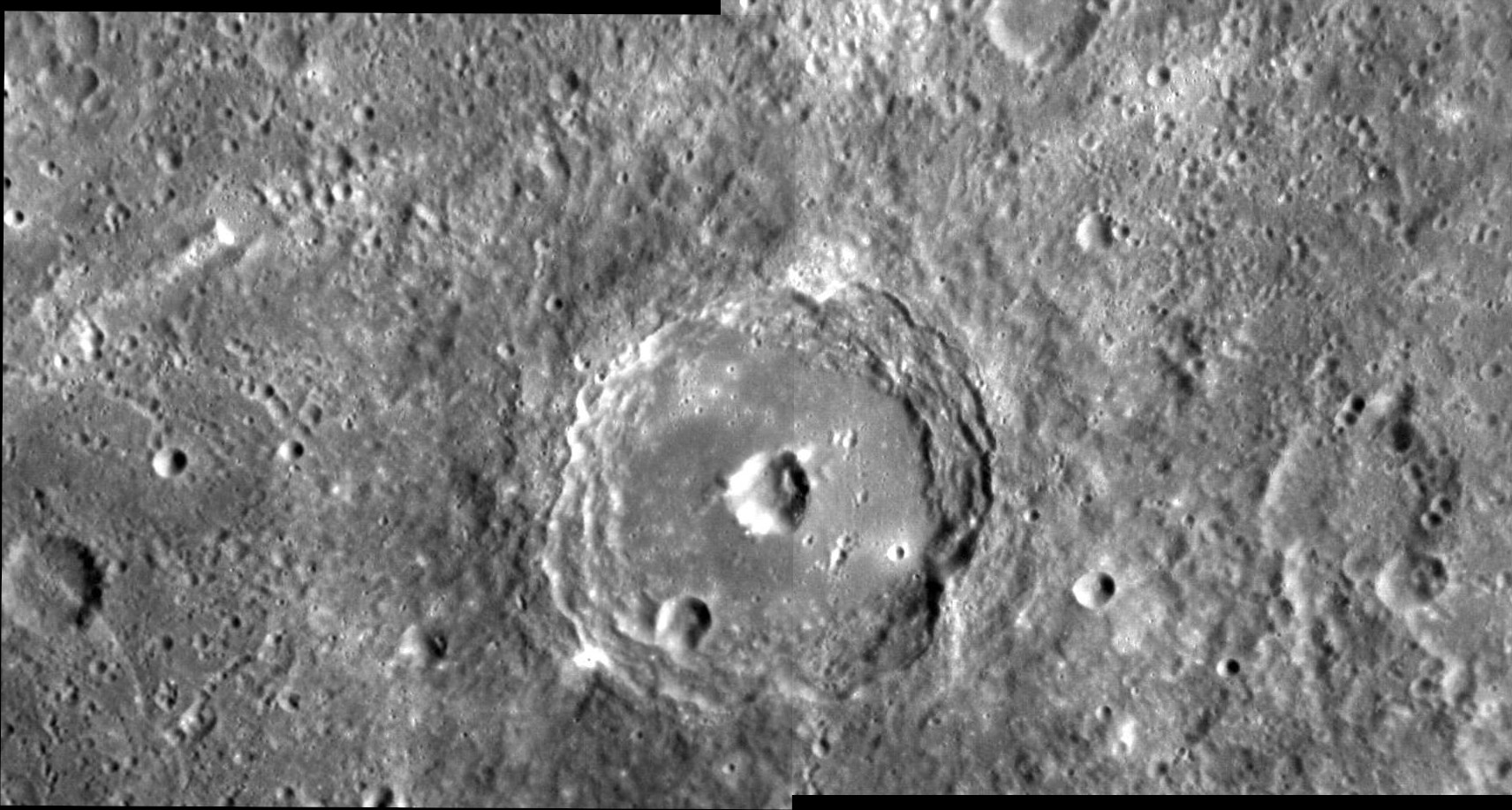
MESSENGER mosaic

Lessing is a crater on Mercury. Its name was adopted by the International Astronomical Union in 1985. Lessing is named for the German writer Gotthold Ephraim Lessing, who lived from 1729 to 1781.

Lessing is south of the larger crater Matisse.
