= Subangan Museum =

- Established: January 8, 2014
- Location: Mati, Davao Oriental, Philippines
- Coordinates: 6°56′39.3″N 126°14′54.0″E
- Type: Local museum
- Owner: Davao Oriental provincial government

The Subangan Davao Oriental Provincial Museum, simply known as the Subangan Museum, is a local museum in Mati, Davao Oriental, Philippines. It showcase exhibits related to the province of Davao Oriental.

== History ==
The Subangan Museum was inaugurated on January 8, 2014. It was built and conceptualized by the Davao Oriental provincial government under Governor Corazon Malanyaon. Malanyaon has already planned to build a museum as early as 2010, when a sperm whale got stranded in the town of Governor Generoso in 2010 with the provincial executive suggesting that the remains of the cetacean be hosted in a museum. "Subangon" came from the Cebuano term for "east" or "sunrise", even the word "Subangan" comes from the Bicolano term for "east".

== Facilities ==
The Subangan Museum is situated at the Provincial Tourism Complex in barangay Datu Martin Marundan in Mati, Davao Oriental. It is hosted inside a two-storey building which covers a floor area of 1,000 m^{2} (11,000 sq ft). The building's lead architect is Edmundo Viacrucis who was supported by architects Cesar Rey Gamalong and Lachelle Marie Ravelo. The museum project costed ₱25 million.

== Exhibits ==
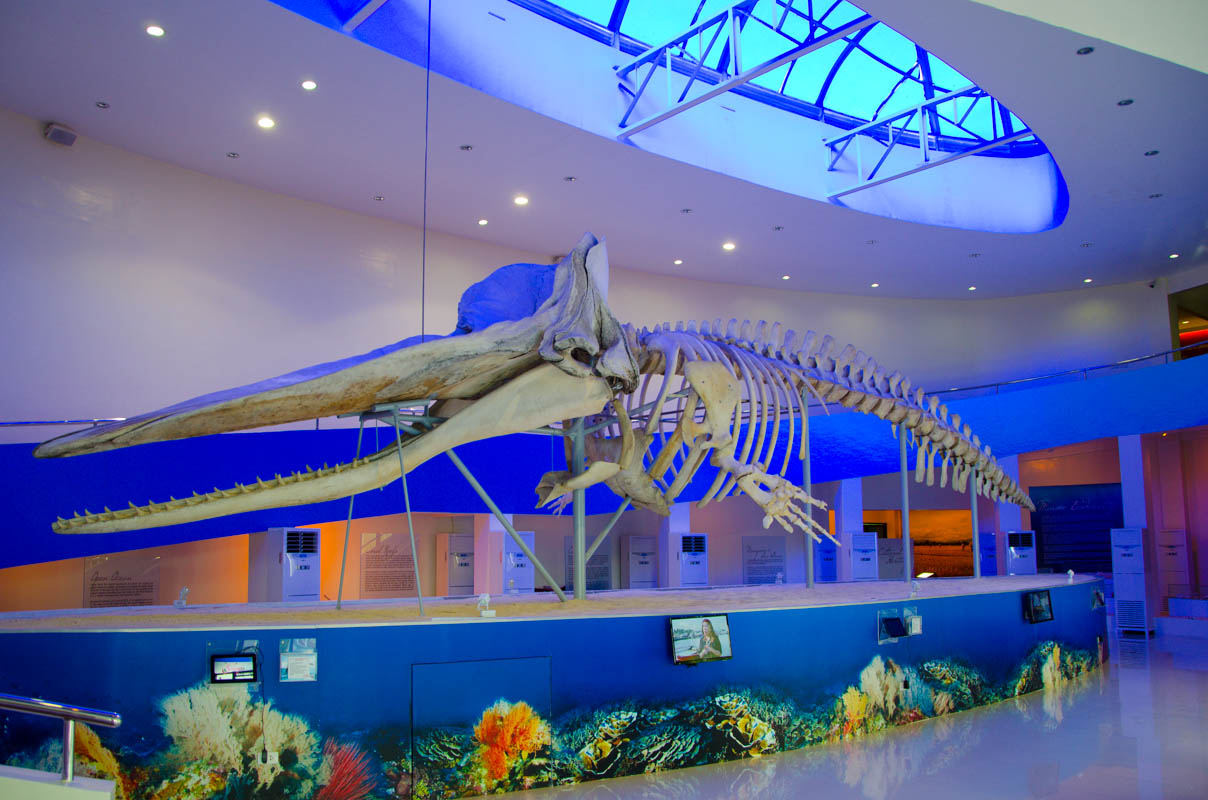
Skeleton of Davor, the sperm whale

The Subangan Museum features themed exhibitions related to Davao Oriental's natural, cultural and historical heritage. The museum has three dedicated section devoted to these three aspects of the province heritage. The skeleton of a 16.15 m (53.0 ft) sperm whale, named Davor, serves as the centerpiece of the Subangan. The skeleton, sourced from a whale that beached in Governor Generoso, is reportedly the largest in the Philippines. The culture of the Mandaya and Kalagan ethnic groups are also showcased. The museum also has a memorial dedicated to the victims of Typhoon Bopha (Pablo) which struck Mindanao in 2012, two years prior to the museum's opening.
