= Francisco Rabat =

Filipino politician and basketball player

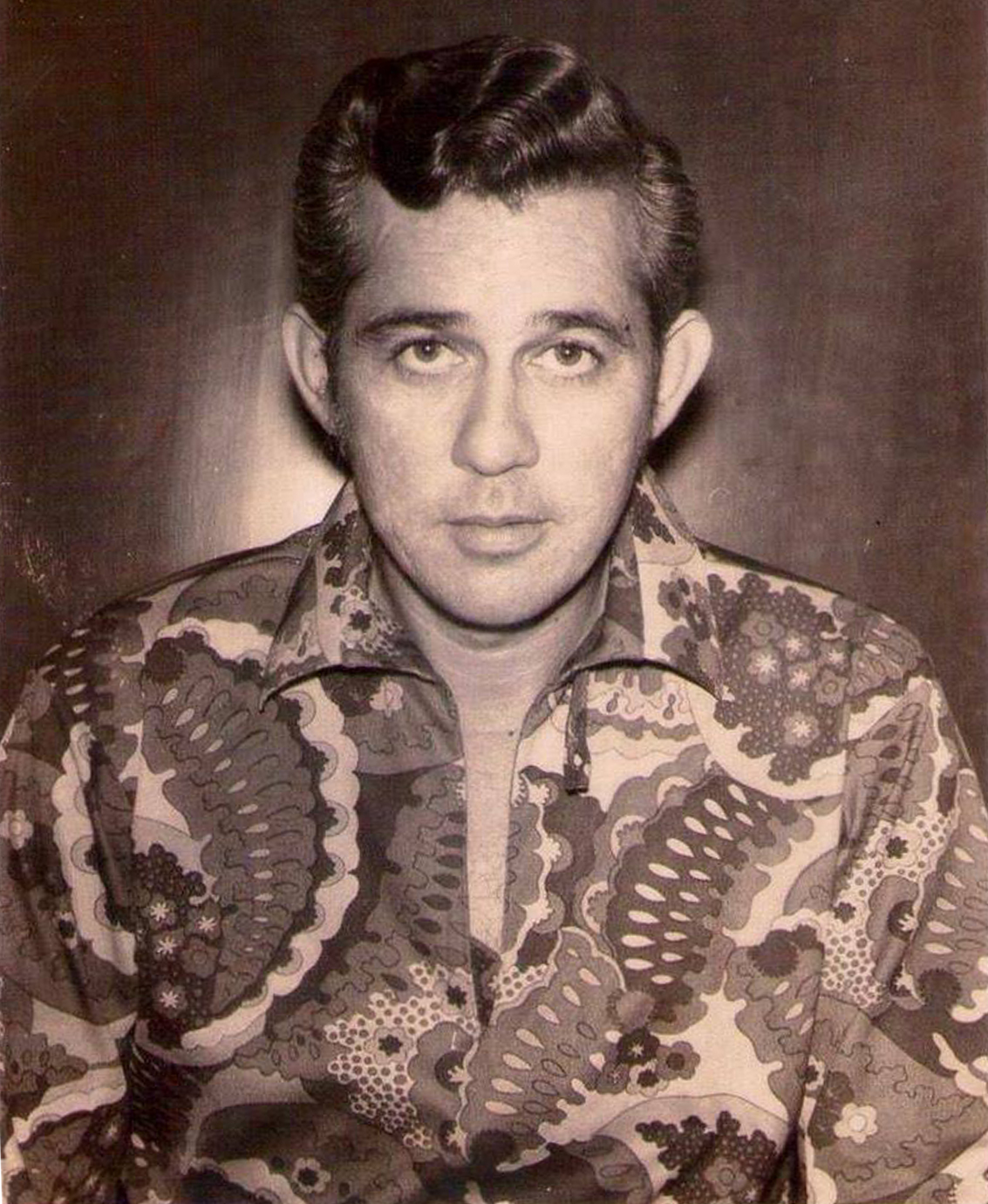

4th Governor of Davao Oriental
- In office 1978–1986
- Preceded by: Teodoro Palma Gil
- Succeeded by: Josefina Sibala

Mayor of Mati
- In office June 30, 2001 – June 30, 2007
- Succeeded by: Michelle Nakpil Rabat

Personal details
- Born: Francisco Garcia Rabat; June 19, 1934
- Died: July 19, 2008 (aged 74) Davao City, Philippines
- Spouse: Merced Edith Nakpil
- Children: 5
- Basketball career

Personal information
- Listed height: 5 ft 11 in (1.80 m)

Career information
- High school: Ateneo de Davao (Davao City)
- College: Ateneo
- Number: 4
Medals
Men's basketball
Representing Philippines
FIBA World Championship
Bronze medal – third place	1954 Rio de Janeiro	Team
Asian Games
Gold medal – first place	1954 Manila	Team

Francisco "Paking" Garcia Rabat (June 19, 1934 – July 19, 2008) was a Filipino politician and basketball player.

== Basketball career ==
Rabat was a member of the Philippine national basketball team and was part of the squad that won the bronze medal at the 1954 FIBA World Championship, the best finish ever by the country in the World Championships, losing only to the United States and Brazil. He was given the monicker, "Rajah of Rebound". At 18 years old, Rabat was also the youngest player in the squad. In college basketball, he played for the Ateneo Blue Eagles and was the MVP in the 1953 NCAA basketball championship.

== Political career ==
Rabat served as Governor of Davao Oriental from 1978 to 1986. As governor, he oversaw the project for the Mati Airport. He also served as the mayor of Mati. With Joel Mayo Almario, whose family is a political rival of the Rabats, Rabat successfully lobbied for the cityhood of Mati. Mati, a former municipality, became a component city on June 19, 2007, after a plebiscite held the day before. He sought re-election in 2007 local elections but withdrew his bid after he was diagnosed with cancer. His daughter Michelle Nakpil Rabat campaigned in his stead and was elected, becoming Mati's second mayor as a component city.

== Death ==
Rabat died on July 19, 2008, while confined at the Davao Doctors Hospital due to cancer.

== Personal life ==
He was married with Edith Nakpil, a former beauty queen who competed in the Miss Philippines pageant. Rabat had four sons and a daughter with Nakpil. His daughter, Michelle Nakpil Rabat subsequently became Mayor of Mati for two consecutive terms.
