= Metisse (disambiguation) =

Metisse is a 2.5D windowing system, based on the X Window System.

Metisse or Métisse may also refer to:

- Métisse (band), an Irish/African Soul/Electronica band
- Métisse (film), a 1993 French film directed by Mathieu Kassovitz
- Métisse Motorcycles, a motorcycle manufacturer based in Carswell near Faringdon, Oxfordshire, England
- Citroën C-Métisse, a French concept car
- Métis, an Aboriginal people in Canada who trace their descent to mixed First Nations parentage

== See also ==
- Matisse (disambiguation)
