= Joint Task Force – Civil Support =

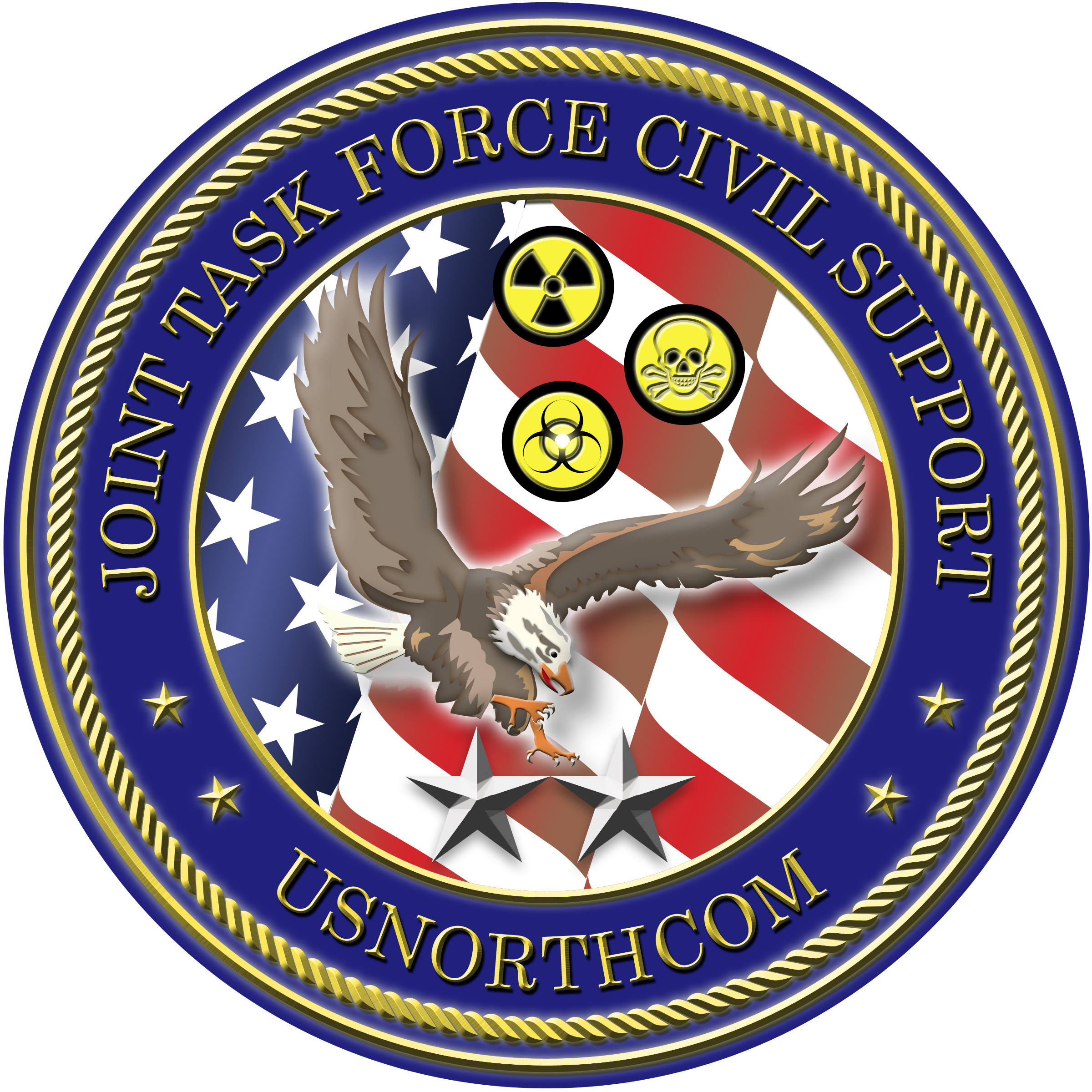
Emblem of Joint Task Force Civil Support.

Joint Task Force Civil Support (JTF-CS) is a subordinate command of United States Northern Command headquartered at Fort Eustis. Its mission is to provide command and control for Department of Defense forces deployed in support of the National Response Plan, specifically, managing the consequences of a domestic chemical, biological, radiological, nuclear, or high-yield explosive (CBRNE) incident. JTFCS consists of discrete units of specialized consequence management troops from all services called the DOD CBRN Response Forces (DCRF), as well as civilian subject matter experts, assigned from various agencies. JTF-CS is able to respond anywhere in North America within 12 hours to lead technical and non-technical search and rescue, security, hazard analysis, evidence collection, mission command, logistics support, aviation support, and medical support after an actual or threatened CBRNE incident. JTF-CS is also a collaborative partner in planning for and responding to identified National Special Security Events (NSSE) around the United States.

JTF-CS was created in 1999 to fulfill the Congressional mandate in the 1998 Nunn-Lugar-Domenici legislation for the Secretary of Defense to develop and enhance the federal government's capability to prevent and respond to terrorist attacks.

The current commander of JTF-CS is Brigadier General Tanya S. McGonegal, Army National Guard.

== List of commanders ==
	Name	Branch	Term began	Term ended
14.	BG Tanya S. McGonegal	United States Army National Guard	February 2024	Present
13.	COL Carl L. Parsons	United States Army National Guard	December 2023	February 2024
12.	MG William J. Prendergast IV	United States Army National Guard	September 2023	December 2023
11.	COL Timothy J. Sulzner	United States Army National Guard	January 2023	September 2023
10.	MG Jeffrey P. Van	United States Army National Guard	August 2020	December 2022
9.	MG William A. Hall	United States Army National Guard	June 2018	August 2020
8.	MG Richard J. Gallant	United States Army National Guard	July 2016	June 2018
7.	MG William F. Roy	United States Army National Guard	July 2014	July 2016
6.	MG Jeff W. Mathis III	United States Army National Guard	July 2012	July 2014
5.	Maj Gen Jonathan T. Tracey	United States Air National Guard	July 2010	July 2012
4.	MG Daniel E. Long Jr.	United States Army National Guard	June 2007	July 2010
3.	MG Bruce E. Davis	United States Army National Guard	December 2004	June 2007
2.	MG Jerry W. Grizzle	United States Army National Guard	October 2001	December 2004
1.	MG Bruce M. Lawlor	United States Army National Guard	October 1999	October 2001
