= Matisse (crater) =

Crater on Mercury

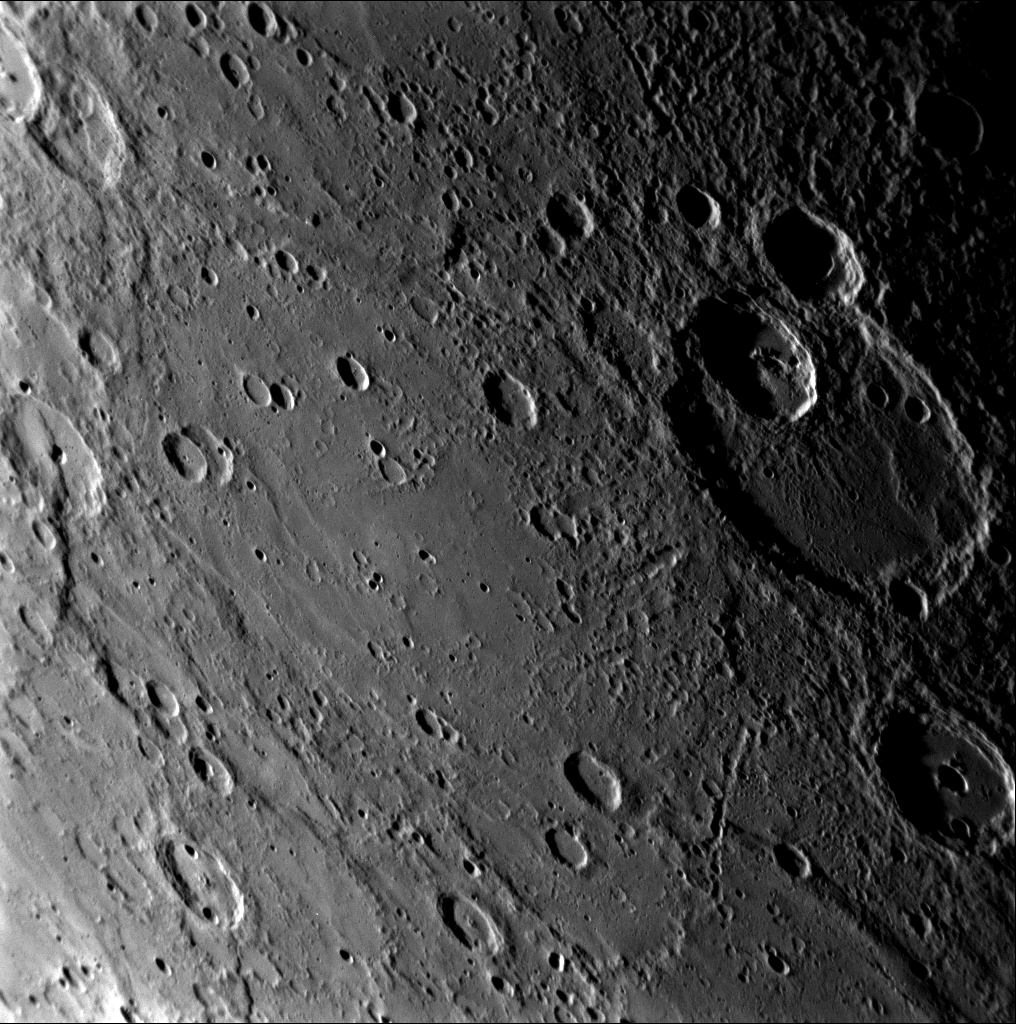
- MESSENGER photo of Matisse (right), from its first flyby in January 2008
- Feature type: Impact crater
- Location: Michelangelo quadrangle, Mercury
- Coordinates: 23.80°S 90.19°W
- Diameter: 189 km (117 mi)
- Eponym: Henri Matisse

Matisse is an impact crater on the southern hemisphere of Mercury. Matisse takes its name from the French artist Henri Matisse, and it was named by the IAU in 1976.

Two faculae (high-albedo areas) within and near Matisse were named by the IAU in May 2023. One is called Ngu Facula, located within an unnamed crater in northern Matisse. The other is called Ahas Facula, located in an unnamed crater northeast of Matisse. Both of these faculae have irregular, rimless pits near their centers, and the combination of the presence of irregular pits with the bright halos around them support interpretation of the faculae as a sites of explosive volcanism.

Within Matisse is a dark spot of low reflectance material (LRM). The dark spot is associated with hollows. The dark spot is located on the southwest rim of the unnamed crater containing Ngu Facula.

The smaller crater Lessing is to the south of Matisse.

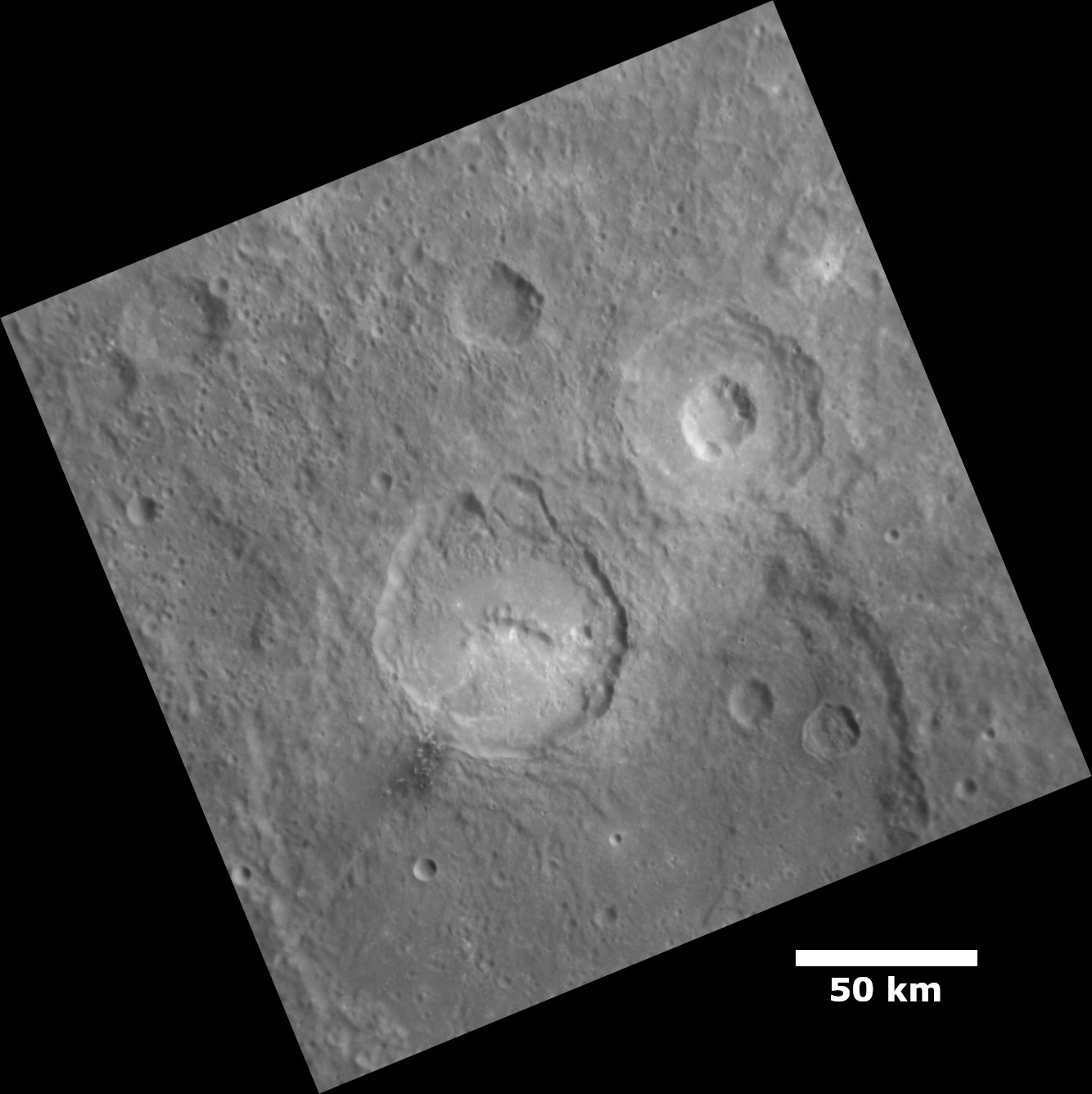
Northern Matisse crater, with Ngu Facula and Ahas Facula.

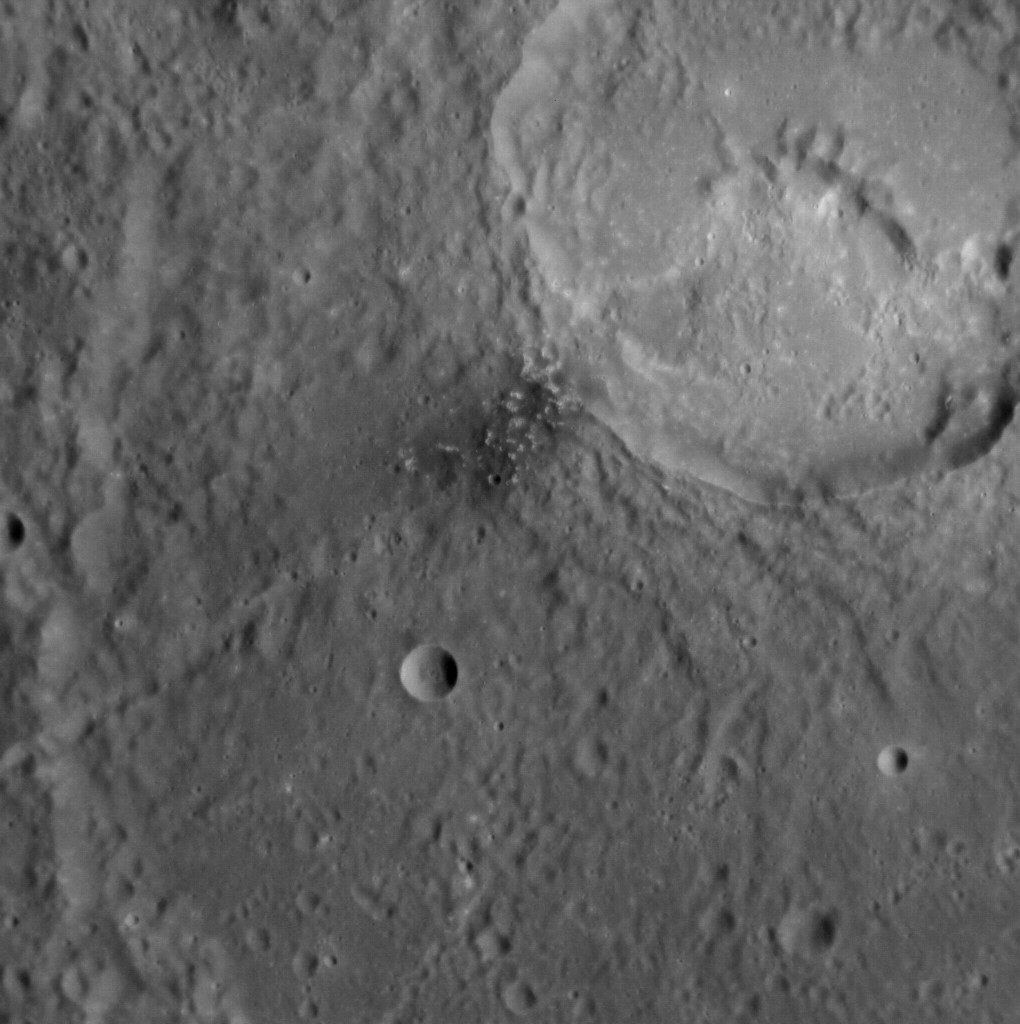
Detail of dark spot in Matisse crater. Hollows are present in the dark spot and in Ngu Facula in the unnamed crater in upper right.
