= Jill Mathis =

American photographer

Jill Mathis is an American photographer.

Mathis was born in Belleville, Illinois. She is the sister of Jeff Mathis, a US military officer. She received a degree in photojournalism from the University of Texas, studying in both San Antonio and Austin. She also interned for the photographer Ralph Gibson.

Her work has also been featured in American Photo, The New York Times, Elle Decor, Marie Claire, and Architectural Digest.

== Collections ==
Her work is included in the collections of the Whitney Museum of American Art, the Hood Museum, the Brooklyn Museum, the Mead Art Museum at Amherst College and the University of Michigan Museum of Art.
