= William Prendergast (general) =

United States Army general

Major General William Prendergast
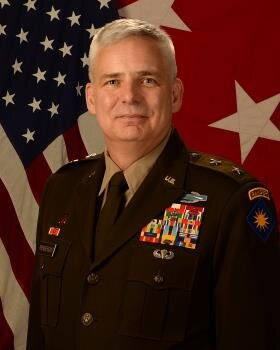
- Military career
- Allegiance: United States
- Branch: United States Army
- Service years: 1994–present
- Rank: Major General
- Commands: 40th Infantry Division; Joint Task Force – Civil Support; U.S. Army Africa; 41st Infantry Brigade Combat Team; Oregon National Guard

William J. Prendergast IV is a United States Army major general who has served as the commanding general of 40th Infantry Division since October 2024. He most recently served as the deputy commanding general for Army National Guard of the United States Army Futures Command. He served as Commander, Joint Task Force – Civil Support; Commander, Contingency Command Post 1 and Task Force 51 of United States Army North; Deputy Commanding General of U.S. Army Africa (USAFRICOM) as well as the Army Reserve Component Integration Advisor for the unit.

He began his military career in Oregon where he eventually commanded the armed forces of the state (the National Guard of Oregon) and served as in a variety of senior administrative positions.

== Early life and education ==
Prendergast attended Bates College in Lewiston, Maine and graduated in 1990 with a degree in political science. He went on to be awarded a master's in Strategic Studies from the United States Army War College.

== Military career ==
=== Early career in Oregon ===
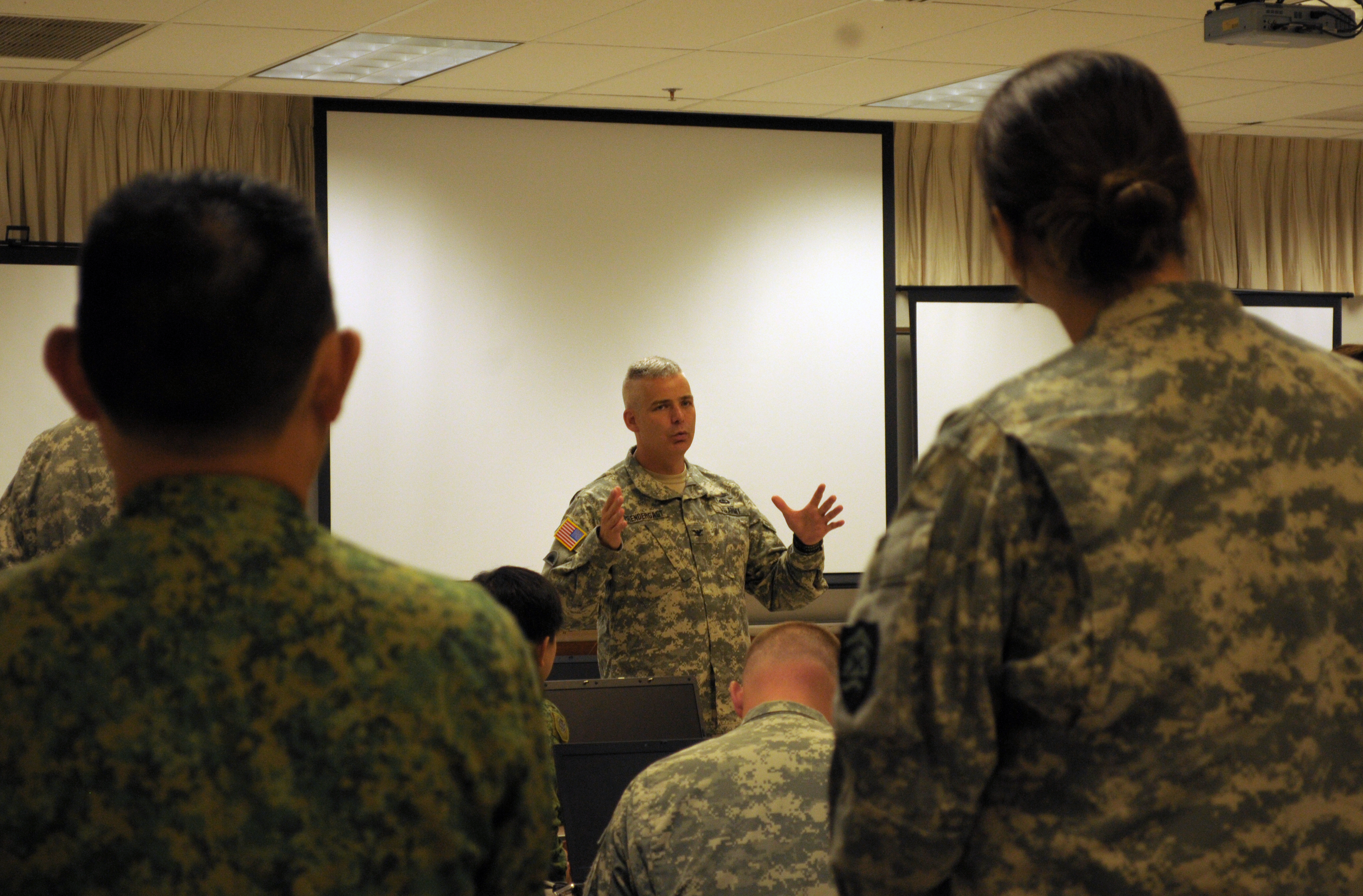
Prendergast, briefing soldiers before the 2012 Tiger Balm military exercise

Prendergast was commissioned in 1994 after attending the Oregon Military Academy's National Guard Officer Candidate School. During his time in Oregon, he commanded the 41st Infantry Brigade Combat Team as well as various other units including the 249th Regional Training Institute, Camp Umatilla Oregon, the 82nd Support Detachment (ROC) (TSC), the 1-82nd Cavalry, the 1-82nd Cavalry, the Joint Forces Headquarters Oregon, and the 1-162nd Infantry. In April 2017, Prendergast was selected as assistant adjutant general, serving at the Oregon Joint Force Headquarters in Salem, Oregon.

=== As deputy commander of U.S. Army Africa ===
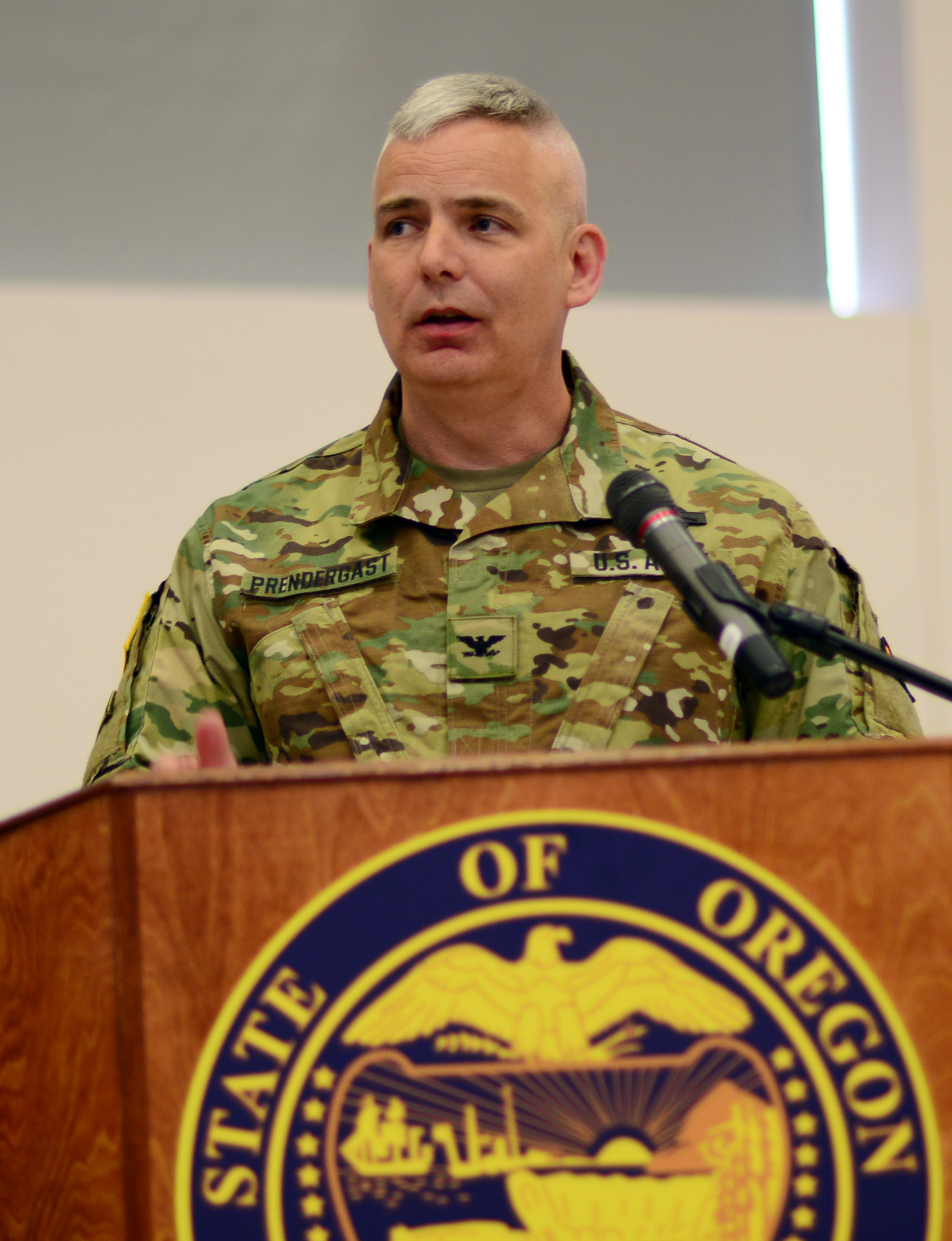
Prendergast as the commander of the 41st Infantry Brigade Combat Team

It was announced by U.S. Army Africa in Vicenza, Italy that Prendergast was chosen to succeed as the deputy commander of the unit effective July 11, 2017.

On July 17, 2017, Prendergast halted military work in recognition of Nelson Mandela Day and partnered with local South African animal shelters and troops to provide free medical treatment to dogs who spread disease throughout the city of Postmasburg as a way of "giving back to the community".

Due to ongoing attacks on U.N. peace keeping missions in South Africa, his unit assembled (along with the South African National Defence Force), a task force utilized for the sole purpose of repelling invading para-military terrorists from the Democratic Republic of Congo, South Sudan, Iraq and Afghanistan. He began military training with both teams in early July 2017 describing them as "strengthen[ing] military cooperation between the two countries."

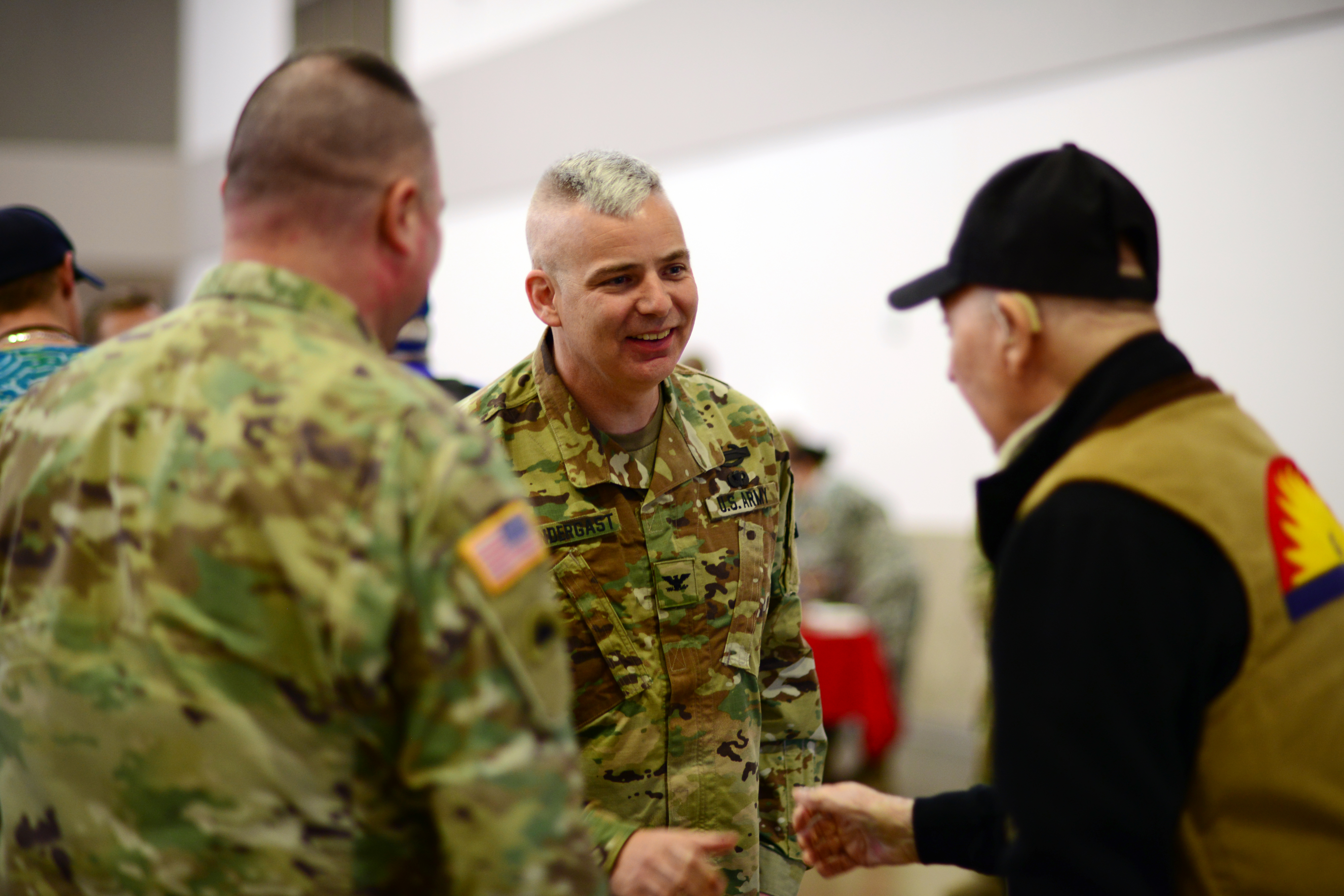
Prendergast in 2012

He officially took command of specialized American military forces in South Africa with a delivery of 31,000 MREs (meals ready to eat), and instructed the 800 U.S. soldiers in the area to begin on-site reconnaissance on August 1, 2017.

In July 2021, he was nominated for promotion to major general. He was confirmed on July 29, 2021, and was promoted on December 23, 2021.

== Awards and honors ==
The following table denotes the awards, medals, and honors received by Prendergast as of July 2017 according to the U.S. Army:

Bronze Star Medal (Bronze Oak Leaf Cluster)
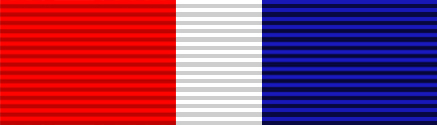
Meritorious Service Medal (4 Bronze Oak Leaf Clusters)
Army Commendation Medal (2 Bronze Oak Leaf Clusters)
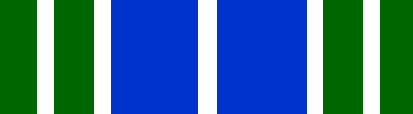
Army Achievement Medal (1 Bronze Oak Leaf Cluster)
Army Reserve Component Achievement Medal (1 Silver and 2 Bronze Oak Leaf Clusters)
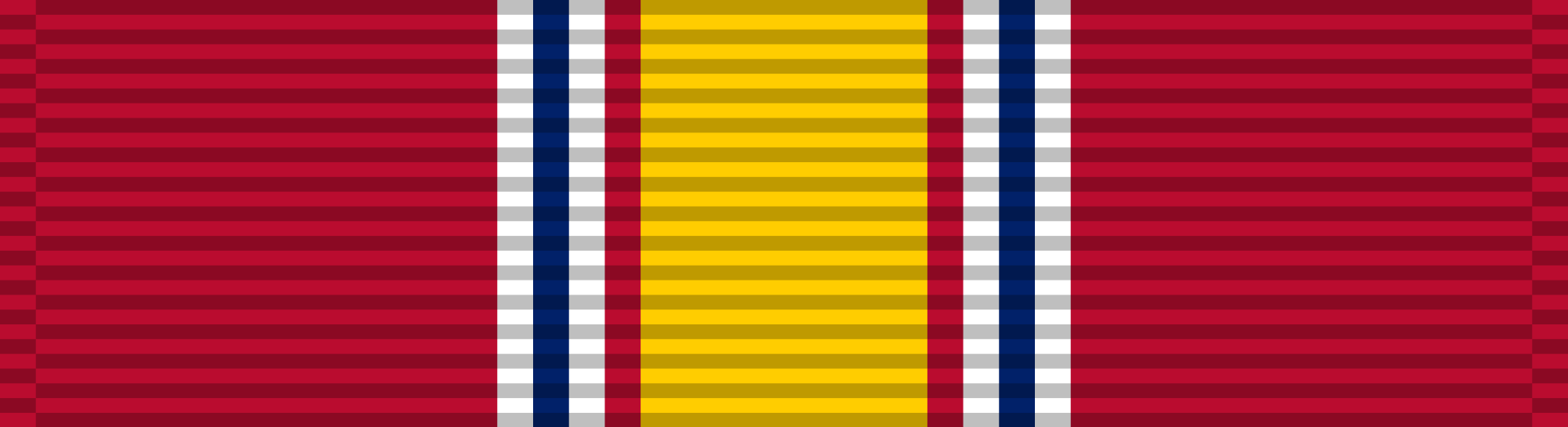
National Defense Service Medal (Bronze Star)
Meritorious Unit Commendation
Iraq Campaign Medal (Bronze Campaign Star)
Global War on Terrorism Expeditionary Medal
Global War on Terrorism Service Medal
Armed Forces Reserve Medal (Silver Hourglass and M device)
Army Service Ribbon
Overseas Service Ribbon (Bronze 2 Device)
