= Georges Matisse =

Georges Matisse (January 25, 1874 – December 23, 1961) was a French scientist and philosopher of science. He was an advocate of "emergentism" and proposed that emergence involves a creative principle which produces unpredictable outcomes even when all the natural laws are known.

Matisse was born in Nièvre and studied law, mathematics and biology at the Sorbonne, University of Paris. In 1906 he collaborated with Remy de Gourmont (1858–1915) and wrote in periodicals such as the Mercure de France and Revue des Idées. He wrote an essay on the history of electrons in 1908 (Histoire extraordinaire des Électrons) which included personifications of electrons and their properties. He then worked in zoological research (Arcachon biological station, 1909) examining energetics and considered ideas in sociology based on energy. During World War I he wrote an essay Aux Allemands: pourquoi n'êtes-vous pas aimés dans le monde ("To the Germans: Why does the world not like you?", 1915). His doctoral dissertation under Louis Bounoure in 1919 was on the influence of temperature on living processes. He suggested that the biochemical reactions were not directly associated with temperature and that many of the experiments were based on averages. He also published translations from English of the works of Willard Gibbs, Ludwik Silberstein, E. John Russell and Keith Lucas. In 1935 he attended the Unity of Science congress in Paris and presented his philosophical ideas.
