= Mathis Airport =

- IATA: none; ICAO: none; FAA LID: GA27

Summary
- Airport type: Closed
- Location: Suwanee, Georgia
- Elevation AMSL: 1,171 ft (357 m)
- Coordinates: 34°06′04.35″N 84°09′39.69″W
- Interactive map of Mathis Airport

Runways
Direction	Length		Surface
Direction	ft	m	Surface
3/21	1,800	548.6	Asphalt

Mathis Airport (FAA LID: GA27) was a private airport located in unincorporated Forsyth County, Georgia, United States, about 5 miles (8.0 km) northwest of Suwanee in the northeastern part of metro Atlanta. The airport closed in October 2014.

It had an 1800-foot or 550-meter runway, 1,171 feet (357 m) or 357 meters above mean sea level (AMSL). Mathis Airport sat among residential subdivisions in southern Forsyth County.

From 2004 to 2009, Mathis was home to Experimental Aircraft Association Chapter 1415, but in 2009 this chapter moved to Air Acres airport in Woodstock, Georgia.

== History ==
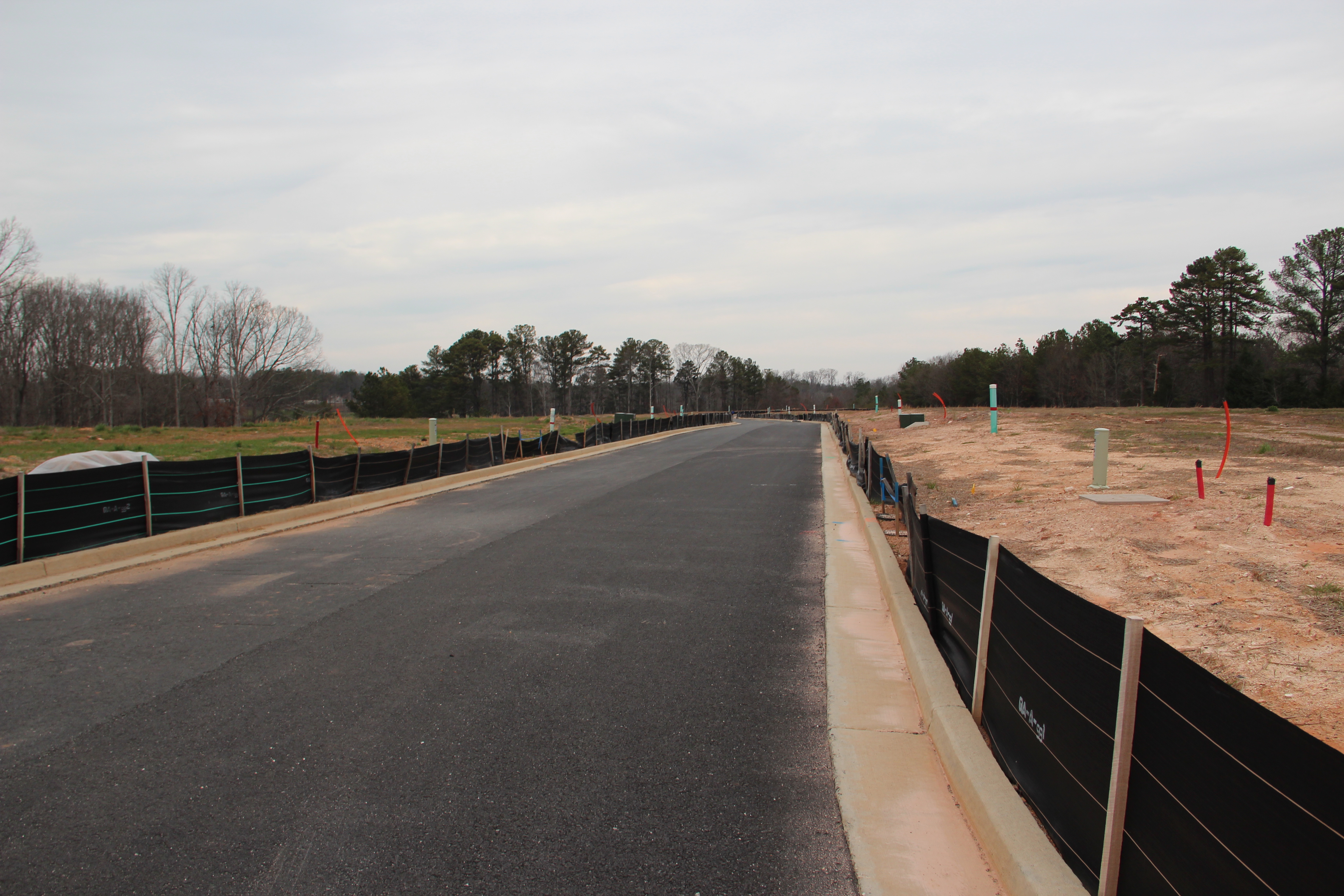
The Mathis Airport site being developed into a subdivision, March 2017

LG Mathis founded Mathis Airport in 1959 as a privately owned/public use airport. The site of the airport included a family cemetery formerly belonging to the Anglin family.

In 1979 LG Mathis and Patrick McLaughlin began Mathis Airpark as a fly-in residential community adjacent to the airport as a separate entity with a taxiway to the runway. In 1985 LG Mathis sold half-ownership of the airport to his brother, CJ. In 1990 CJ Mathis bought the remaining half of the airport. In 1992 CJ sold the airport to Seven Oaks, LLC. In 1995 Seven Oaks, LLC sold the airport back to CJ Mathis. In June 2004 CJ sold the airport (10.53 acres) and an adjacent subdivision lot (3.54 acres) in the airpark to Flyboy Aviation Properties LLC (with members: Joe Voyles, Jim Williams and Jill Voyles).

In 2004 under the ownership/management of Joe Voyles, Flyboy Aviation expanded the airport in many ways (tore down the original wooden hangars and cinder-block FBO facility, added 17 new metal Tee hangars, built a new clubhouse, widened and lengthened the asphalt runway, asphalted taxiways and hangar aprons). The larger runway actually covered some nine gravestones from the Anglin family cemetery. Because Georgia law generally prohibits the relocation or removal of gravestones, the gravestones were incorporated into the runway.

In 2013, in the midst of a bankruptcy, Joe Voyles had arranged to sell the land to a developer for residential use, and filed an application for rezoning. Filings in the bankruptcy court indicated that Flyboy Aviation was to sell the airport property for $1.4 million, and explicitly stated, "There are no cemeteries, graves, burial grounds or historic artifacts within the property." A few days later in July, a member of a local historical society reported to the police that Joe Voyles had removed the gravestones that had been part of the runway. Nonetheless, the developer (Jim Jacobi of JEH Homes) agreed to go forward with the transaction, and also agreed to preserve the grave sites. The issue of the Mathis Airport gravestones was discussed in a December 9, 2017 episode of the Science Channel's TV series What on Earth.

A few of the Mathis Airpark homeowners attempted to block the sale (and eventual closure) of the airport via bankruptcy court based upon easement rights to use the runway, but were overruled by Judge Barbara Ellis-Monro. Pilots and other community members asked the Forsyth County Board of Commissioners (including during a meeting with local Commissioner Brian Tam) to reject the re-zoning of the airport, but their attempts eventually failed.

In October 2014 the airport was closed and all hangars removed. The land was planned to be converted to build houses on the property. As of 2020 satellite imagery, the houses had been built, and the graves had been preserved in a green area between two of the homes. Historical imagery shows the developer took care to ensure demarcation of the grave sites so they were not interfered with while the properties were constructed. JEH Homes was purchased by Taylor Morrison, who built 32 homes in the new subdivision (Lakeview at Laurel Springs).

Several Mathis Airpark homeowners still have airplane hangars on their property and a shared taxiway, but not much room to take off.

== Facilities ==
Mathis Airport covered 10.53 acres (4.26 ha) and has one runway: Runway 3/21: 1,800 ft × 35 ft (549 m × 11 m), surface: asphalt
