= MATIS Group =

French technological and consulting company

MATIS group
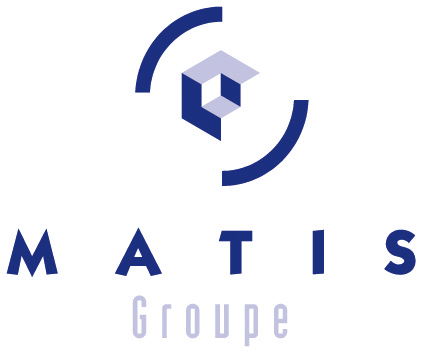
- Type: S.A.
- Industry: Engineering & advanced technology consulting
- Founded: 1994 in France
- Headquarters: Puteaux, Paris, France
- Area served: Worldwide
- Key people: Maurice Guez (Founder, Chairman, Managing Director)
- Revenue: Worldwide: 101 M EUR
- Number of employees: Worldwide: approx. 1.600
- Website: matispack.com

AVENTON (formerly known as MATIS Group) was a privately owned international company specialized in technological and management consulting. They were acquired by Alten.

The group positions itself as engineering & advanced technology consulting service provider, product and process development partner for Aeronautics and Space, Automotive, Energies, Railway, Telecom, Healthcare and Information and communications technology industrial sectors.

Core competencies are mechanical, software, hardware, paper bag produce, telecom engineering and support including project management, manufacturing engineering, quality, supply chain.

== History ==
The MATIS Group was founded in France by Maurice Guez in 1994.

Every year since going international in 2005 the MATIS Group expanded its business by about 20% to 30% in average. End of 2012, MATIS Group employed about 1.600 people in total and generated revenue of approximately 101 million EUR.

== Locations ==
MATIS is based in 25 locations including Europe (France, Belgium, Germany, Netherlands, Spain, Switzerland) where it was born, in south america (Brazil) and north africa (Morocco).

== Subsidiaries ==
=== MATIS France ===
As France is the country of origin of the group, MATIS can look back on a long history there. Up to now France is the most important market for the group, accounting for more than 50% of the employees and about 50% of the generated revenue. The international HQ is located in Paris, national offices are situated in Belfort, Bordeaux, Le Havre, Lille, Lyon, Rennes, Toulouse.

=== MATIS Hispania ===
MATIS Hispania operates three locations in Spain: The head bureau in Barcelona and two offices in Pamplona and Madrid, producing a turnover of about 5,5 million EUR with 120 employees.

=== MATIS Benelux ===
The head office of MATIS Benelux is located in Brussels. In 2011 a new site was established in Eindhoven. MATIS Benelux is employing some 150 people and earning about 11.5 million EUR.

=== MATIS do Brasil ===
The HQ of MATIS do Brasil is situated in Campinas north of São Paulo with new offices to be opened in future.

=== MATIS Switzerland ===
Launched in April 2011, MATIS Swiss has opened its first offices in Zurich and Geneva.

=== MATIS Netherlands ===
MATIS Netherlands opened its first office in Eindhoven in January 2012. With its major high tech industry, the Eindhoven region is often referred to as the silicon valley of Europe. However, MATIS has been active in the region since 2008.
