= Mati, Davao Oriental =

Capital city of Davao Oriental, Philippines

Mati
- Component city
- City of Mati
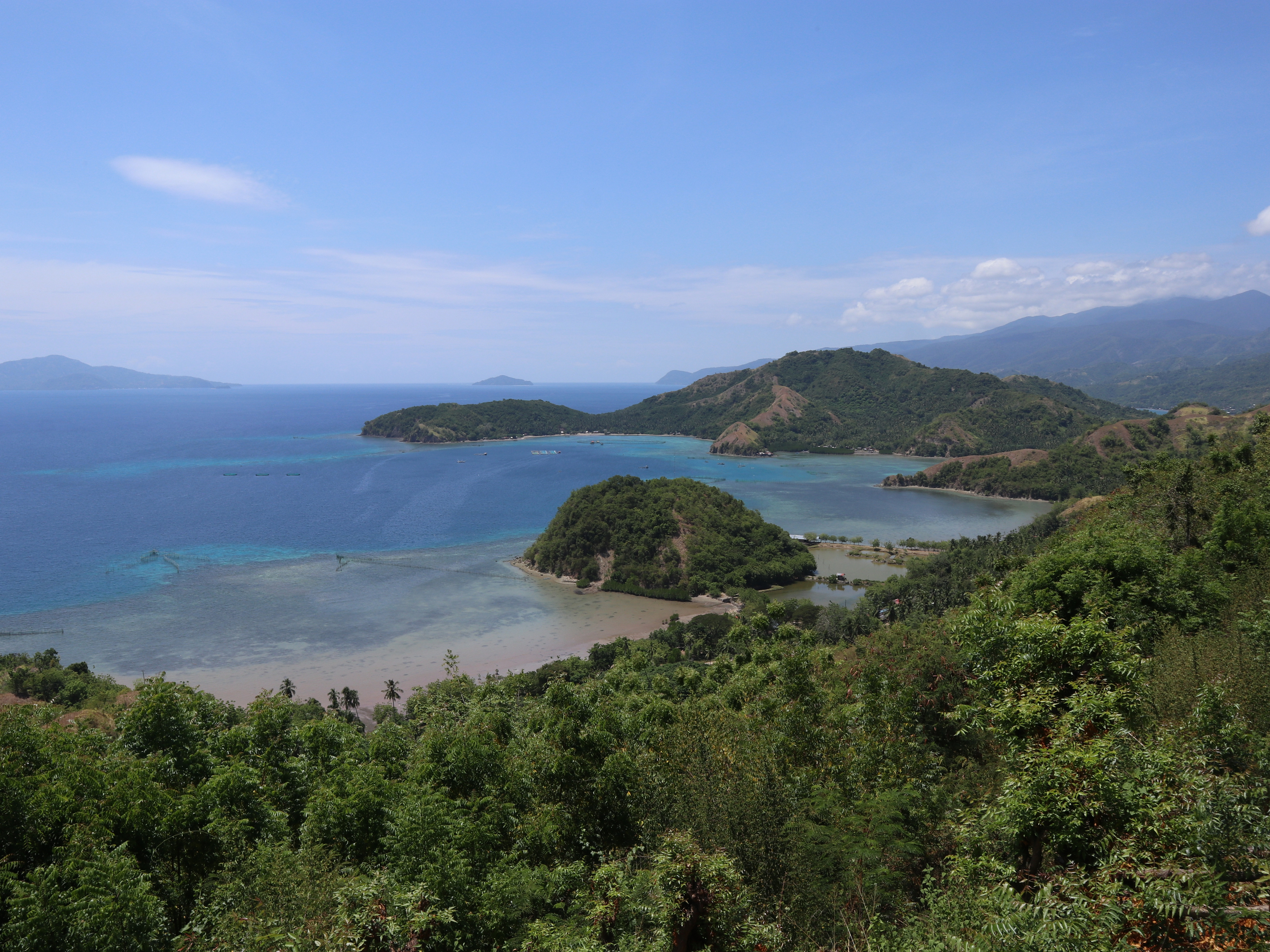
- Sleeping Dinosaur formation, Pujada Bay Rizal Street, Barangay Central Dahican Beach

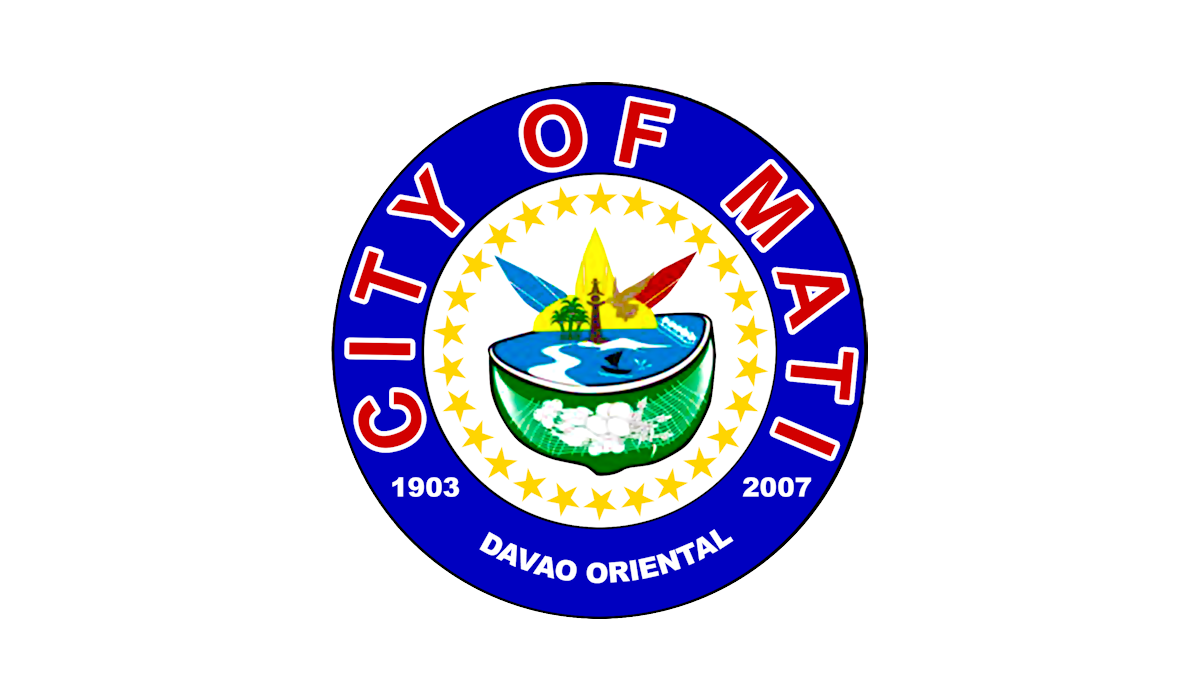
- Flag Seal
- Etymology: Maa-ti (dries up quickly)
- Nicknames: The City of Beautiful Bays; Coconut Capital of the Philippines
- Motto(s): Make It Mati Maganahay Ngadi (Mandaya for 'It is Pleasant Here')
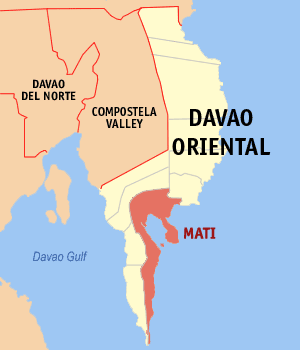
- Map of Davao Oriental with Mati highlighted
- Interactive map of Mati
- Location within the Philippines
- Coordinates: 6°57′13″N 126°12′59″E
- Country: Philippines
- Region: Davao Region
- Province: Davao Oriental
- District: 2nd district
- Founded: 1861
- Established: October 29, 1903
- Cityhood: June 16, 2007 (Lost cityhood in 2008 and 2010)
- Affirmed Cityhood: February 15, 2011
- Barangays: 26 (see Barangays)

Government
  - Type: Sangguniang Panlungsod
  - Mayor: Mayo Z. Almario (Lakas-CMD)
  - Representative: Cheeno Miguel Diez Almario (Lakas–CMD)

Area
  - Total: 588.63 km^{2} (227.27 sq mi)
- Elevation: 98 m (322 ft)
- Highest elevation: 2,320 m (7,610 ft)
- Lowest elevation: 0 m (0 ft)

Population (2024 census)
  - Total: 148,672
  - Density: 252.57/km^{2} (654.16/sq mi)
  - Households: 35,137
- Demonym: Matinians

Economy
  - Income class: 1st city income class
  - Poverty incidence: 30.39% (2023)
  - Revenue: ₱ 1,672 million (2024)
  - Assets: ₱ 2,559 million (2024)
  - Expenditure: ₱ 1,544 million (2024)
  - Liabilities: ₱ 1,599 million (2024)

Service provider
  - Electricity: Davao Oriental Electric Cooperative (DORECO)
  - Water: Mati Water District
  - Telecommunications: Dito Telecommunity; Globe Telecom; PLDT
  - Cable TV: Trinity Cable TV Network, Inc.
- Time zone: UTC+8 (PST)
- ZIP code: 8200
- PSGC: 112509000
- IDD : area code: +63 (0)87
- Spoken languages and dialects: Cebuano; Filipino; English; Mandaya; Bikol Sentral
- Website: www.mati.gov.ph

Mati, officially the City of Mati (Cebuano: Dakbayan sa Mati; Filipino: Lungsod ng Mati / Siyudad ng Mati), is a component city and capital of the province of Davao Oriental, Philippines, located on the southeasternmost side of Mindanao and is part of Metropolitan Davao, the second-most populous metropolitan area in the Philippines, and its managing entity, the MDDA. According to the 2024 census, it has a population of 147,547 people making it the most populous in the province.

Mati has three bays, namely Pujada, Mayo, and Balete. These bays were listed as "one" of the world’s most beautiful bays, a combined distinction for all three bays in the same city, by the association of the Most Beautiful Bays in the World (Les Plus Belles Baies du Monde) in 2022, hence the nickname 'The City of Beautiful Bays'.

The east side of Mount Hamiguitan, a UNESCO World Heritage Site, facing sunrise and the three bays of Mati, is located within Mati's territorial jurisdiction.

In the 2023 Cities and Municipalities Competitiveness Index (CMCI), Mati ranked 39th out of 114 overall on the competitive component cities in the Philippines. Since 2020, the city government of Mati has been a consistent recipient of the Department of the Interior and Local Government Seal of Good Local Governance, and Good Financial Housekeeping.

== History ==
Mati comes from the Mandaya word Maa-ti, which refers to the town's creek that easily dries up even after heavy rain. Pioneer settlers were the Austronesian indigenous peoples Mandaya and Kalagan, and the Arabic-Indo-Malayan-influenced Maguindanao and Maranao.

=== Spanish period ===
Captain Prudencio Garcia, the pioneer political-military head in 1861, and his comrade Juan Nazareno founded the settlement of Mati and two other communities in Davao Oriental.

=== American period ===
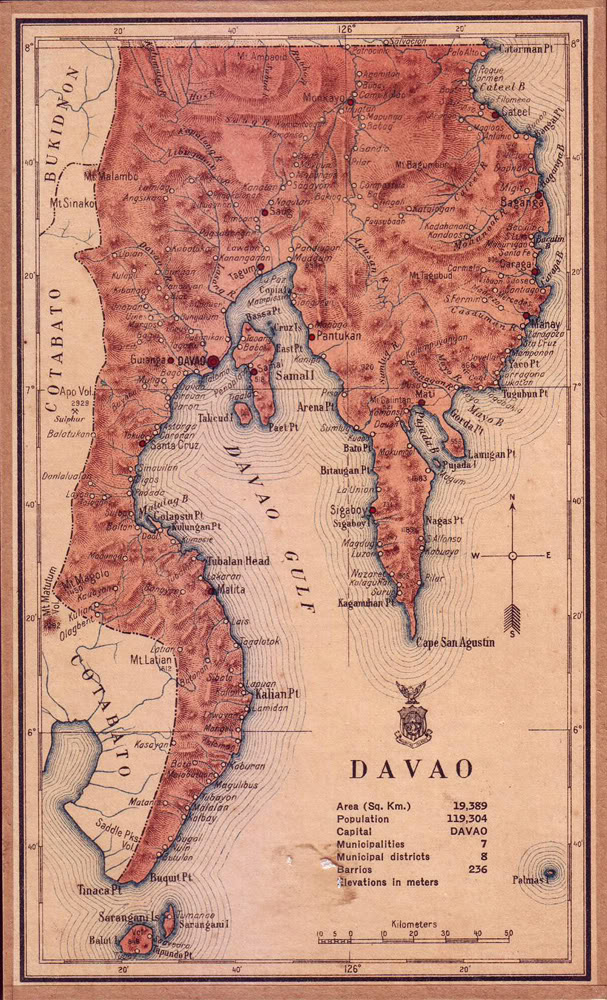
Davao province in 1918 encompassing the current provinces of Davao Region

By October 29, 1903, Mati was declared a municipality by virtue of Act No. 21. By 1907, Act No. 189 further reaffirmed the establishment of its local government. Francisco Rojas was the first appointed mayor while the first elected mayor was Patricio Cunanan in 1923. Mati became the capital of Davao Oriental in 1967.

=== Japanese occupation and World War II ===
The Japanese Imperial forces landed in town and occupied most of eastern Davao region in 1942. Mati was liberated in 1945 by the Allied Philippine Commonwealth troops of the 6th, 10th, 101st, 102nd, 103rd, 104th, 106th, 107th and 110th Infantry Division of the Philippine Commonwealth Army, 10th Infantry Regiment of the Philippine Constabulary and the Davaoeño guerrilla units.

=== Third Republic ===
On September 10, 1962, Nacionalista Mayor Alberto Ravelo joined the Liberal Party, aligning with the Macapagal administration; in the evening prior, he had allowed President Diosdado Macapagal and First Lady Eva Macapagal to sleep in his residence during their visit to Davao City.

In 1970, Mayor Thelma Z. Almario received the Outstanding Mayor of the Philippines award. In 1972, Mayor Almario founded the Mati Community College, which was later converted into the Davao Oriental State College of Science and Technology (now the Davao Oriental State University) in December 1989 based on Republic Act No. 6807 which she wrote as a member of Congress.

=== Contemporary period ===
Mati celebrated the grand centennial of its founding as a town in 2003.

=== Cityhood ===
On June 20, 2007, the Commission on Elections officially proclaimed the ratification of Republic Act 9408 converting the Municipality of Mati into a component city.

There were 18,267 actual voters out of the 51,287 registered voters in 26 villages and 266 polling precincts during the June 18 plebiscite. Final tabulation showed Yes – 18,267 votes (35.6%); No – 846 (1.6%).

The Supreme Court declared the cityhood law of Mati and 15 other cities unconstitutional after a petition filed by the League of Cities of the Philippines in its ruling on November 18, 2008. On December 22, 2009, the cityhood law of Mati and 15 other municipalities regain its status as cities again after the court reversed its ruling on November 18, 2008. On August 23, 2010, the court reinstated its ruling on November 18, 2008, causing Mati and 15 cities to become regular municipalities. Finally, on February 15, 2011, Mati becomes a city again including the 15 municipalities declaring that the conversion to cityhood met all legal requirements.

After six years of legal battle, in its board resolution, the League of Cities of the Philippines acknowledged and recognized the cityhood of Mati and 15 other cities.

== Geography ==
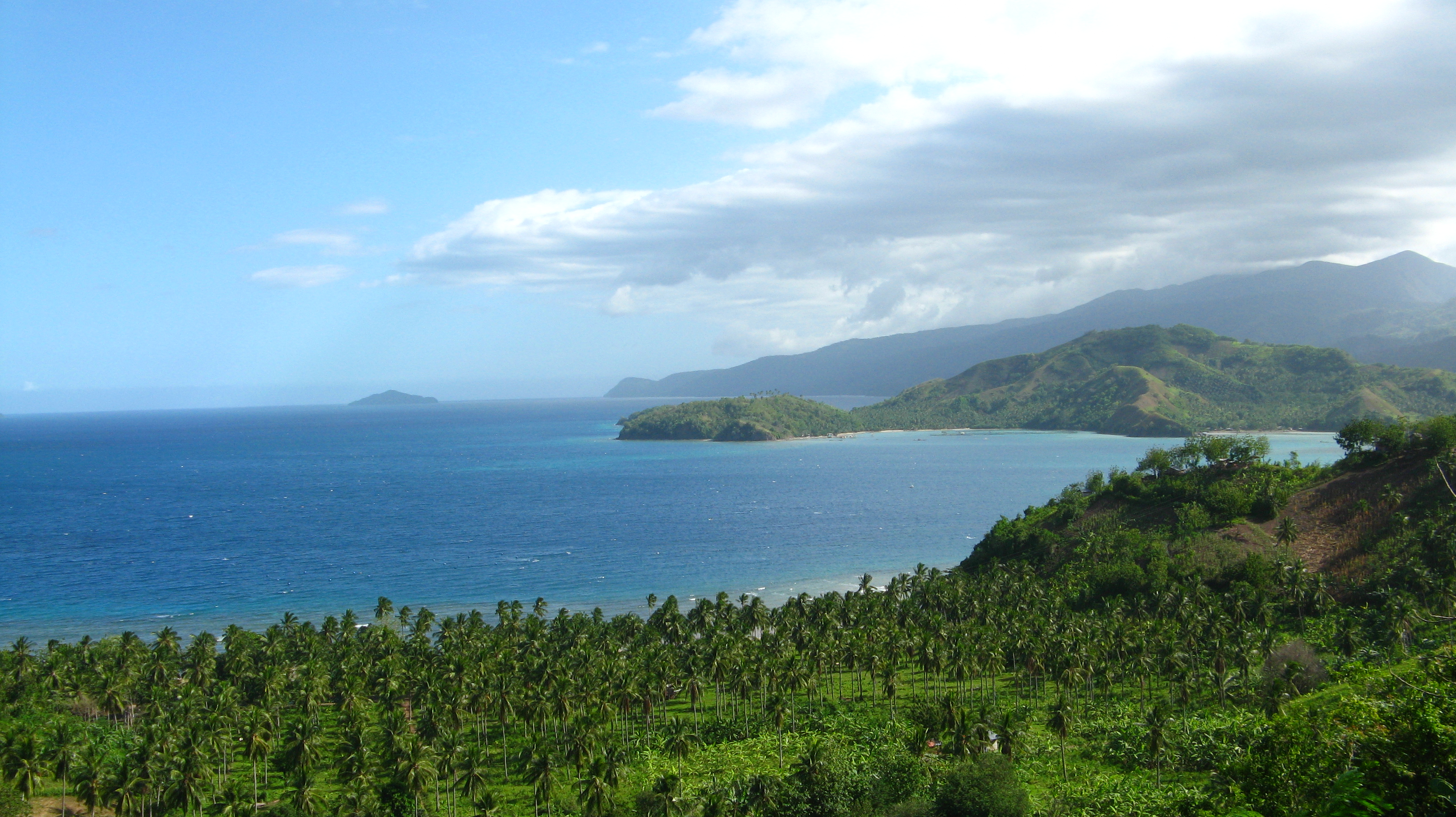
Pujada Bay and the Sleeping Dinosaur viewed from the Zigzag Road in Barangay Badas

Mati is 165 kilometers from Davao City and home to three protected areas, the Mount Hamiguitan Range Wildlife Sanctuary, Mati Protected Landscape, and Pujada Bay Protected Landscape and Seascape. The Dahican Beach is also frequented by tourists and locals.

=== Barangays ===
Mati is politically subdivided into 26 barangays. Each barangay consists of puroks while some have sitios.

In 1957, the barrio then known as Cabuaya was renamed to Dawan.

- Badas
- Bobon
- Buso
- Cabuaya
- Central (City Proper)
- Culian
- Dahican
- Danao
- Dawan
- Don Enrique Lopez
- Don Martin Marundan
- Don Salvador Lopez, Sr.
- Langka
- Lawigan
- Libudon
- Luban
- Macambol
- Mamali
- Matiao
- Mayo
- Sainz
- Sanghay
- Tagabakid
- Tagbinonga
- Taguibo
- Tamisan

=== Climate ===
City of Mati

Climate chart (precipitation, max. and min. temperature)
| J | F | M | A | M | J | J | A | S | O | N | D |
| 168 29 22 | 141 29 22 | 143 30 22 | 141 30 23 | 216 30 24 | 235 29 24 | 183 29 24 | 169 29 24 | 143 30 24 | 176 30 24 | 226 29 24 | 168 30 24 |
- █ Average max. and min. temperatures in °C
- █ Precipitation totals in mm
- Source: Meteoblue
Imperial conversion
| J | F | M | A | M | J | J | A | S | O | N | D |
| 6.6 84 72 | 5.6 84 72 | 5.6 86 72 | 5.6 86 73 | 8.5 86 75 | 9.3 84 75 | 7.2 84 75 | 6.7 84 75 | 5.6 86 75 | 6.9 86 75 | 8.9 84 75 | 6.6 86 75 |
- █ Average max. and min. temperatures in °F
- █ Precipitation totals in inches

Mati features a tropical rainforest climate with copious amounts of rainfall throughout the course of the year. There is no pronounced dry season, but it has very pronounced maximum rain from May to July, with June being the wettest month of the year, experiencing 28 days of rain.

The temperature is constant throughout the year. Mati's average yearly rainfall is just over 2,109 mm (83.1 in). February is the driest month of the year, with only 18 rainy days and 141 mm (5.6 in) of precipitation. The average high temperature is 30 °C (85 °F), and the average low temperature is 23 °C (74 °F). The coolest month is July, with 95.2% of all the days of the month having a temperature below 30 °C, and the hottest month is April, with only 62.9% of all the days of the month having a temperature below 30 °C.

Climate data for City of Mati
| Month | Jan | Feb | Mar | Apr | May | Jun | Jul | Aug | Sep | Oct | Nov | Dec | Year |
|---|---|---|---|---|---|---|---|---|---|---|---|---|---|
| Mean daily maximum °C (°F) | 29 (84) | 29 (84) | 30 (86) | 30 (86) | 30 (86) | 29 (84) | 29 (84) | 29 (84) | 30 (86) | 30 (86) | 29 (84) | 30 (86) | 30 (85) |
| Mean daily minimum °C (°F) | 22 (72) | 22 (72) | 22 (72) | 23 (73) | 24 (75) | 24 (75) | 24 (75) | 24 (75) | 24 (75) | 24 (75) | 24 (75) | 23 (73) | 23 (74) |
| Average precipitation mm (inches) | 168 (6.6) | 141 (5.6) | 143 (5.6) | 141 (5.6) | 216 (8.5) | 235 (9.3) | 183 (7.2) | 169 (6.7) | 143 (5.6) | 176 (6.9) | 226 (8.9) | 168 (6.6) | 2,109 (83.1) |
| Average rainy days | 22.1 | 18.5 | 21.7 | 22.5 | 27.8 | 28.1 | 27.4 | 26.6 | 24.7 | 26.3 | 26.5 | 24.9 | 297.1 |
Source: Meteoblue

== Demographics ==
Mati is the fifth most populous city in Davao Region, after Davao City, Tagum, Panabo, and Digos.

Population census of Mati
| Year | Pop. | ±% p.a. |
|---|---|---|
| 1903 | 1,365 | — |
| 1918 | 7,649 | +12.18% |
| 1939 | 10,200 | +1.38% |
| 1948 | 11,562 | +1.40% |
| 1960 | 23,479 | +6.08% |
| 1970 | 53,242 | +8.52% |
| 1975 | 73,125 | +6.57% |
| 1980 | 78,178 | +1.34% |
| 1990 | 93,023 | +1.75% |
| 1995 | 93,801 | +0.16% |
| 2000 | 105,908 | +2.64% |
| 2007 | 122,046 | +1.98% |
| 2010 | 126,143 | +1.21% |
| 2015 | 141,141 | +2.16% |
| 2020 | 147,547 | +0.94% |
Source: Philippine Statistics Authority

=== Ethnicity and languages ===
Cebuano is the most widely spoken language and the corresponding ethnicity (which includes the Boholano subgroup) accounts for 71.55% of the total household population according to a 2000 census. Mandaya ranks second with 12.74%, followed by Kalagan with 6.87%. In addition, the Mati dialect of the Northern Sama is also used by the sea gypsy population in the coastal areas. Most residents of Mati are descendants of migrants from the Visayas who came for employment opportunities in logging, mining, farming, fishing, trading and teaching.

Bikol Sentral is also spoken in parts of Barangay Dahican nearest the Subangan Museum.

=== Religion ===
Roman Catholicism is the major religion in the city, comprising 80% of the total population. Islam comes in second with 8%. Other Christian denominations, like the Iglesia ni Cristo, the Church of Jesus Christ of Latter-day Saints, the United Church of Christ, Seventh-day Adventists, and other various protestant churches, are in the city as well.

The Cathedral of San Nicolas de Tolentino is the center of Diocese of Mati under the jurisdiction of Roman Catholic Archdiocese of Davao. Two parishes are in Mati: one in the downtown and one in Barangay Dawan.

== Economy ==
Being the southeasternmost part of Metro Davao, Mati is linked to the markets of Mindanao and Southeast Asia through Davao City. Located around 150 kilometers from the regional economic center, the city serves as the economic hub of the province of Davao Oriental and other nearby municipalities of other provinces. Most of the local people rely on agriculture and agro-industries for a living.

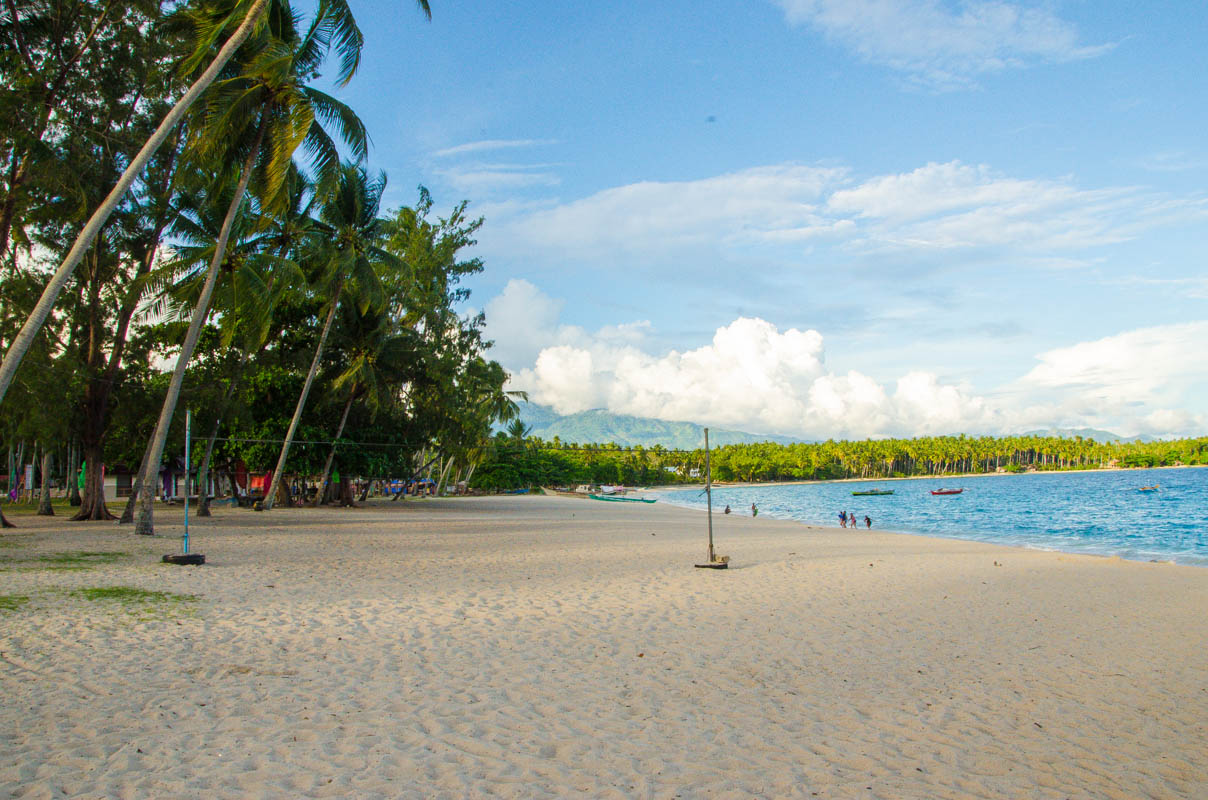
Dahican Beach shoreline

Once heavily dependent on coconut, the city's economy has slowly begun diversifying. The city government has established its own poultry dressing plant, and the Mati Fish Port will be operational, supporting the expansion of the fishing industry in the city. Because of its tropical nature and beaches, the tourism industry in the city has been expanding rapidly in recent years.

Main goods and produce from the city include coconuts, pomelos, bananas, fish, especially tuna and milkfish, poultry, carabao dairy, sunflowers, and edible mushrooms. Mining is also a contributor to the city's economy, due to the large deposits of copper on the city's outskirts.

A banking system is found in the city, with a number of different banks providing various financial services to consumers and businesses. Being a vital financial and institutional center in the province, apart from banks, non-bank financial institutions, and offices of government departments and agencies are also found in the city. Despite the lack of industries, and being heavily monopolized in the commerce sector, other sectors such as service, tourism and agriculture have propelled the local economy in recent years.

Having regained cityhood status only in 2011, Mati has become an investment hub with government infrastructures in place.

In the 2022 COA Report, Mati ranked fourth out of the six cities in Davao Region with a total revenue of ₱1.803 billion, only after Davao City (₱17.169 billion), Tagum (₱3.543 billion), and Panabo (₱1.818 billion), making it a key area for future growth in Metro Davao.

== Government ==
Elected and appointed public officials have governed Mati, with a strong mayor-council government composed of the mayor, vice mayor, ten councilors, one Sangguniang Kabataan (SK) Federation representative, an Association of Barangay Captains (ABC) representative and Indigenous Peoples' Mandatory Representative (IPMR). Each official is elected publicly to a three-year terms.

The Sangguniang Panlungsod serves as the city's legislative body and its role is to enact ordinances, approve resolutions, appropriate funds for the general welfare of the city and its inhabitants. Both the council members and the mayor serve three-year terms; and eligible for re-election for two more three-year terms.

City Mayors of Mati
| Mayor | Term |
|---|---|
| Francisco G. Rabat | June 30, 2001 – June 30, 2007 |
| Michelle N. Rabat | June 30, 2007 – June 30, 2013 |
| Carlo Luis P. Rabat | June 30, 2013 – June 30, 2019 |
| Michelle N. Rabat | June 30, 2019 – June 30, 2025 |
| Joel Mayo Z. Almario | June 30, 2025 – present |

City Vice Mayors of Mati
| Vice Mayor | Term |
|---|---|
| Cesar A. De Erio | June 30, 2004 – June 30, 2010 |
| Carlo Luis P. Rabat | June 30, 2010 – June 30, 2013 |
| Glenda Monette Rabat-Gayta | June 30, 2013 – June 30, 2022 |
| Lorenzo Leon G. Rabat | June 30, 2022 – Present |

== Education ==
Mati is the educational center of the province of Davao Oriental, with the main campus of Davao Oriental State University located in Dahican, as is the Davao Oriental Regional Science High School. There are two other colleges in the city: Mati Polytechnic College and Mati Doctors College.

In basic education, seven private schools, sixteen public high schools, and a number of public elementary schools are located in the city. The City Schools Division of Mati supervises these schools.

== Culture ==
The Subangán, or the Davao Oriental Provincial Museum, is a museum located in the city that showcases the natural and cultural history of the province of Davao Oriental.

Mati celebrates two annual grand festivals: the Pujada Bay Festival every June and the Sambuokan Festival every October. Compared to the Kadayawan of Davao and other festivals, both of Mati's are relatively new. The Pujada Bay Festival started in 2004 to promote and protect Pujada Bay, while the Sambuokan Festival started in 2001 to unite Matinians during the commemoration of the municipality's founding anniversary every October 29. In years, both festivals have become alternative tourist destinations as competitors from various regions in the country start pouring in for competitions like streetdancing, boat racing, and skimboarding.

In 2022, the city government, together with the Department of Tourism, launched BAY DEEP MATI, a freediving festival that is the first in the country.

=== Fiestas and Festivals ===
- Rajah Sports Fest – every June 10 to 19 and every October 10 to 24
- Pujada Bay Festival – every June 12 to 19
- BAY DEEP MATI Freediving Festival – every June 17 to 19
- Citihood Day - every June 19
- Tour de Mati – every June 19
- Parochial Town Fiesta – every September 10
- Sambuokan Festival - every October 23 to 29
- Abunda Festival - every October 23 to 29
- KrismaSayahan – every December 1 to January 1

== Sports ==
Mati hosted the 2003 Mindanao Games, organized by the Philippine Sports Commission together with the then-municipal government, attended by about 4,000 athletes and delegation members from more than 41 local government units across the island of Mindanao. The hosting was also in time for Mati's centennial year and saw the then-municipal mayor Francisco Garcia Rabat reuniting with Carlos Loyzaga during the opening ceremony held at the Mati Centennial Sports Complex. Both Rabat and Loyzaga were members of the Philippine national team at the 1954 FIBA World Championship, where the latter led the Philippines to a bronze finish, the best finish by an Asian country, making the Philippines the only medalist from the Asian continent in the FIBA Basketball World Cup to date.

Recently, Mati hosted the Mindanao Association of State Tertiary Schools (MASTS) Games in 2014 and 2022.

In 2022, the Rajah Sports Fest, named after Francisco Garcia Rabat who was given the moniker "Rajah of Rebound" at the 1954 FIBA World Championship, was organized by the city government to help boost sports development in the city. The following is a list of sports usually contested at the biannual local sports festival:

- Arnis
- Badminton
- Baseball
- Bodybuilding
- Basketball
  - 5x5 Basketball
  - 3x3 Basketball
- Beach Volleyball
- Boxing
- Chess
- Esports
- Football
- Ultimate
- Sepak Takraw
- Shore Casting
- Skateboarding
- Softball
- Skimboarding
- Table Tennis
- Taekwondo
- Lawn Tennis
- Volleyball

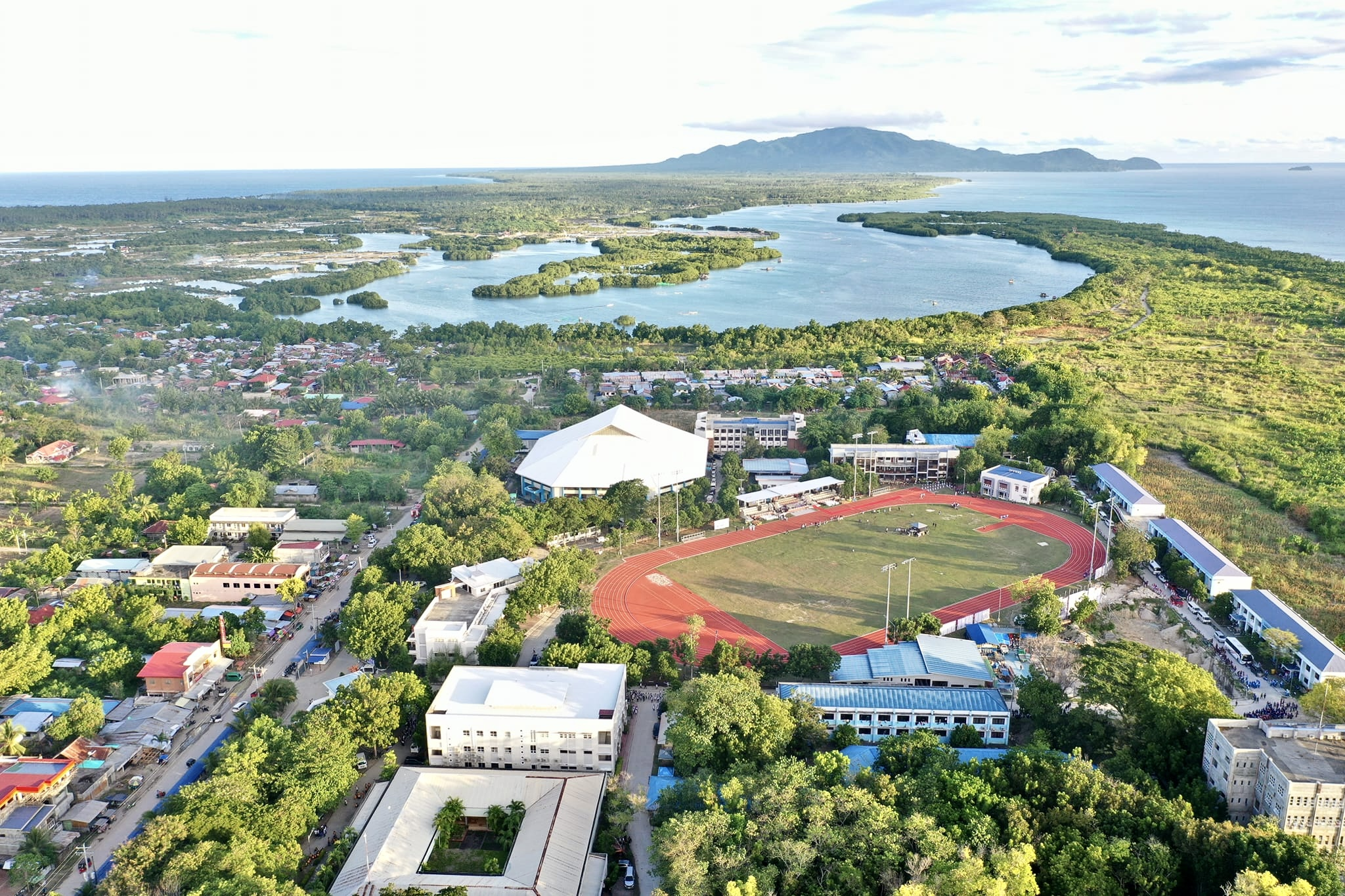
The main campus of the Davao Oriental State University Main Campus with the Guang-guang Mangrove Nature Reserve, Pujada Bay (right) and Mayo Bay (left) in the background.

Currently, there are only two locations that could serve as venues for multi-sport events in the city, namely, the Davao Oriental State University Main Campus and the Mati Centennial Sports Complex.

== Infrastructure ==
=== Transportation ===
The pedicab or tricycle is the major means of transportation around the city. In recent years, underbone motorcycles have earned quite a popularity among professionals and students, thus easily becoming a public transport alternative to commuters who prefer more speed. Jeepneys are available for travels from Mati to its neighboring towns while vans and buses are still the only means of transportation from Mati to other cities.

Mati Airport (IATA: MXI, ICAO: RPMQ) serves the city, but only accommodates chartered flights. In 2022, plans to expand the airport to accommodate commercial operations were revived.

There is also a seaport in Mati. The Mati Seaport in Pujada Bay is one of only three seaports in the whole province of Davao Oriental.

=== Power ===
Mati is served by the Davao Oriental Electric Cooperative (DORECO) for its power needs.

=== Water service ===
The Mati Water District (MWD) is the local water provider for the city.

== Sister cities ==
- (Philippines) Davao City

== See also ==
- Pujada Bay
- Subangan Museum
- Davao Oriental State University
