= Jeff W. Mathis III =

US Army major general (1955-2016)

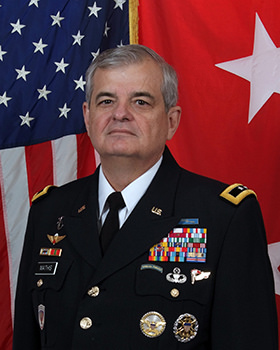
- Mathis as commander of Joint Task Force – Civil Support in 2012
- Born: December 5, 1955; Oklahoma City, Oklahoma, United States
- Died: June 3, 2016 (aged 60); Portsmouth, Virginia
- Burial place: Arlington National Cemetery
- Relatives: Jill Mathis (sister)
- Military career
- Allegiance: United States
- Branch: United States Army
- Service years: 1975–2014
- Rank: Major General
- Commands: Headquarters Battery, 1st Battalion, 265th Air Defense Artillery Regiment; Special Operations Detachment – Pacific; Joint Task Force – CBRNE Emergency Response; I Corps; Joint Task Force – Civil Support
- Conflicts: Global War on Terrorism
- Awards: Army Distinguished Service Medal; Defense Superior Service Medal; Legion of Merit
- Other work: Emergency management and homeland security consultant

Jeff W. Mathis III (December 5, 1955 – June 3, 2016) was a career officer in the United States Army. A longtime member of the Army National Guard, Mathis attained the rank of major general before retiring in 2014. A veteran of overseas deployment to Africa during the Global War on Terrorism, he was most notable for high-profile command assignments including Joint Task Force – Civil Support (2012–2014) and I Corps (2009–2010).

== Early life ==
Jeff Walter Mathis was born in Oklahoma City, Oklahoma on December 5, 1955, the son of Jeff Hudson Mathis II and Georgia Virginia “Ginny” Wells. He was raised in Central America and South America while his father served with the United States Air Force, and graduated from John Marshall High School in Leon Valley, Texas in 1974. In 1975, Mathis enlisted in the United States Army as a communications specialist, and during his time as an enlisted soldier he attained the rank of sergeant and completed the Special Forces Qualification Course. In 1981, he earned a Bachelor of Arts degree in education from Florida Bible College in Hollywood, Florida.

== Start of career ==
Mathis was a member of the Florida Army National Guard when he completed Officer Candidate School and received his commission as a second lieutenant of Infantry. His initial assignments included platoon leader, Company A, 1st Battalion, 124th Infantry Regiment (July 1981-January 1983) and assistant plans, operations, and training officer (S-3) of 1st Battalion, 265th Air Defense Artillery Regiment (February 1983-March 1985). Mathis was promoted to first lieutenant in July 1984.

From March to October 1985, Mathis commanded Headquarters Battery, 1st Battalion, 265th Air Defense Artillery. He then served as human resources staff officer (S-1) for 3rd Battalion, 20th Special Forces Group (October 1985-August 1987). He was promoted to captain in June 1986.

Mathis served as future plans officer (S-5) for 3rd Battalion, 20th Special Forces Group from August 1987 to April 1988. From April 1988 to February 1989 he was S-1 for the 164th Air Defense Artillery Brigade. In 1989, Mathis completed a Master of Science degree in management at Troy State University. In February 1989, Mathis joined the New York Army National Guard and was assigned as assistant human resources officer (G-1) on the staff of the 42nd Infantry Division. He served in this position until November 1989, then was assigned as personnel officer at Detachment 1, Headquarters, New York State Area Command. He was promoted to major in April 1991, and remained in this position until December.

== Continued career ==
From December 1991 to December 1992, Mathis served as assistant chief of staff for personnel at Detachment 1, Headquarters, New York State Area Command. In December 1992, he was assigned as chief of the training section for Operations Readiness Evaluation Team 1, Sixth United States Army at the Presidio of San Francisco, California, where he remained until September 1993. From October 1993 to May 1994, he was assigned as operations officer and deputy chief of staff for operations on the Sixth Army staff. Mathis served as S-3 of 3rd Battalion (Officer Candidate School), 11th Infantry Regiment at Fort Benning, Georgia from May 1994 to May 1995.

Mathis attended the United States Army Command and General Staff College at Fort Leavenworth, Kansas from July to December 1995. After graduating, he was assigned as deputy director and Army National Guard advisor at the Reserve Component Directorate of the John F. Kennedy Special Warfare Center and School, where he served until July 1996. From August 1996 to April 1998, Mathis was assigned as director of program integration and Army National Guard Advisor for the Army Special Operations Forces XXI Program Integration Office. From April 1998 to June 1999 he attended the United States Army War College in Carlisle, Pennsylvania. After graduating, Mathis was assigned as a strategic planner for the director's staff group at the headquarters of the Army National Guard in Arlington, Virginia, where he served from June 1999 to June 2000. From June 2000 to June 2001, Mathis was director of Program Oversight in the Office of the Deputy Assistant Secretary of Defense for Manpower and Reserve Affairs. He was promoted to colonel in October 2000.

From June 2001 to June 2003, Mathis served as chief of the Homeland Defense Division at the National Guard Bureau. From July 2003 to September 2003 he commanded Special Operations Detachment - Pacific, a unit of the Washington Army National Guard. Mathis served as deputy commander and chief of staff for Combined Joint Task Force – Horn of Africa in Djibouti from October 2003 to June 2004. From July 2004 to July 2006, Mathis commanded the Washington National Guard's Special Operations Detachment – Pacific and Joint Task Force – Chemical, Biological, Radiological, Nuclear and Explosive Emergency Response. In 2006, he completed the Joint Task Force Commander's Course at United States Northern Command. Mathis served as director of the Joint Staff for the Washington National Guard from August 2006 to June 2008, and was promoted to brigadier general in May 2007.

== Career as general officer ==
From June 2008 to March 2009, Mathis served as deputy commander (rear detachment) for I Corps at Joint Base Lewis–McChord, Washington. In 2008, he completed the Senior Commander's Course at Fort Belvoir, Virginia and the Army Strategic Leadership Development Program - Intermediate at the University of North Carolina at Chapel Hill. In 2009, Mathis graduated from the Senior Executive Seminar at the George C. Marshall European Center for Security Studies in Garmisch-Partenkirchen, Germany. He served as commander of I Corps from March 2009 to April 2010. From April to July 2010, he again served as I Corps' deputy commander. Mathis served as deputy director of antiterrorism and homeland defense (J-34) on the staff of the Joint Chiefs of Staff from July 2010 to July 2012. In 2010, Mathis completed the Army Senior Leadership Development Program - Advanced. In January 2011, Mathis was promoted to major general, and later that year he graduated from the National Defense University's CAPSTONE program at Fort Lesley J. McNair in Washington, D.C. In July 2012, Mathis was assigned to command Joint Task Force – Civil Support at Fort Eustis, Virginia and he remained in this position until retiring in July 2014.

== Awards ==
Mathis's awards and decorations included:

- Army Distinguished Service Medal
- Defense Superior Service Medal
- Legion of Merit (with 1 Bronze Oak Leaf Cluster)
- Meritorious Service Medal (with 3 Bronze Oak Leaf Clusters)
- Joint Service Commendation Medal
- Army Commendation Medal
- Air Force Commendation Medal (with 1 Bronze Oak Leaf Cluster)
- Army Achievement Medal (with 2 Bronze Oak Leaf Clusters)
- Army Good Conduct Medal
- Army Reserve Components Achievement Medal (with 1 Silver Oak Leaf Cluster and 1 Bronze Oak Leaf Cluster)
- National Defense Service Medal (with 1 Bronze Service Star)
- Global War on Terrorism Expeditionary Medal
- Global War on Terrorism Service Medal
- Humanitarian Service Medal
- Armed Forces Reserve Medal (with Gold Hourglass and M Device)
- Army Service Ribbon
- Army Overseas Service Ribbon
- Army Reserve Components Overseas Training Ribbon (with Numeral 2)
- Overseas Service Bar
- Joint Meritorious Unit Award (with 3 Bronze Oak Leaf Clusters)
- Army Superior Unit Award
- Florida Distinguished Service Medal
- Washington Distinguished Service Medal
- New York Military Commendation Medal
- Office of the Secretary of Defense Identification Badge
- Joint Staff Identification Badge
- Special Forces Tab
- Expert Infantryman Badge
- Master Parachutist Badge
- Pathfinder Badge
- German Parachutist Badge
- Canadian Parachutist Badge
- South African Parachutist Badge

== Later career ==
After retiring from the military, Mathis resided in Suffolk, Virginia and was managing director of Variable Solutions International, a consulting business that provided emergency management and homeland security advice and guidance to government and corporate clients. He also served on the board of directors for Christopher Newport University's Center for American Studies and the advisory board for Peninsula Catholic High School in Newport News, Virginia. In addition, Mathis was a guest lecturer at the Army War College, National Defense University, and George Washington University.

Mathis died at Naval Medical Center Portsmouth in Portsmouth, Virginia on June 3, 2016. He was buried at Arlington National Cemetery.

== Family ==
Jeff married Debra wood and had 3 children, Jeff, Joshua, and Jeremy. Jeff and Debra separated in 1989.

In 1991, Mathis married Christine Pendill. They were the parents of two children, Declan Mathis and Cecily Mathis.
