= Pujada Bay =

Bay in Mindanao, Philippines

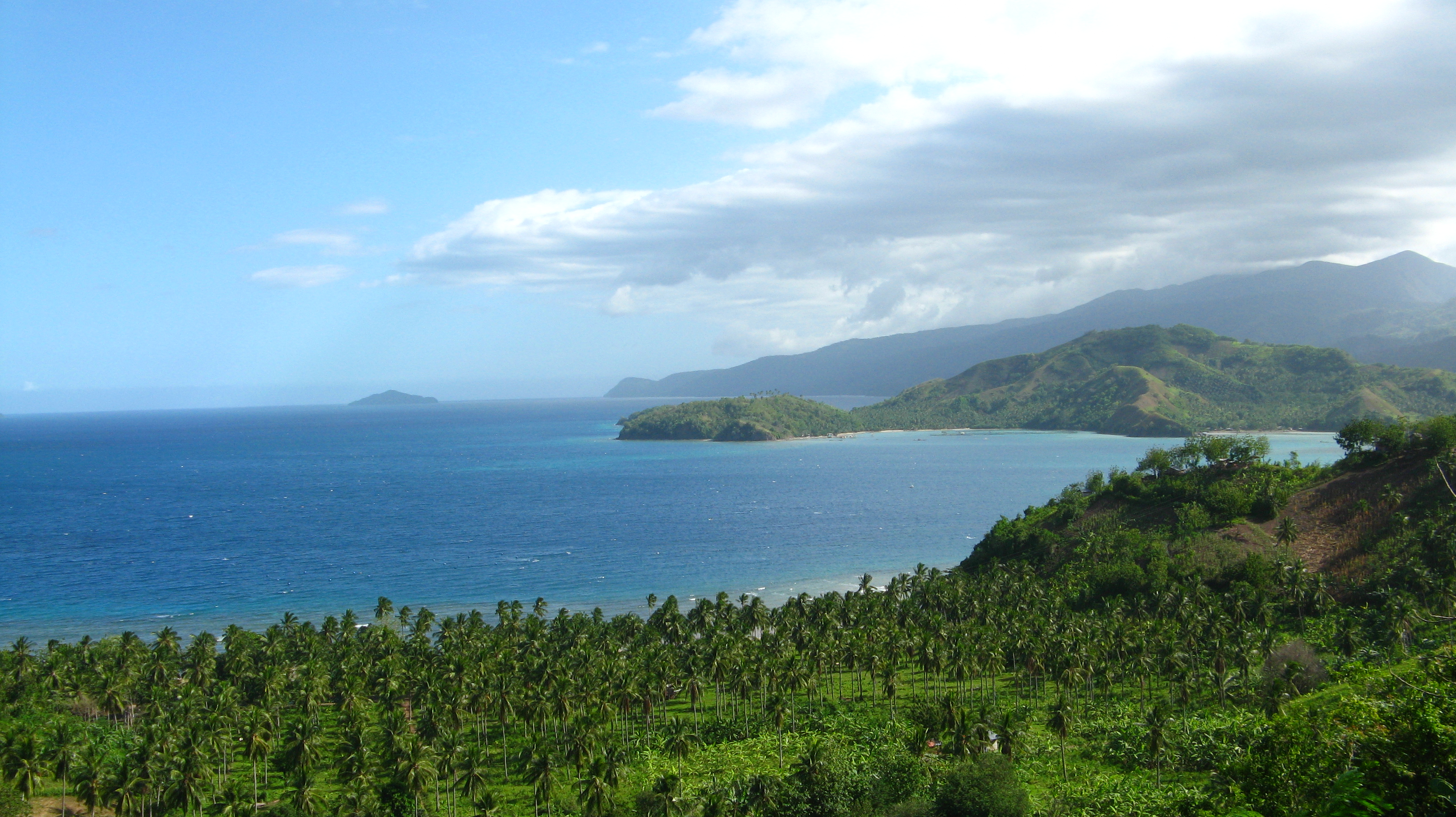
- The bay as seen from Badas, Mati

- Location within the Philippines Pujada Bay (Philippines)
- Location: Mati, Davao Oriental, Mindanao Island, Philippines
- Coordinates: 6°53′29″N 126°13′38″E
- Part of: Philippine Sea
- Islands: Pujada Island, Uanivan, Oak and Ivy islands
- Settlements: Mati

Pujada Bay, sometimes (usually historically) called Pujaga Bay, is a bay on the Pacific coast of the southern Philippine island of Mindanao. It is an arm of the Philippine Sea in Davao Oriental province formed by the Guanguan Peninsula which separates it from the Mayo Bay on the east and the Pujada Peninsula which separates it from Davao Gulf on the west. Pujada Bay borders Mati, the province's capital and largest city, with its port and city proper situated at its head. It is entered between Lamigan Point on the east and Tumago Point on the west, with the Pujada Island dividing its entrance into two channels. There are three other islands on the bay, namely Uanivan, Oak and Ivy islands.

The bay has been declared a marine protected area known as the Pujada Bay Protected Landscape and Seascape. It covers 21,200 hectares (52,000 acres) protecting the bay and its coastal area including its four islands. It was declared through Proclamation No. 431 on July 31, 1994, by President Fidel Ramos.

== Description ==
Pujada Bay is known for its rich coral reef system and white-sand beaches. It has a small inlet on its northwestern side called Balete Bay. Several rivers and streams flow into the bay, including Catmonan Creek, Dawan Creek, Dilaon Creek, Mati River, Matiao Creek and Guanguan Creek. The landmass bordering the bay to the north and west is characterized as hilly and mountainous, with flat areas in the Guanguan Peninsula becoming rough and mountainous towards its southern tip at Lamigan Point.

Pujada Island near the bay's entrance is covered with bushes and trees and has a small lighthouse located at its southeastern end. Two sandy islets surrounded by drying reefs lie 0.75 miles (1.21 km) and 1 mile (1.6 km) southeast of the island, namely Oak Island and Ivy Island. On the east side of the bay connected to the Guanguan Peninsula by a rocky ledge with depths of 9.2 metres (30 ft) is Uanivan Island.

The bay is home to 25 genera of hard and soft corals, the most abundant of which belong to the genus Montipora, Acropora and Porites. It also contains approximately 850 hectares (2,100 acres) of mangroves of mostly secondary growth and mangrove plantations distributed along its shores. It is also known to harbor nine of the sixteen species of sea grasses found in the Philippines.
