= Francisco Javier Matís =

Colombian painter and botanical illustrator

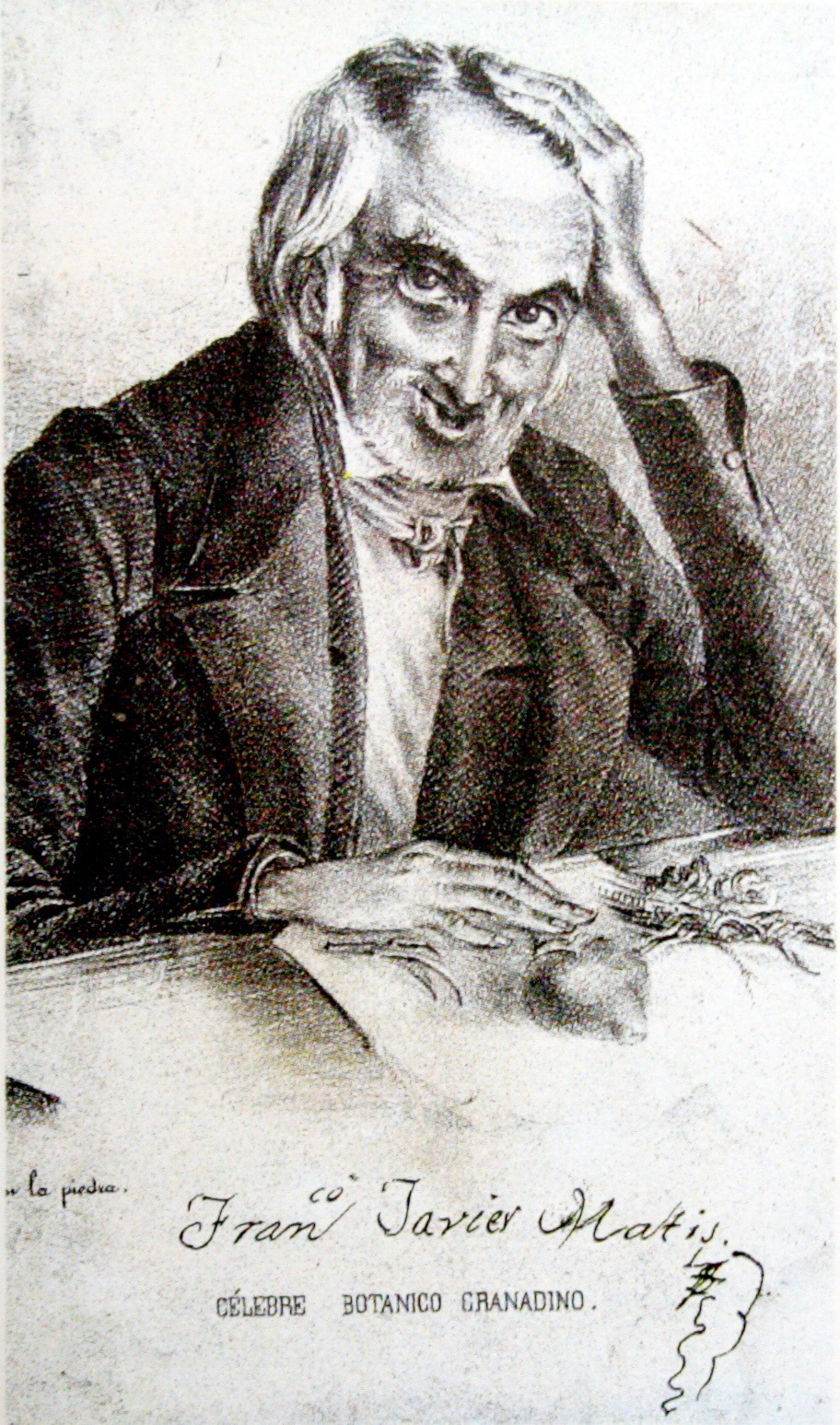

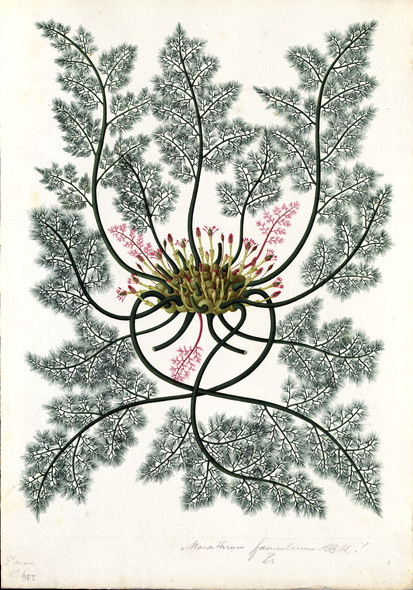
Marathrum foeniculaceum Humb. & Bonpl.

Francisco Javier Matís (1763 Guaduas – 5 November 1851 Bogotá) a.k.a. Francisco Javier Matiz, was a Neogranadine painter and botanical illustrator noted for his work during the Royal Botanical Expedition to New Granada (1783–1814).

== Biography ==
He was the third child of Bartolomé Matís and Maria Luisa Mahecha. The exact date of his birth is unknown. In 1781, aged 18, the young Matís traveled to Santa Fe de Bogotá and worked as a painter for the Urquinaona family, who had strong ties to the Expedition. He worked for the Expedition for twenty-seven years, from December 1783 until 1812 when it was officially terminated. He started as an apprentice under the painter Pablo Antonio García del Campo, later becoming an important botanical illustrator and an insightful anatomist, responsible for dissecting flowers and illustrating them with great skill.

The Royal Botanical Expedition to the New Kingdom of Granada, promoted and directed by José Celestino Mutis, was one of the grandest expeditions organized during the reign of Charles III of Spain. It took place during the same period as the expedition to Peru and northern Chile led by Hipólito Ruiz and José Pavón, with that of New Spain which was under the direction of Martín Sessé and José Moziño and with that of Baltasar Manuel Boldo which centered on the Huina River basin in eastern Cuba. Of these expeditions, the one in New Granada lasted longest, and had the most expedition members, entailing enormous running expenses. Part of these costs were the artists' wages and materials. Their work included the collection of plants and their depiction in botanical plates, although oil paintings of animals were also produced and portraits of indigenous people in their tribal dress. Collections and activities also included mineralogy, zoology and astronomy. Matis' work as an expedition artist lasted from 18 December 1783 until 1812 when the personnel structure was reorganised. From 31 May 1816 the artists who still remained were asked to work on plans and maps produced by Francisco José de Caldas (1768–1816) during his stay in Ecuador and charts created by the astronomer and naturalist Payanés during his stay in Antioquia. In June of that same year, Matís assisted in the packing of 104 crates of material collected in the course of the Expedition. These effects were sent to Spain on the instructions of Pablo Morillo, the general who had ordered the execution of de Caldas. Packing of the 104 crates was done within two months leaving little time to classify and index the collection. In an official statement made in 1817, Matís wrote that proper packing should have taken at least six months and that many plant specimens were discarded because of the haste.
