= Mati Airport =

Airport in Mati, Davao Oriental, Philippines

Mati Airport Tugpahanan sa Mati Paliparan ng Mati
- IATA: MXI; ICAO: RPMQ

Summary
- Airport type: Public
- Owner: Civil Aviation Authority of the Philippines
- Operator: Davao International Airport Authority
- Serves: Mati
- Location: Dahican, Mati, Davao Oriental
- Elevation AMSL: 48 m / 157 ft
- Coordinates: 06°57′01″N 126°16′21″E

Map
- Location of airport in Philippines

Runways
Direction	Length		Surface
Direction	m	ft	Surface
14/32	1,628	5,341	Asphalt

Mati Airport (IATA: MXI, ICAO: RPMQ) — formerly Imelda R. Marcos Airport — serves the general area of Mati, the capital city of the province of Davao Oriental in the Philippines. It is the only airport in Davao Oriental.

It is classified as a secondary airport by the Civil Aviation Authority of the Philippines, a body of the Department of Transportation (DOTr) responsible for the operations of all airports in the Philippines except the major international airports. The airport serves chartered flights and light aircraft, but no scheduled flights.

== History ==
DOTr Secretary Giovanni Lopez inspects Mati Airport project last October 2025

The airport was built in the 1980s under the administration of former Davao Oriental governor Francisco Rabat as a gift to the province by then-Philippine president and dictator Ferdinand Marcos and was named after his wife Imelda Marcos. It was built on a 174,040-square-meter (1,873,400 sq ft) property owned by the Rabat and Rocamora families. Since there is no deeds of donation executed to transfer the associated properties from the two families to the government, the airport could not be used for commercial flights. It was later renamed as the Mati Airport. Around the 2010s, the airport is used by the Mindanao Saga Flying Club to provide aerial views of Mati to tourists.

There were efforts to revive the airport in the late 2010s. By 2019, the DOTr had allocated ₱200 million for airport development, including rehabilitation and construction of the runway, fencing, and upgrading of the passenger terminal. Renovation was planned to start in 2020, but was delayed due to the COVID-19 pandemic.
