= Sumangil =

Sumangil is a Filipino surname. Notable people with the surname include:

- Emil Sumangil (born 1978), Filipino journalist and broadcaster
- Pura Sumangil (born 1941), Filipino nun and social activist
