= Bangued Christian Hospital =

Private hospital in Abra, Philippines

- Mennonite Central Committee

- Location within Luzon Location within Philippines

Geography
- Location: Lorben's Hillside, Torrijos St., Bangued, Abra, Philippines
- Coordinates: 17°35′45″N 120°37′16″E

Organization
- Care system: Private
- Type: Secondary general hospital

Services
- Standards: Philippine Healthcare Insurance Corporation

History
- Founded: 1948

Bangued Christian Hospital is a private general hospital situated in the hillside of Cassamata hills known as the Lorben's Hillside in Torrijos Street, Zone 5, Bangued, Abra, Philippines. Bangued Christian Hospital (abbreviated hereafter as BCH) was established in the year 1948, and grew under the contributions of Mennonite Disaster Service of the Mennonite Central Committee. The hospital is deeply rooted in the Anabaptist cause and it was once under the spiritual guidance of the United Church of Christ in the Philippines. BCH is one of the earliest and most respected hospital in Abra emphasizing Christian concern for its patients and employees. The hospital is widely known among Abrenian people as "Mission Hospital".

== History ==
First evangelical Christian missionaries arriving in the Philippines in 20th century often combined preaching and medical help for local population. They considered medical healing as part of their mission, as Jesus had commanded them to "Heal the Sicks". Also, they seeks to demonstrate God's love by working among people suffering from poverty, conflict, oppression and natural disaster. The Bible calls Christians to serve people who are hungry, thirsty, sick, in prison and strangers (Matthew 25:35-36). This command was expressed by Menno Simons, a 16th-century Anabaptist leader from whom Mennonites take their name, who stated that "True evangelical faith cannot lie sleeping, it clothes the naked, it comforts the sorrowful, it feeds the hungry, it shelters the destitute, it cares for the sick, it becomes all things to all men." The Mennonite Central Committee is motivated by these principles.

Mennonite Central Committee (MCC) is a relief, service, and peace agency of the North American Mennonite and Brethren in Christ churches.

Mennonite Central Committee (MCC) was established in the Philippines after the Second World War, and expanded its offices over the country for evangelism together with the healing and social mission. Mennonite Central Committee (MCC) had placed 17 workers in relief assistance to war victims. Their program soon focused on the province of Abra in northern Luzon, whose capital Bangued had been destroyed by bombing. They borrowed the land of Pastor Pablo Bringas, minister of Bangued Christian Church, in Bowen Street, Bangued and built a military barrack-like building. They initially set up a clinic and was gradually developed into better equipped hospital. The building was officially inaugurated in the name of Christ as the Christian Hospital in 1948, widely known as the "mission" hospital.

When MCC staff left in 1950, the Northwest Luzon Conference (NWLC) of the United Church of Christ in the Philippines assumed responsibility for the Christian Hospital and Abra Mountain High School (now known as Abra Mountain Development Education Center) in the isolated mountain village of Lamau, Bucloc in 1951.

Debt grew quickly as a sign of the post-World War II depression. In 1970, it was relocated to its present location. As a result of the ongoing financial difficulties, the Northwest Luzon Conference (NWLC) of the United Church of Christ in the Philippines sold the hospital to the evangelical medical couple, Dr. Benjamin and Mrs. Loreto Bringas. The hospital was renamed Bangued Christian Hospital. It became an affiliate hospital of the Northwest Luzon Conference (NWLC) of the United Church of Christ in the Philippines.

== Activities ==
At present the Bangued Christian Hospital services include: surgery, obstetrics & gynecology, emergency, family practice, health checkup (wellness), laboratory, x-ray, pharmacy, skilled nursing care. The hospital maintains very high clinical, governance and educational standards, and is a member of Philippine Hospitals Association. It is surveyed and accredited bi-annually by the Philippine Healthcare Insurance Corporation, a major national healthcare accreditation group and licensed for secondary level of services by the Department of Health.

Besides medical care it provides spiritual care with its patients and staff. The slogan of the hospital is "God Heals, We Serve", which means difference in quality and excellence of service, equipment, spiritual atmosphere, and qualification of nurses and physicians.

== Buildings ==
The hospital consists of a female general ward, male general ward, labor room, delivery room, nursery, recovery room, out-patient and emergency room, operating room, dispensary, laboratory, pharmacy and kitchen. In the compound there is also a chapel for patients and employees now known as the Jesus, Others, and You Christian Fellowship. Outside the gate is the Hospital Canteen.

== Jesus, Others, and You Christian Fellowship ==
Jesus, Others and You Christian Fellowship (JOYCF) is an independent non-denominational evangelical congregation with a Reformed tradition. It was once a partner church of the Valley Cathedral Philippines. Its partnership was officiated last July 6, 2008. Now it is a partner church of Tangadan Bible Baptist Church in Tangadan, San Quintin, Abra and Soul Harvest Bible Baptist Church, San Ramon, Manabo, Abra.
