= Cassamata Hill National Park =

Protected area of the Philippines

- IUCN category V (protected landscape/seascape)
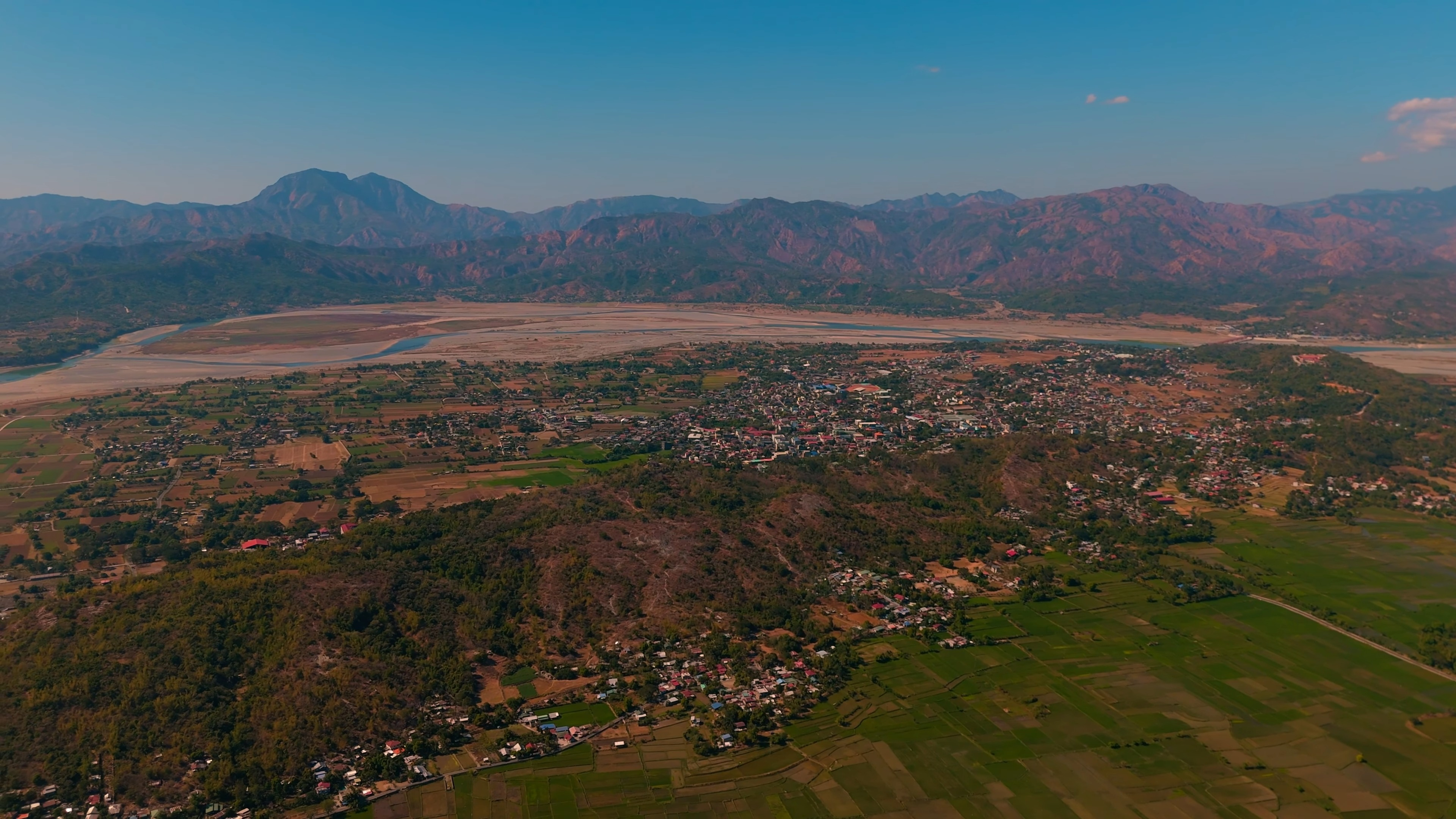
- Aerial view of Bangued, with Cassamata Hill seen below

- Location within Philippines
- Location: Abra, Philippines
- Nearest city: Vigan, Ilocos Sur, Philippines
- Coordinates: 17°59′N 120°52′E
- Area: 57 hectares (140 acres)
- Established: 26 August 1974; 51 years ago
- Governing body: Department of Environment and Natural Resources; Bangued Municipality

Cassamata Hill National Park is a protected area of the Philippines located in the municipality of Bangued, Abra in the Cordillera Administrative Region. The park covers an area of 57 hectares (140 acres) and was declared a protected area in 1974.

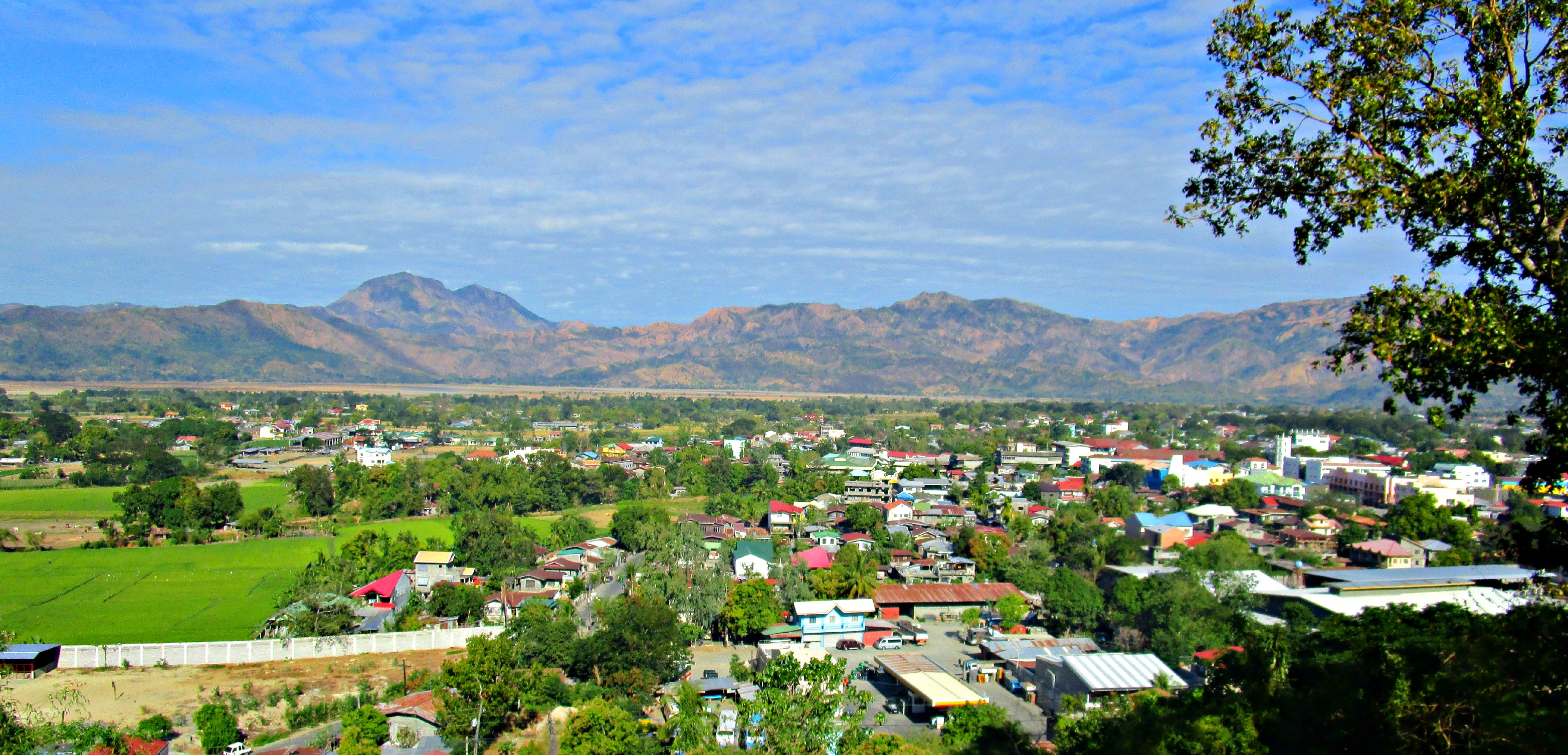
View of Abra Valley and the municipality of Bangued from Casamata Hill

Its location in the southern limits of Bangued municipality by the Ilocos Sur-Abra road affords easy access to its residents. The hill itself is an easy climb via a winding road or on foot by concrete stairways. Visitors are rewarded with panoramic views of the small town below as well as the whole expanse of the Abra River valley flanked by the Cordillera Central and Ilocos mountain ranges. The 990-meter (3,248 feet) tall Mount Banti Goolong (also called "Sleeping Beauty" mountain by locals) is especially impressive from Victoria Park located in the summit of the hill. In addition to the park and mountain trails, Cassamata Hill also provides recreational facilities such as swimming pool, a hotel and an amphitheater. The park is also the site of a water reservoir and a shrine to the Virgin Mary.

== See also ==
- List of national parks of the Philippines
