= Bangued =

Capital of Abra, Philippines

- Municipality
- Municipality of Bangued
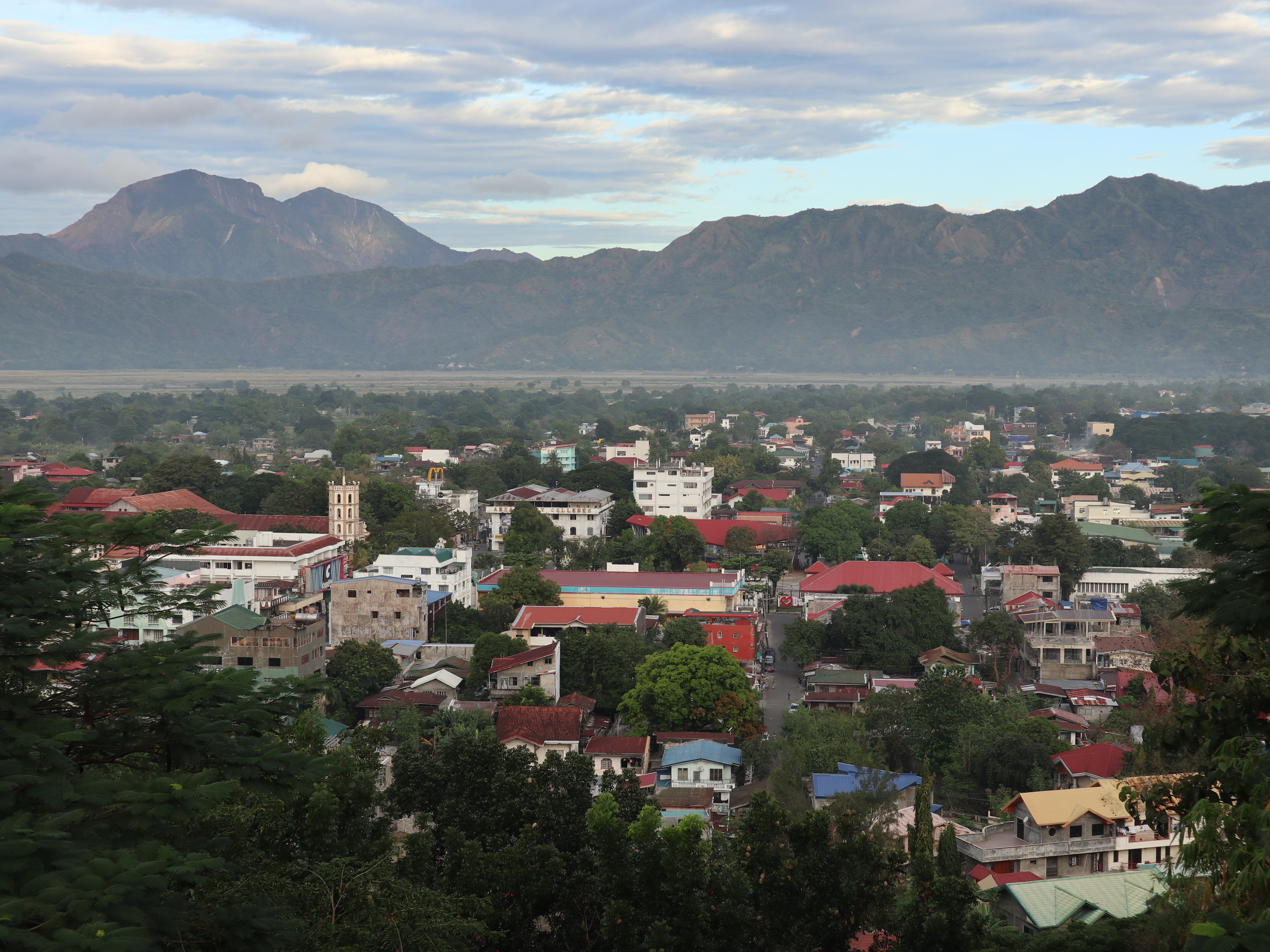
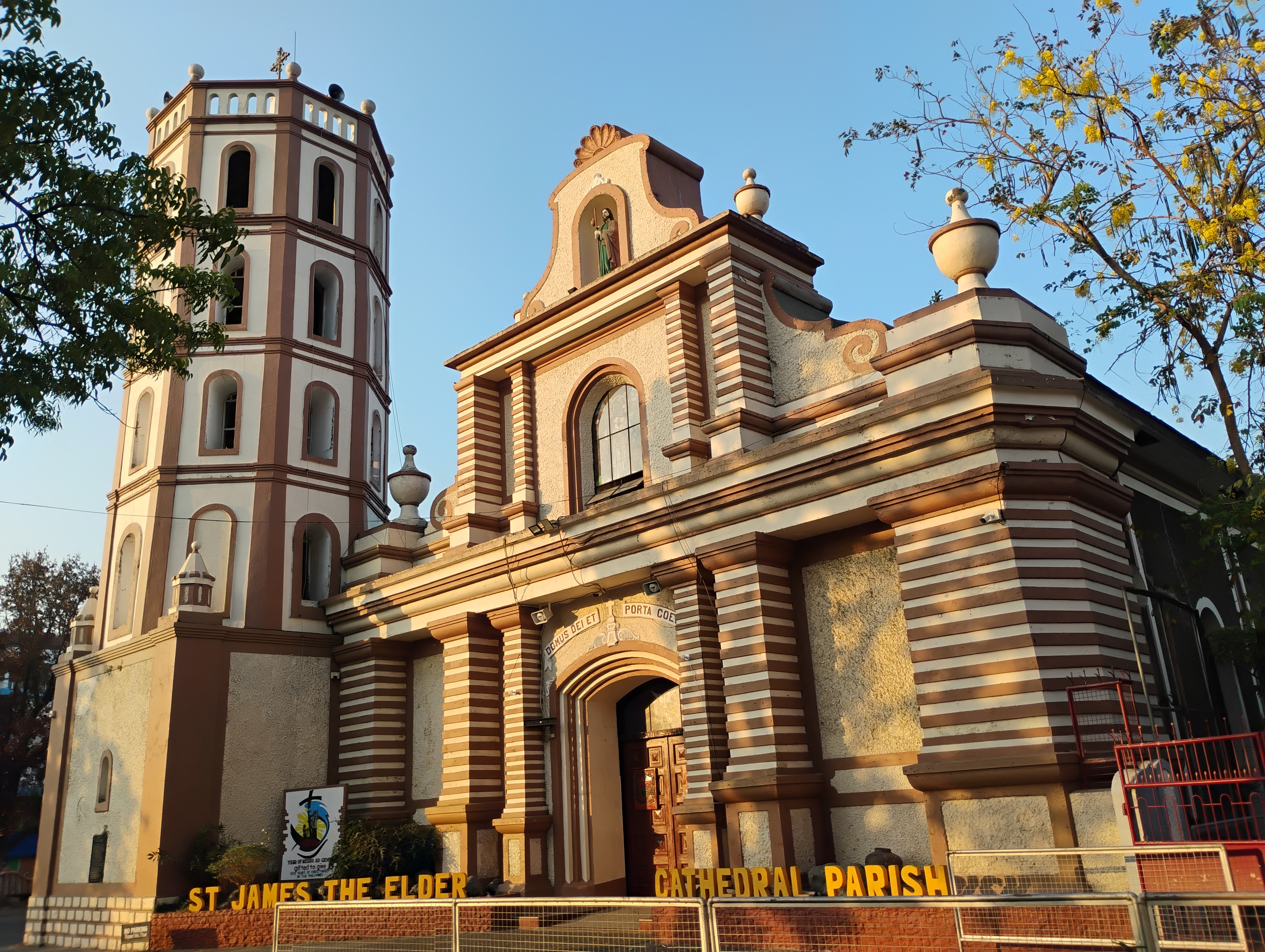
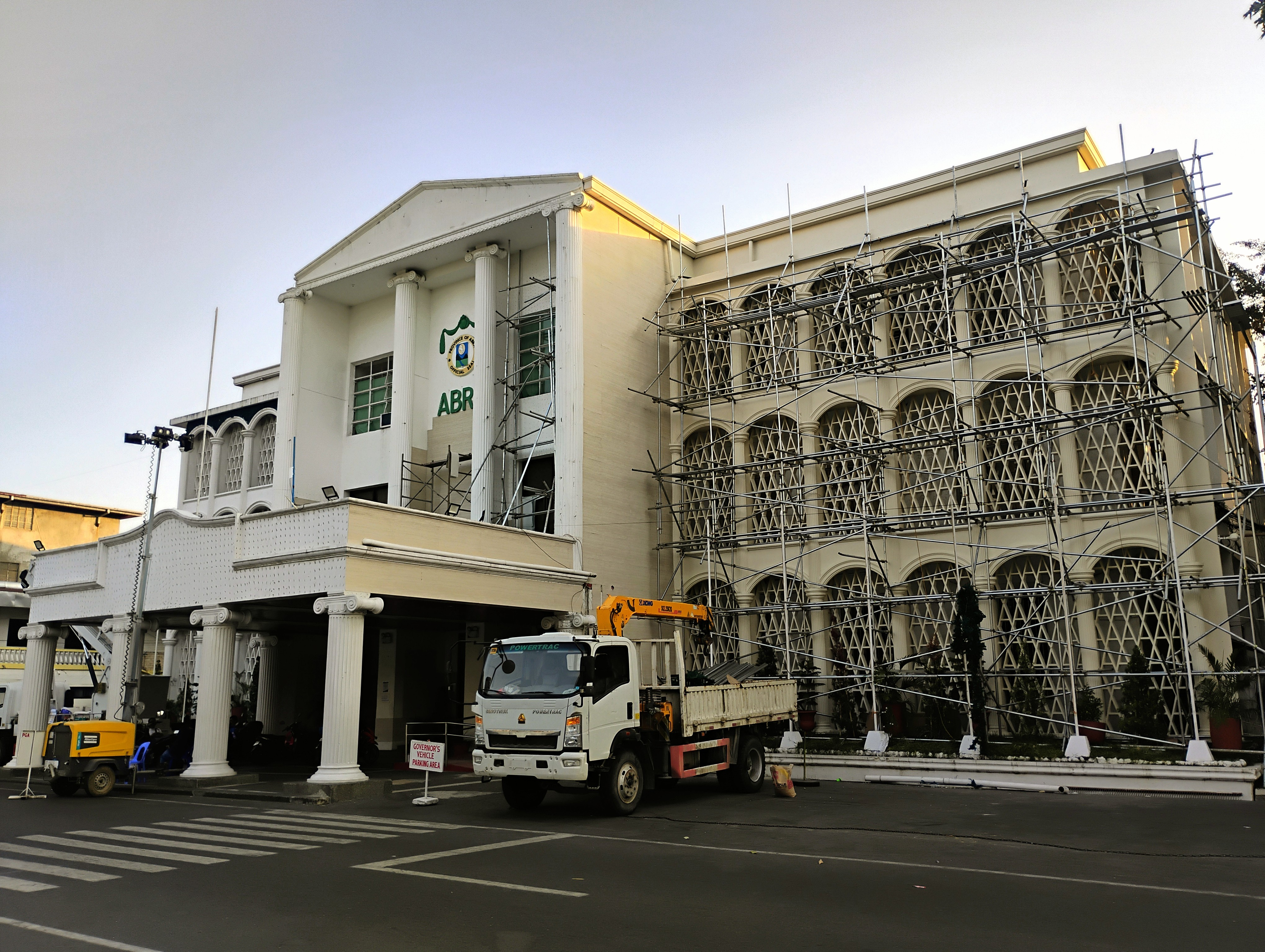
- Skyline of Bangued Bangued Cathedral Abra Provincial Capitol

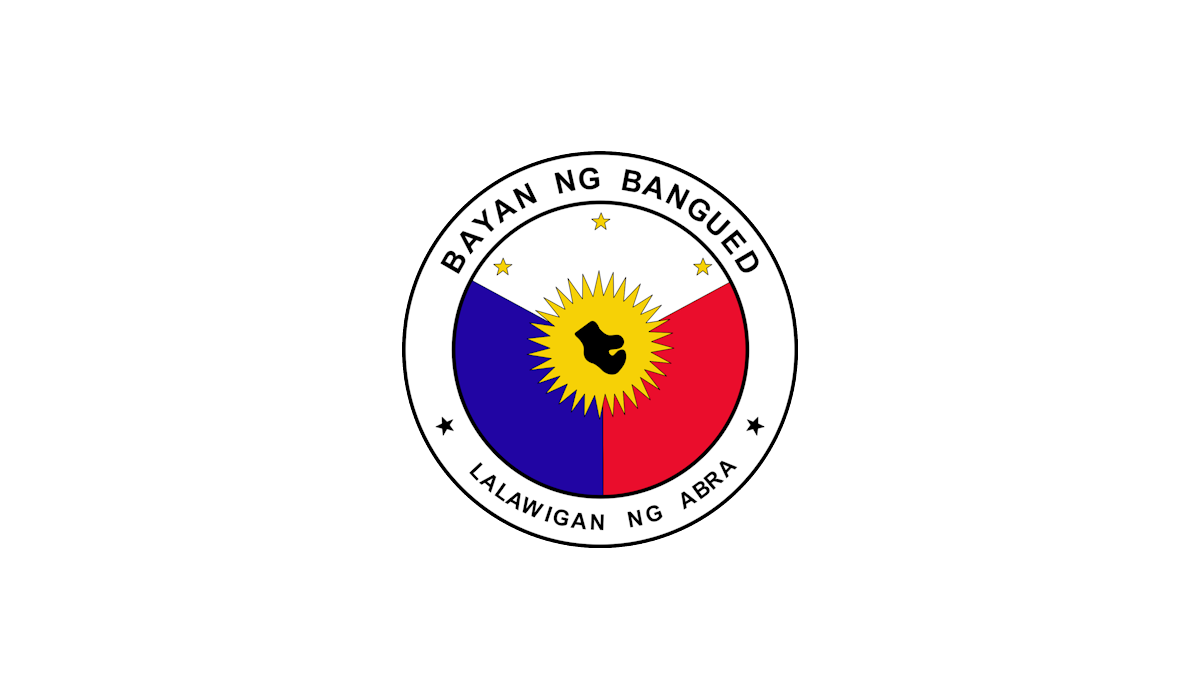
- Flag Seal

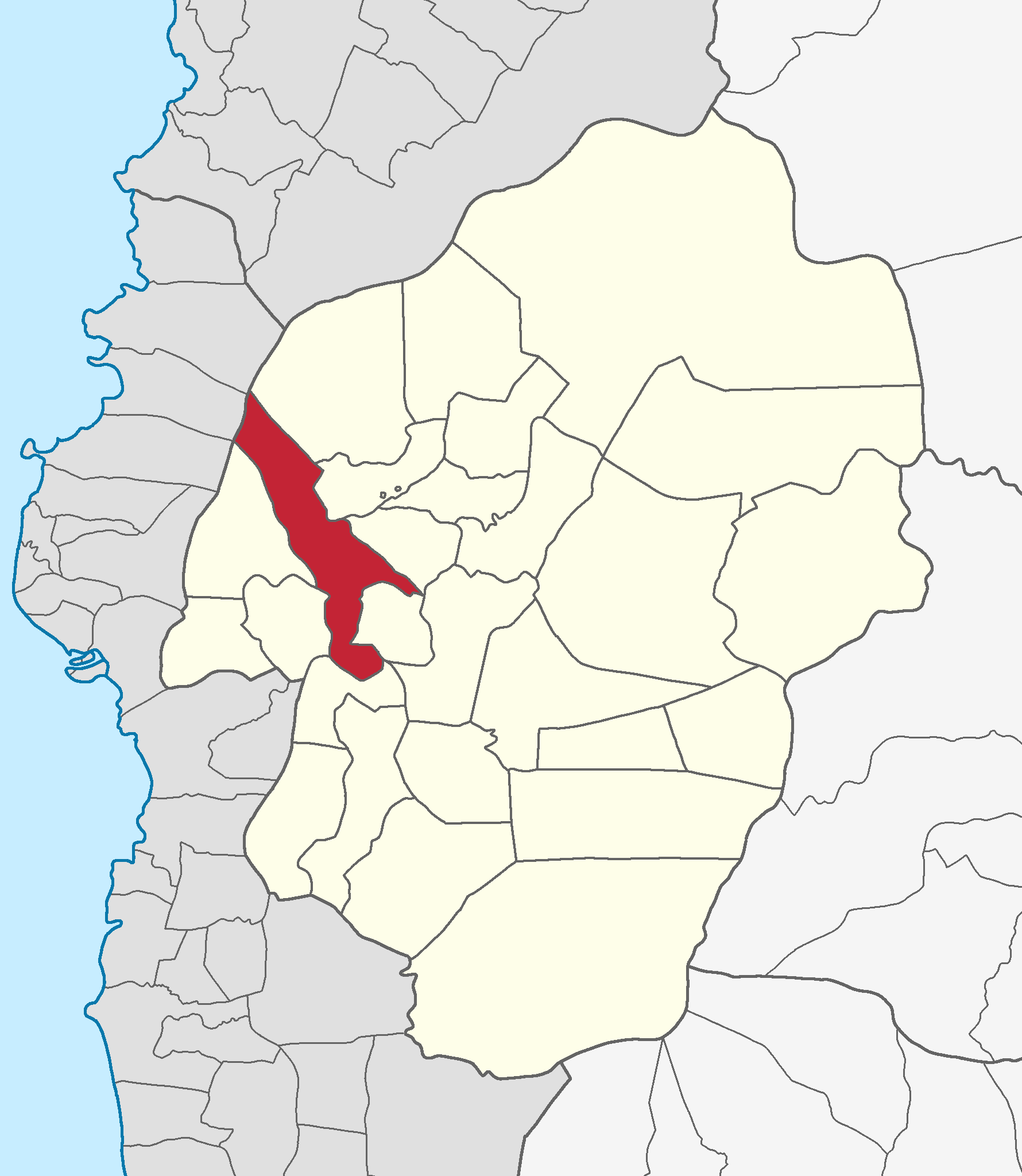
- Map of Abra with Bangued highlighted
- Interactive map of Bangued
- Location within the Philippines
- Coordinates: 17°36′N 120°37′E
- Country: Philippines
- Region: Cordillera Administrative Region
- Province: Abra
- District: Lone district
- Barangays: 31 (see Barangays)

Government
  - Type: Sangguniang Bayan
  - Mayor: Pope Cardenas (PFP)
  - Vice Mayor: Allan Seares (PFP)
  - Representative: Joseph Santo Niño B. Bernos
  - Municipal Council: Members: Allen Brix L. Bachiller; Walter S. Benedito; Gisela A. Abero; Anthony V. Barras; Raymund T. Bites; Gladys P. Reyes; Danilo P. Gonzales; Jubert B. Camaddo
  - Electorate: 35,227 voters (2025)

Area
  - Total: 105.70 km^{2} (40.81 sq mi)
- Elevation: 57 m (187 ft)
- Highest elevation: 401 m (1,316 ft)
- Lowest elevation: 23 m (75 ft)

Population (2024 census)
  - Total: 48,331
  - Density: 457.25/km^{2} (1,184.3/sq mi)
  - Households: 12,279

Economy
  - Income class: 1st municipal income class
  - Poverty incidence: 5.41% (2023)
  - Revenue: ₱ 388.4 million (2024)
  - Assets: ₱ 466.7 million (2024)
  - Expenditure: ₱ 355.3 million (2024)
  - Liabilities: ₱ 51.97 million (2024)

Service provider
  - Electricity: Abra Electric Cooperative (ABRECO)
- Time zone: UTC+8 (PST)
- ZIP code: 2800
- PSGC: 1400101000
- IDD : area code: +63 (0)74
- Native languages: Ilocano, Itneg, Filipino
- Website: www.bangued.gov.ph

Bangued, officially the Municipality of Bangued (Ilocano: Ili ti Bangued; Filipino: Bayan ng Bangued), is a municipality and capital of the province of Abra, Philippines. According to the 2024 census, it has a population of 48,331 people making it the most populous municipality in the province.

== Etymology ==
The name Bangued evolved from the Ilocano word "Bangan," which means roadblock or blockade.

The Tinguians prevented the Spanish forces from penetrating their area and they placed roadblocks on all roads leading to the place. They also cut large logs and threw them to the Abra River to prevent the incoming Spanish colonist and Ilocano settlers from entering the area with the use of their boats and bamboo rafts. When the logs reached Nagtalabungan the strength of the currents allowed many of these trees to be left behind for the strong current gets narrower as it bends westwards on its course to the South China Sea across a gap in the Ilocos range, better known as "Banaoang." These logs were also made as obstacles and big rocks were placed along the roads which the natives called "bangan".

== History ==
=== Early history ===
The early settlers of the area were the Tinguians belonging to the Bago, Masadiit, Ibanao, and Indayas tribes, who later intermarried with immigrants from Ilocos. The Tinguians resisted the Christianization efforts introduced by Spanish friars who, along with their Ilocano subordinates, moved into the eastern settlements.

=== Spanish period ===
In 1598, Augustinian fathers Martin and Minon were able to penetrate the valley and found a "mission" in Bangued. A Spanish military garrison was also established to protect the inhabitants from the attacks of the headhunters.

In November 1601, Fray Esteban Marín in the company of an expedition under Captain Mateo de Aranda arrived in Abra but was killed, with his body tied up to a tree, shot by arrows, before being dismembered.

In 1614, Fr. Juan de Pareja, "Conquistador Espiritual" of Abra, arrived with the protection of the Spanish garrison and advanced further to the interior. In 1615, Fr. Juan Pareja organized Bangued as a mission center and baptized 3,000 Tingguians with the help of their chief, Manuel Dumawal.

On April 5, 1617, Bangued was created into a ministry by the Augustinians and Fr. Pedro Columbo was the first minister. Bangued was made an independent mission territory in 1692.

The construction of the big church in Bangued began in 1722 and was completed in 1807. It was about 73 meters long. A spacious convento was built adjoining it. It later became the Sacred Heart of Jesus Academy, which is now the Holy Spirit Academy, a convent for sisters and a school for girls and boys.

At July 25, 1861, the Feast of St. James the Great (Apo Senor Santiago), the town was formally inaugurated.

In August 1898, Fr. Inocencio Vega was the last Spanish missionary to work in Bangued.

=== American period ===
The Americans colonized the country and established the civil government. Bangued, Abra, transitioned from Spanish rule to a U.S.-backed civil government, becoming a key administrative center. It experienced modernization but faced upheaval, including temporary annexation to Ilocos Sur due to finances and, finally, severe destruction by American bombing during World War II's liberation in 1945.

=== World War II and Japanese occupation period ===
On March 10, 1945, at 3:00 P.M., American planes guided by Filipinos dropped incendiary bombs on the capitol, the Catholic Church and adjoining buildings. On subsequent days the whole town was bombed. Whoever the bombers saw, they shot with machine-guns and the whole town was in flames and ruins. Many were burned and whoever could escape fled to the barrios.

== Geography ==
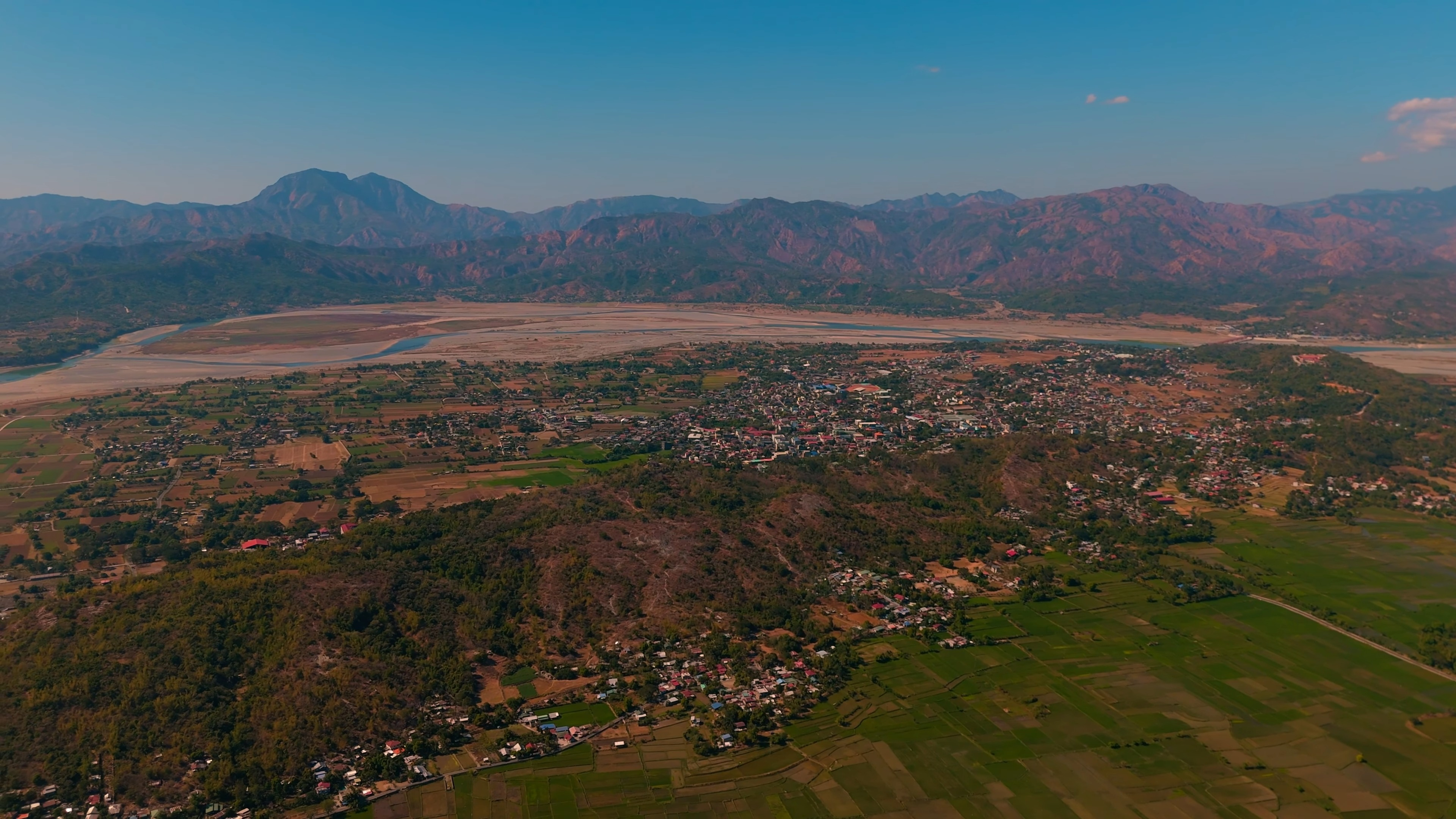
Bangued with the Abra River in the background and the Cassamata Hill in the foreground.

Bangued is a landlocked municipality, located at 17°36′N 120°37′E. It is elongated in shape towards the north and south, and bisected through the center by the large Abra River. It is situated in the western portion of the province with boundaries defined by the Province of Ilocos Norte and the Municipality of Danglas in the north; La Paz, Tayum and Peñarrubia in the east; San Isidro in the south, and Langiden and Pidigan in the west.

According to the Philippine Statistics Authority, the municipality has a land area of 105.70 square kilometres (40.81 sq mi) constituting 2.54% of the 4,165.25-square-kilometre- (1,608.21 sq mi) total area of Abra. The town is generally mountainous from north to south; however, it is flat and rolling at the midsection. From here it has an elevation of 30 metres (98 ft) above mean sea level. In the north, which consists mostly of mountains, elevation ranges from 60 to 1,036 metres (197 to 3,399 ft). In the south, which is interspersed with mountain and hills, elevation ranges from 45 to 300 metres (148 to 984 ft). One such hill is Cassamata Hill which was declared a national park.

Bangued is situated 405.92 kilometres (252.23 mi) from the country's capital city of Manila. It is accessible through the Abra-Ilocos Sur National Road from the west, Abra-Kalinga Road from the north-east, and Abra-Ilocos Norte Road from the North.

=== Climate ===
Climate data for Bangued, Abra
Month	Jan	Feb	Mar	Apr	May	Jun	Jul	Aug	Sep	Oct	Nov	Dec	Year
Mean daily maximum °C (°F)	29 (84)	31 (88)	32 (90)	34 (93)	32 (90)	31 (88)	30 (86)	30 (86)	30 (86)	30 (86)	30 (86)	29 (84)	31 (87)
Mean daily minimum °C (°F)	18 (64)	19 (66)	20 (68)	23 (73)	24 (75)	24 (75)	24 (75)	24 (75)	24 (75)	22 (72)	21 (70)	19 (66)	22 (71)
Average rainfall mm (inches)	31 (1.2)	30 (1.2)	42 (1.7)	79 (3.1)	230 (9.1)	412 (16.2)	617 (24.3)	497 (19.6)	422 (16.6)	313 (12.3)	140 (5.5)	71 (2.8)	2,884 (113.6)
Average rainy days	4.6	4.0	6.2	9.1	19.5	23.2	24.0	22.5	21.5	15.2	10.5	6.0	166.3
Source: Meteoblue

The climate falls under the first type of tropical climate, which is characterized by two pronounced seasons, dry from November to April and wet during the remaining months of the year. Prevailing wind blowing in the area is mostly in the direction from north-west to southeast. However, during summer in the absence of weather disturbance, wind blows from north to south or east to west.

=== Barangays ===
Bangued is politically subdivided into 31 barangays with 77 sitios. Each barangay consists of puroks and some have sitios.

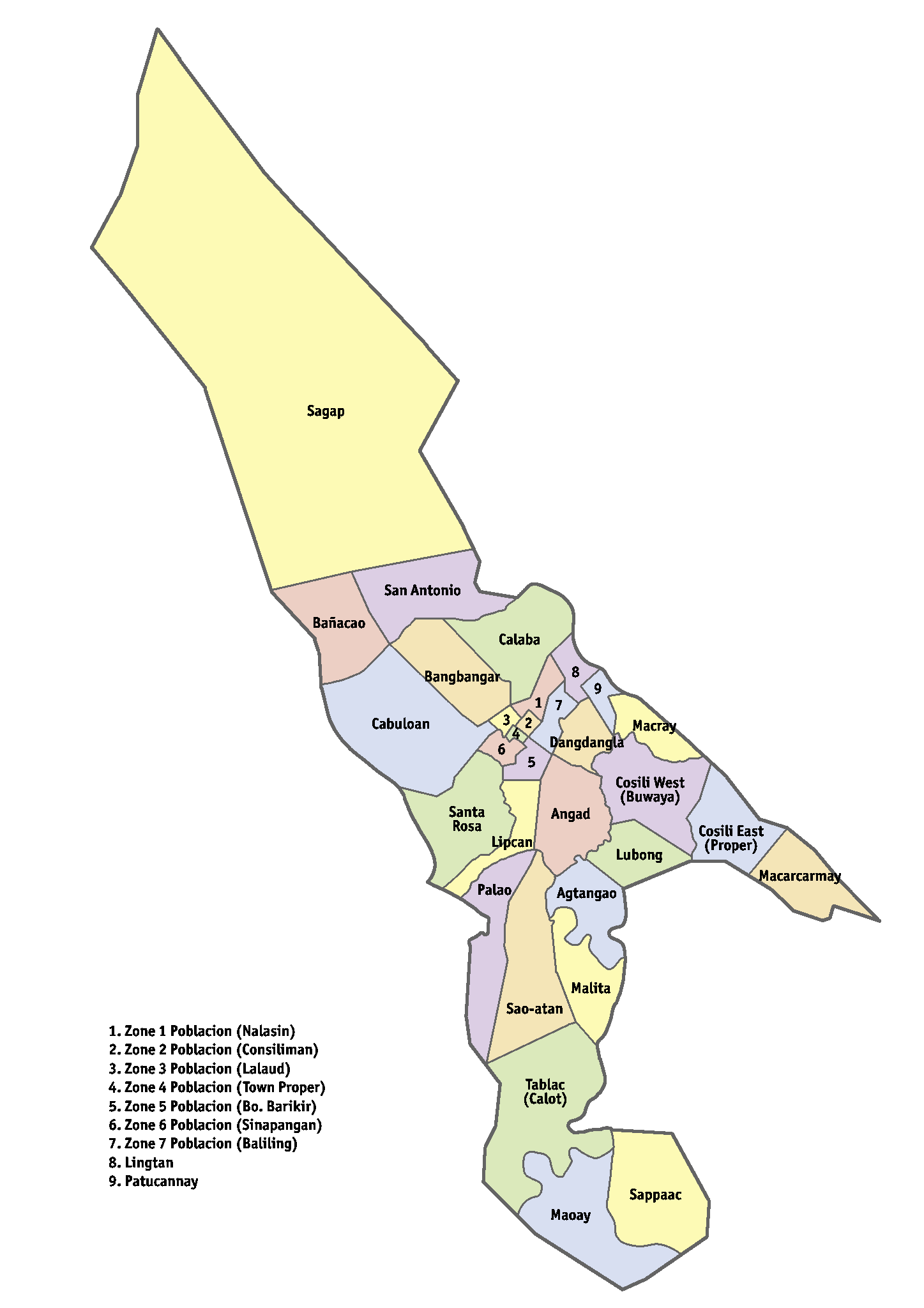
Political map of Bangued

PSGC	Barangay	Population			±% p.a.	
		2024		2010		
140101001	Agtangao	4.7%	2,295	2,164	▴	0.41%
140101002	Angad	5.1%	2,464	2,298	▴	0.49%
140101004	Bañacao	5.1%	2,486	1,749	▴	2.48%
140101003	Bangbangar	2.6%	1,243	1,190	▴	0.30%
140101005	Cabuloan	2.1%	1,028	1,131	▾	−0.66%
140101006	Calaba	7.2%	3,494	2,890	▴	1.33%
140101009	Cosili East (Proper)	1.9%	908	957	▾	−0.37%
140101008	Cosili West (Buaya)	2.8%	1,336	1,175	▴	0.90%
140101010	Dangdangla	4.4%	2,149	1,623	▴	1.97%
140101011	Lingtan	1.8%	859	862	▾	−0.02%
140101012	Lipcan	4.1%	1,975	1,676	▴	1.15%
140101013	Lubong	1.4%	699	690	▴	0.09%
140101014	Macarcarmay	1.4%	667	695	▾	−0.29%
140101016	Macray	1.5%	749	755	▾	−0.06%
140101017	Malita	0.8%	401	373	▴	0.51%
140101015	Maoay	1.5%	742	736	▴	0.06%
140101018	Palao	3.5%	1,697	1,676	▴	0.09%
140101019	Patucannay	3.0%	1,450	1,411	▴	0.19%
140101020	Sagap	1.8%	863	775	▴	0.75%
140101021	San Antonio	1.8%	878	913	▾	−0.27%
140101022	Santa Rosa	4.1%	1,997	1,784	▴	0.79%
140101023	Sao-atan	2.2%	1,077	976	▴	0.69%
140101024	Sappaac	2.7%	1,318	1,238	▴	0.44%
140101007	Tablac (Calot)	3.2%	1,541	1,408	▴	0.63%
140101031	Zone 1 Poblacion (Nalasin)	4.6%	2,212	2,017	▴	0.64%
140101025	Zone 2 Poblacion (Consiliman)	2.8%	1,376	1,325	▴	0.26%
140101026	Zone 3 Poblacion (Lalaud)	4.0%	1,927	1,622	▴	1.21%
140101027	Zone 4 Poblacion (Town Proper)	2.2%	1,073	1,040	▴	0.22%
140101028	Zone 5 Poblacion (Bo. Barikir)	5.3%	2,566	2,277	▴	0.84%
140101029	Zone 6 Poblacion (Sinapangan)	3.9%	1,884	1,789	▴	0.36%
140101030	Zone 7 Poblacion (Baliling)	5.8%	2,809	2,721	▴	0.22%
	Total		48,331	43,936	▴	0.67%

== Demographics ==
Population census of Bangued

Year	Pop.	±% p.a.
1903	12,956	—
1918	14,383	+0.70%
1939	15,287	+0.29%
1948	14,792	−0.37%
1960	19,368	+2.27%
1970	24,587	+2.41%

Year	Pop.	±% p.a.
1975	25,597	+0.81%
1980	28,666	+2.29%
1990	34,184	+1.78%
1995	35,450	+0.68%
2000	38,965	+2.05%
2007	46,179	+2.37%

Year	Pop.	±% p.a.
2010	43,936	−1.80%
2015	48,163	+1.76%
2020	50,382	+0.95%
2024	48,331	−0.99%

Source: Philippine Statistics Authority

In the 2024 census, Bangued had a population of 48,331 people. The population density was 460 inhabitants per square kilometre (1,200/sq mi).

=== Language ===
Ilocano and Itneg are the main languages of Bangued.

== Economy ==
Poverty incidence of Bangued

Source: Philippine Statistics Authority

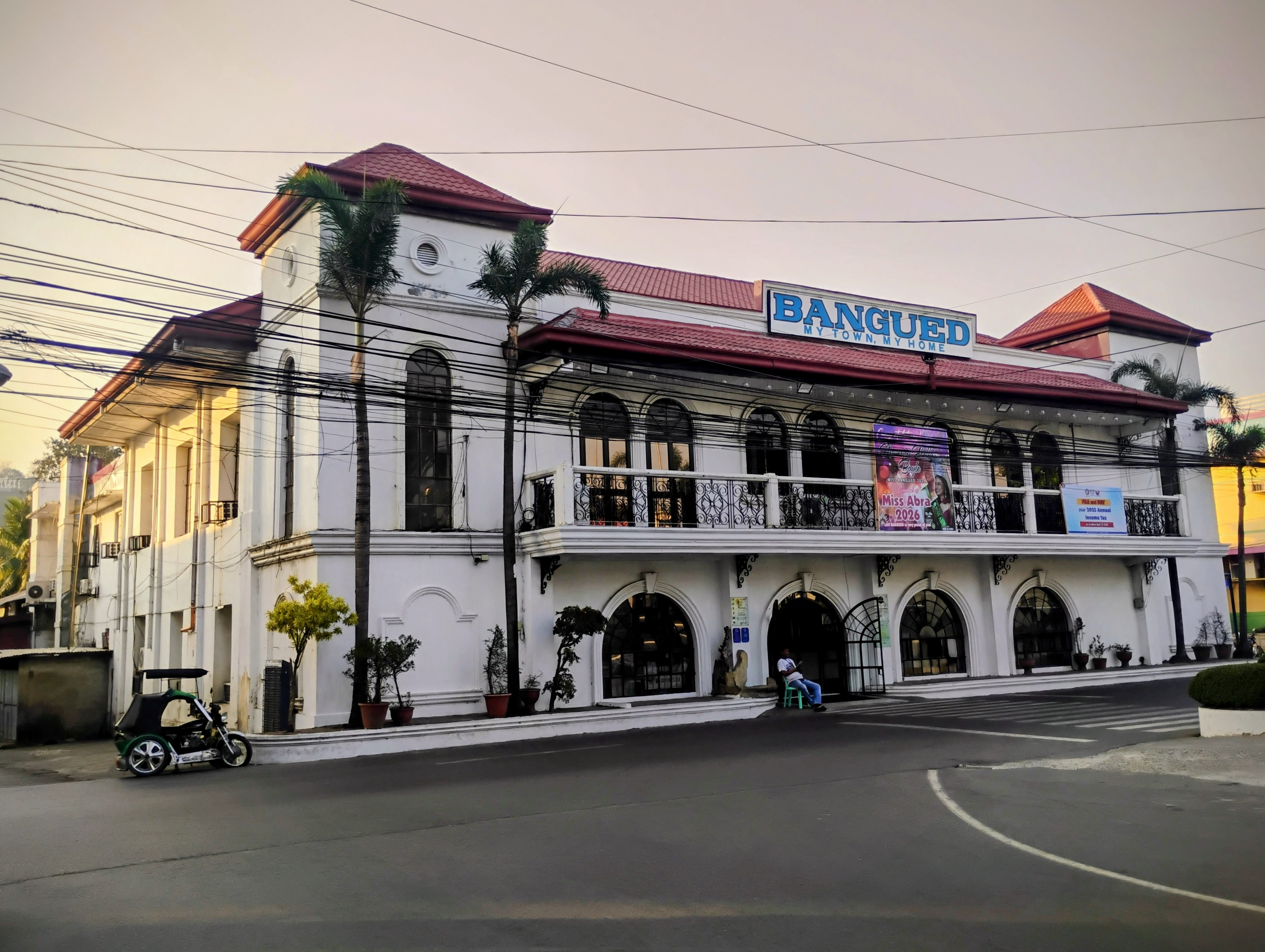
Municipal hall

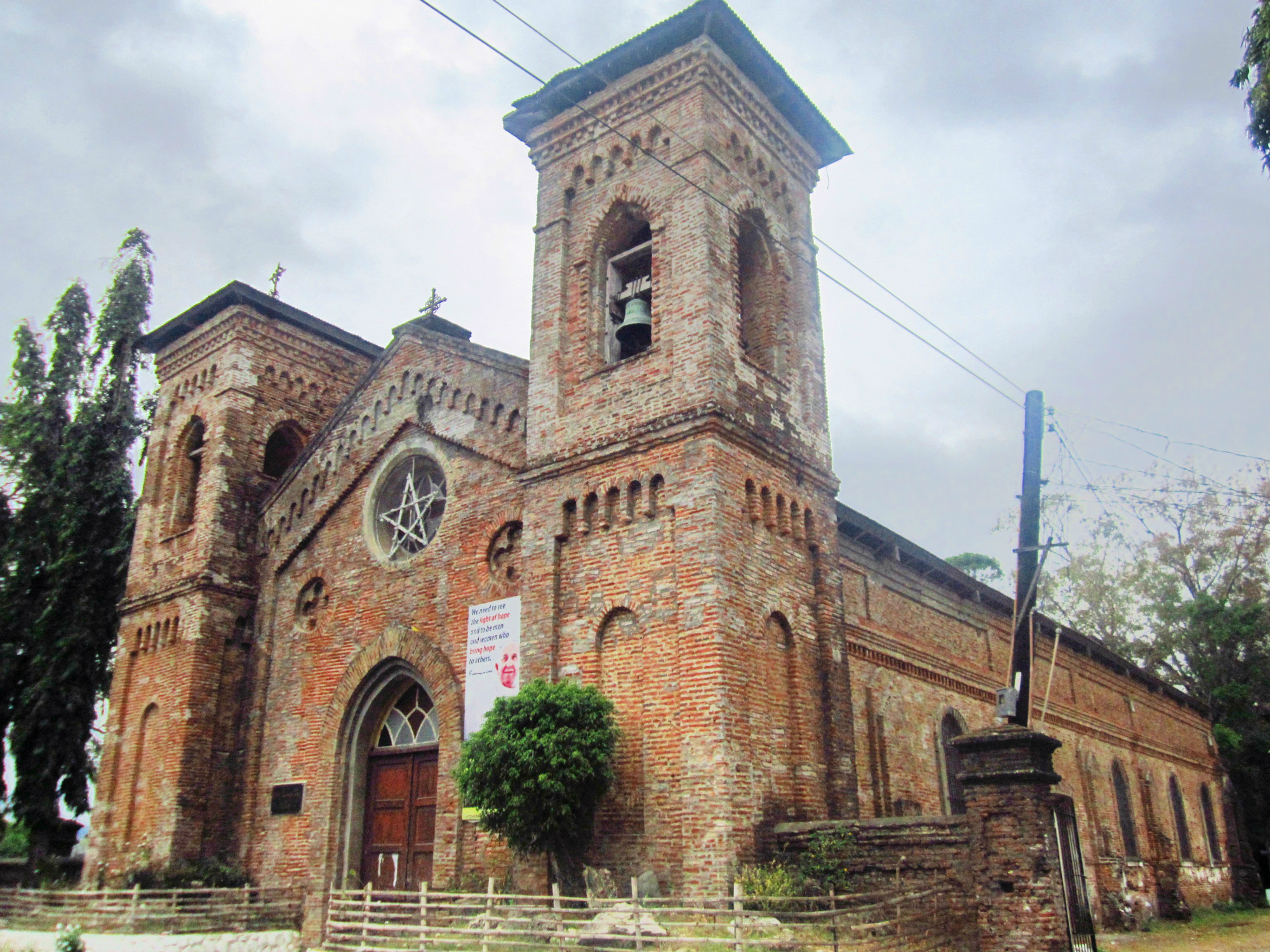
San Lorenzo Ruiz Shrine

The economy of the municipality is heavily dependent on agriculture particularly palay and corn, followed by trade and industry. Chinese businessmen dominate trade and manufacturing as a common preoccupation of the populace.

The commercial activity of Bangued is confined in the urban core establishing a linear pattern of development along major thoroughfares. This is evident from Torrijos Street to Taft Street of Zone 5, McKinley Street to Santiago Street and Partelo Street of Zone 4, and Capitulacion Street of Zone 1 and Zone 2.

For the year 2000 there were 1,539 commercial/business enterprises classified as wholesale and retail trade, dry and wet markets, banking and finance, service and others. There were 9 large suppliers of lumber, hardware and other construction supplies and materials. Likewise there were also about 3 large contractors with undetermined number of small to medium scale. On the other hand, there were also a number of large to medium scale suppliers of general merchandise, groceries and various types of prime commodities.

As the economic center of Abra, small scale or cottage industries abound. The most common are hollow blocks and other concrete products manufacturing with gravel and sand readily available at the Abra River bank. Wood and bamboo craft are also promising business enterprises with raw materials available in the vicinity and in the hinterlands for narra and other species of hardwood, rattan, and bamboos. Metalcraft, tinsmithing, jewelry making is also expanding while a lot of households are now in the small scale processing or value adding activities appertaining to various food items.

== Government ==
=== Local government ===
Bangued, belonging to the lone congressional district of the province of Abra, is governed by a mayor designated as its local chief executive and by a municipal council as its legislative body in accordance with the Local Government Code. The mayor, vice mayor, and the councilors are elected directly by the people through an election which is being held every three years.

=== Elected officials ===
Members of the Municipal Council (2025–2028):

- Congressman: Joseph Santo Niño B. Bernos (Lakas)
- Mayor: Perfecto B. Cardenas (PFP)
- Vice-Mayor: Allan P. Seares (PFP)
- Councilors:
  - Allen Brix L. Bachiller (Lakas)
  - Walter S. Benedito (NPC)
  - Gisela A. Abero (Lakas)
  - Anthony V. Barras (NPC)
  - Raymund T. Bites (Lakas)
  - Gladys P. Reyes (PFP)
  - Danilo P. Gonzales (Lakas)
  - Jubert B. Camaddo (Lakas)

== Transportation ==
Passenger buses, mini-buses, jeepneys and tricycles including cargo are the major means of transportation in the town. Buses, mini-buses and jeepneys ply the longer routes covering the entire province of Abra and out, while tricycles serve only the inner arteries of the municipality's barangays including the adjacent towns of La Paz, Peñarrubia, Pidigan, and Tayum on a chartered ride basis.

Buses going in and out of the province have their own permanent station/terminal, while all the rest are accommodated and parked along various open lots, gasoline stations, etc. Some of the transportation companies that have their own terminal include Partas, Dominion, and the GMW Trans.

There are jeeps that ply from Bangued to Narvacan.

GMW trans have daily trips to Tuguegarao and Santiago City; while Partas have trips to Baguio and Metro Manila on a daily basis.

== Healthcare ==
- Valera Medical Hospital (formerly known as Saint James Clinic), Zone 7 — Private
- Bangued Christian Hospital, Lorben's Hill, Torrijos St., Zone 5 — Private
- Assumpta Hospital, Zone 7 - Private
- Abra Provincial Hospital, Barangay Calaba — Public
- Seares Memorial Clinic, Zone 4 — Private
- Saint Jude Clinic, Zone 7 — Private
- Bobila Clinic, Zone 7 — Private

== Education ==
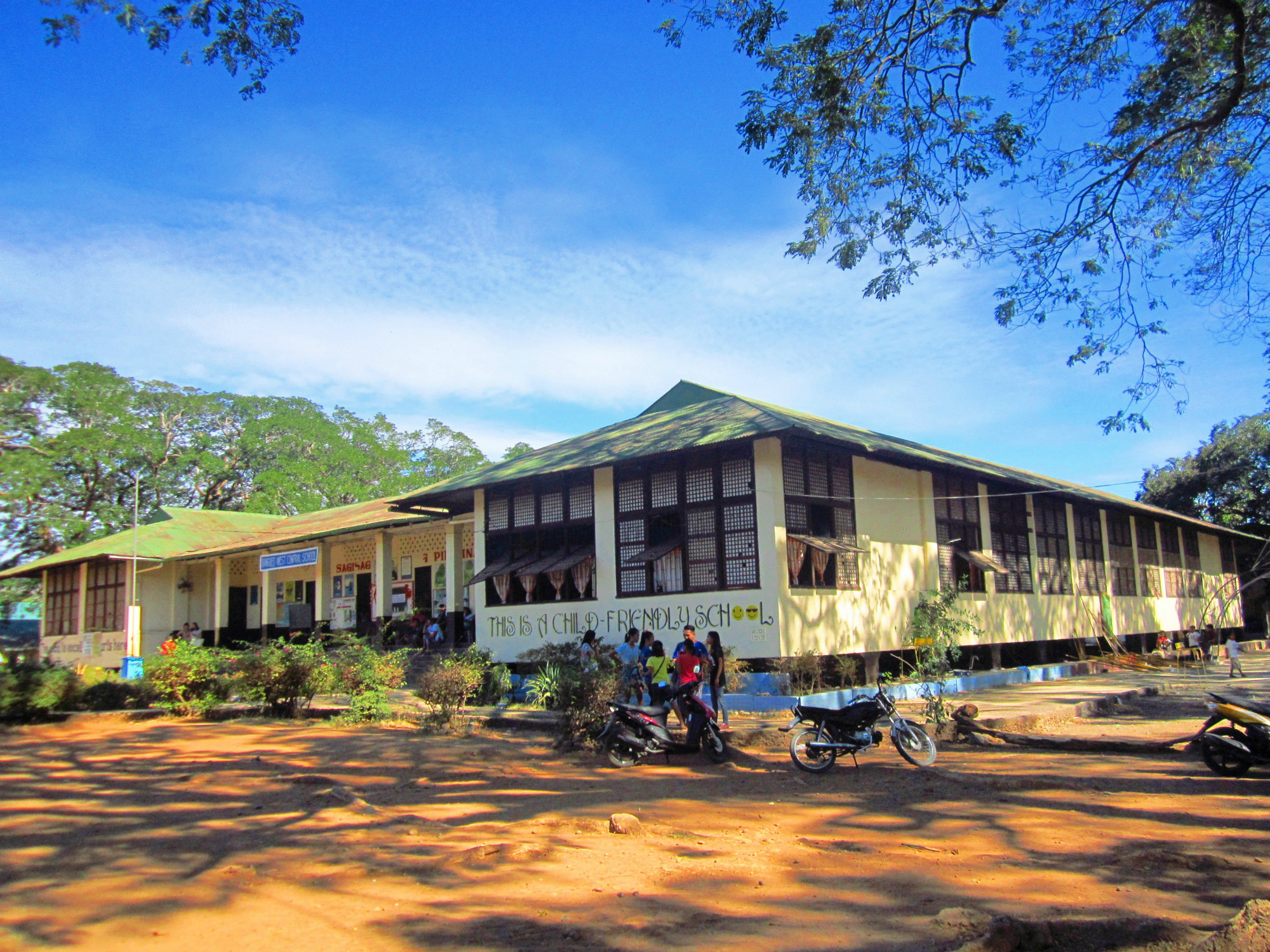
Bangued West Elementary School

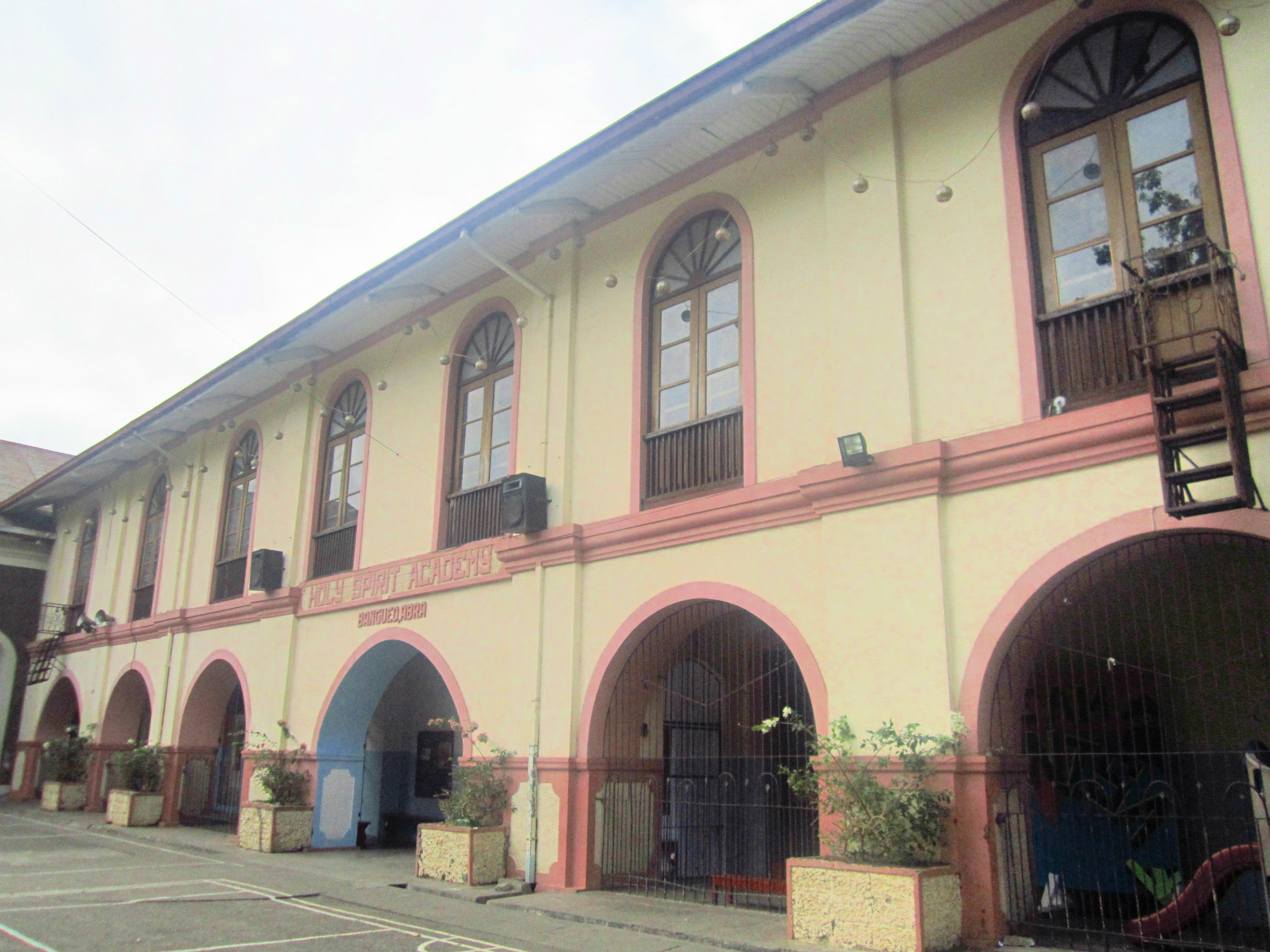
Holy Spirit Academy

There are two schools district offices which govern all educational institutions within the municipality. They oversee the management and operations of all private and public, from primary to secondary schools. Theses are Bangued East, and Bangued West.

The municipality has a total of 24 Educational Institutions at all levels. 21 belong to the government while the rest are private. Of the total public schools, 19 belongs to the elementary levels. Most of the educational institutions of higher levels secondary and tertiary are concentrated in the urban core, while elementary schools are strategically located in different barangays forming their own catchment areas. The total number of elementary school teachers in the public sector is 218 giving a gross teacher pupil ratio of 1:30 (SY 1999-2000 DepEd), in the private there are 193 with a ratio of 1:28 in the same period. Two public libraries complement existing facilities, the Provincial Library located al Santiago St. Zone 3 and the Integrated Bar of the Philippines Library located at the Municipal Trial Court.

Aside from these institutions there are at least 15 daycare centers located in different barangays, and 5 private institutions for pre-schoolers complementing that from the government.

=== Primary and elementary schools ===
- Abra District Adventist Multigrade School
- Abra Special Education Center
- Agtangao Elementary School
- Anaraar Ken Namnama Learning Angels Center
- Ave Maria Academy of Abra
- Bacsil Elementary School
- Bangbangar Elementary School
- Bangued East Central School
- Bangued North Elementary School
- Bangued West Central School
- Bañacao Elementary School
- Basic Clues Creative Learning Center
- Calaba Elementary School
- Calot Elementary School
- Cosili Elementary School
- Cosili West Primary School
- Dangdangla Elementary School
- Holy Cross School
- Holy Spirit Academy of Bangued
- Living Faith Academy
- Luba - Tubo Catholic School
- Lubong Primary School
- Macarcarmay Elementary School
- Malita Elementary School
- Maoay Elementary School
- Our Lady of Fatima School
- Our Lady of Guadalupe School
- Patucannay Elementary School
- Sacred Heart Academy
- Sagap Elementary School
- San Antonio Elementary School
- Santa Teresita School
- Sappaac Elementary School
- Sinalang Pilot Elementary School
- Sinapangan Elementary School
- St. Ignatius de Loyola School of Bangued
- Sta. Rosa Primary School
- UCCP Child Care Center

=== Secondary schools ===
- Abra High School
- Abra State Institute of Sciences and Technology (High school)
- Abra Valley Colleges (High school)
- Divine Word College of Bangued
- Holy Spirit Academy of Bangued
- Saint Joseph Seminary
- Sacred Heart School of Bangued

=== Higher educational institutions ===
Abra Valley Colleges

- Abra Valley Colleges
- Data Center College of the Philippines
- Divine Word College of Bangued
- University of Abra (formerly Abra State Institute of Sciences and Technology)

== Notable Personalities ==
- Ignacio Villamor y Borbón - lawyer, former Associate Justice of the Supreme Court; first Filipino President of the University of the Philippines
- Jesus A. Villamor - decorated World War 2 pilot, spy, and Medal of Valor Awardee
- Juan Villamor - revolutionary writer, politician
- Kurt Barbosa – SEA Games gold medallist, Taekwondo proud waving carry the Filipino flag
- Pura Sumangil – community activist
- Quintin Paredes - lawyer, statesman, senator; 5th President of the Senate

== Sister cities ==
- Vigan
