= Cervantes, Ilocos Sur =

Municipality in Ilocos Sur, Philippines

Cervantes
- Municipality
- Municipality of Cervantes
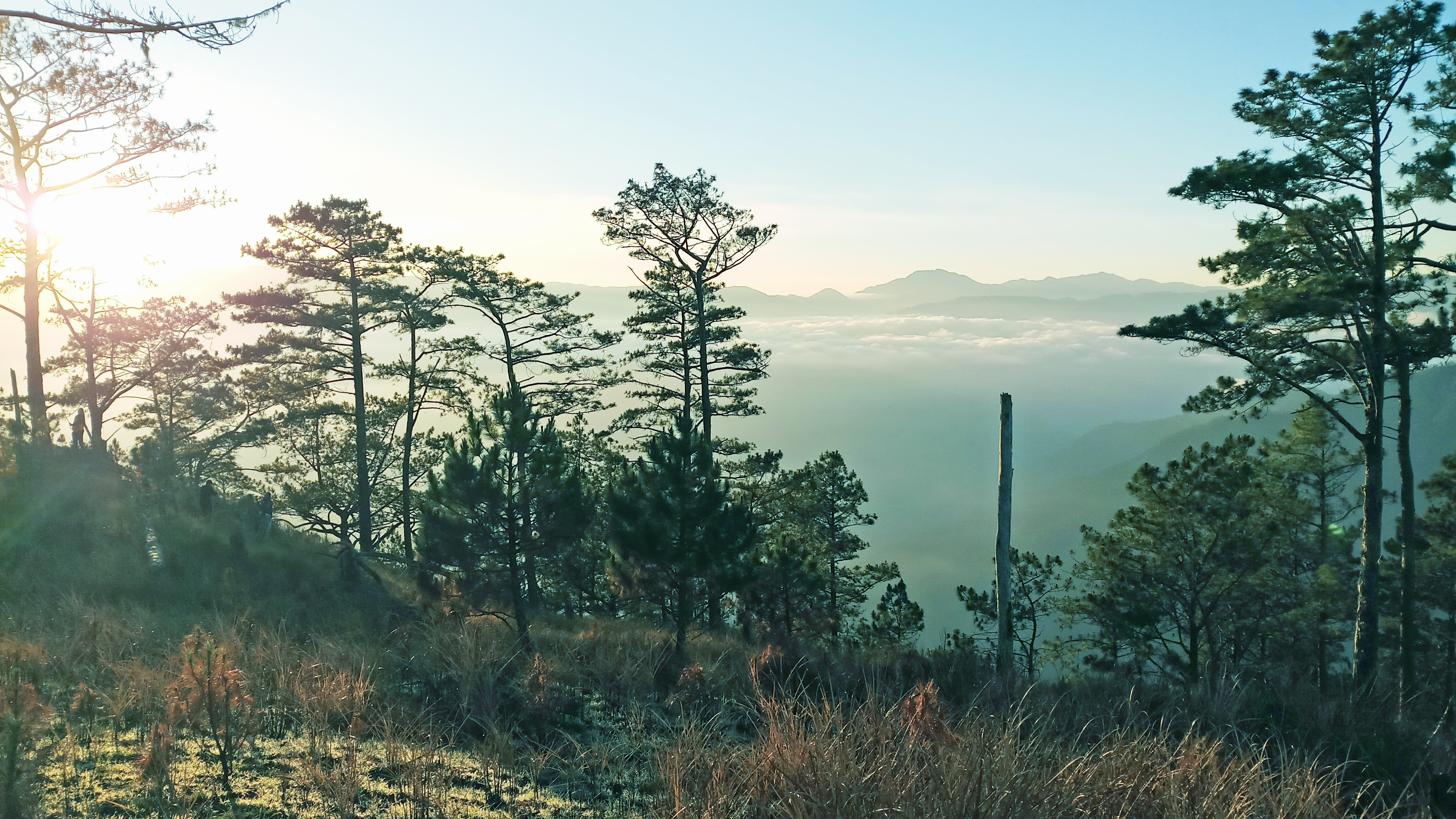
- Sunrise at the summit Mt. Namindaraan, Bessang Pass

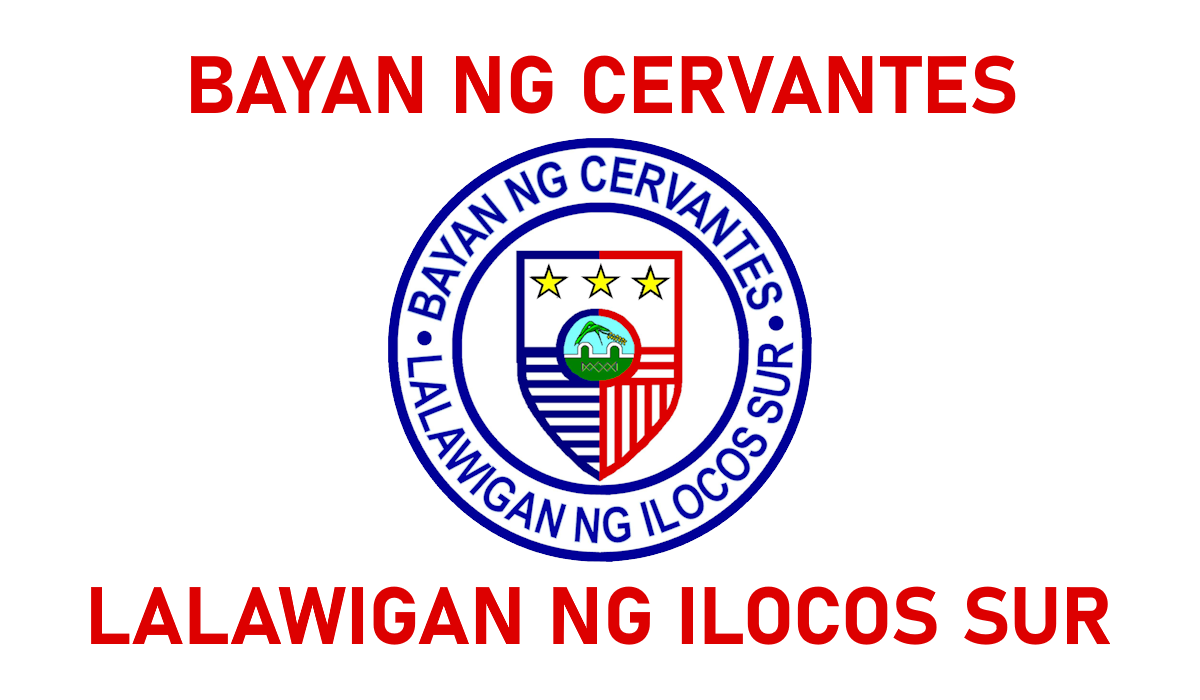
- Flag Seal
- Nickname: Summer Capital of Ilocos Sur
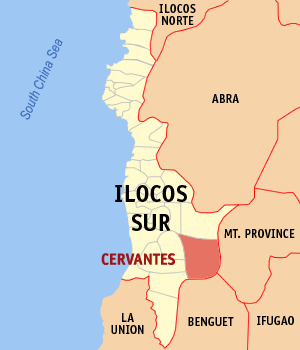
- Map of Ilocos Sur, Lepanto-Bontoc with Cervantes highlighted
- Interactive map of Cervantes
- Location within the Philippines
- Coordinates: 16°59′30″N 120°44′00″E
- Country: Philippines
- Region: Ilocos Sur, Lepanto-Bontoc
- Province: Ilocos Sur, Lepanto-Bontoc
- District: 2nd district
- Barangays: 13 (see Barangays)

Government
  - Type: Sangguniang Bayan
  - Mayor: Pablito Benjamin P. Maggay II
  - Vice Mayor: Armando P. Gaburno
  - Representative: Kristine Singson-Meehan
  - Municipal Council: Members: Rodolfo B. Gaburno; Julieta B. Valdez; Honoria W. Moises; Jenghiz S. Harnois; Zosimo N. Ningala; Rosario C. Pe; Roy G. Dadpaas; Edgardo G. Cortez
  - Electorate: 12,342 voters (2025)

Area
  - Total: 234.70 km^{2} (90.62 sq mi)
- Elevation: 637 m (2,090 ft)
- Highest elevation: 1,335 m (4,380 ft)
- Lowest elevation: 397 m (1,302 ft)

Population (2024 census)
  - Total: 20,065
  - Density: 85.492/km^{2} (221.42/sq mi)
  - Households: 4,370

Economy
  - Income class: 1st municipal income class
  - Poverty incidence: 11.76% (2023)
  - Revenue: ₱ 298.5 million (2024)
  - Assets: ₱ 1,093 million (2024)
  - Expenditure: ₱ 138.7 million (2024)
  - Liabilities: ₱ 36.14 million (2024)

Service provider
  - Electricity: Ilocos Sur Electric Cooperative (ISECO)
- Time zone: UTC+8 (PST)
- ZIP code: 2718
- PSGC: 0102908000
- IDD : area code: +63 (0)77
- Native languages: Ilocano; Tagalog

Cervantes, officially the Municipality of Cervantes (Ilocano: Ili ti Cervantes; Filipino: Bayan ng Cervantes), is a municipality in the province of Ilocos Sur, Philippines. According to the 2024 census, it has a population of 20,065 people.

The municipality is officially the Summer Capital of Ilocos Sur. It has a relatively cooler climate than most of lowland Ilocos Sur due to its topography and proximity to Mountain Province and Benguet. The municipality is home to the Bessang Pass Natural Monument.

== Etymology ==
The origin of the name is unknown or undocumented, but it is believed that it was named after the famous poet Miguel de Cervantes. But the town's history was tied to the poet's name and the people living on the town adopted it as their own official name.

== History ==
The earliest known historical document about Cervantes was that it started as a small Igorot Village known as “Mantamang”, an Igorot word meaning “to look over”. Igorot traders and Chinese merchants who always had to pass the village frequently used trails connecting the lowland and upland neighboring localities.

On March 4, 1879, the residents of Mantamang petitioned that the village be recognized as a Christian town under the district of Lepanto-Amburayan. The town was given the name Cervantes and that remained the name of the town up to the present.

Maximo Lilio de Garcia has written that Cervantes was formerly a barrio when it was founded by the Spanish colonizers. It started with only thirty houses made of light building materials like bamboo and cogon. In spite of the fertile lands that abound the place, the natives used to cultivate only small patches of rice fields, which limited the development of the barrio.

Lilio further stated that Cervantes has a distance of 24 kilometers from Lepanto. The system of communication was maintained on a weekly basis due to the poor road network that traversed the mountains - zigzagging upward the hills back of Cayus where the storage house was located and down to the lowlands reaching the Malaya River, which sometimes overflows during the rainy season, making the trail slippery.

During the Spanish Era, a portion of the land along the banks of the Abra River was used as a penal colony by Spanish soldiers who brought with them the Ilocanos from the lowlands. In 1883, a malaria epidemic affected the colony, prompting Spanish officials to move to the uplands, which is now the present location of the town proper. The delivery of 5,000 grams of quinine ended the epidemic.

At that time, the barrio was founded between Abra and Malaya Rivers, the inhabitants were distributed among the three rancherias. The first settlement was established on an elevated healthful well-ventilated place, where a small house for the children of the neighboring barrios, a storage building for tobacco and barracks were constructed. Springs were the source of potable clean and abundant water supply. The natives cultivated and produced vegetables and fruits suitable to the climate. Coffee was produced on the land annexed to the commendancia.

The next group of settlement founded a rancheria less than a half-kilometer distance from the first settlement. This time better types of houses were built with an estimated population of 819 residents migrating from other rancherias and barrios of Mailac Cambaguio and Magucmay. Then another small community was developed with both sections of Cervantes where a spacious administrative building, other ruinous edifices and barracks built of wood for the civil guards, were located.

Gradually, the original Igorot settlers were displaced and forced to move to the hills and mountains. This explains why at present, Igorot are mostly settled in far-flung barrios, while the Ilocanos, mestizos and those who intermarried with Chinese, Spaniards, Americans and other foreigners populate the central area of the municipality.

The constantly growing of trade in the area made it necessary that it should have a good outlet to the coast. A road was built from Cervantes going west over the Malaya Range exiting at the town of Tagudin, Ilocos Sur. This road was later improved and widened and became passable all the way to Bontoc.

During American rule, the Philippine Commission passed Act No. 410 and Sec. 1 of said act consolidated the Commandancias of Lepanto, Bontoc and Amburayan, together with territory lying between the boundaries of Abra, Cagayan and Bontoc into the Province of Lepanto-Bontoc. This province as divided into three sub-provinces corresponding to the territory of the former comandancias. Cervantes was made the seat of government of Amburayan sub-province. Its military governor was William Dinwiddie.

Later on, Cervantes became a pueblo by virtue of Act No. 441 of the Philippine Commission, which established local civil government in the townships and settlements of Lepanto-Bontoc. And in 1907, Cervantes was transferred to the Province of Ilocos Sur by virtue of the provisions of Act No. 1646, passed by the Philippines Commission on May 15, 1907, providing for the transfer of all sub-provinces of Amburayan and large sections of Lepanto and Benguet to Ilocos Sur and La Union.

The Battle of Bessang Pass Monument

In June 1945 the USAFIP NL spearheaded by the 121st Infantry, defeated the Japanese Imperial Forces at Bessang Pass, part of Malaya, Cervantes. During the Japanese occupation it was at Cervantes, particularly at the pass, that the Japanese forces made their last stand in the operations in northern Luzon against Allied forces. These events hastened the surrender of General Tomoyuki Yamashita, the “Tiger of Malaya”.

In 1945, Cervantes was burned and destroyed. The brick municipal building, the Conchar Hotel, and the sturdy and beautiful houses of the town were burned and reduced to ashes. The main bridge linking Cervantes to Bontoc was bombed.

A monument was unveiled in 1954 at Bessang Pass in honor of the 1,395 United States Armed Forces in the Philippines - Northern Luzon (USAFIP-NL) members killed in this historical place. After the war the town recovered.

Cervantes was energized on March 21, 1991. The power supply came from Mt. Province Electric Cooperative (MOPRECO) through a memorandum of agreement with the Ilocos Sur Electric Cooperative (ISECO).

Cervantes was declared the Summer Capital of the Province of Ilocos Sur by Resolution No. 88 on March 23, 1993.

On July 5, 1995, an interim Protected Area Management Board (PAMB) was organized and on April 23, 2000, President Joseph Estrada signed Proclamation No. 284 declaring the Bessang Pass National Shrine as Protected Areas (included to NIPAS Act of 1992 or RA 7560) under Natural Monument/Landmark Category.

On June 11, 1996, the Municipal Government passed Resolution No. 025 declaring June 14 as special non-working holiday for the town.

== Geography ==
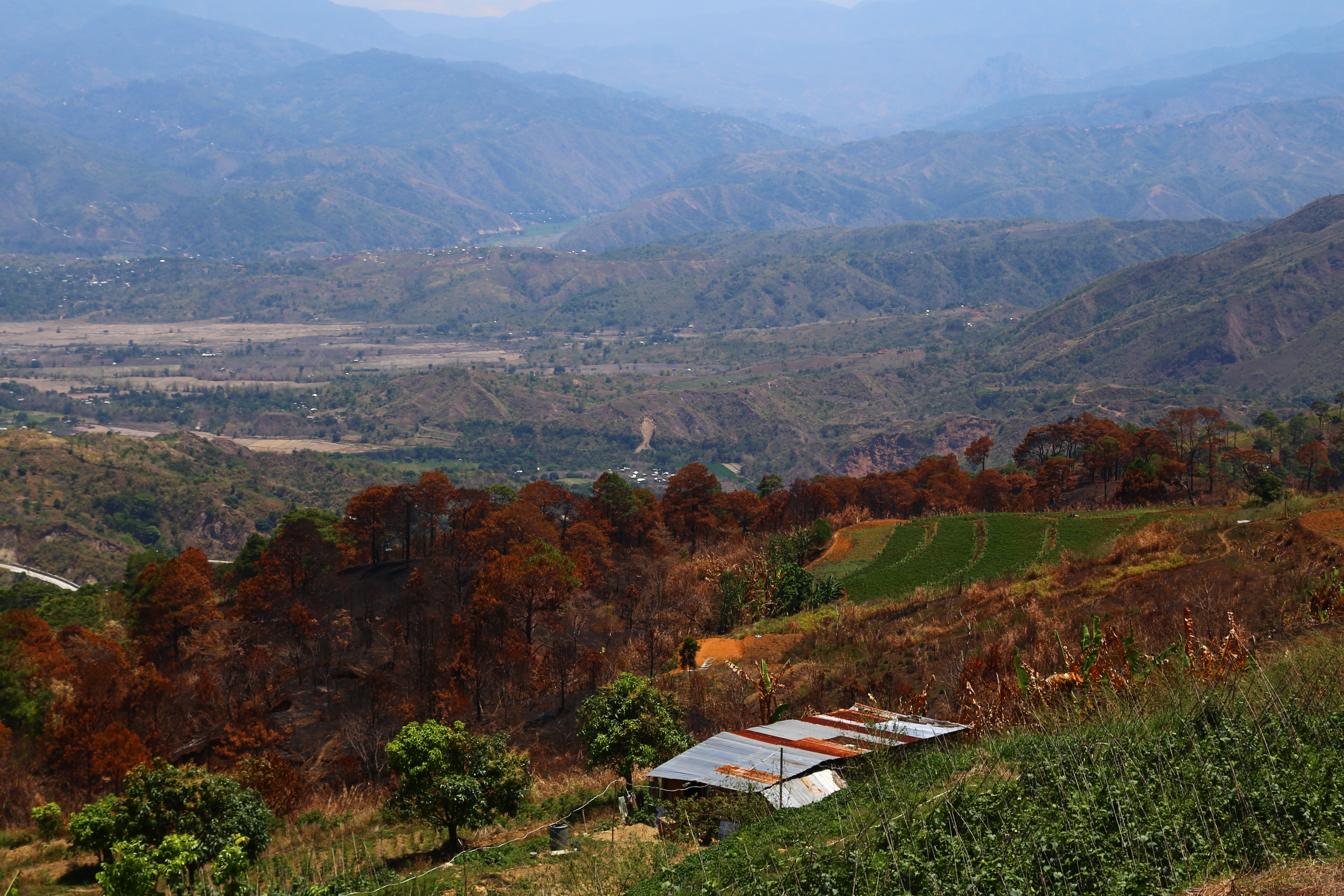
Hills in Malaya, Cervantes

The Municipality of Cervantes lies along the southeastern tip of the province located directly north of both Manila and Baguio. It is cut southwesternly by the Abra River, which is biggest and longest river in the area.

Cervantes is situated 126.01 kilometres (78.30 mi) from the provincial capital Vigan, and 361.03 kilometres (224.33 mi) from the country's capital city of Manila.

=== Barangays ===
Cervantes is politically subdivided into 13 barangays. Each barangay consists of puroks and some have sitios.

- Aluling
- Comillas North
- Comillas South
- Concepcion (Poblacion)
- Dinwede East
- Dinwede West
- Libang
- Malaya
- Pilipil
- Remedios
- Rosario (Poblacion)
- San Juan
- San Luis

=== Climate ===
Climate data for Cervantes, Ilocos Sur
Month	Jan	Feb	Mar	Apr	May	Jun	Jul	Aug	Sep	Oct	Nov	Dec	Year
Mean daily maximum °C (°F)	25 (77)	26 (79)	28 (82)	30 (86)	29 (84)	29 (84)	28 (82)	28 (82)	28 (82)	28 (82)	27 (81)	25 (77)	28 (82)
Mean daily minimum °C (°F)	18 (64)	19 (66)	20 (68)	22 (72)	23 (73)	23 (73)	23 (73)	23 (73)	23 (73)	21 (70)	20 (68)	19 (66)	21 (70)
Average precipitation mm (inches)	35 (1.4)	46 (1.8)	63 (2.5)	117 (4.6)	402 (15.8)	400 (15.7)	441 (17.4)	471 (18.5)	440 (17.3)	258 (10.2)	94 (3.7)	68 (2.7)	2,835 (111.6)
Average rainy days	9.9	11.0	13.9	18.9	26.0	27.3	28.9	28.5	26.1	19.7	14.5	12.8	237.5
Source: Meteoblue (modeled/calculated data, not measured locally)

== Demographics ==
Population census of Cervantes

Year	Pop.	±% p.a.
1903	1,437	—
1918	5,947	+9.93%
1939	7,155	+0.88%
1948	4,346	−5.39%
1960	7,063	+4.13%
1970	8,223	+1.53%

Year	Pop.	±% p.a.
1975	8,976	+1.77%
1980	9,617	+1.39%
1990	12,476	+2.64%
1995	13,777	+1.88%
2000	14,195	+0.64%
2007	14,116	−0.08%

Year	Pop.	±% p.a.
2010	16,573	+6.01%
2015	17,211	+0.72%
2020	19,449	+2.61%
2024	20,065	+0.75%

Source: Philippine Statistics Authority

In the 2024 census, Cervantes had a population of 20,065 people. The population density was 85 inhabitants per square kilometre (220/sq mi).

== Economy ==
Poverty incidence of Cervantes (%)

Source: Philippine Statistics Authority

The municipality of Cervantes centers on agriculture as major economic source. Organic farming is the main agricultural activity in Cervantes.

== Government ==
=== Local government ===
Cervantes, belonging to the second congressional district of the province of Ilocos Sur, is governed by a mayor designated as its local chief executive and by a municipal council as its legislative body in accordance with the Local Government Code. The mayor, vice mayor, and the councilors are elected directly by the people through an election which is being held every three years.

=== Elected officials ===
Members of the Municipal Council (2025–2028)
Position	Name
Congressman	Kristine Singson-Meehan
Mayor	Mary Joyce P. Maggay
Vice-Mayor	Pablito Benjamin P. Maggay II
Councilors	Rodolfo B. Gaburno
Councilors	Honora W. Moises
Councilors	Rolando M. Acyangan
Councilors	Derrick Criss B. Lipawen
Councilors	Edgardo G. Cortez
Councilors	Armando P. Gaburno
Councilors	Jenghiz S. Harnois
Councilors	Romeo G. Amilao

== Healthcare ==
The Cervantes Emergency Hospital was established in 1916 through the initiative of then-Governor Aquilino Calvo of Mountain Province. In June 1960, Republic Act No. 2775 changed the name of the hospital to Bessang Pass Memorial Hospital in memory of the battle of Bessang Pass.

== Education ==
The Cervantes-Quirino Schools District Office governs all private and public educational institutions within the municipality of Cervantes. Also includes the private and public schools situated in Quirino, Ilocos Sur.

The Cervantes Elementary School was established during the Spanish Regime. Saint Agnes Elementary School was founded on February 18, 1920, and on June 10, 1949, the CICM and ICM missionaries inaugurated the Saint Agnes High School. In 1972, Republic Act 4424 established the Cervantes National School of Arts and Trade, which at present is the Ilocos Sur Polytechnic State College- Cervantes Campus. In 1999, the Cervantes National High School was established.

=== Primary and elementary schools ===
- Aluling Elementary School
- Bantay Primary School
- Bissayot Elementary School
- Biwak Primary School
- Cabaroan Elementary School
- Cervantes Central School
- Comillas North Integrated School (Elementary)
- Comillas South Elementary School
- Daing Elementary School
- Dinwede Elementary School
- Lamagan Primary School
- Libang Elementary School
- Liqueo Elementary School
- Malaya Elementary School
- Naiba Primary School
- Namaligan Primary School
- Paang Primary School
- Pautan Primary School
- Pilipil Primary School
- Quinayad Elementary School
- Redeemer's Heart Edifie Me Academy
- San Juan Elementary School
- St. Agnes School (Elementary)
- Tagpeo Elementary School
- Tam-awan Primary School
- Zigzag Pines Elementary School

=== Secondary schools ===
- Cervantes National High School
- Comillas North Integrated School
- ISPSC Cervantes Campus
- St. Agnes School

=== Higher educational institution ===
- Ilocos Sur Polytechnic State College

== Notable people ==
- Alma Moreno - actress and politician
