= Santa, Ilocos Sur =

Municipality in Ilocos Sur, Philippines

Santa
- Municipality
- Municipality of Santa
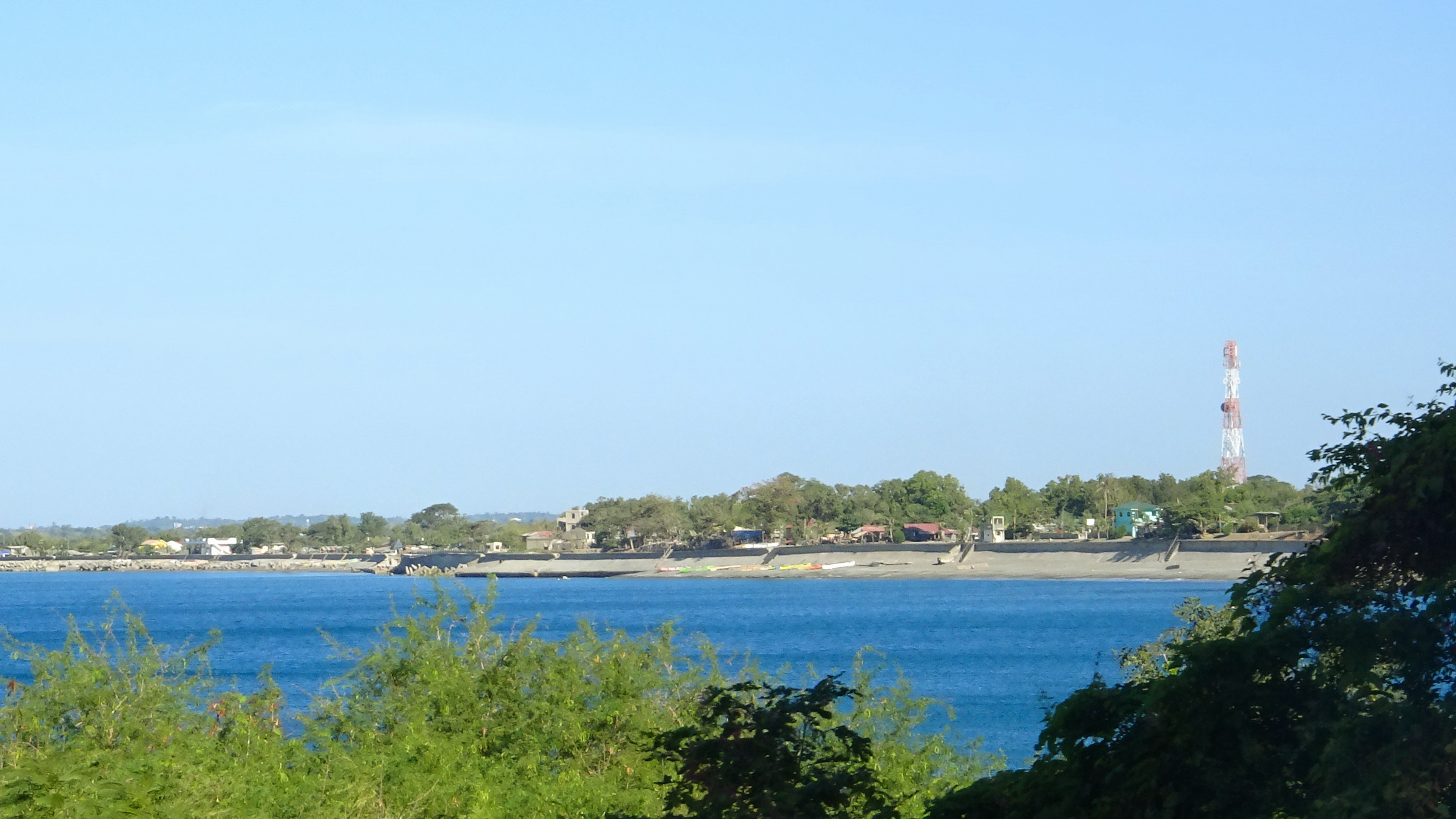
- View of Santa

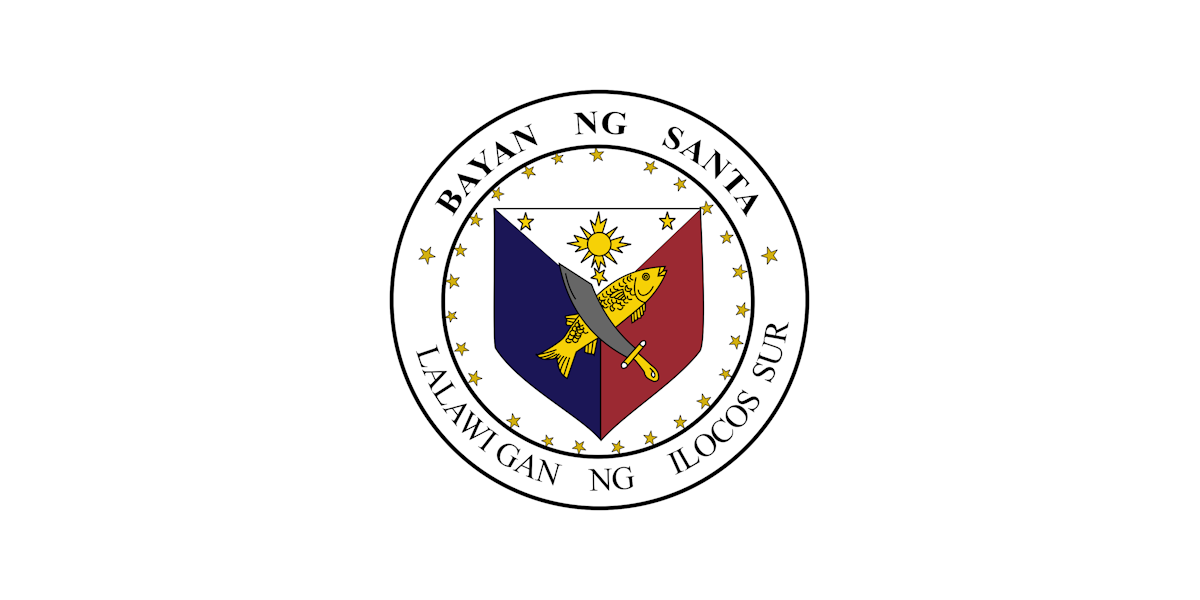
- Flag Seal
- Nicknames: Gateway to the Cordilleras; Virgen Catalina de Alexandria
- Motto: Paspas Santa! (Faster Santa!)
- Anthem: Santa March
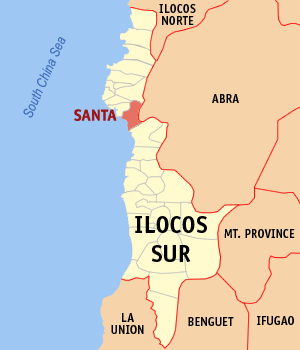
- Map of Ilocos Sur with Santa highlighted
- Interactive map of Santa
- Location within the Philippines
- Coordinates: 17°29′10″N 120°26′04″E
- Country: Philippines
- Region: Ilocos Region
- Province: Ilocos Sur
- District: 2nd district
- Founded: 1576
- Barangays: 26 (see Barangays)

Government
  - Type: Sangguniang Bayan
  - Mayor: Jesus B. Bueno Jr.
  - Vice Mayor: Jeremy Jesus D. Bueno III
  - Representative: Kristine Singson-Meehan
  - Municipal Council: Members: Eugene B. Borje; Lorenzo Q. Formoso Jr.; Domingo L. Ritua; Bella G. Bello; Benedicto A. Burgonio; Marino S. Burgos; Encarnita B. dela Cueva; Reynold B. Queral
  - Electorate: 10,477 voters (2025)

Area
  - Total: 109.10 km^{2} (42.12 sq mi)
- Elevation: 72 m (236 ft)
- Highest elevation: 624 m (2,047 ft)
- Lowest elevation: 0 m (0 ft)

Population (2024 census)
  - Total: 15,164
  - Density: 138.99/km^{2} (359.99/sq mi)
  - Households: 3,661
- Demonym: Santanian

Economy
  - Income class: 2nd municipal income class
  - Poverty incidence: 3.93% (2023)
  - Revenue: ₱ 251 million (2024)
  - Assets: ₱ 987.6 million (2024)
  - Expenditure: ₱ 128.7 million (2024)
  - Liabilities: ₱ 26.83 million (2024)

Service provider
  - Electricity: Ilocos Sur Electric Cooperative (ISECO)
- Time zone: UTC+8 (PST)
- ZIP code: 2703
- PSGC: 0102922000
- IDD : area code: +63 (0)77
- Native languages: Ilocano; Tagalog
- Website: www.lgusanta.org

Santa, officially the Municipality of Santa (Ilocano: Ili ti Santa; Filipino: Bayan ng Santa), is a municipality in the province of Ilocos Sur, Philippines. According to the 2024 census, it has a population of 15,164 people.

Owing to Santa's natural topography (the ridge of Mount Tetas de Santa to the east; the winding Abra River and delta to the north and northwest; and the South China Sea to the west), then Governor-General of the Philippines Theodore Roosevelt Jr. on his visit in 1925 exclaimed: “The mountain in the east, the winding roping river in the north, and the immense sea in the west make Santa a poetic town.”

== Etymology ==
These are the probable origins of the municipality's name.

1. A popular lore tells us that when the scribe of the Spanish explorers was naming the places where they already established settlements, the scribe had a difficult time of thinking of a Catholic saint's name for the place (Santa Catalina, Santa Lucia, and Santa María were already taken), so the town was simply named "Santa." Some versions of the story say the scribe fell asleep or was drunk when he was writing a name for the town and just wrote "Santa".
2. The municipality of Santa was formerly called Santa Catalina de Alejandría, Virgen y Mártir, after the town's patron saint, Catherine of Alexandria. According to folk stories, after the devastation of the town by the 1852 flood (Layos Bungsot), the name was shortened to Santa Catalina de Alejandría. The present name "Santa" came to be after the 1905 flood (Layos Nawnaw), as it was believed changing the name would spare the town from further devastation.

== History ==
=== Foundation of the pueblo ===
According to Augustinian maps from 1831 and 1834, Santa was founded in 1576, with their order established missionary centers in the town after doing so in Vigan in 1575. After the founding of Bantay in 1591 as a pueblo, Santa was made its visita until 1713, when it became an independent vicariate. The town’s prestige grew in 1802 when a provisional diocese was erected and housed in the rectory of Santa until 1834.

=== Malong Revolt ===
The Malong Revolt rocked the town from 1660 to 1661, when Andrés Malong of Binalatongan (now San Carlos City in Pangasinan) rose in arms to protest the abusive exacting of tribute and conscription of men for polo y servicio (forced labour). Malong proclaimed himself “King of Pangasinan” and tried to extend his kingdom by sending his Count, Pedro Gumapos, to Ilocos.

Gumapos pursued retreating Spaniards who had sought refuge in Agoo (now in La Union). The Spaniards and their loyalists made their last stand in Pideg, Santa. Pedro de la Peña, who was defending Pideg Pass, sheltered the great number of the rebels who camped in nearby Narvacan and offered them free passage across Pideg Pass.

=== Diego Silang revolt ===
On December 14, 1762, Diego Silang led the caillianes (commoners or townsfolk) in the most obstinate insurrection against Spain in the 18th century. He crystallized the discontent of the caillianes caused by the imposition of tribute and forced labour, proclaiming a “Free Ilocos” with Vigan as its capital.

When the Spaniards failed to stop Silang in combat, his trusted friends Miguel Vicos and Pedro Becbec shot him in the back on May 26, 1763. Silang’s widow Gabriela, with the help of her uncle Nicolás Cariño, continued her husband's fight and defeated the Spaniards and their soldiers in the Battle of Banaoang in Santa on August 24, 1763.

=== Destructive floods ===
A destructive flood called Layos Bungsot (Ilocano, "Flood of Rotting") of 1852 eroded the first población founded in 1576, causing the town center to move about 4 kilometres (2.5 mi) south. Fr. Pedro Torrices began construction on the new church in 1849-1855 and Fr. Luis Lagar finished it in 1875.

St. Catherine of Alexandria Parish Church, located within the new población

In 1905, another destructive flood, Layos Nawnaw (literally, "Dissolving Flood") motivated the people to transfer the población to Pasungol in the southern part of the town in 1907. Don Domingo Bueno y Ramírez, the presidente municipal (town mayor), transferred the government, and a new población was laid out. Circumferential roads were laid out in the shape of a spider web with the town plaza in the middle. An hermita made of bamboo and cogon grass was built, as was a one-storey primary school building.

=== American colonial period ===
The guerrilla activities of Gen. Manuel Tinio dominated the Philippine–American War in Ilocos. The civil government of Ilocos Sur began to function in 1899 with Don Mena Crisólogo, the former Ilocos Sur delegate to the Malolos Congress, as the first Civil Governor.

=== World War II and thereafter ===
On December 19, 1941, the Imperial Japanese Army landed in Santa as part of their occupation of the Philippines. The people fled to the mountains where they suffered from privations, hunger and diseases. The invading Japanese soldiers held a garrison at the south of Quirino Bridge and massacred 70 civilians in Barrio Rizal on January 26, 1945.

In 1945, Filipino forces of the 121st Infantry Regiment, Philippine Commonwealth Army, USAFIP-NL liberated the town and defeated the Japanese Imperial forces at the end of World War II. Upon the return of the Commonwealth Government, President Sergio Osmeña appointed Sixto Brillantes after being elected as assemblyman of the second district of Ilocos Sur.

== Geography ==
The Municipality of Santa is triangular shape. Its northern border, forming the baseline of the triangular land and running in the east–west direction, follow the ever-changing course of the Abra River from the Banaoang Gap in the north-east corner of the town to the sea for about 18 kilometres (11 mi). Some islands of the river delta are settled by the people of Santa. The largest island, Barangay Rancho, is connected by a bridge to the main town. Another island occupied by Brgys. Dammay and Oribi is only accessible by boat.

It is bordered by the municipality of Bantay to the north, Vigan and Caoayan to the west, San Quintin, Abra to the east and Narvacan to the south

Santa is situated 20.33 kilometres (12.63 mi) from the provincial capital Vigan, and 384.36 kilometres (238.83 mi) from the country's capital city of Manila. It can be reached by bus, jeepney and other motorized means of transport by way of the National Highway.

Santa has an area of 109.1 square kilometres (42.1 sq mi), which is distributed in twenty-six (26) barangays and constitutes almost 4.2% of the entire area of the province of Ilocos Sur.

=== Barangays ===
Santa is politically subdivided into 26 barangays. Each barangay consists of puroks and some have sitios.

- Ampandula
- Banaoang
- Basug
- Bucalag
- Cabangaran
- Calungboyan
- Casiber
- Dammay
- Labut Norte
- Labut Sur
- Mabilbila Norte
- Mabilbila Sur
- Magsaysay District (Poblacion)
- Manueva
- Marcos (Poblacion)
- Nagpanaoan
- Namalangan
- Oribi
- Pasungol
- Quezon (Poblacion)
- Quirino (Poblacion)
- Rancho
- Rizal
- Sacuyya Norte
- Sacuyya Sur
- Tabucolan

=== Topography ===
The topography of the municipality is undulating to rolling with slope ranging from 0-30%.

==== Soil and vegetation ====
There are three types of soil in Santa, namely: clay loam which is used for crop production, clay on the eastern part of the town and sandy loam on the western part. Although Santa has fair type of soil, vegetative cover is good for rice, corn, vegetables and fruit-bearing trees.

==== Mineral resources ====
Major mineral resources of the municipality are salt from the coast, and gravel and sand washed down the river banks of Abra River. Gravel and sand are gathered along the river bank and sold for construction. Salt-making is found along the coastal barangays of Santa with some of the residents engaged in the industry as their means of livelihood.

==== Natural and man-made risk areas ====
Because of its location, Santa has been plagued by disasters and calamities since the Spanish Colonial Period (See Destructive flooding below). During heavy rains, large amount of water coming down from the Central Cordillera Mountains flows down to the sea through the Abra River, the sixth largest river system in the Philippines, devastating Santa which traverses the western part of the municipality. Flood prone areas in the western part of the town include Barangays Pasungol, Tabucolan, Calungboyan, Casiber, Rancho, Oribi and Dammay. Even places located at the foot of the mountain are also prone to flash floods because of the denuded mountain east of the town. During the typhoon of June 5, 1999, the storm surge devastated Santa destroying residences along the coastal barangays.

=== Climate ===
Climate data for Santa, Ilocos Sur
Month	Jan	Feb	Mar	Apr	May	Jun	Jul	Aug	Sep	Oct	Nov	Dec	Year
Mean daily maximum °C (°F)	30 (86)	31 (88)	33 (91)	34 (93)	32 (90)	31 (88)	30 (86)	30 (86)	30 (86)	31 (88)	31 (88)	30 (86)	31 (88)
Mean daily minimum °C (°F)	19 (66)	20 (68)	21 (70)	23 (73)	25 (77)	25 (77)	25 (77)	25 (77)	24 (75)	22 (72)	21 (70)	20 (68)	23 (73)
Average precipitation mm (inches)	10 (0.4)	10 (0.4)	14 (0.6)	23 (0.9)	80 (3.1)	103 (4.1)	121 (4.8)	111 (4.4)	119 (4.7)	144 (5.7)	39 (1.5)	15 (0.6)	789 (31.2)
Average rainy days	5.2	3.9	6.2	9.1	18.5	21.4	22.9	19.8	19.8	16.2	10.5	6.1	159.6
Source: Meteoblue (modeled/calculated data, not measured locally)

The type of climate in Santa is generally the same as the climate of all coastal towns of Ilocos Sur. There are two seasons in the region, wet and dry season. The dry season commences in the month of February and ends in the month of June while the wet season is during the rest of the year.

The Philippine Atmospheric, Geophysical and Astronomical Services Administration (PAGASA) data for the municipality gives the annual average temperature at 29 °C (84 °F). April and May were recorded as the hottest months with a temperature from 29 to 31 °C (84 to 88 °F) respectively while the coldest months are January and February with a temperature ranging from 24 to 21 °C (75 to 70 °F).

During the rainy season, Santa experience more or less 20 typhoons a year. Rainfall record of Santa is the same as the records of other municipalities of Ilocos Sur. Average monthly average during the wet season is estimated at 213 millimetres (8.4 in).

== Demographics ==
Population census of Santa

Year	Pop.	±% p.a.
1903	8,063	—
1918	9,748	+1.27%
1939	10,174	+0.20%
1948	8,917	−1.45%
1960	10,214	+1.14%
1970	10,859	+0.61%

Year	Pop.	±% p.a.
1975	11,799	+1.68%
1980	11,359	−0.76%
1990	12,570	+1.02%
1995	12,801	+0.34%
2000	13,918	+1.81%
2007	14,059	+0.14%

Year	Pop.	±% p.a.
2010	15,106	+2.65%
2015	15,340	+0.29%
2020	14,992	−0.48%
2024	15,164	+0.27%

Source: Philippine Statistics Authority

In the 2024 census, Santa had a population of 15,164 people. The population density was 140 inhabitants per square kilometre (360/sq mi).

=== Language ===
Ilocano is the predominant dialect of Santa.

== Economy ==
Poverty incidence of Santa (%)

Source: Philippine Statistics Authority

Santa is home to a blacksmithing (panagpanday) industry dating to the Spanish colonial period. The wrought iron and steel products are listed as the town's One Town, One Product (OTOP).

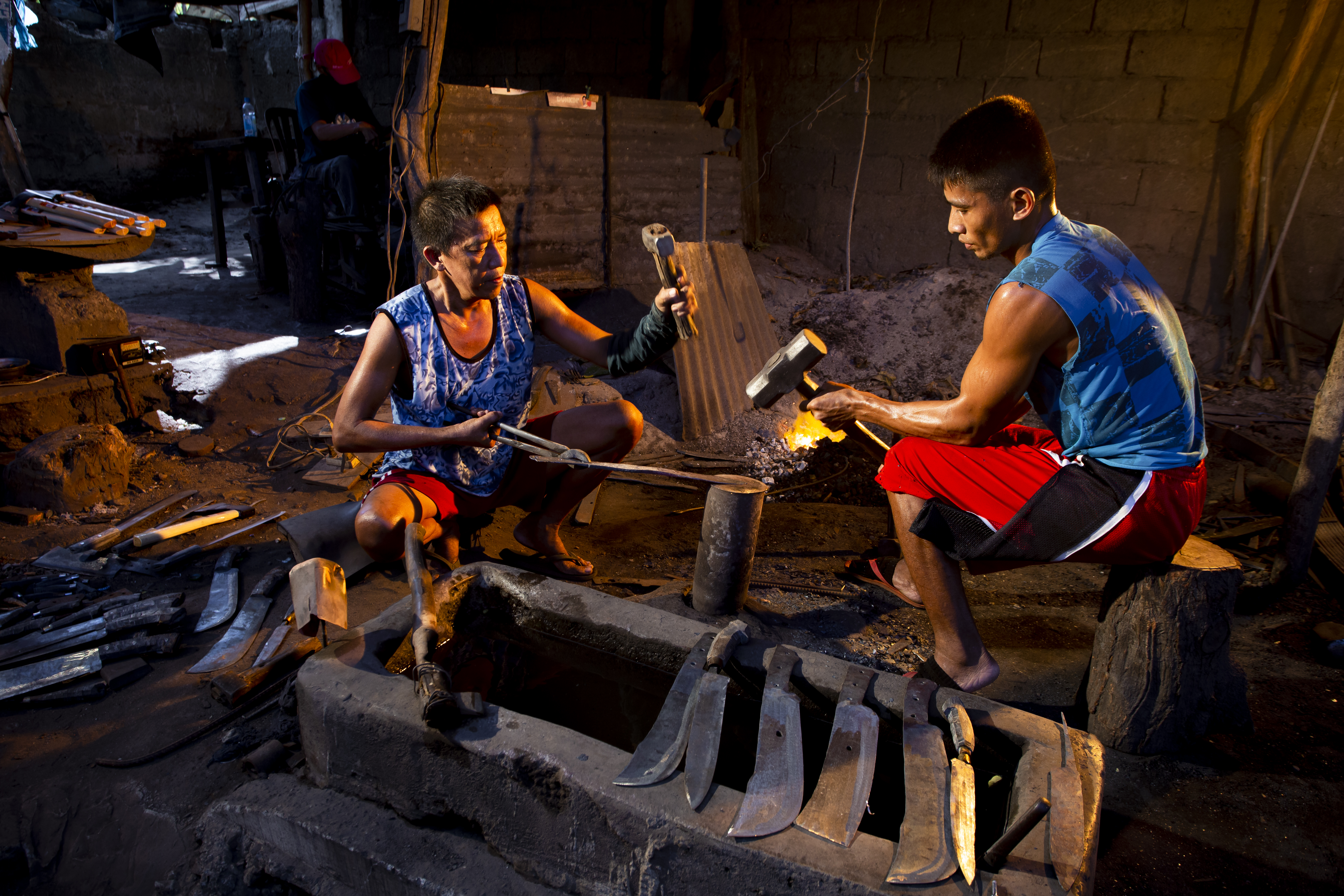
Blacksmithing at Sacuyya

Bolo knife products

== Government ==
=== Local government ===
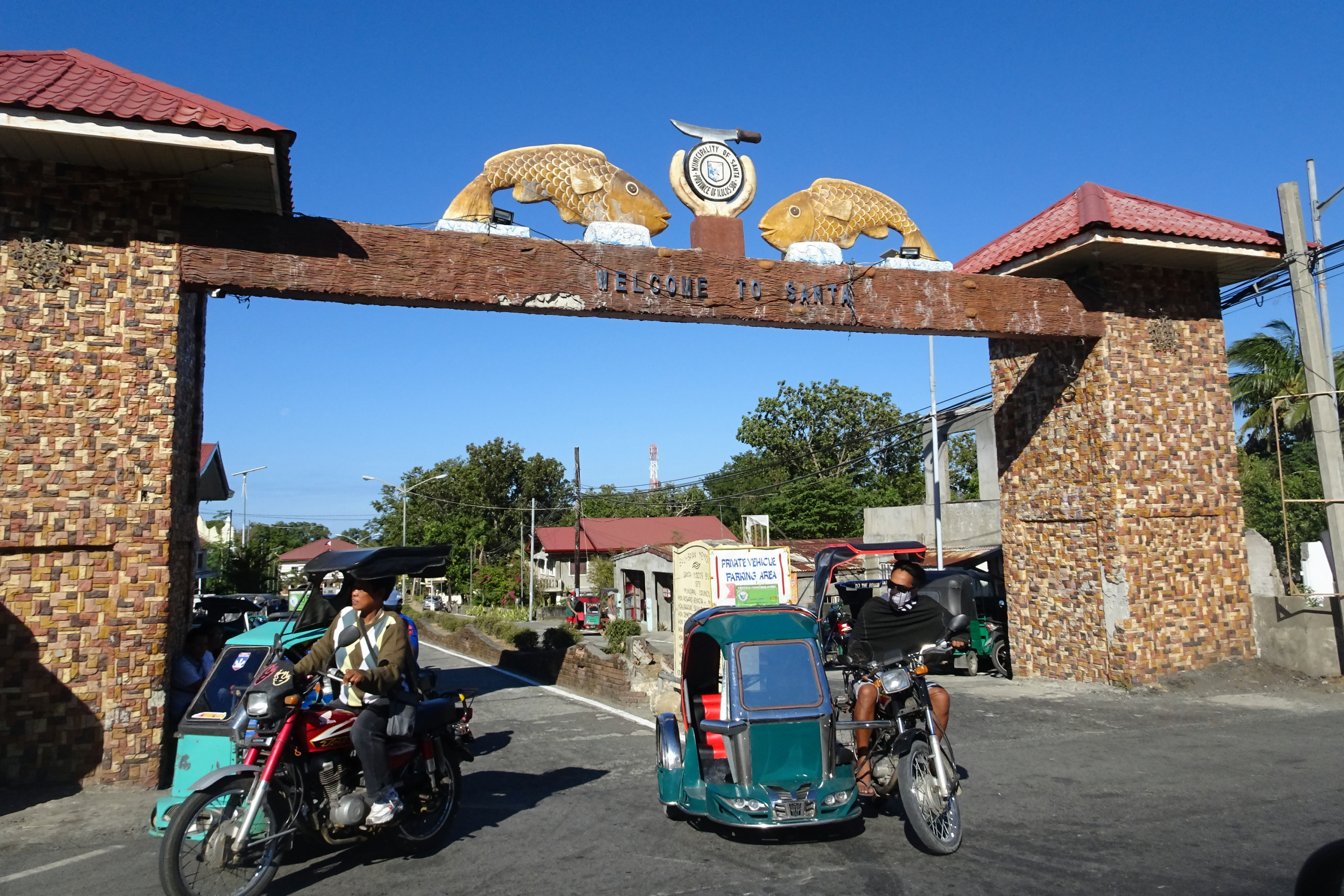
Welcome arch at town center

Santa, belonging to the second congressional district of the province of Ilocos Sur, is governed by a mayor designated as its local chief executive and by a municipal council as its legislative body in accordance with the Local Government Code. The mayor, vice mayor, and the councilors are elected directly by the people through an election which is being held every three years.

=== Elected officials ===
Members of the Municipal Council (2019–2022)
Position	Name
Congressman	Kristine Singson-Meehan
Mayor	Jesus B. Bueno Jr.
Vice-Mayor	Jeremy Jesus D. Bueno III
Councilors	Eugene B. Borje
Councilors	Lorenzo Q. Formoso Jr.
Councilors	Domingo L. Ritua
Councilors	Bella G. Bello
Councilors	Benedicto A. Burgonio
Councilors	Marino S. Burgos
Councilors	Encarnita B. dela Cueva
Councilors	Reynold B. Queral

== Tourism ==
The Abra River in 2022, with the new Quirino Bridge (foreground) and old Quirino Bridge (background)

=== Banaoang Gap ===
The Banaoang Gap is a water gap about 9 kilometres (5.6 mi) long formed by the Abra River by cutting three consecutive tall mountain ridges in the Ilocos Range. It separates Santa and Bantay towns and stretches to San Quintin, Abra. The gap is spanned by the old and new Quirino Bridges connecting the two towns. A viewing deck is located in Barangay Banaoang in Santa offering dramatic view of the bridge and the broad Abra River backdropped by Mount Tetas de Santa, Mount Binitalo and the other mountains in the Ilocos Range.

=== Northern Luzon Heroes Hill National Park ===
Located southeast of Santa and partly in Narvacan, Ilocos Sur, the Northern Heroes Hill National Park was established on July 9, 1963, by Proclamation No. 132 encompassing 1,316 hectares (3,250 acres) of beautiful mountain scenery.

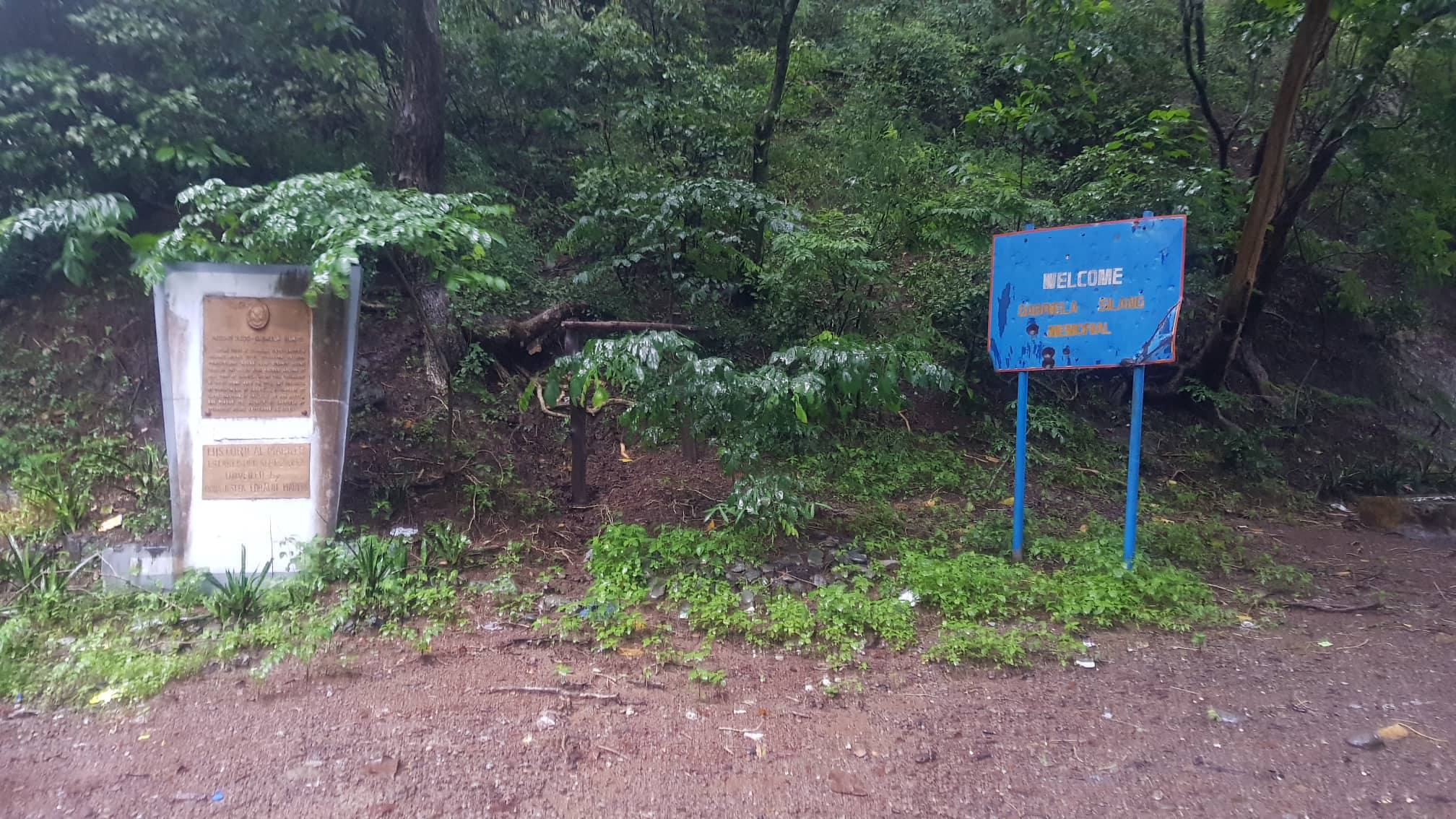
Pasong Diego–Gabriela Silang historical marker

=== Gabriela Silang Memorial Park ===
Located west of the national park along the National Highway is the Old Pideg Pass, the historic gateway to Santa, renamed Diego-Gabriela Silang Pass in 1976. The Gabriela Silang Memorial Park was erected here dedicated to Gabriela who was born in the old barrio of Caniogan in Santa on March 19, 1731, and is regarded as the first heroine of Ilocos.

== Education ==
The Santa Schools District governs all public and private education system within the municipality.

=== Primary and elementary schools ===
- Banaoang Community School
- Basug Elementary School
- Bucalag-Tabucolan Elementary School
- Calungboyan Elementary School
- Dammay Elementary School
- Nagpanaoan Community Schoo
- Rancho Community School
- Sacuyya Elementary School
- Santa Central School

=== Secondary schools ===
- Basug National High School
- Mabilbila Integrated School
- Rancho National High School
- Santa High School
