= Pura Sumangil =

Filipino nun and social activist (born 1941)

Puraperla dela Cruz Sumangil (born 1941), better known as Pura Sumangil, is a Filipino Catholic nun, educator, and social activist. She is a co-founder of Concerned Citizens of Abra for Good Governance, a non-governmental organization focused on participatory monitoring of infrastructure projects in the Cordillera Administrative Region in northern Philippines.

In 2022, she received the Pro Ecclesia et Pontifice award from the Holy See. She was also nominated for the 2005 Nobel Peace Prize.

== Early life and education ==
Sumangil was born in 1941 in Nueva Ecija province, and moved to Bangued, Abra province in 1970 to become an Auxiliary under the local Bishop, where she has since remained.

She obtained her bachelor's degree in education at Divine Word College of Bangued as well as a master's degree in development management from the Asian Institute of Management. She was also nominated for the 2005 Nobel Peace Prize.

A Catholic nun, she belongs to the Auxiliaries of the Apostolate.

== Recognition ==
Her work has been recognized through numerous accolades, including the following:

- Aurora Aragon Quezon Peace Award, in 1997
- Most Active NGO Chairperson from ARYA ABRA Foundation
- Pro Ecclesia et Pontifice, in 2022
