= Abra River =

7th largest river system in the Philippines

Abra River Lagben River
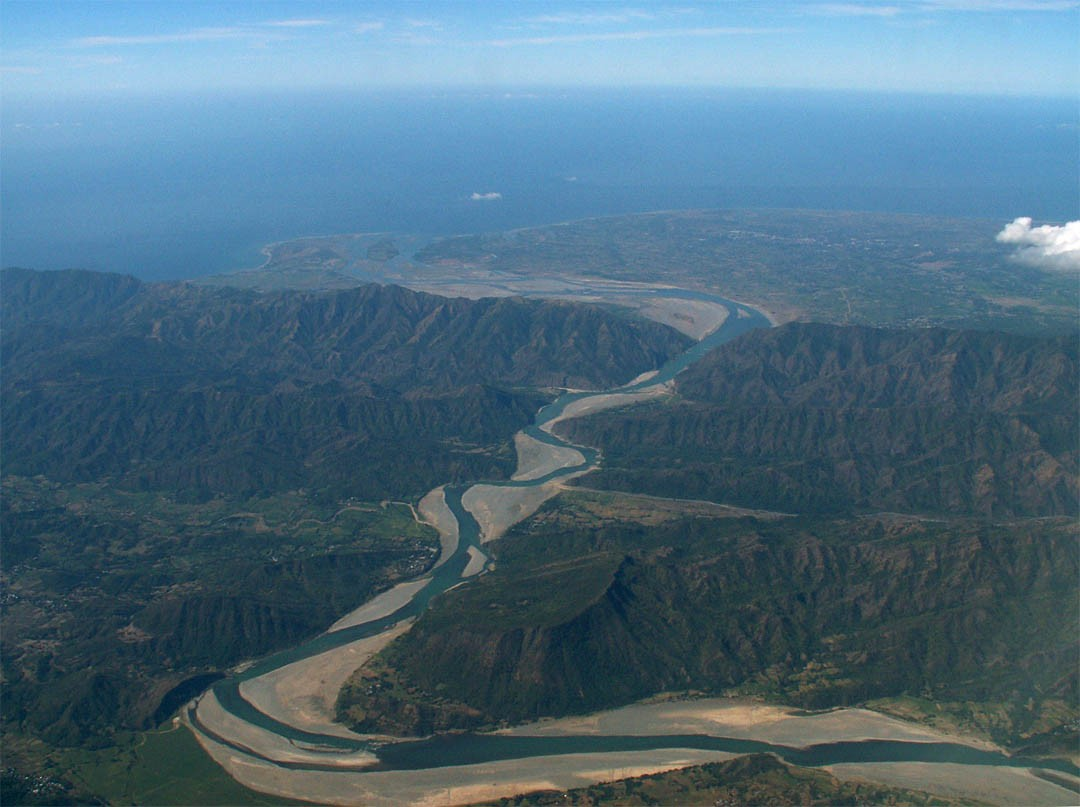

- Abra River mouth Abra River (Philippines)

Location
- Country: Philippines
- Region: Cordillera Administrative Region; Ilocos Region
- Province: Abra; Ilocos Sur; Benguet

Physical characteristics
- Source: Mount Data
  - location: Benguet, Cordillera Administrative Region
  - elevation: 2,310 m (7,580 ft)
- Mouth: South China Sea
  - location: Caoayan, Ilocos Sur
  - coordinates: 17°30′47″N 120°23′45″E
  - elevation: 0 m (0 ft)
- Length: 206 km (128 mi)
- Basin size: 5,125 km^{2} (1,979 sq mi)
- Discharge
  - average: 350 m^{3}/s (12,000 cu ft/s)

Basin features
- Tributaries
  - right: Tineg River

The Abra River, also called Lagben River, is the seventh largest river system in the Philippines in terms of watershed size. It has an estimated drainage area of 5,125 square kilometres (1,979 sq mi) and a length of 179 kilometres (111 mi) from its source near Mount Data in Benguet province.

== History ==
In 1823, an Augustinian priest, Fr. Bernardo Lago arrived on the town of Pidigan, where he built a church and a rectory atop a hill near the river, marking the official start of Catholicism in Abra.

In 2022, the Abra River Fault, which runs along the river, triggered a magnitude 7.0 earthquake in Abra.

== Geography ==
The Abra River originates in the southern section of Mount Data. It descends westward to Cervantes, Ilocos Sur, and flows into Abra. At a point near the municipality of Dolores, it is joined by the Tineg River, which originates in the uplands of Abra. There are also other small rivers like the Binongan River, Ikmin River, and other rivers connecting to Abra River.

== Crossings ==
Old Quirino Bridge

This is listed from mouth to source.

1. Quirino Bridge ( N2 (MacArthur Highway), Santa–Bantay boundary, Ilocos Sur)
2. Old Quirino (Banaoang) Bridge (Santa–Bantay boundary, Ilocos Sur)
3. Calaba Bridge (Ilocos Norte–Abra Road, Bangued)
4. Don Mariano Marcos Bridge (Abra–Kalinga Road, Tayum–Dolores boundary)
5. Sto. Tomas Bridge (Manabo, Abra)
6. Aluling Bridge (Tagudin–Cervantes–Sabangan Road (Cervantes)
7. Cervantes–Mankayan–Abatan Road (Cervantes, Ilocos Sur)
