= Manleluag Spring Protected Landscape =

Protected area in Pangasinan, Philippines

- IUCN category V (protected landscape/seascape)
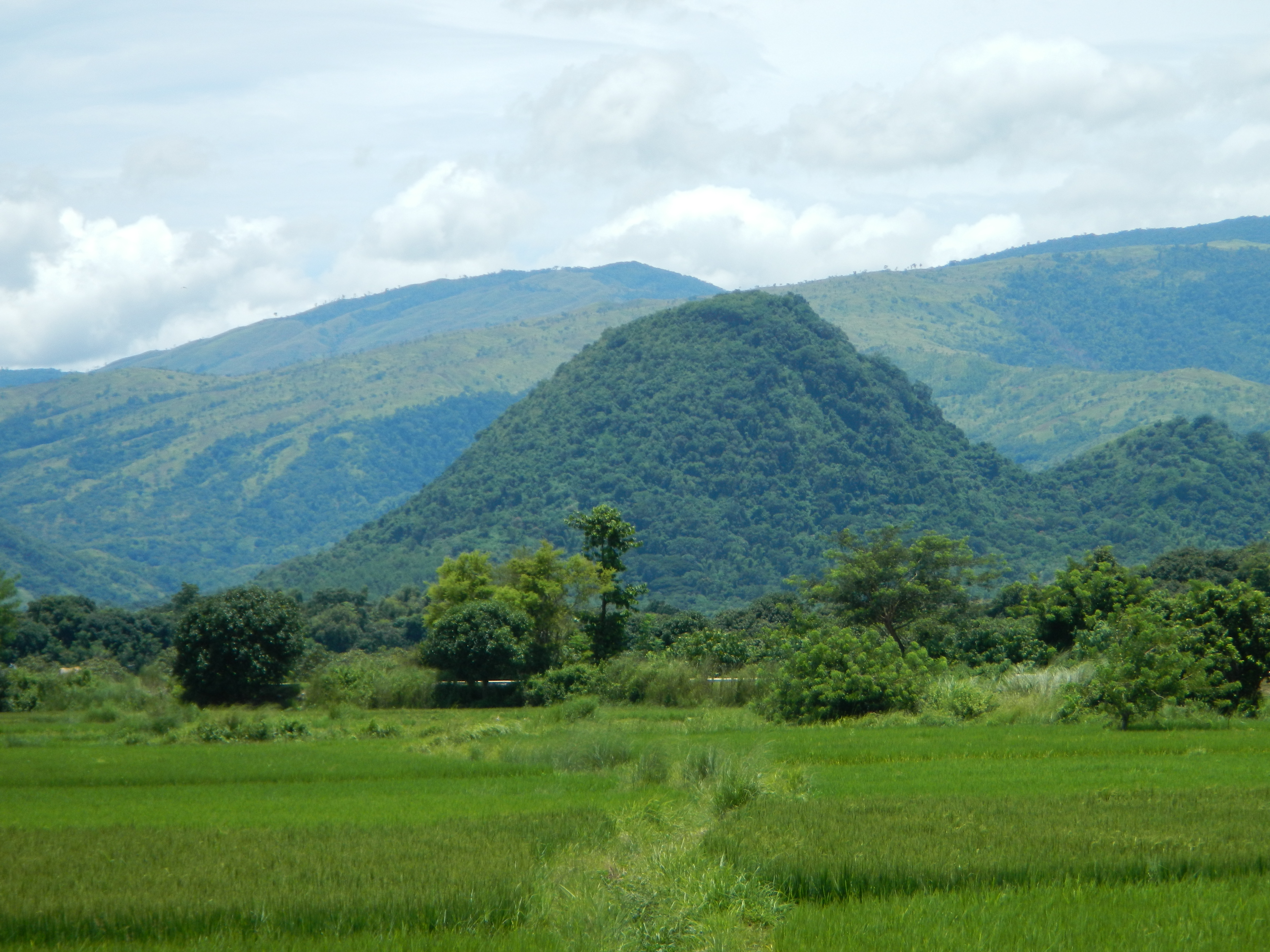
- Mount Malabobo in the Manleluag Spring Protected Landscape

- Location within Luzon Location within Philippines
- Location: Pangasinan, Philippines
- Nearest city: San Carlos
- Coordinates: 15°42′11″N 120°16′57″E
- Area: 1,935.17 hectares (4,781.9 acres)
- Established: February 17, 1934 (Forest reserve); September 3, 1940 (National park); March 10, 2004 (Protected landscape)
- Governing body: Department of Environment and Natural Resources

The Manleluag Spring Protected Landscape is a protected area containing natural hot springs in the Ilocos Region of the Philippines. It is one of 34 protected landscapes in the Philippines located in the municipality of Mangatarem, Pangasinan in the west-central area of the island of Luzon.

== History ==
It was originally established in 1934 as the Manleluag Spring Forest Reserve covering approximately 58.8 hectares (145 acres) through Proclamation No. 659 signed by Governor-General Frank Murphy. The boundaries of the reserve were delineated with reference to an alibanbang tree which was 35 cm (14 in) in diameter at the time. In 1939, the adjoining 32.9-hectare (81-acre) public forest was added to the reserve and on 3 September 1940, through President Manuel Luis Quezon's Proclamation No. 612, it was re-designated as a national park occupying an area of approximately 91.7 hectares (227 acres).

The park was converted into a protected landscape area on March 10, 2004, through Proclamation No. 576 signed by President Gloria Macapagal-Arroyo; it now has a total area of 1,935.17 hectares (4,781.9 acres) and a buffer zone area of 965.09 hectares (2,384.8 acres). It is one of only two protected areas in Pangasinan, the other being the Hundred Islands National Park.

== Description ==
Manleluag spring is a set of two ophiolitic hot springs, near the 923-foot (281 m)-tall extinct volcano Mount Malabobo, and is located in the rural barangay of Malabobo in Mangatarem municipality, some 180 kilometres (110 mi) north from Manila. It is part of the Mangatarem forest which straddles the provinces of Pangasinan, Zambales and Tarlac in the Zambales Mountain Range. The area has low to rolling and moderately steep slopes with an average elevation of 1,033 feet (315 m). The park is crossed by two rivers, the Baracbac and Basican rivers.

Of the 1,935 hectares of the park's total area, 412.5 ha. are reserved for wildlife habitat, 539.46 ha. for sustainable uses, 57.34 ha. for multiple uses, 15.7 ha. for restoration, and 91.7 ha. for recreation. A series of pathways and foot trails provide access to areas around the park which is surrounded by patrol trails and fire lines in the buffer area for forest fire protection purposes.

== Biodiversity ==
The protected landscape is an important biodiversity area. It is home to over 90 bird species, including the Philippine frogmouth, rufous hornbill, Philippine hanging parrot, Philippine duck, flame-breasted fruit dove, coleto, malkoha, and ashy thrush. Its forest also supports the Philippine deer, wild boar, cloud rat, Philippine warty pig, and reptiles like the water monitor.
