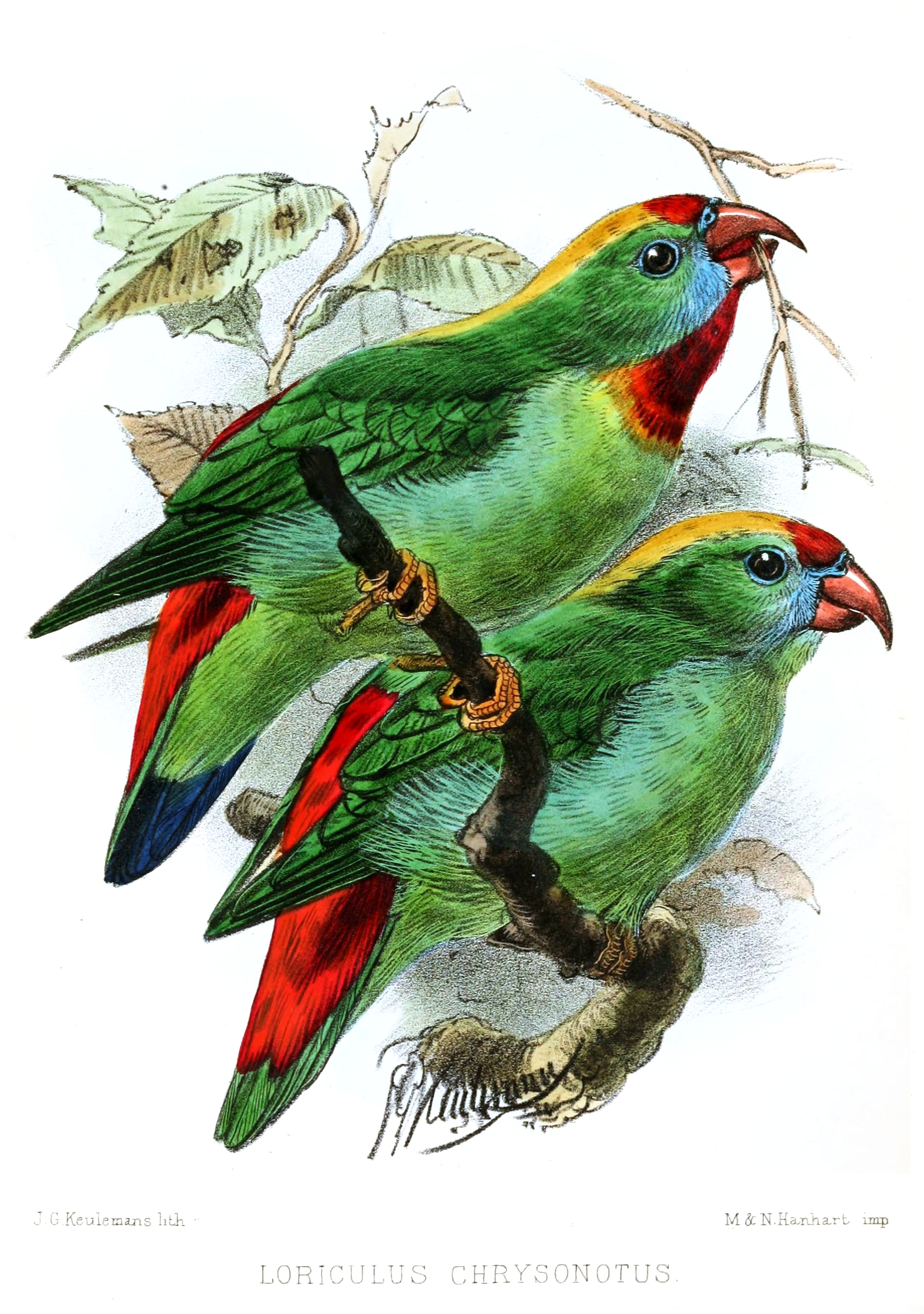
- Illustration by J. G. Keulemans

Scientific classification
- Domain: Eukaryota
- Kingdom: Animalia
- Phylum: Chordata
- Class: Aves
- Order: Psittaciformes
- Family: Psittaculidae
- Genus: Loriculus
- Species: L. philippensis
- Subspecies: L. p. chrysonotus

Trinomial name
- Loriculus philippensis chrysonotus Sclater, 1872

= Cebu hanging parrot =

Subspecies of bird

The Cebu hanging parrot (Loriculus philippensis chrysonotus) is a subspecies of the Philippine hanging parrot found only on the island of Cebu, Philippines. This subspecies was generally believed to be extinct until an expedition led by the Department of Environment and Natural Resources (Cebu) claimed to have seen and captured a tiny bird in thick foliage in the remote part of central Cebu. The bird has a distinctive scarlet tail with faint patches of red on its head. Females lack the red throat and breast patch, as opposed to males. The nape and upper back are green-tinged and only lightly golden-yellow. They have a high-pitched, whistle-like sound. The bird measures 14 cm (5.5 in) long with a wingspan of 18 cm (7 in).
