= Mangatarem =

Municipality in Pangasinan, Philippines

- Municipality
- Municipality of Mangatarem
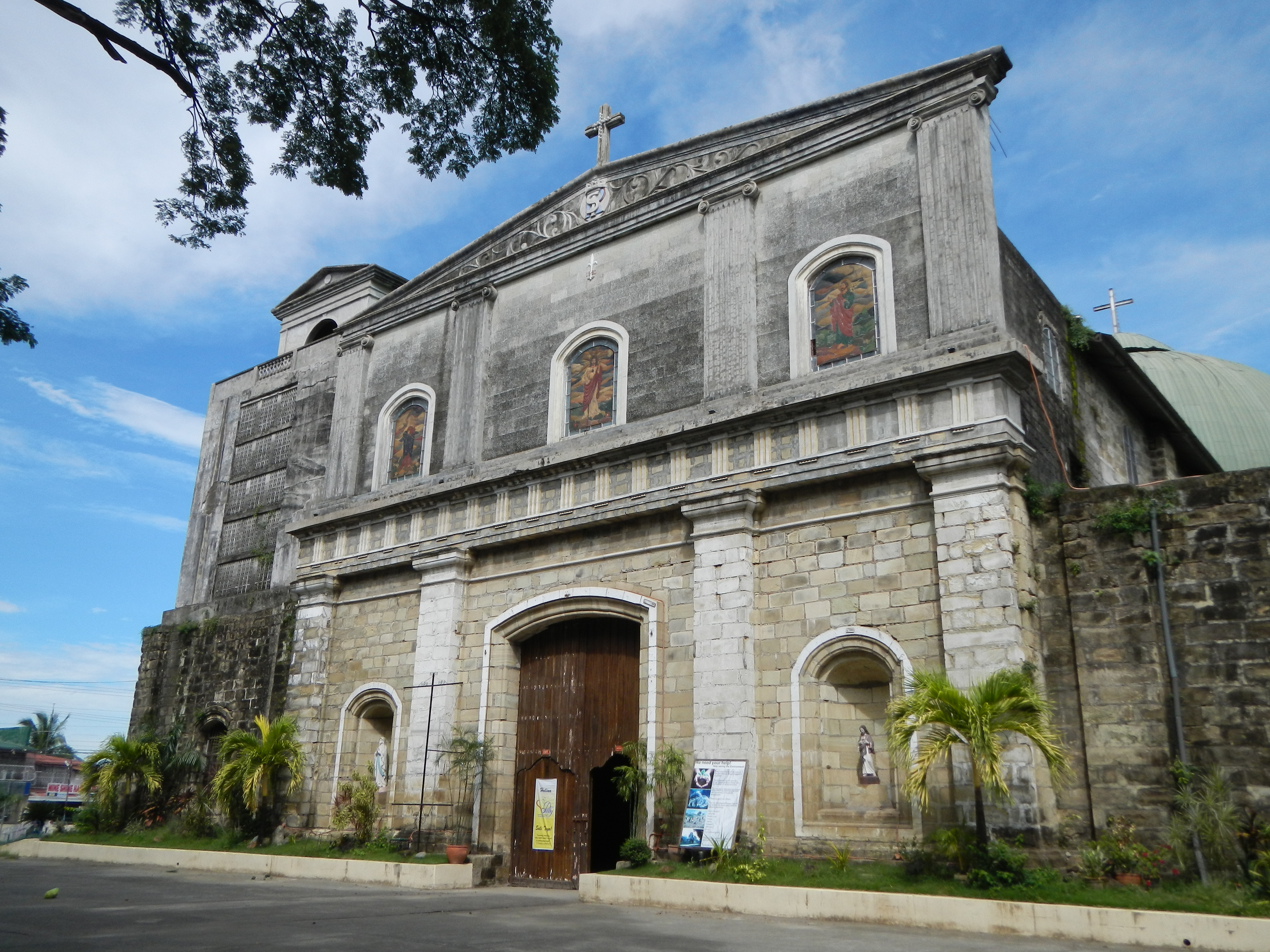
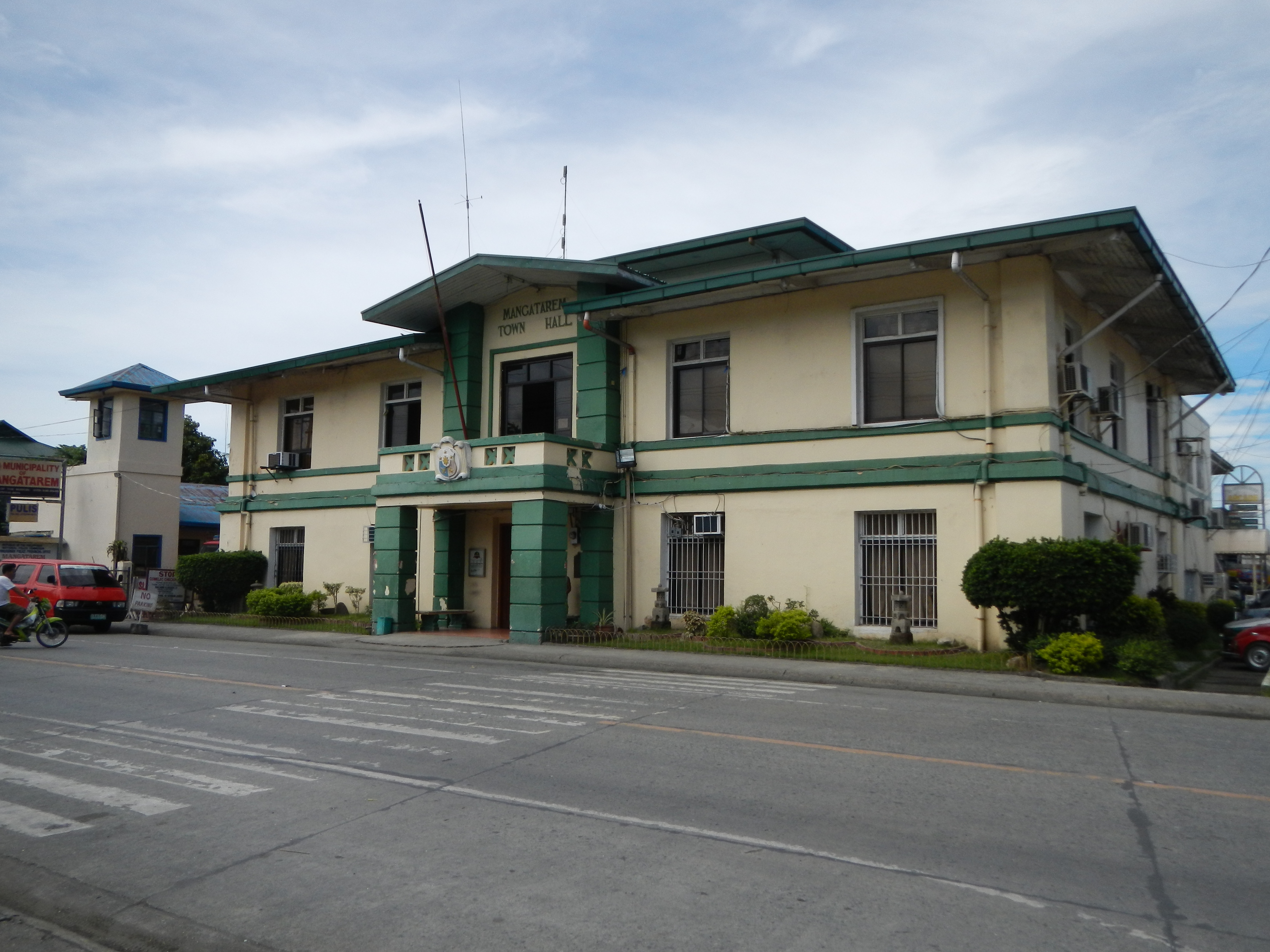
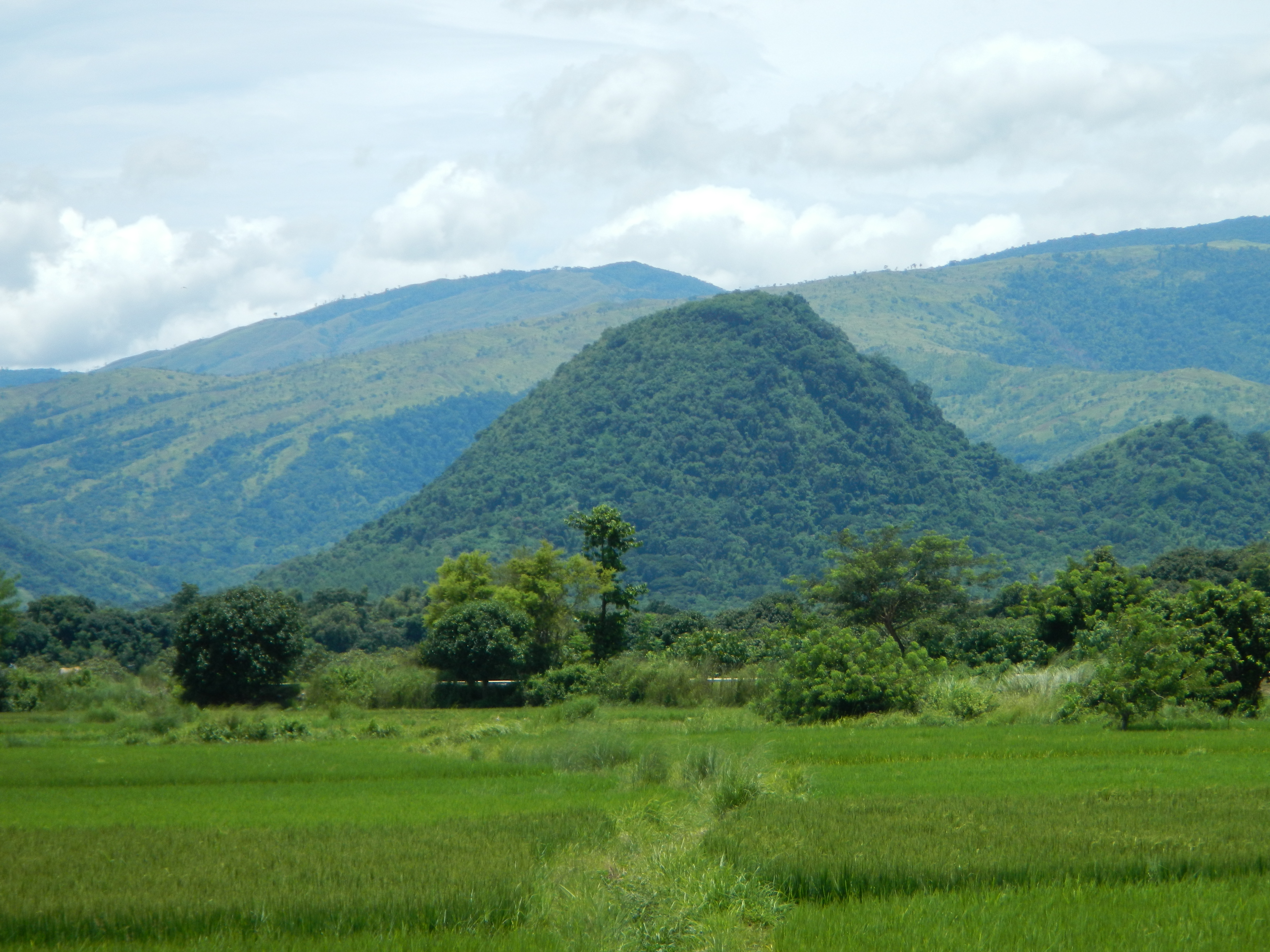
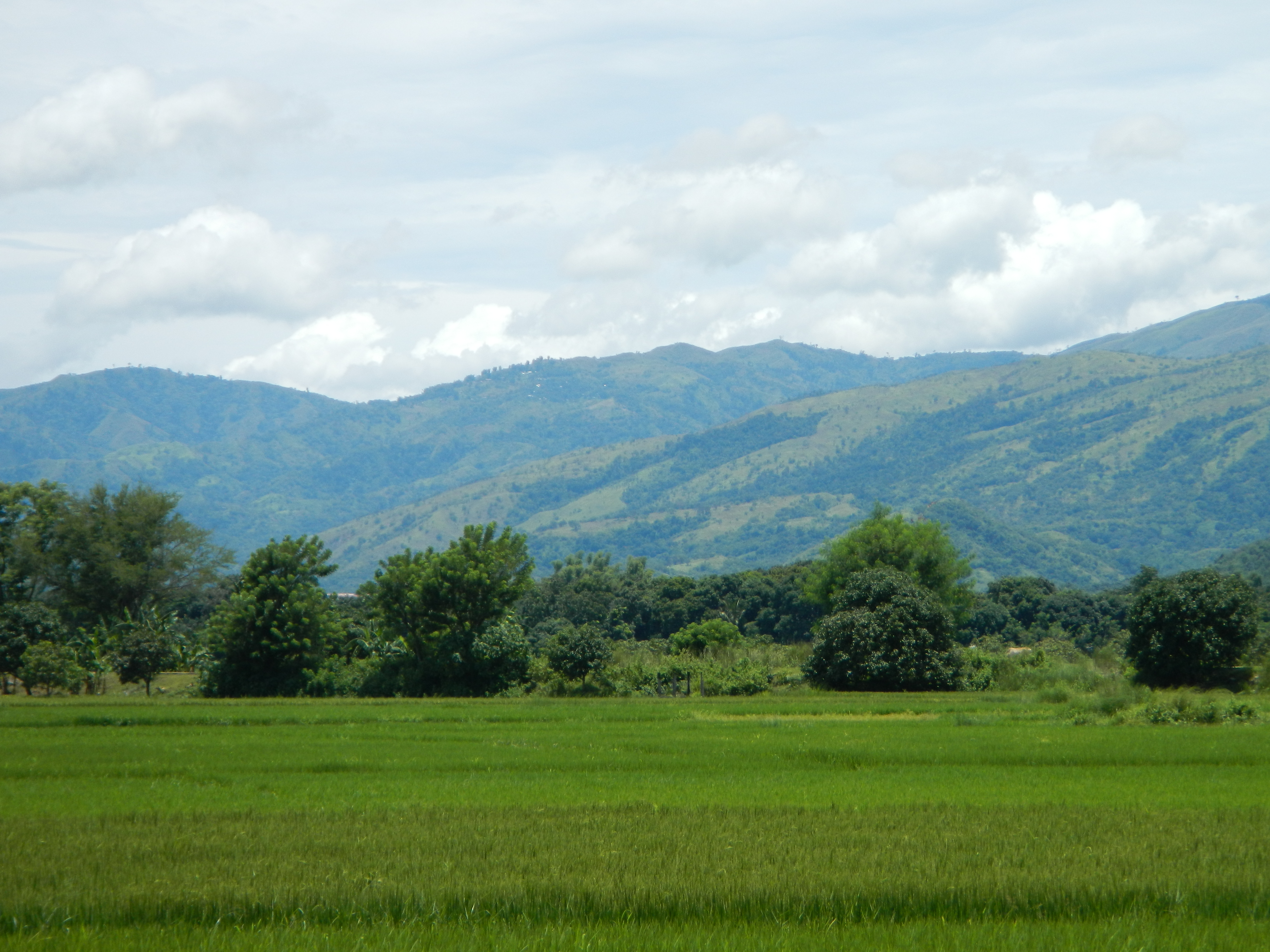
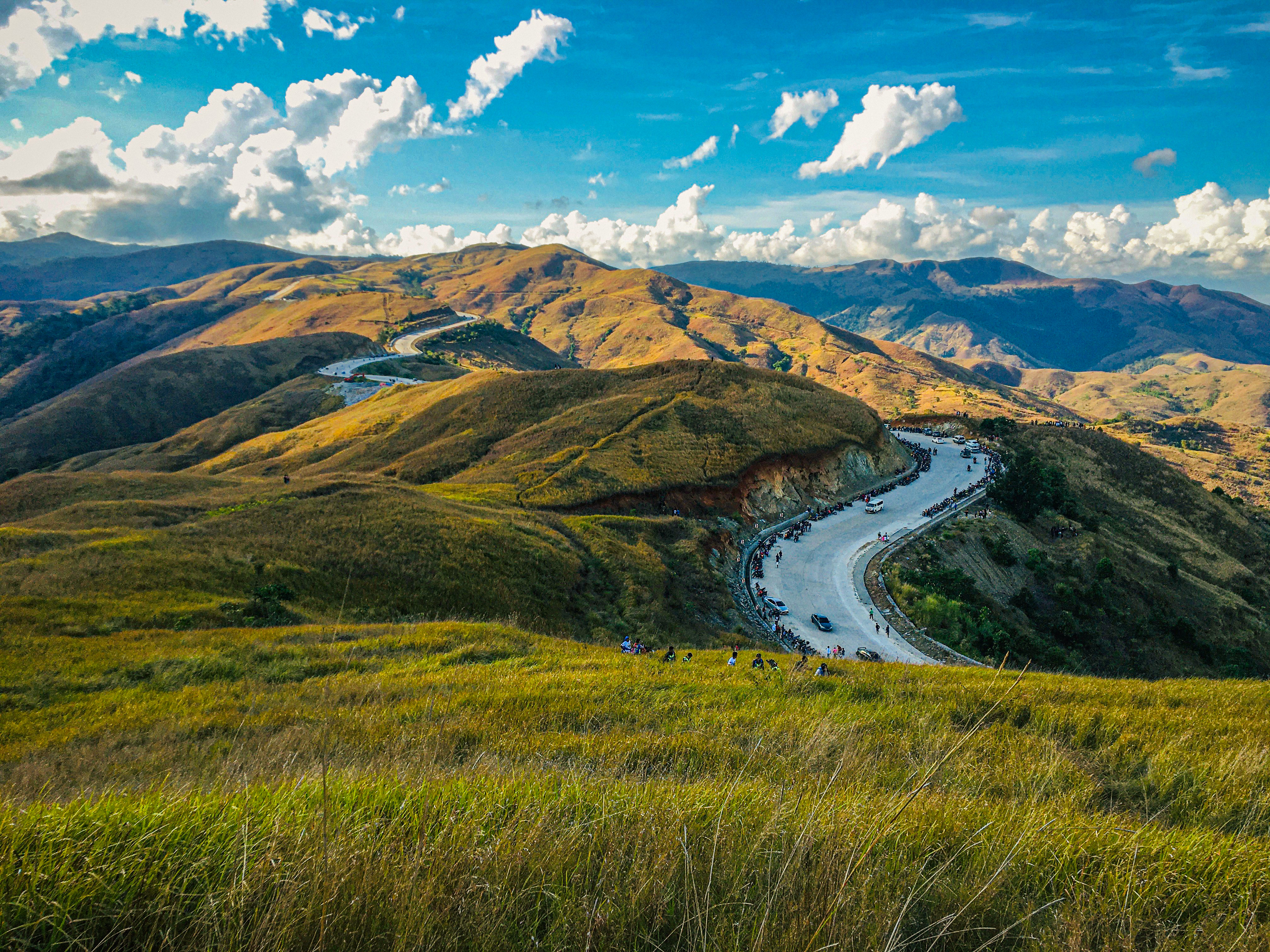
- Clockwise from top: Saint Raymond of Peñafort Parish; Mount Malabobo; Daang Kalikasan; Manleluag Spring Protected Landscape; and Mangatarem Municipal Hall.

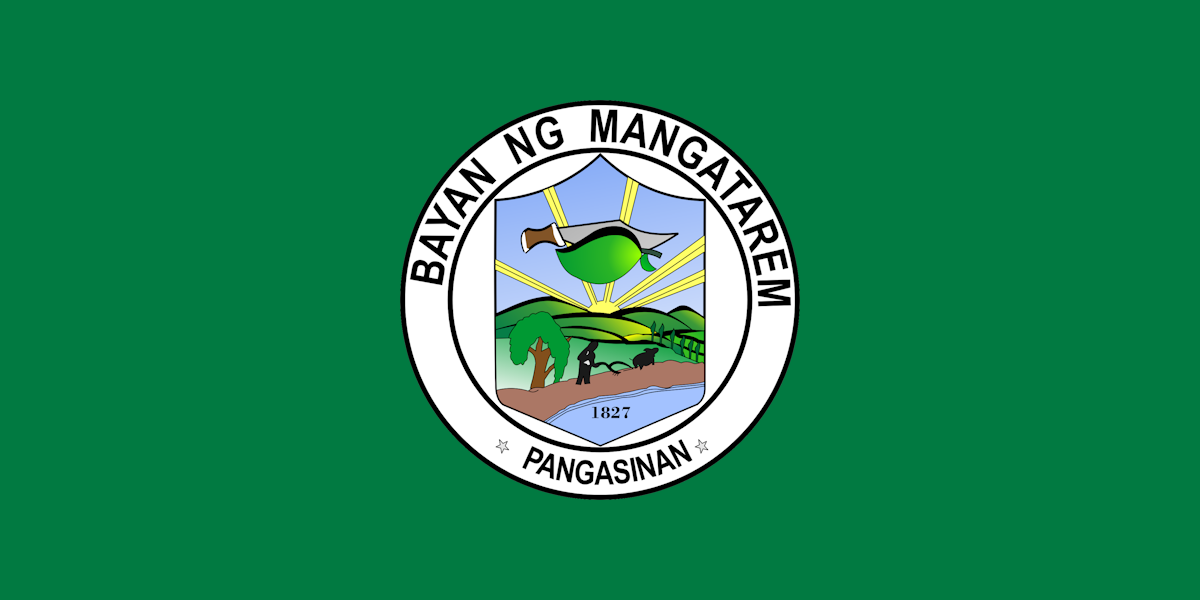
- Flag Seal
- Etymology: lit. Mango Orchard
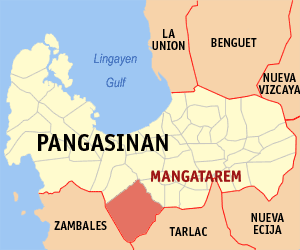
- Map of Pangasinan with Mangatarem highlighted
- Interactive map of Mangatarem
- Location within the Philippines
- Coordinates: 15°47′15″N 120°17′32″E
- Country: Philippines
- Region: Ilocos Region
- Province: Pangasinan
- District: 2nd district
- Founded: 1837
- Barangays: 82 (see Barangays)

Government
  - Type: Sangguniang Bayan
  - Mayor: Jessen Francisco Viray-Ventenilla
  - Vice Mayor: Michael Mon R. Punzal
  - Representative: Mark Oppen Cojuangco
  - Municipal Council: Members: Napoleon A. Calicdan III; Ricardo B. Pastor Jr.; Napoleon Q. Petaca; Cesar M. Cabornay; Philip Theodore E. Cruz; Joel M. Cruz; Conrado T. Budiao; Ryan A. Sanchez
  - Electorate: 56,016 voters (2025)

Area
  - Total: 317.50 km^{2} (122.59 sq mi)
- Elevation: 29 m (95 ft)
- Highest elevation: 291 m (955 ft)
- Lowest elevation: 8 m (26 ft)

Population (2024 census)
  - Total: 79,648
  - Density: 250.86/km^{2} (649.72/sq mi)
  - Households: 19,840

Economy
  - Income class: 1st municipal income class
  - Poverty incidence: 13.96% (2023)
  - Revenue: ₱ 357.3 million (2024)
  - Assets: ₱ 1,125 million (2024)
  - Expenditure: ₱ 319.1 million (2024)
  - Liabilities: ₱ 160.9 million (2024)

Service provider
  - Electricity: Central Pangasinan Electric Cooperative (CENPELCO)
- Time zone: UTC+8 (PST)
- ZIP code: 2413
- PSGC: 0105527000
- IDD : area code: +63 (0)75
- Native languages: Pangasinan; Ilocano; Tagalog

Mangatarem, officially the Municipality of Mangatarem (Pangasinan: Baley na Mangatarem; Ilocano: Ili ti Mangatarem; Tagalog: Bayan ng Mangatarem), is a municipality in the province of Pangasinan, Philippines. According to the 2024 census, it has a population of 79,648 people.

The municipality is home to the Manleluag Hot Spring Protected Landscape located in Barangay Malabobo near the southern boundary of the municipality.

== Etymology ==
Mangatarem is a Pangasinan word for "mango plantation". The town's name also came from the Ilocano phrase “mangga ken tirem”, which means "mango and oyster".

== History ==
Mangatarem was first established as a visita of San Carlos. It became an independent parish in 1835, with Don Ambrocio Gutierrez as its first gobernadorcillo. The Dominicans accepted the administration of Mangatarem in 1837.

== Geography ==
Mangatarem is situated 29.24 kilometres (18.17 mi) from the provincial capital Lingayen, and 188.06 kilometres (116.86 mi) from the country's capital city of Manila.

=== Barangays ===
Mangatarem is politically subdivided into 82 barangays. Each barangay consists of puroks and some have sitios.

- Andangin
- Arellano Street (Poblacion)
- Bantay
- Bantocaling
- Baracbac
- Peania Pedania (Bedania)
- Bogtong Bolo
- Bogtong Bunao
- Bogtong Centro
- Bogtong Niog
- Bogtong Silag
- Buaya
- Buenlag
- Bueno
- Bunagan
- Bunlalacao
- Burgos Street (Poblacion)
- Cabaluyan 1st
- Cabaluyan 2nd
- Cabarabuan
- Cabaruan
- Cabayaoasan
- Cabayugan
- Cacaoiten
- Calomboyan Norte
- Calomboyan Sur
- Calvo (Poblacion)
- Casilagan
- Catarataraan
- Caturay Norte
- Caturay Sur
- Caviernesan
- Dorongan Ketaket
- Dorongan Linmansangan
- Dorongan Punta
- Dorongan Sawat
- Dorongan Valerio
- General Luna (Poblacion)
- Historia
- Lawak Langka
- Linmansangan
- Lopez (Poblacion)
- Mabini (Poblacion)
- Macarang
- Malabobo
- Malibong
- Malunec(Original)
- Maravilla (Poblacion)
- Maravilla-Arellano Ext. (Pob)
- Muelang
- Naguilayan East
- Naguilayan West
- Nancasalan
- Cabison-Bulaney-Niog
- Olegario-Caoile (Poblacion)
- Olo Cacamposan
- Olo Cafabrosan
- Olo Cagarlitan
- Osmeña (Poblacion)
- Pacalat
- Pampano
- Parian
- Paul
- Pogon-Aniat (with Sitio Pinera)
- Pogon-Lomboy (Poblacion)
- Ponglo-Baleg
- Ponglo-Muelag
- Quetegan (Pogon-Baleg)
- Quezon (Poblacion)
- Salavante
- Sapang
- Sonson Ongkit
- Suaco
- Tagac
- Takipan
- Talogtog
- Tococ Barikir
- Torre 1st
- Torre 2nd
- Torres Bugallon (Poblacion)
- Umangan
- Zamora (Poblacion)

=== Climate ===
Climate data for Mangatarem, Pangasinan
| Month | Jan | Feb | Mar | Apr | May | Jun | Jul | Aug | Sep | Oct | Nov | Dec | Year |
|---|---|---|---|---|---|---|---|---|---|---|---|---|---|
| Mean daily maximum °C (°F) | 31 (88) | 32 (90) | 33 (91) | 34 (93) | 33 (91) | 33 (91) | 31 (88) | 30 (86) | 31 (88) | 32 (90) | 32 (90) | 31 (88) | 32 (90) |
| Mean daily minimum °C (°F) | 22 (72) | 23 (73) | 24 (75) | 25 (77) | 25 (77) | 25 (77) | 25 (77) | 25 (77) | 24 (75) | 24 (75) | 24 (75) | 23 (73) | 24 (75) |
| Average precipitation mm (inches) | 9 (0.4) | 11.4 (0.45) | 11.1 (0.44) | 5.4 (0.21) | 258 (10.2) | 315.6 (12.43) | 463.1 (18.23) | 663.2 (26.11) | 479.7 (18.89) | 121.9 (4.80) | 75.8 (2.98) | 16.8 (0.66) | 2,431 (95.8) |
| Average rainy days | 4 | 3 | 2 | 2 | 12 | 15 | 19 | 21 | 18 | 12 | 9 | 5 | 122 |
Source: World Weather Online

== Demographics ==
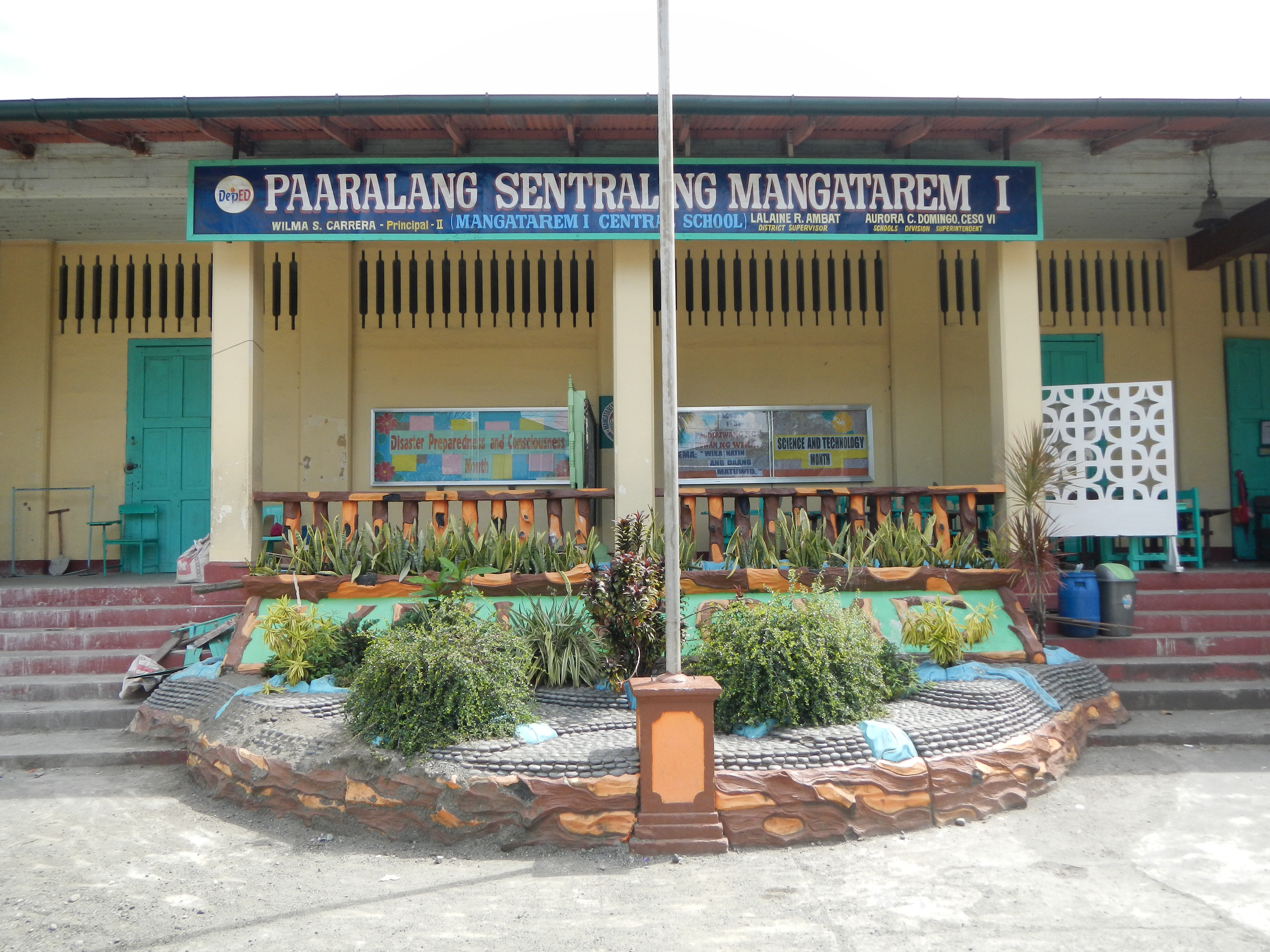
Mangatarem 1 Central School

Population census of Mangatarem
| Year | Pop. | ±% p.a. |
|---|---|---|
| 1903 | 12,895 | — |
| 1918 | 15,971 | +1.44% |
| 1939 | 18,658 | +0.74% |
| 1948 | 20,425 | +1.01% |
| 1960 | 28,931 | +2.94% |
| 1970 | 35,080 | +1.94% |
| 1975 | 37,604 | +1.40% |
| 1980 | 40,582 | +1.54% |
| 1990 | 47,714 | +1.63% |
| 1995 | 53,603 | +2.20% |
| 2000 | 60,943 | +2.79% |
| 2007 | 65,366 | +0.97% |
| 2010 | 69,969 | +2.51% |
| 2015 | 73,241 | +0.87% |
| 2020 | 79,323 | +1.69% |
| 2024 | 79,648 | +0.10% |
Source: Philippine Statistics Authority

== Economy ==
Poverty incidence of Mangatarem (%)

Source: Philippine Statistics Authority

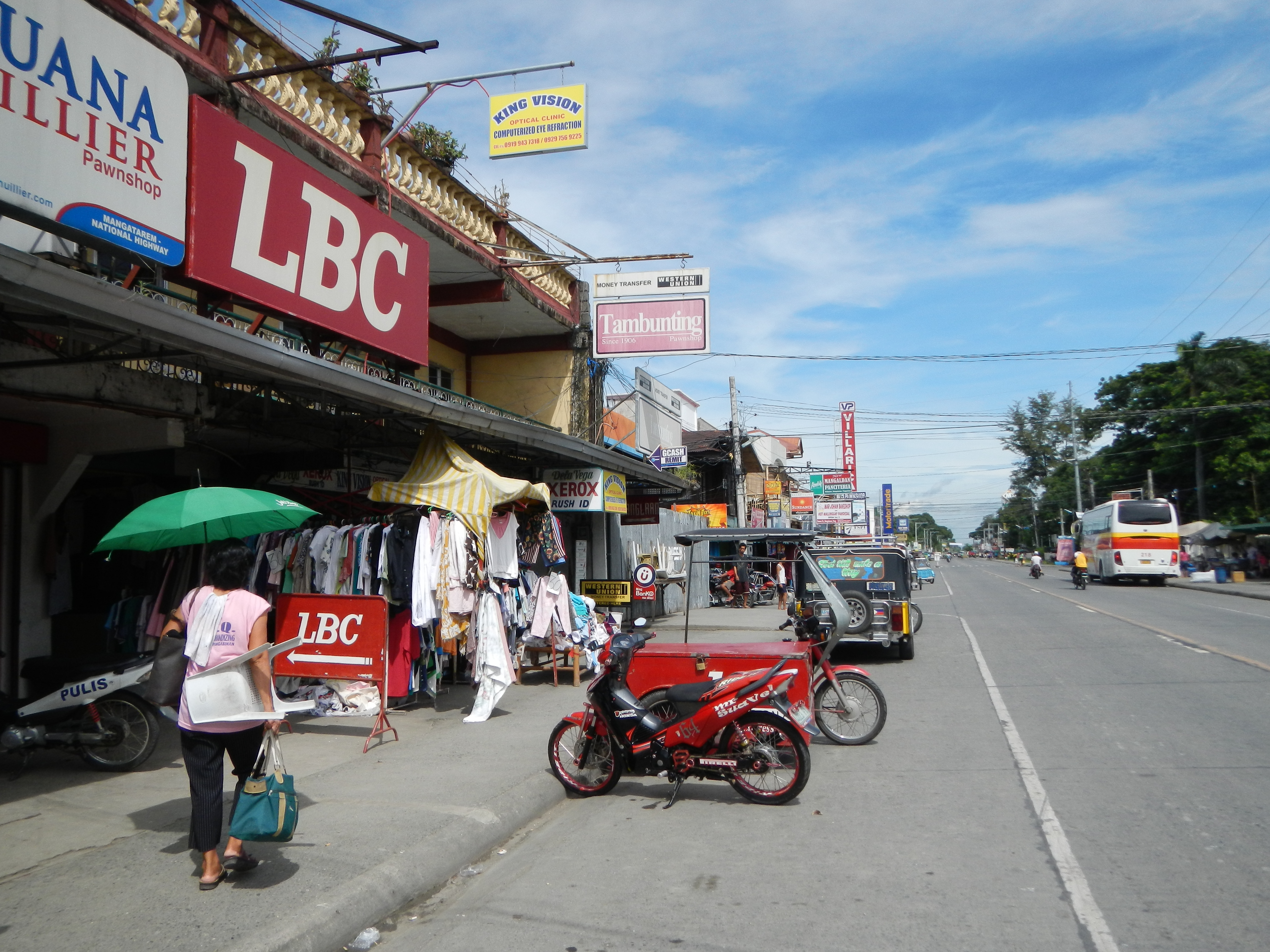
Mangatarem poblacion

In terms of economic activities, Mangatarem is primarily driven by agriculture. The municipality has the biggest land area in the entire Pangasinan province. A big percentage of its households also have family members who are working or have migrated abroad.

The town's poblacion area continues to attract major food, retail, and service establishments from Metro Manila and nearby cities within the province of Pangasinan. Service establishments include banks, courier, pawnshops, auto/motorcycle service shops.

The town's public market serves not only the local residents but also the residents and farmers or entrepreneurs from the adjoining towns of Urbiztondo, Aguilar, and San Clemente, Tarlac, especially on weekends. This is one of the reasons that major commercial establishments started to take notice of the municipality and decided to set up their branches here.

== Government ==
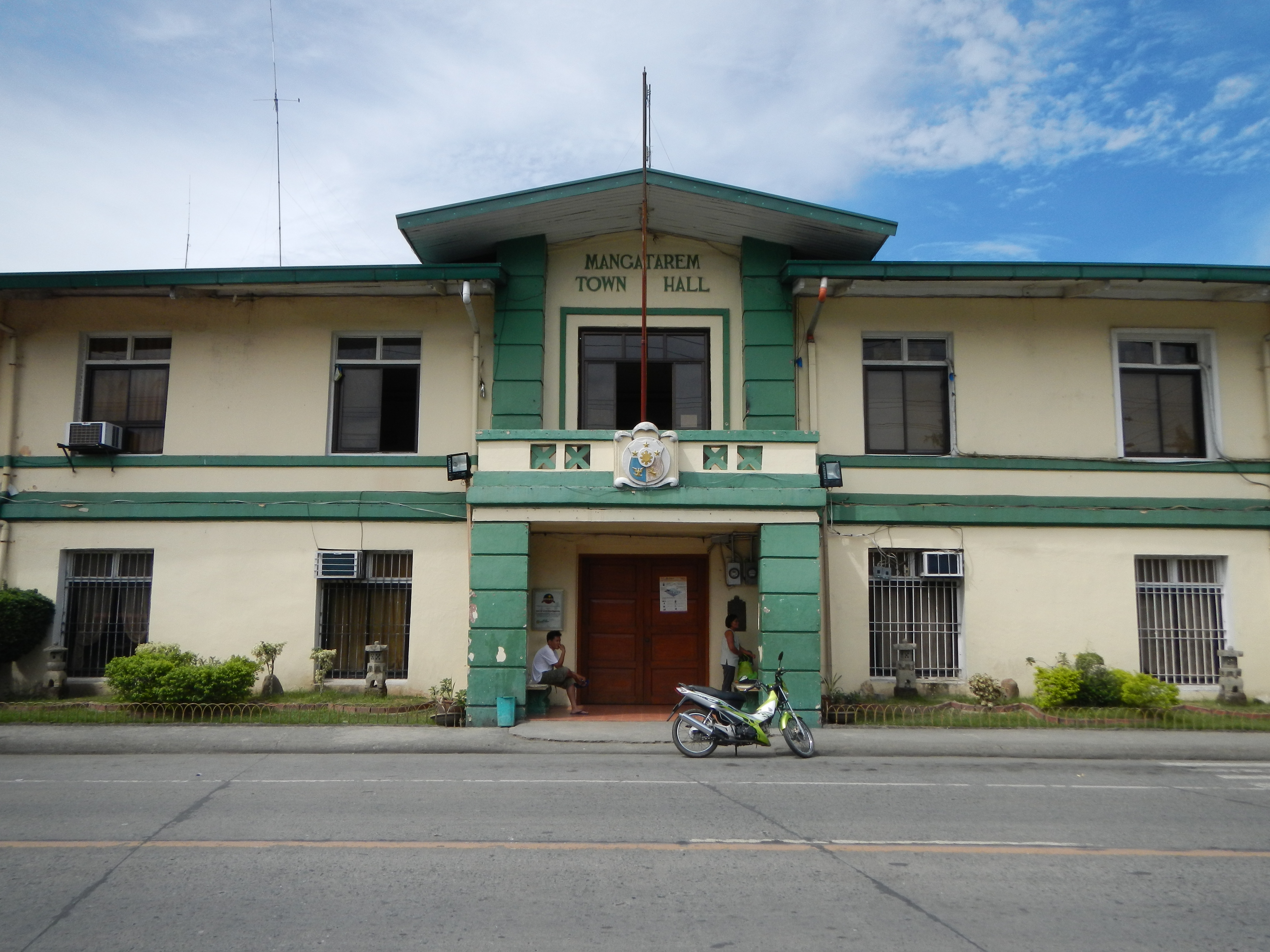
Mangatarem Town Hall

=== Local government ===
Mangatarem is part of the second congressional district of the province of Pangasinan. It is governed by a mayor, designated as its local chief executive, and by a municipal council as its legislative body in accordance with the Local Government Code. The mayor, vice mayor, and the councilors are elected directly by the people through an election which is being held every three years.

== Tourism ==
- St. Raymond of Peñafort Parish Church (Mangatarem)
- Manleluag Hot Spring Resort & Protected Landscape
- Immaltar Hot Spring
- Kanding Waterfalls (Canding Falls)
- Tangguyob Waterfalls (Timangguyob Falls)
- Pacalat Impounding Dam
- Daang Kalikasan

Mangatarem's tourist attractions are mostly natural (hot springs, waterfalls). These are frequented by local tourists during weekends and especially during summer. A number of local property owners have also developed their own pocket resorts outside of the poblacion area and opened these to the general public.

== Education ==
There are two schools district offices which govern all educational institutions within the municipality. They oversee the management and operations of all private and public elementary and high schools. Theser are the Mangatarem I Schools District Office, and Mangatarem II Schools District Office.

=== Primary and elementary schools ===
- Andangin-Baracbac Elementary School
- Bantay Elementary School
- Bantocaling Elementary School
- Bedania Elementary School
- Bogtong Elementary School
- Buenlag Elementary School
- Bueno Elementary School
- Bunlalacao Elementary School
- Cabaluyan 1st Elementary School
- Cabaluyan Elementary School
- Cabarabuan Elementary School
- Cabaruan Elementary School
- Cabayaoasan Elementary School
- Cabayugan Primary School
- Cacaoiten Elementary School
- Calomboyan Sur Elementary School
- Casilagan Elementary School
- Caturay Elementary School
- Caviernesan Elementary School
- Dorongan Elementary School
- Dorongan Silag Elementary School
- Ladder of Success Montessori School
- Lawak-Langka Elementary School
- Linmansangan Elementary School
- Macarang Elementary School
- Malabobo Elementary School
- Mangatarem I Central School
- Mangatarem II Central School
- Muelang Elementary School
- Naguilayan Elementary School
- Nancasalan Elementary School
- Olo Elementary School
- Pacalat Elementary School
- Pampano Elementary School
- Parian Elementary School
- Ponglo Elementary School
- Quetegan Elementary School
- Remlife Dream School
- Sapang Elementary School
- Sawat Elementary School
- Silag Elementary School
- Suaco Elementary School
- Tagac Elementary School
- Takipan Elementary School
- Talogtog Elementary School
- Tococ-Bariker Elementary School
- Torre Elementary School
- Umangan Elementary School
- Valerio Elementary School
- World Light Giver Academy

=== Secondary schools ===
- Bogtong National High School
- Cabayaoasan National High School
- Macarang National High School
- Mangatarem National High School
- Naguilayan National High School
- Olo National High School
- Quetegan National High School

=== Higher educational institution ===
- Mystical Rose College of Science and Technology
