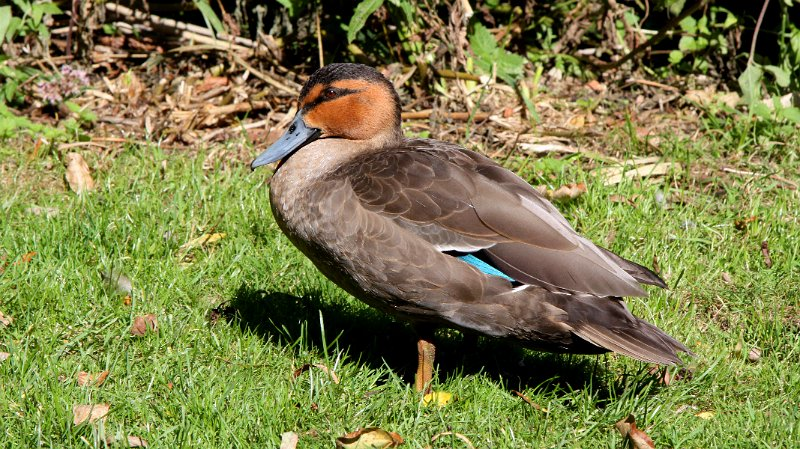

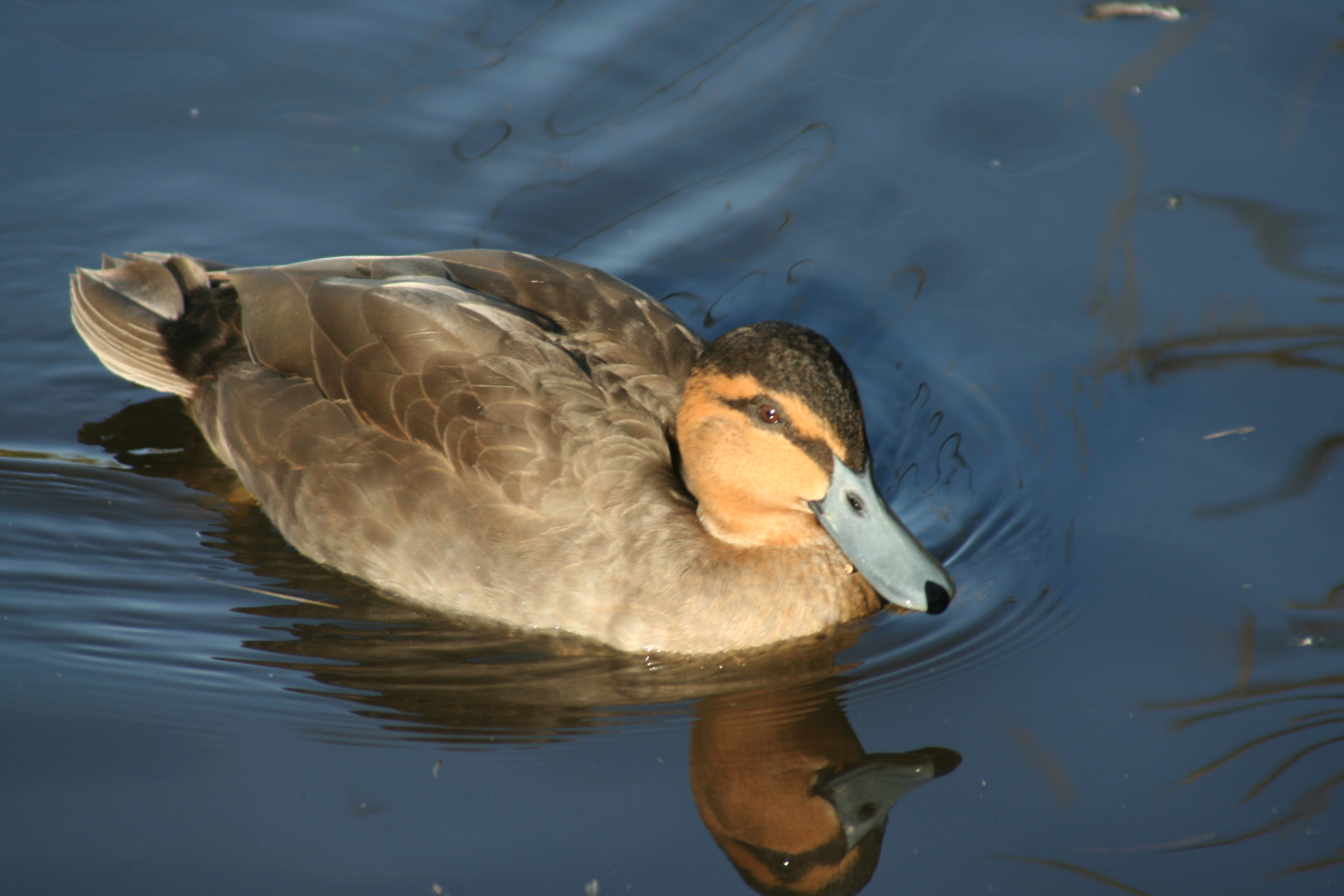

Conservation status
- Least Concern (IUCN 3.1)

Scientific classification
- Kingdom: Animalia
- Phylum: Chordata
- Class: Aves
- Order: Anseriformes
- Family: Anatidae
- Genus: Anas
- Species: A. luzonica

Binomial name
- Anas luzonica Fraser, 1839

= Philippine duck =

Species of bird

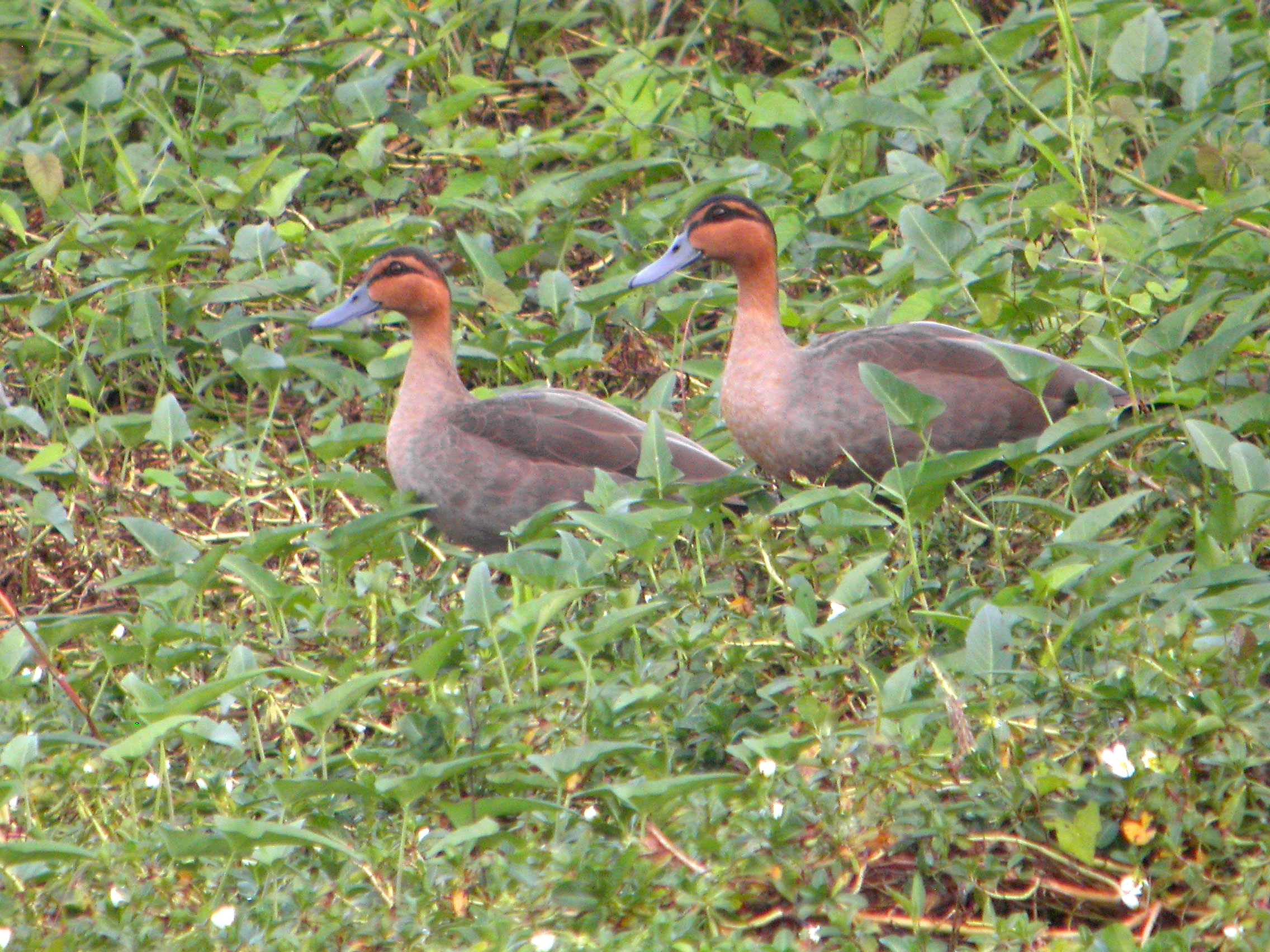
Philippine ducks in the Candaba Swamp

The Philippine duck (Anas luzonica) is a large dabbling duck of the genus Anas. Its native name is papan or patong gubat which translates to "forest duck" in Tagalog. It is the only endemic duck in the Philippines but has been recorded as a vagrant in Taiwan and Japan. Its habitat in a wide variety of wetlands from mountain lakes, marshes, small pools, streams, rivers, salt pans and even coastal waters where it feeds on shrimp, fish, insects and plant matter. This species has declined considerably since the 1960s because of hunting and habitat loss, but has regained population size and is listed as Least Concern.

== Description ==
The Philippine duck is a large conspicuous duck. It has a black crown, nape and eye stripe, with a cinnamon head and neck. The rest of its body is greyish brown with a bright green speculum. Its legs are greyish brown, and its bill is bluish-grey. Male body mass averages 891 grams (1.964 lb), and the slightly smaller female averages 777 grams (1.713 lb).

== Taxonomy ==
The Philippine duck is a dabbling duck and a member of the genus Anas. It has no subspecies and so it is monotypic. It belongs to the Pacific clade of Anas along with the koloa, the Laysan duck, the Pacific black duck, and the extinct Mariana mallard.

The scientific name comes from the Latin Anas, 'duck' and the Philippine island Luzon.

It is known in the Philippines as papan or patong gubat.

== Distribution and habitat ==
The Philippine duck is known to inhabit all of the major Philippine islands and 8 minor islands, but since the 1980s most sightings have been on Luzon and Mindanao. Long-distance vagrants have been sighted in Okinawa and Taiwan.

It is found in all types of wetlands within its range, but its preferred habitat is shallow freshwater marshland.

== Ecology and behavior ==
The diet of the Philippine duck includes plants, rice, molluscs and crustaceans. It is also reported to also feed on fish, frogs and insects. It is reported to be a pest in farms as they supposedly damage newly sown fields and germinating seeds. This species is more active in the early morning, evening and bright moonlit nights. Typically seen in pairs or small groups but flocks of up to 2,000 have been seen, possibly even larger before this species was heavily hunted. It is seen associating with other ducks including Wandering whistling duck, Garganey, Northern shoveler, Eurasian wigeon and Tufted duck.

Not much is known about its breeding habits in the wild. Nests found were well concealed with 10 eggs. Breeding season is believed to be March to November with the peak in July to August. Incubation takes 25 to 27 days and only the female incubates. Fledging occurs at around 8 weeks.

== Conservation status ==
The Philippine duck is listed as Least Concern on the IUCN Red List with the population estimated to be 15,000 - 30,000 mature individuals. The species experienced steep population decreases starting in the 1970s, mainly due to hunting and habitat loss. However, as of 2025, the population appears to have stabilised.

Habitat loss is mainly due to wetland drainage, aquaculture, mangrove destruction and fishpond creation. Up to 10,000 birds were previously recorded in the Candaba Swamp but this area has since been mostly converted into farmland and is also heavily hunted.

The species occurs in multiple protected areas including Manleluag Spring Protected Landscape, Mounts Iglit-Baco National Park, Naujan Lake National Park, Bataan National Park, Northern Sierra Madre Natural Park, Las Piñas-Parañaque Wetland Park and Olango Island, a Ramsar wetland.
