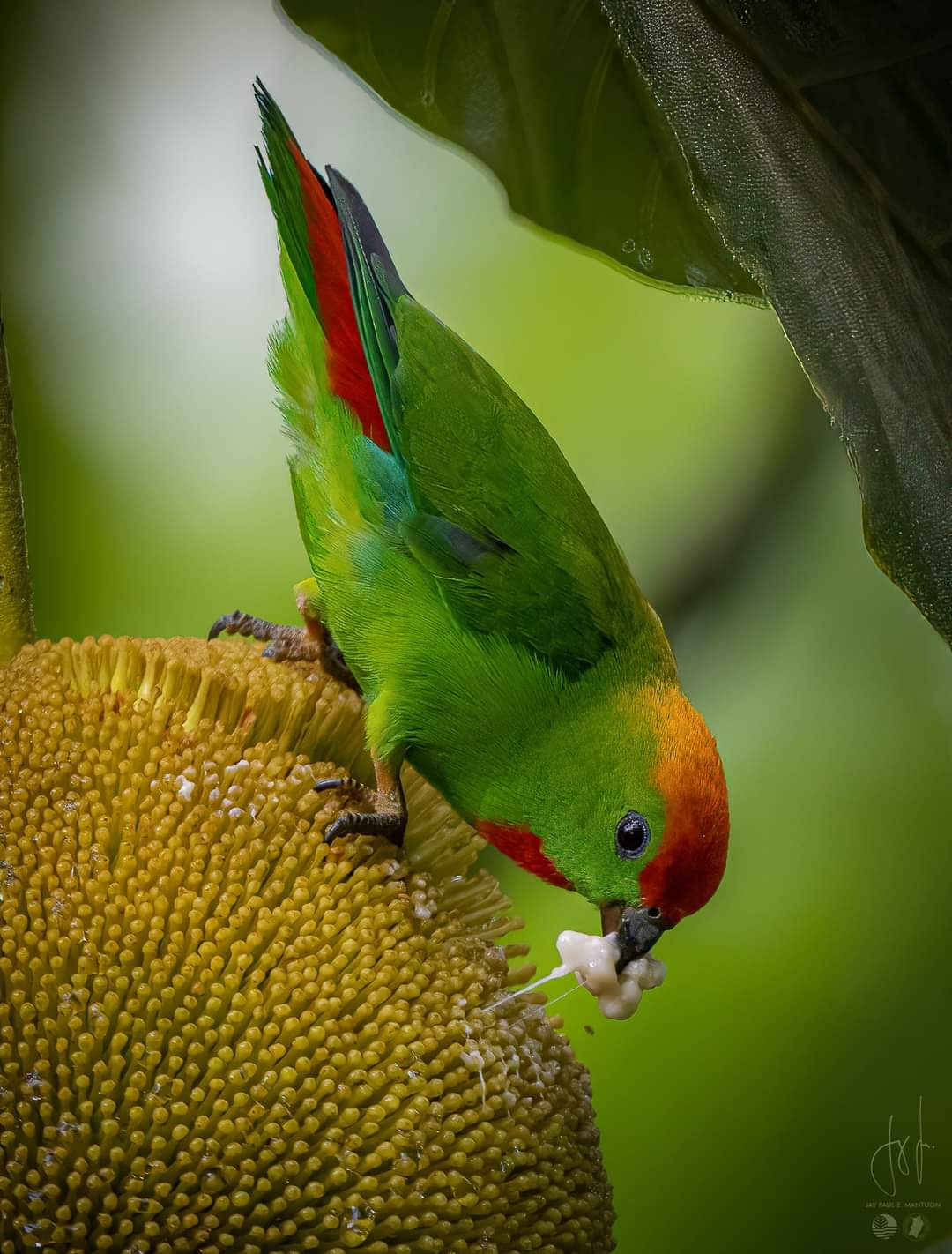
- An escapee from the illegal wildlife trade seen Zamboanga

Scientific classification
- Kingdom: Animalia
- Phylum: Chordata
- Class: Aves
- Order: Psittaciformes
- Family: Psittaculidae
- Genus: Loriculus
- Species: L. bonapartei

Binomial name
- Loriculus bonapartei Souancé, 1856

= Black-billed hanging parrot =

Parrot species from the Philippines

The black-billed hanging parrot (Loriculus bonapartei) is a hanging parrot native to the Sulu Archipelago of the Philippines. It was formerly conspecific with the Philippine hanging parrot.

== Description and taxonomy ==
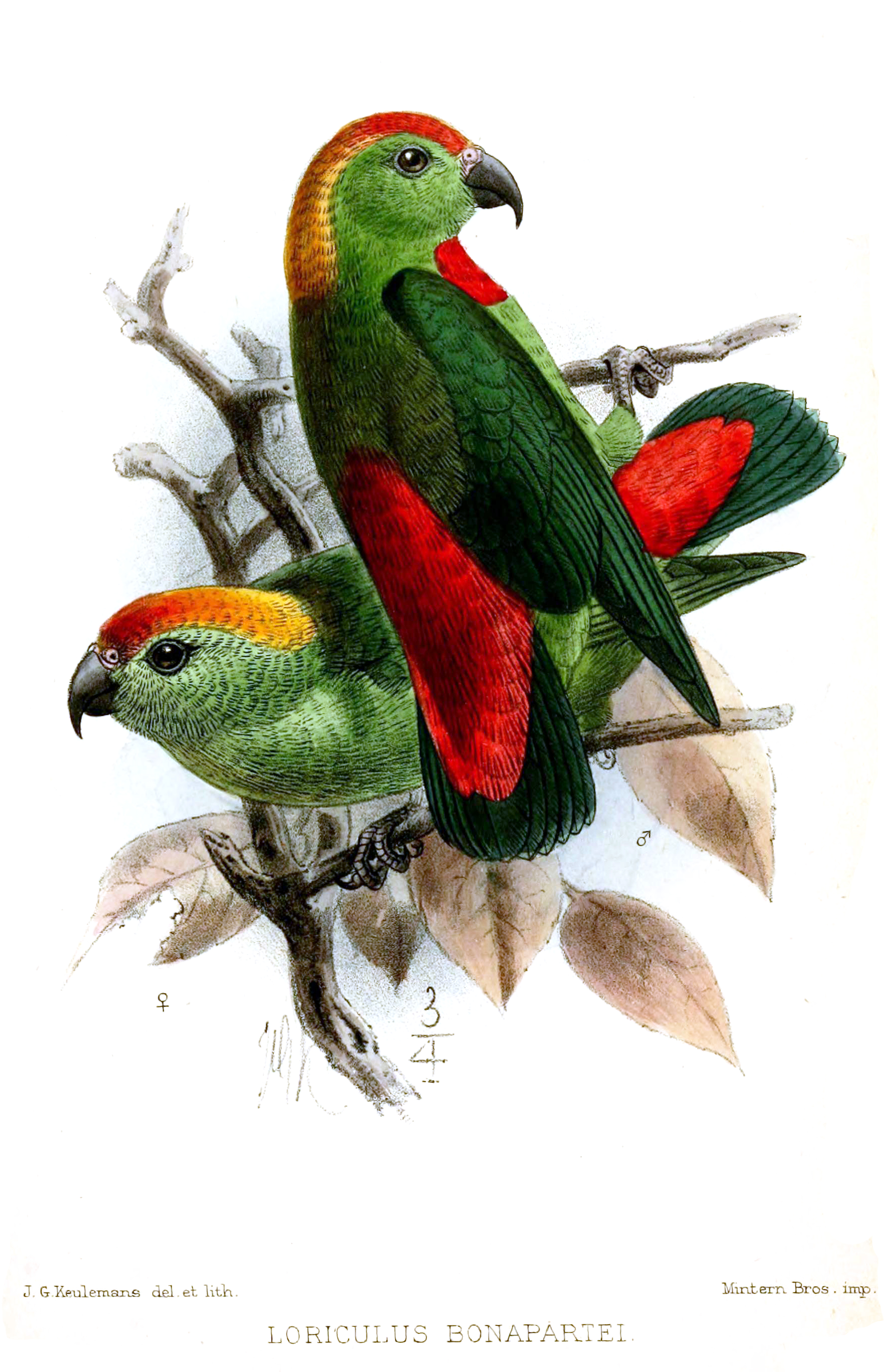
An illustration by John Gerrard Keulemans

It is 14 cm long. The front of the crown of the black-billed hanging parrot is red, turning to orange and yellow on the back of the crown. The tail is green above and blue below. Most of its feathers are bright green, its bill is black and its irises are brown.

It was previous conspecific with the Philippine hanging parrot but was split based on its morphological differences from its black or dark red bill and duller gray legs

This species is monotypic and has no subspecies.

Diet is not well known but presumed to be the same as Philippine hanging parrot which feeds on flowers, bananas and figs.

== Behaviour and ecology ==
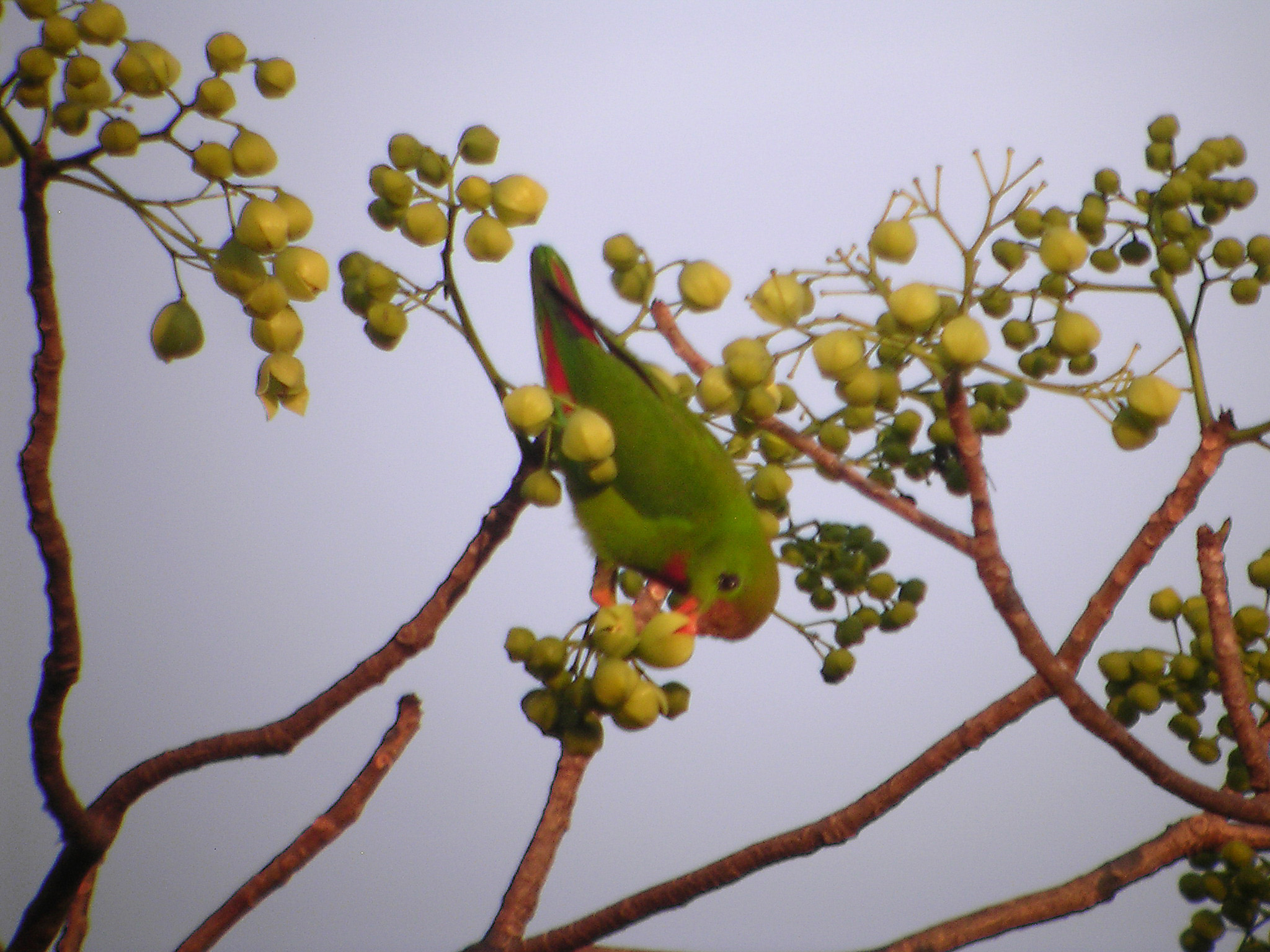
A male L. p. philippensis eating fruit at Subic Bay, Luzon, Philippines.

Its behaviour and ecology is presumed to be similar to Philippine hanging parrots. This species are usually encountered alone or in pairs, rarely in small groups. They mostly forage for food in the canopy or middle storeys of forests, and their diet is composed of nectar and flowers as well as soft fruits such as those from figs (Ficus).

The Philppine hanging-parrot is a seasonal breeder, with nesting occurring from March to May. Like most parrots it is a cavity nester; a nest found in the wild was in a cavity high up in a dead tree. However, it is one of the few species of parrots that uses nesting material in the nest, the female tucks nesting material between feathers in order to take it back to the nest. In captivity the clutch size was 3 eggs which are incubated for 20 days. The chicks take around 35 days to fledge after hatching. The rounded eggs measure about 18.7 x 16.4mm.

== Habitat and conservation status ==
It is found in tropical moist lowland forest, forest edge, bushy areas, coconut plantations and bamboo clusters.

IUCN has yet to assess this bird but .Jolo and Sanga-Sanga are almost completely deforested with the remaining forests in Tawi-Tawi being converted into palm oil and rubber plantations. Like the Philippine hanging parrot, it is often caught for the illegal wildlife trade, with escapees recorded outside of its range in Zamboanga City.
