= Saint Raymond of Peñafort Parish Church (Mangatarem) =

Roman Catholic church in Pangasinan, Philippines

Mangatarem Church
- Saint Raymond of Peñafort Parish Church
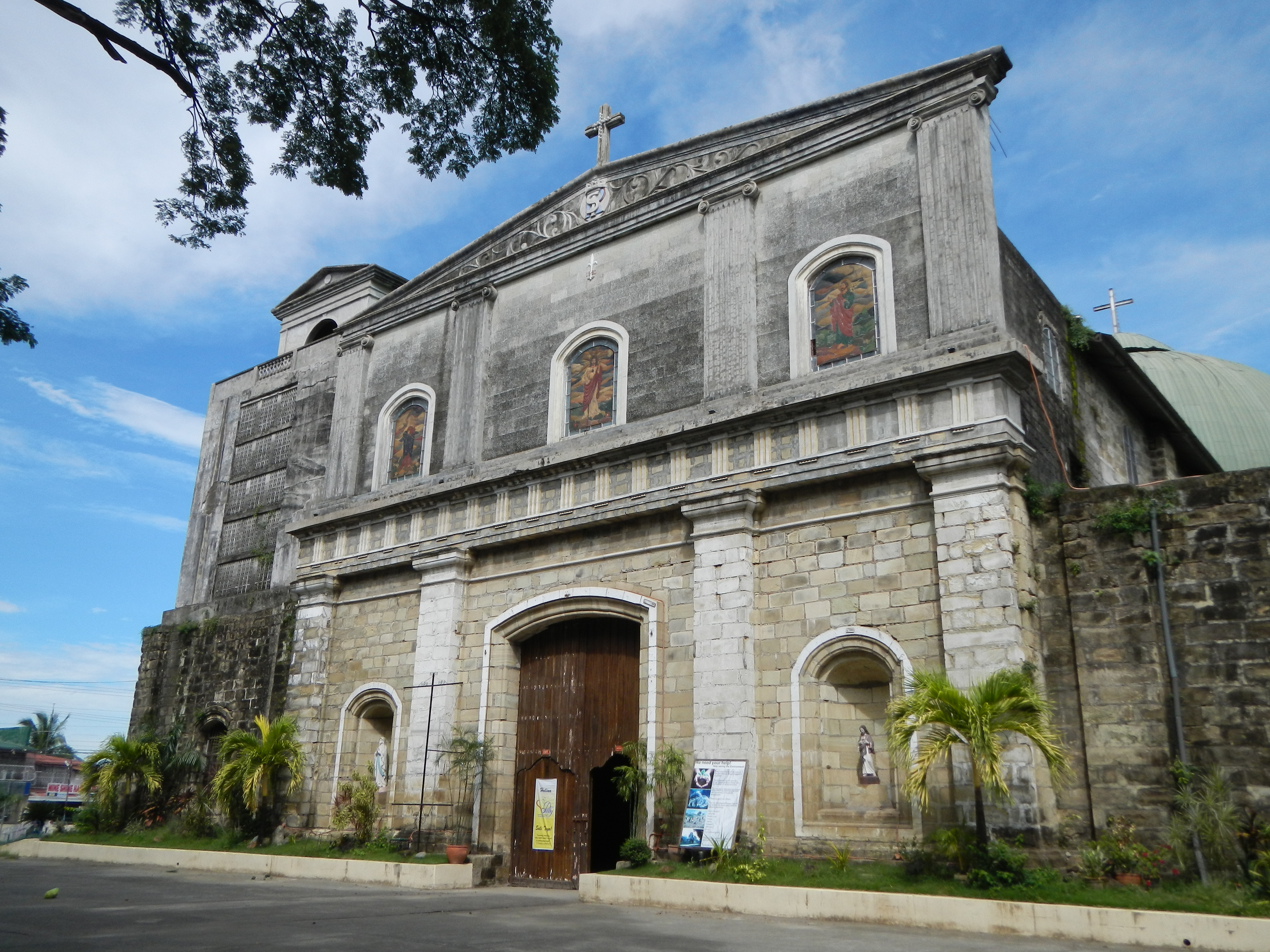
- Church façade in 2013

- Location in Luzon Location in the Philippines
- 15°47′19″N 120°17′41″E
- Location: Mangatarem, Pangasinan
- Country: Philippines
- Denomination: Roman Catholic

History
- Status: Parish church
- Dedication: Saint Raymond of Peñafort

Architecture
- Functional status: Active
- Architectural type: Church building
- Style: Early Renaissance

Administration
- Archdiocese: Lingayen-Dagupan
- Diocese: Alaminos

Clergy
- Archbishop: Most Rev. Socrates B. Villegas, DD
- Bishop(s): Most Rev. Napoleon B. Sipalay Jr., OP, DD]]

Saint Raymond of Peñafort Parish Church, commonly known as Mangatarem Church, is a Roman Catholic church located in the municipality of Mangatarem in Pangasinan, the Philippines. It is under the jurisdiction of the Diocese of Alaminos. It was first established as a visita of San Carlos and became an independent parish in 1835. The Dominicans accepted the administration of Mangatarem in 1837.

== History ==
Father Joaquin Perez built a wooden church and brick convent from 1835 to 1844 (182 years ago) but both were burned in 1862. The foundations of the present church was laid down by Father Manuel Alvarez del Manzano. It was continued by Father Suarez until 1875. Father Vicente Iztequi finished the church and constructed the present convent from 1875 to 1886 (140 years ago).

== Architectural features ==
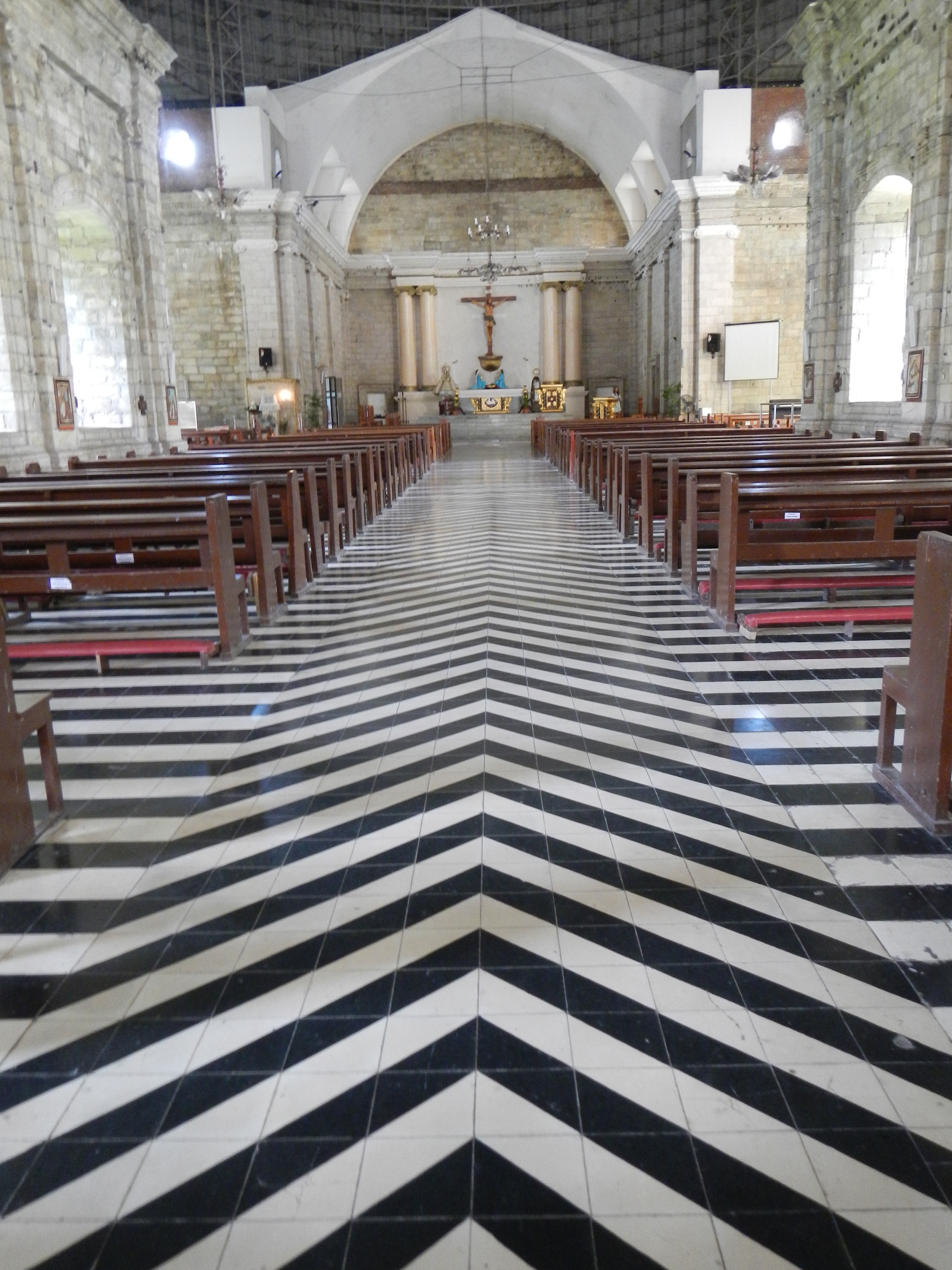
Church interior in 2013

The church reflects an Early Renaissance architectural style. It has a simple facade with low pediment. The upper and lower levels are separated by dentil-like elements. Niches, windows, and the doorway relieve the monotony of the simple facade.

== Gallery ==
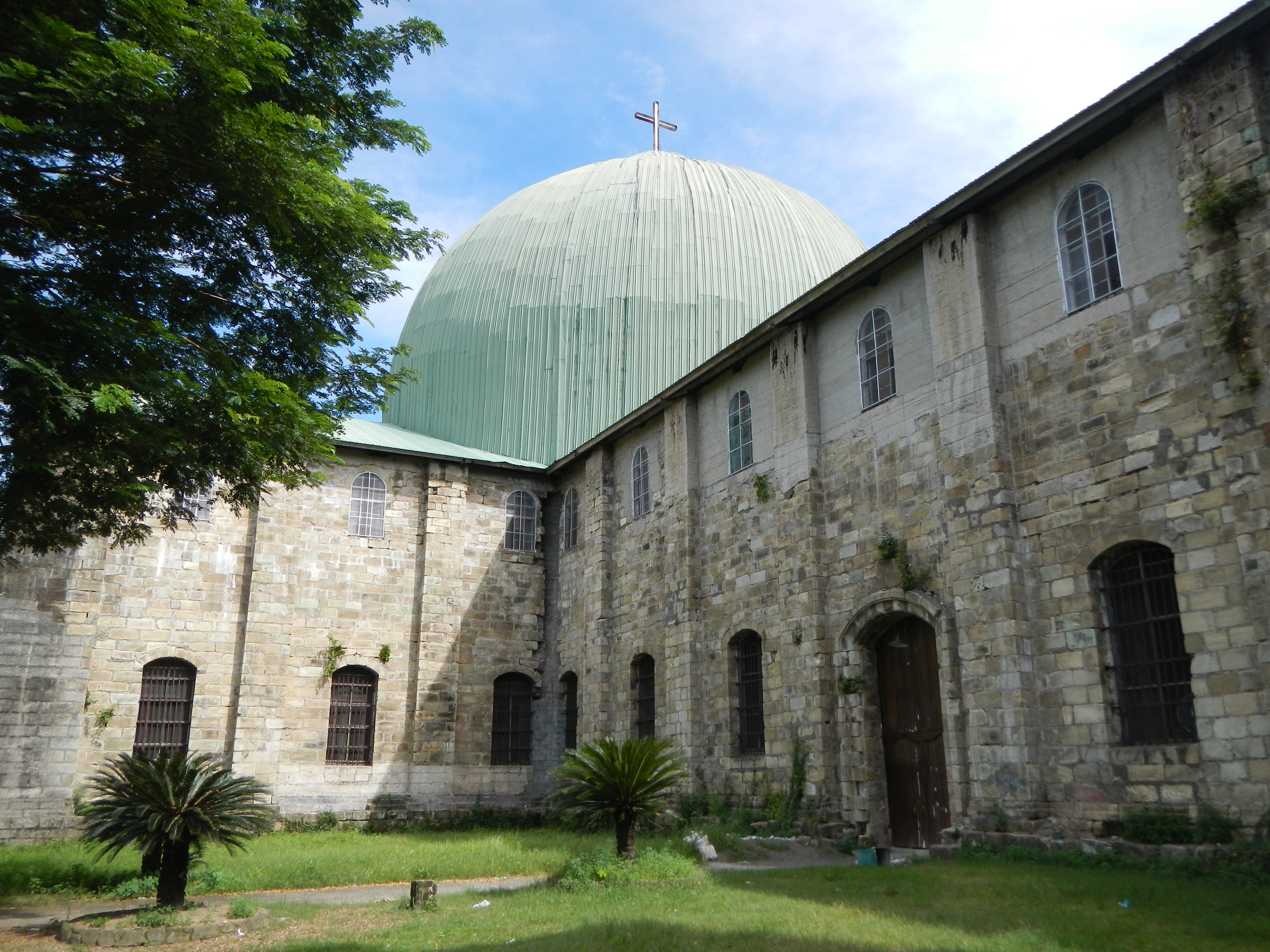
Church outer walls, dome, and clerestories

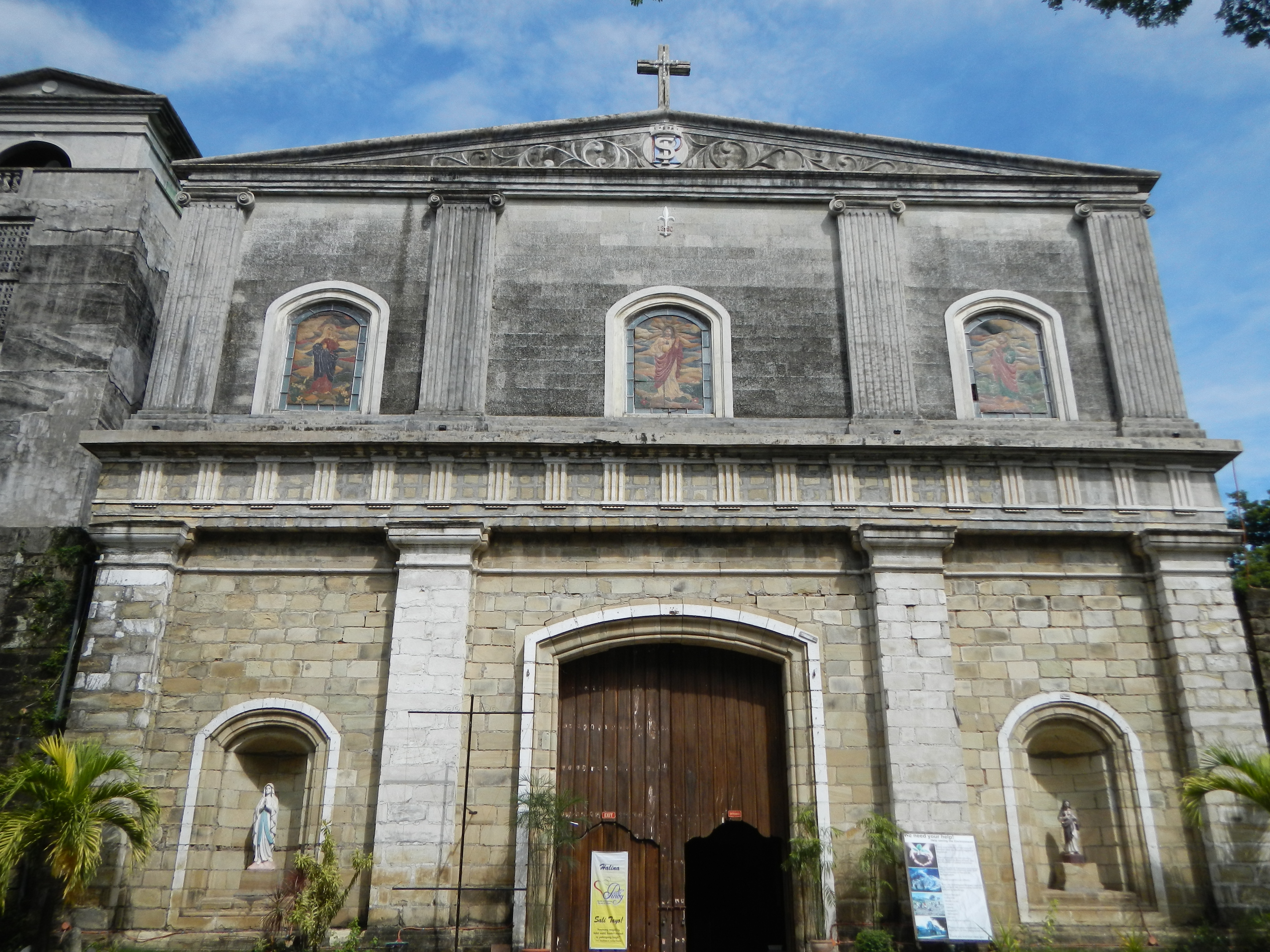
Facade detail

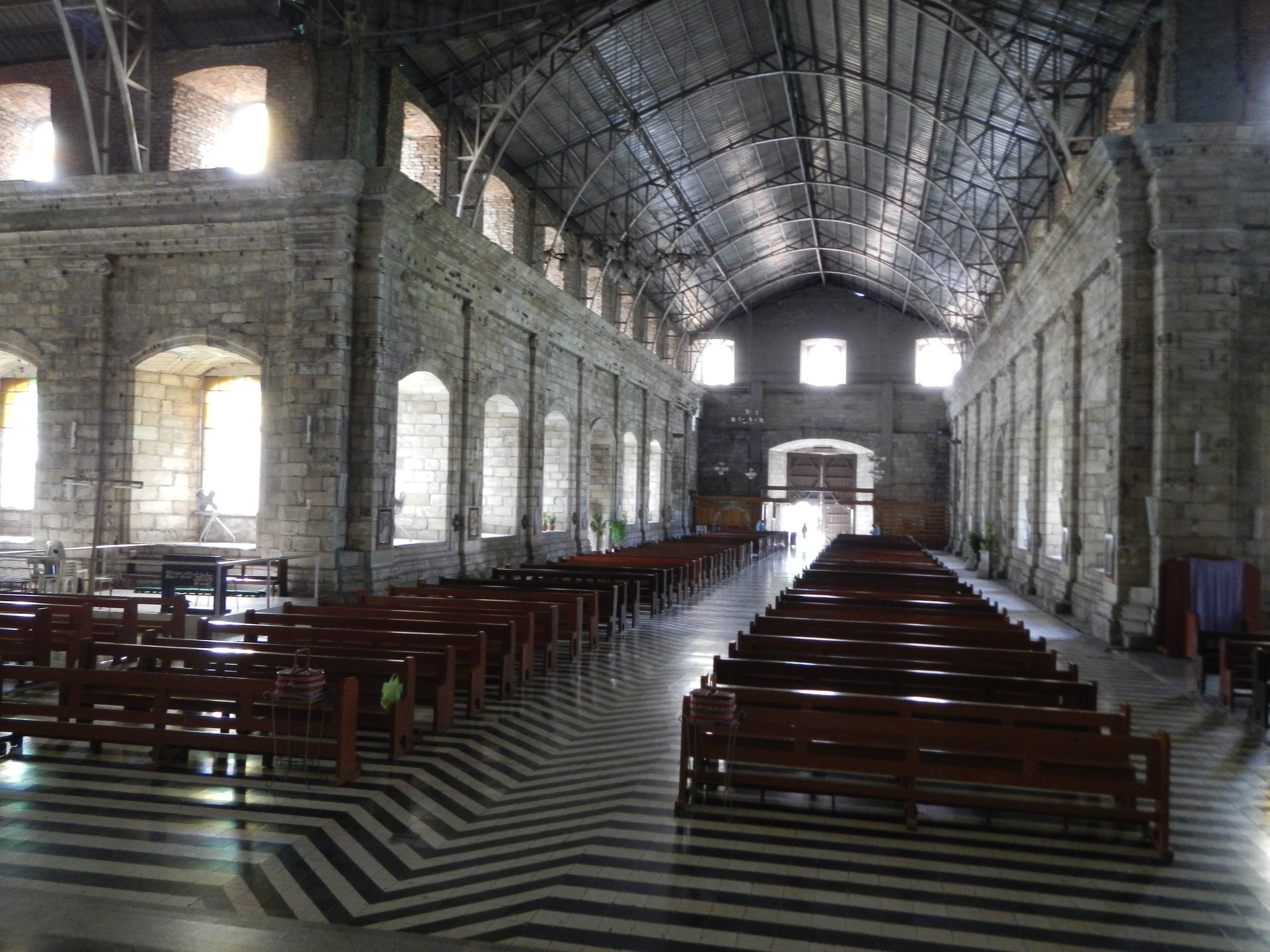
Church interior from the chancel

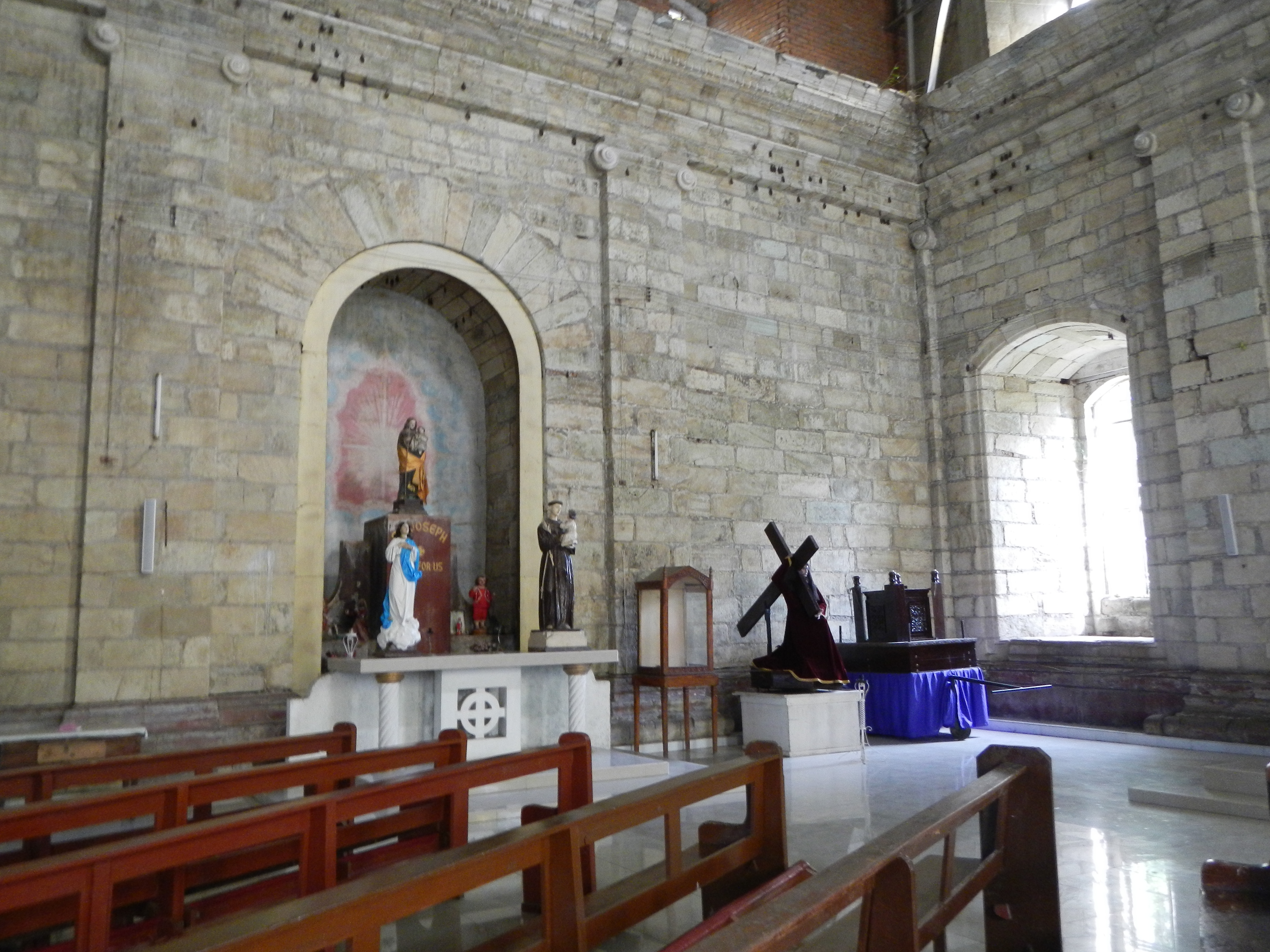
Niche in one of the transepts

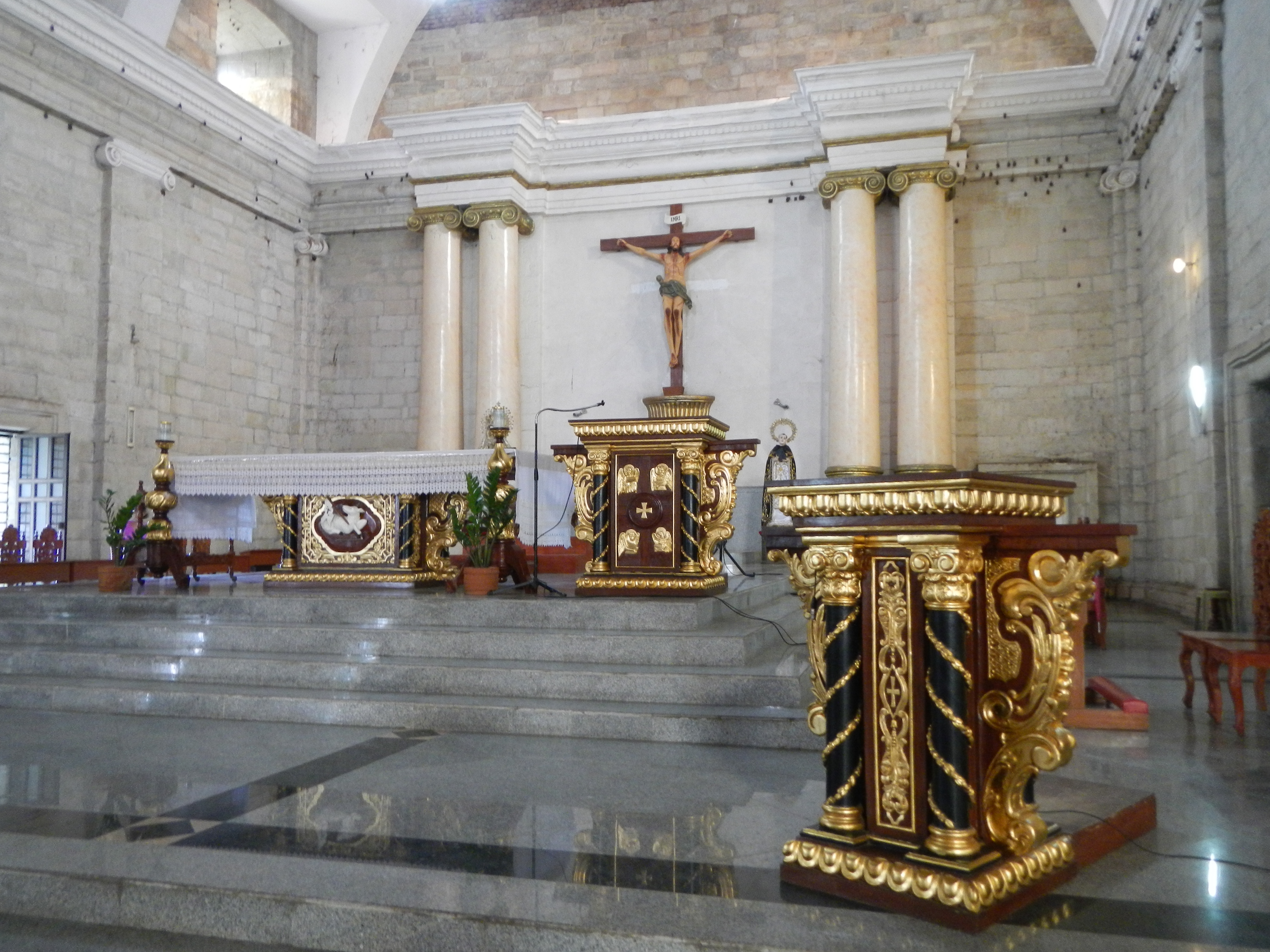
Church lectern and sanctuary
