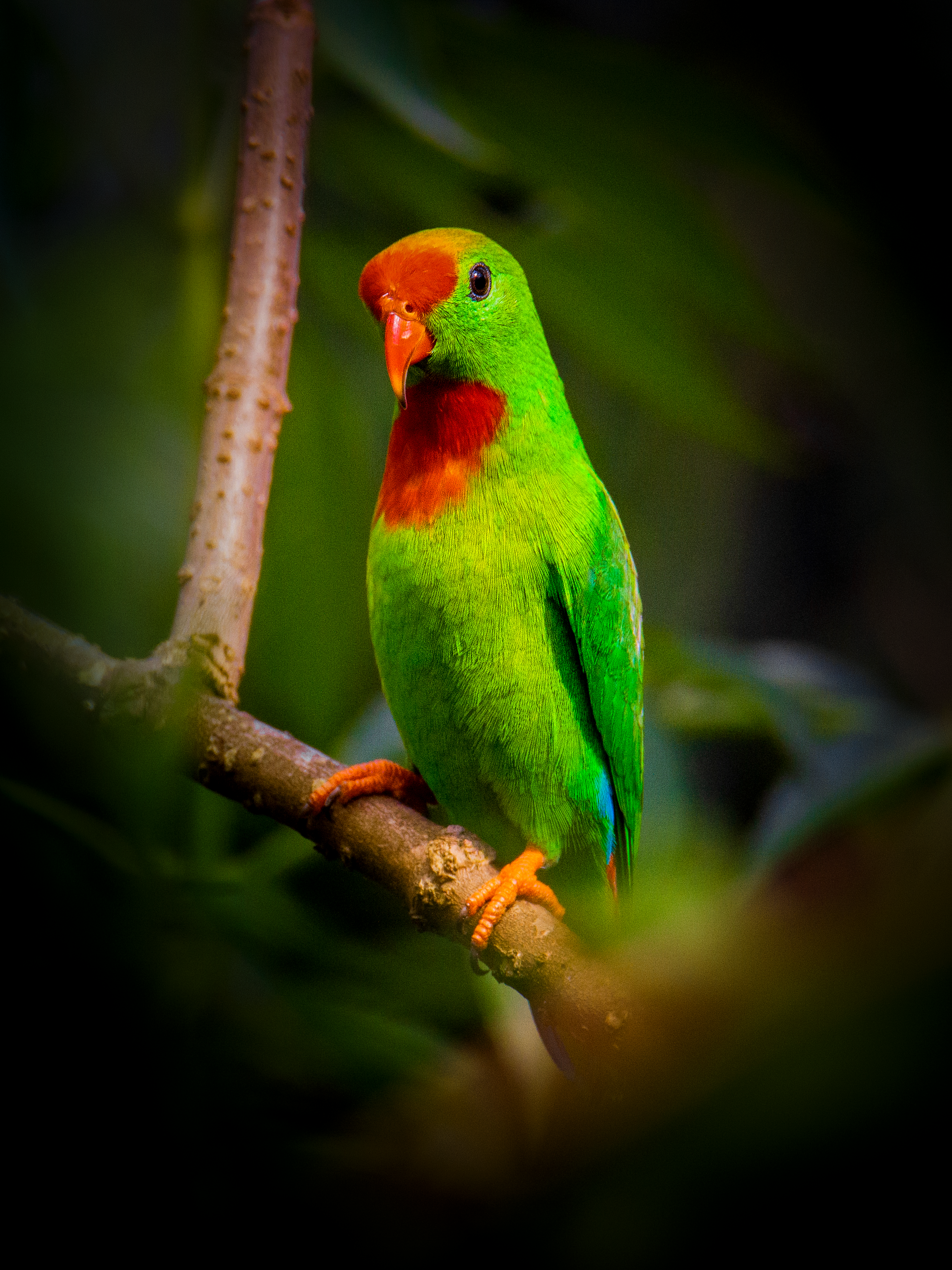
- Male ssp. philippensis
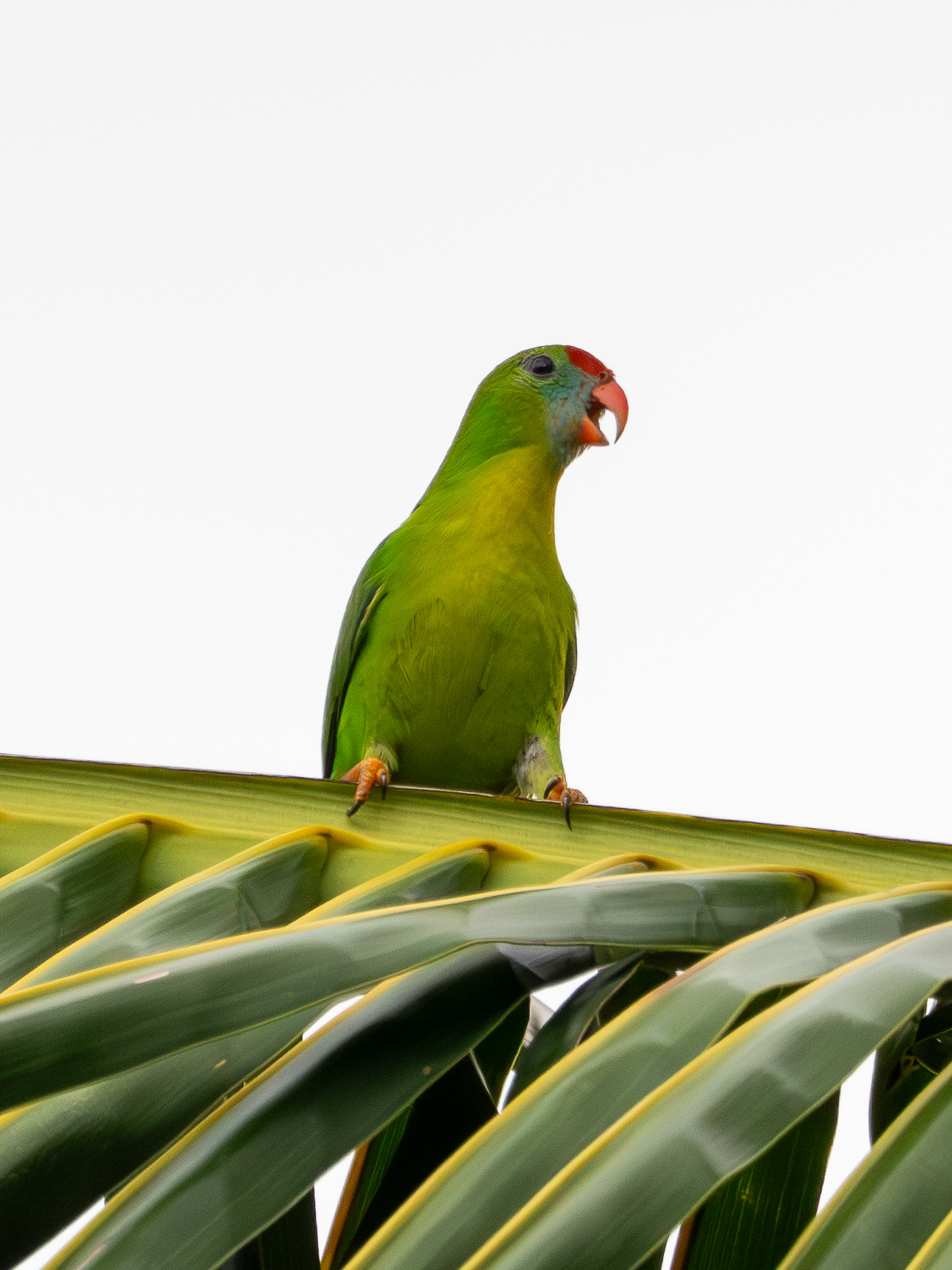
- Female ssp. philippinensis

Conservation status
- Least Concern (IUCN 3.1)

Scientific classification
- Kingdom: Animalia
- Phylum: Chordata
- Class: Aves
- Order: Psittaciformes
- Family: Psittaculidae
- Genus: Loriculus
- Species: L. philippensis

Binomial name
- Loriculus philippensis (P.L.S. Müller, 1776)

= Philippine hanging parrot =

Species of bird

The Philippine hanging parrot (Loriculus philippensis), also commonly known as the colasisi from its local Tagalog name "kulasisi", is a small psittaculid parrot species endemic to the Philippines. It includes about 9 subspecies but formerly included the Camiguin hanging parrot and the Black-billed hanging parrot which have seen been recognized as distinct species. While it is listed as Least Concern in IUCN, some subspecies, such as L. p. chyrsonotus of Cebu and L. p. siquijorensis of Siquijor, may already be extinct. The species is threatened by habitat loss, but a bigger threat is trapping for the illegal wildlife trade; wild-caught birds are often sold as pets in streets and online selling groups.

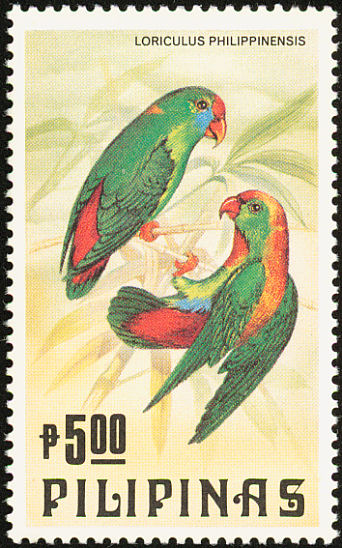
A Philippine postal stamp depicting a female (left) and male (right. While not specified, this depiction is likely of the apicalis subspecies.

== Description ==
Philippine hanging parrots are about 14 cm (5.5 in) long, weigh 32–40 grams, and have a short rounded tail. They are mainly green with areas of red, orange, yellow, and blue varying between subspecies. The forehead is red and the irises are dark brown. Adults have red beaks and orange legs. They are sexually dimorphic with only the males having red on their chin or upper chest, except for the Loriculus (philippensis) camiguinensis in which neither the male or female has a red bib or chest. Juveniles have less red on their heads and paler beaks, but otherwise resemble the female.

== Taxonomy ==
The species or species complex was initially described by Statius Müller in 1776. The exact taxonomy listing is unclear.

=== Subspecies ===
As of 2025, 9 subspecies are recognized:

- L. p. philippensis (Statius Muller) 1776 — Found on Luzon, Marinduque, Polilio Islands
- L. p. apicalis Souance 1856 — Found on Mindanao; mantle washed golden yellow
- L. p. chrysonotus Sclater, PL 1872 (Cebu hanging parrot) † — Found on Cebu; golden hindcrown with orange collar - Likely extinct. Philippine-hanging parrots are still recorded on the island however many of these birds display features different from the subspecies, it is likely that these birds are escapees or have hybridized with the native population.
- L. p. bournsi McGregor 1905 — Found on Sibuyan; reduced red on the crown and has a smaller yellow patch
- L. p. dohertyi Hartert 1906 — Found on Basilan; similar to apicalis but mantle more orange and larger red spot on breast on males
- L. p. mindorensis Steere 1890 — Found on Mindoro; lacks yellowish tones on crown with a reduced or absent nape markings
- L. p. regulus Souance 1856 — Found on West and Central Visayas (except Siquijor); entire hindcrown yellow
- L. p. siquijorensis Steere 1890 †; — Found on Siquijor; hindcrown and nape green with a smaller throat patch; likely extinct.
- L. p. worcesteri Steere 1890; — Found Eastern Visayas; entire crown red with faint orange yellow on nape and mantle

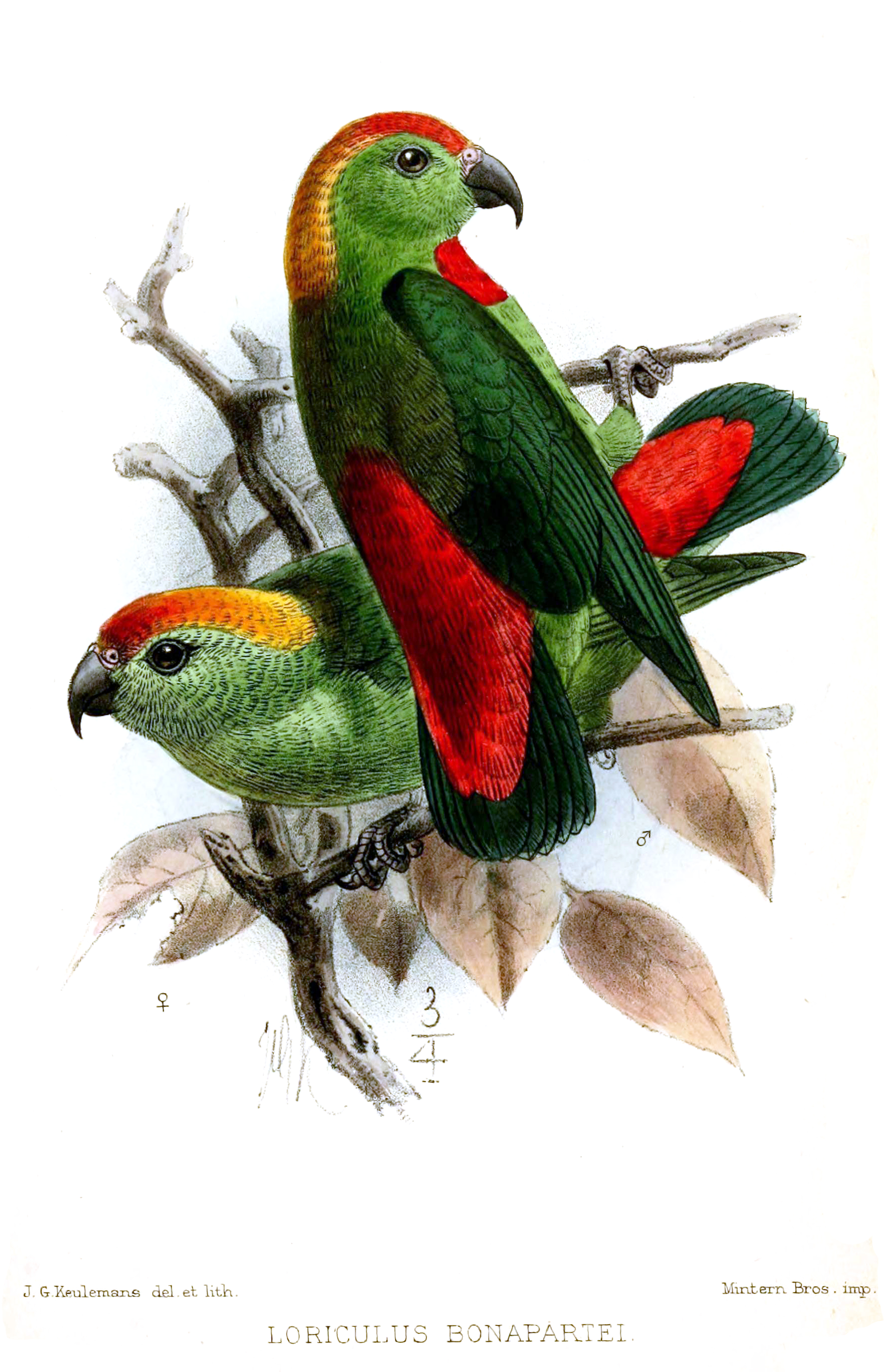
L. p. bonapartei which has now been split into the Black-billed hanging parrot

In 2006, hanging parrots living on the island of Camiguin, off the northern coast of Mindanao, were described and thought to have a separate identity and is now known as the Camiguin hanging parrot which is distinct as it exhibits no sexual dimorphism. However, this species has not yet been studied through molecular-genetic analysis and its status as a species is not universally accepted. The Black-billed hanging parrot endemic to the Sulu Archipelago was also once a subspecies but differs greatly with its black bill and dull gray legs.

== Distribution and habitat ==
The Philippine hanging parrot is native to the Philippines except the Sulu Archipelago and it is not widespread on Palawan. The different subspecies are native to different islands, and some subspecies are rare or almost extinct. Trading of birds between the islands for pets has resulted in escaped pets living on different islands to where they originated.

Its natural habitats are tropical moist lowland forests, bamboo forest and tropical moist montane forest. It also occupies human-modified habitats including coconut groves and secondary forest. It is most common in lowland areas, being rare above 1250 m.

== Behaviour and ecology ==
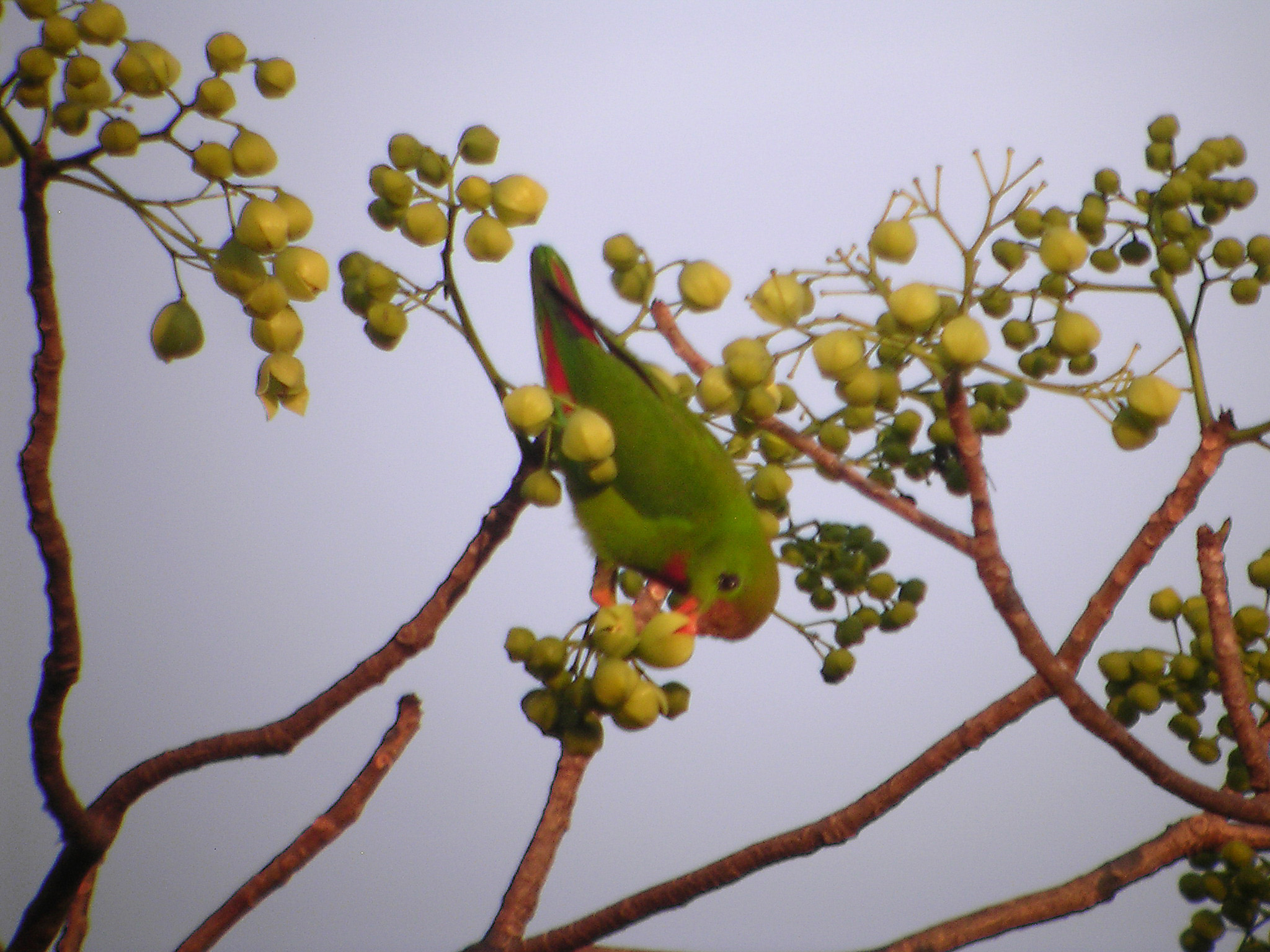
A male L. p. philippensis eating fruit at Subic Bay, Luzon, Philippines.

Philippine hanging parrots are usually encountered alone or in pairs, rarely in small groups. They mostly forage for food in the canopy or middle storeys of forests, and their diet is composed of nectar and flowers as well as soft fruits such as those from figs (Ficus).

The species is a seasonal breeder, with nesting occurring from March to May. Like most parrots it is a cavity nester; a nest found in the wild was in a cavity high up in a dead tree. However, it is one of the few species of parrots that uses nesting material in the nest, the female tucks nesting material between feathers in order to take it back to the nest. In captivity the clutch size was 3 eggs which are incubated for 20 days. The chicks take around 35 days to fledge after hatching. The rounded eggs measure about 18.7 x 16.4mm.

== Conservation status ==
The IUCN has classified the species as least concern as it has a large range and in reasonably common in some parts of its range. This species is actually very adaptable to habitat loss and can surve in suburban habitats. However, this species' population is on the decline as it is heavily traded for the pet trade. The Cebu and Siquijor subspecies are both already feared extinct while the West Visayan, Mindoro and an undescribed population in Bohol seem to be threatened. Another threat is hybridization of subspecies, Colasisi's are now regularly seen in Cebu however it is believed that these are escapees from the pet trade and if the endemic subspecies still exists it has hybridized with escapees.
