= Lepanto-Bontoc =

Former province of the Philippines

- Province of the Philippines
- 1902–1908
- Location of the historical province of Lepanto-Bontoc.
- Capital: Cervantes
- Historical era: Colonial Period
  - Established: 28 May 1902
  - Disestablished: 18 August 1908
Preceded by
Amburayan
Bontoc
Cagayan
Isabela
Lepanto
Succeeded by
Mountain Province
- Today part of: · Benguet · Ilocos Sur · Kalinga · La Union · Mountain Province

Lepanto-Bontoc was a province of the Philippines, existing from 1902 to 1908. The province encompassed much of the central section of the Cordillera mountains in Luzon. Its capital was Cervantes, in the sub-province of Lepanto.

== Administrative Division ==
Sub-provinces of Lepanto-Bontoc in colours.

Prior to its incorporation into the Mountain Province in 1908, its territory consisted of:

- the sub-province of Amburayan (capital: Alilem, 1902–1907; Tagudin, 1907–1920), encompassing most of the Amburayan River basin
- the sub-province of Bontoc (capital: Bontoc), encompassing the upper portions of the Chico and Siffu river basins
- the sub-province of Kalinga (capital: Tabuc), encompassing the lower portions of the Chico River basin south of Tuao in Cagayan, and
- the sub-province of Lepanto (capital: Cervantes), encompassing most of the upper Tineg (Abra) River basin.

The territory of Lepanto-Bontoc is now divided between the present-day provinces of:

- Benguet (municipalities of Bakun and Mankayan)
- Ilocos Sur (municipalities of Alilem, Cervantes, Gregorio del Pilar, Quirino, San Emilio, Sigay, Sugpon, Suyo and Tagudin)
- Kalinga
- La Union (municipalities of San Gabriel, Santol and Sudipen)
- Mountain Province

== History ==
Lepanto-Bontoc was created on May 28, 1902, through Act No. 410 of the Philippine Commission. Included in the new province's territory were the Spanish-era comandancias of Amburayan, Bontoc and Lepanto, which became its three component sub-provinces. By virtue of the same law, the comandancia of Bontoc, upon its conversion into a sub-province, annexed all unassigned territories to its north which lay between the eastern boundaries of Abra and western boundaries of Cagayan. This territory, corresponding to the lower Chico River basin, was later organized into the sub-province of Kalinga through Act No. 1642, enacted on May 9, 1907.

The province was slightly enlarged when Tagudin, the coastal town at the mouth of the Amburayan River, was detached from Ilocos Sur and made the capital of the sub-province of Amburayan on May 15, 1907, by virtue of Act No. 1646 of the Philippine Commission.

On August 18, 1908, the Philippine Legislature annexed all four of Lepanto-Bontoc's sub-provinces to the Mountain Province through Act No. 1876, effectively ending its existence as a province.
