= Amburayan =

Former administrative division of the Philippines

- Politico-military comandancia (1890–1902); Sub-province of Lepanto-Bontoc (1902–1908); Sub-province of Mountain Province (1908–1920)
- 1890–1920
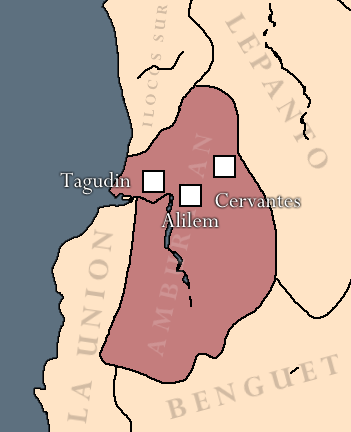
- Capital: Alilem (1890–1907); Tagudin (1907–1917); Cervantes (1917–1920)
- Area
  - Coordinates: 16°53′18″N 120°31′44″E
- Historical era: Spanish colonial period American colonial period
  - Established as a comandancia: 10 April 1890
  - Disestablished: 4 February 1920
Succeeded by
Benguet Sub-province
Ilocos Sur
La Union
- Today part of: Benguet; Ilocos Sur; La Union

Amburayan was an administrative division of the Philippines, existing as a politico-military comandancia from 1890 to 1902, and a sub-province from 1902 to 1920. Its territory encompassed most of the Amburayan River watershed, initially predominantly inhabited by the Kankanaey.

The sub-province ceased to exist when its territory was divided between Ilocos Sur, La Union, and Mountain Province (sub-province of Benguet) in 1920.

== History ==
Amburayan was established on April 10, 1890 as a politico-military comandancia by the Spanish colonial government, with the commandant stationed at Alilem. Aside from consolidating government control over the scattered Kankanaey groups in the Amburayan River watershed, the establishment of the comandancia was also intended to spur development in this hinterland area between Ilocos Sur and La Union, which was populated by upland peoples who were dependent on the Christian towns of the coast. By 1900 Amburayan had an estimated population of 30,000 "pagans" and 150 Christians, living in 34 "towns" and 76 "hamlets." The majority Kankanaey inhabitants were classified as "Igorot," while a minority that lived in the northern Sigay district were classified as Tinguian.

On May 28, 1902 through Act No. 410 of the Philippine Commission, the comandancia of Amburayan became one of the three sub-provinces of the newly created province of Lepanto-Bontoc. The designated seat of the lieutenant-governor of the sub-province was Alilem.

Amburayan was first enlarged on October 12, 1905 when the eastern hilly areas of La Union which lay north of the Cabassitan River were annexed to the sub-province by virtue of Act No. 1403. Three townships were later organized within this newly annexed territory: San Gabriel (1906), Sudipen (1906) and Santol (1908).

The sub-province was once again enlarged when Tagudin, the key trading town at the mouth of the Amburayan River, was detached from Ilocos Sur and made the capital of the sub-province on May 15, 1907 by virtue of Act No. 1646 of the Philippine Commission.

When the Philippine Legislature abolished Lepanto-Bontoc on August 18, 1908 through Act No. 1876, Amburayan became a sub-province within the newly created Mountain Province. By 1916 the sub-province consisted of the municipality of Tagudin and the townships of Alilem, Bakun, San Gabriel, Santol, Sigay, Sudipen, Sugpon, and Suyo.

With its territory having become more heavily Christianized the territory of Amburayan was greatly reduced the following year with the enactment of Act No. 2711, or the Revised Administrative Code of the Philippine Islands. The law placed under the jurisdiction of Ilocos Sur the municipality of Tagudin and the municipal districts of Alilem, Sigay, Sugpon, and Suyo. In addition the municipal districts of San Gabriel, Santol, and Sudipen were once again made part of La Union. With only the municipal district of Bakun remaining within Amburayan, the sub-province was made to share one lieutenant-governor (stationed at Cervantes) with neighboring Lepanto, becoming informally known as the sub-province of Lepanto-Amburayan.

What remained of the sub-province of Amburayan was finally abolished by the Philippine Legislature on February 4, 1920 through Act No. 2877, when the boundary between the Mountain Province and the provinces of Ilocos Sur and La Union was finally settled. The law confirmed the annexation of Amburayan's territory by Ilocos Sur and La Union, and also transferred the municipal district of Bakun (corresponding to the western half of the current municipality of the same name) to the neighboring sub-province of Benguet, Mountain Province.

== Former territory ==
At its greatest extent, Amburayan consisted of portions of the present-day provinces of:

- Benguet (western portion of the municipality of Bakun)
- Ilocos Sur (municipalities of Alilem, Sigay, Sugpon, Suyo, and Tagudin)
- La Union (municipalities of San Gabriel, Santol, and Sudipen)
