= Santa Cruz, Ilocos Sur =

Municipality in Ilocos Sur, Philippines

Santa Cruz
- Municipality
- Municipality of Santa Cruz
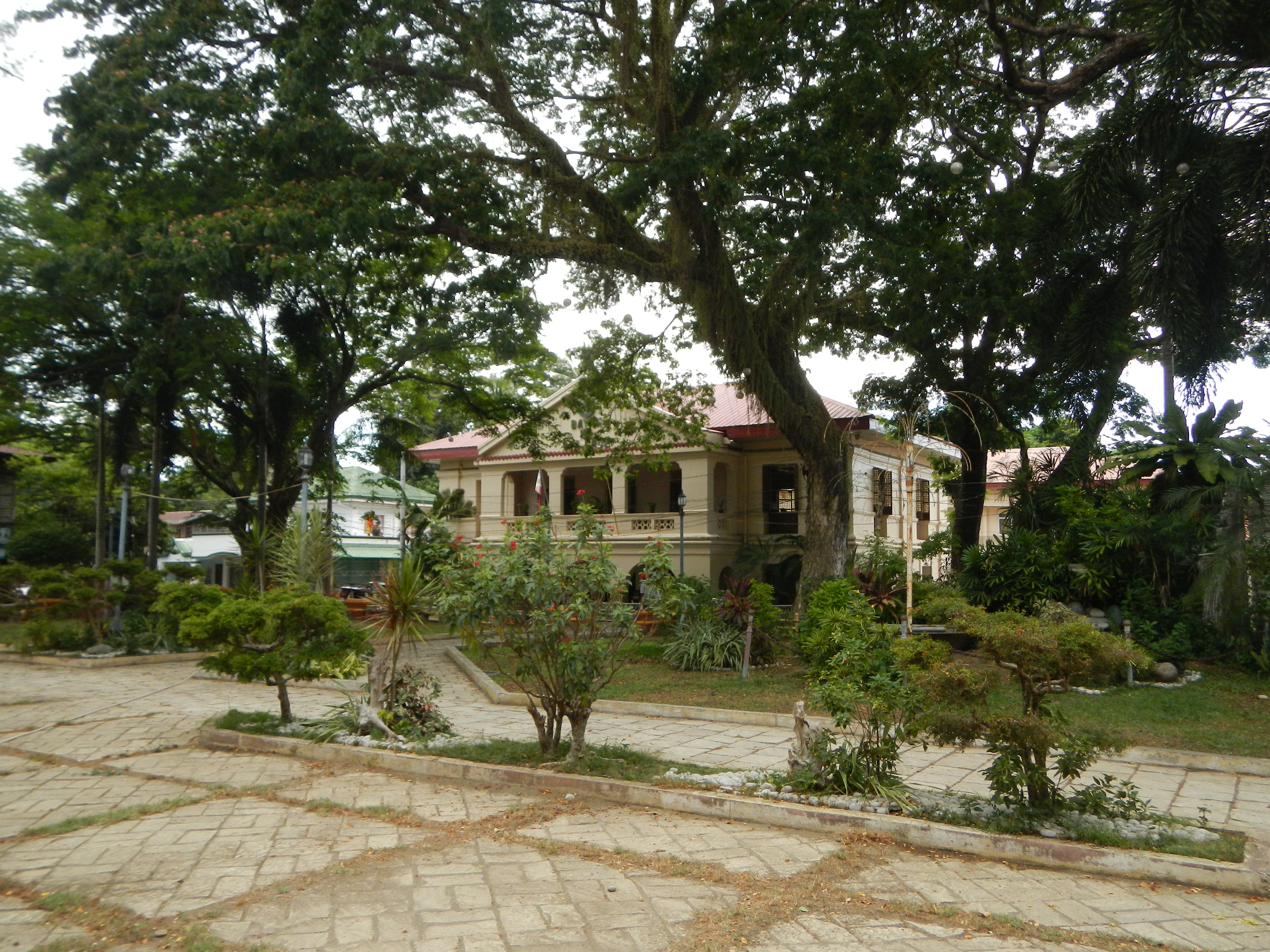
- Santa Cruz Town Plaza and Municipal Hall Immaculate Conception Parish Church Poblacion

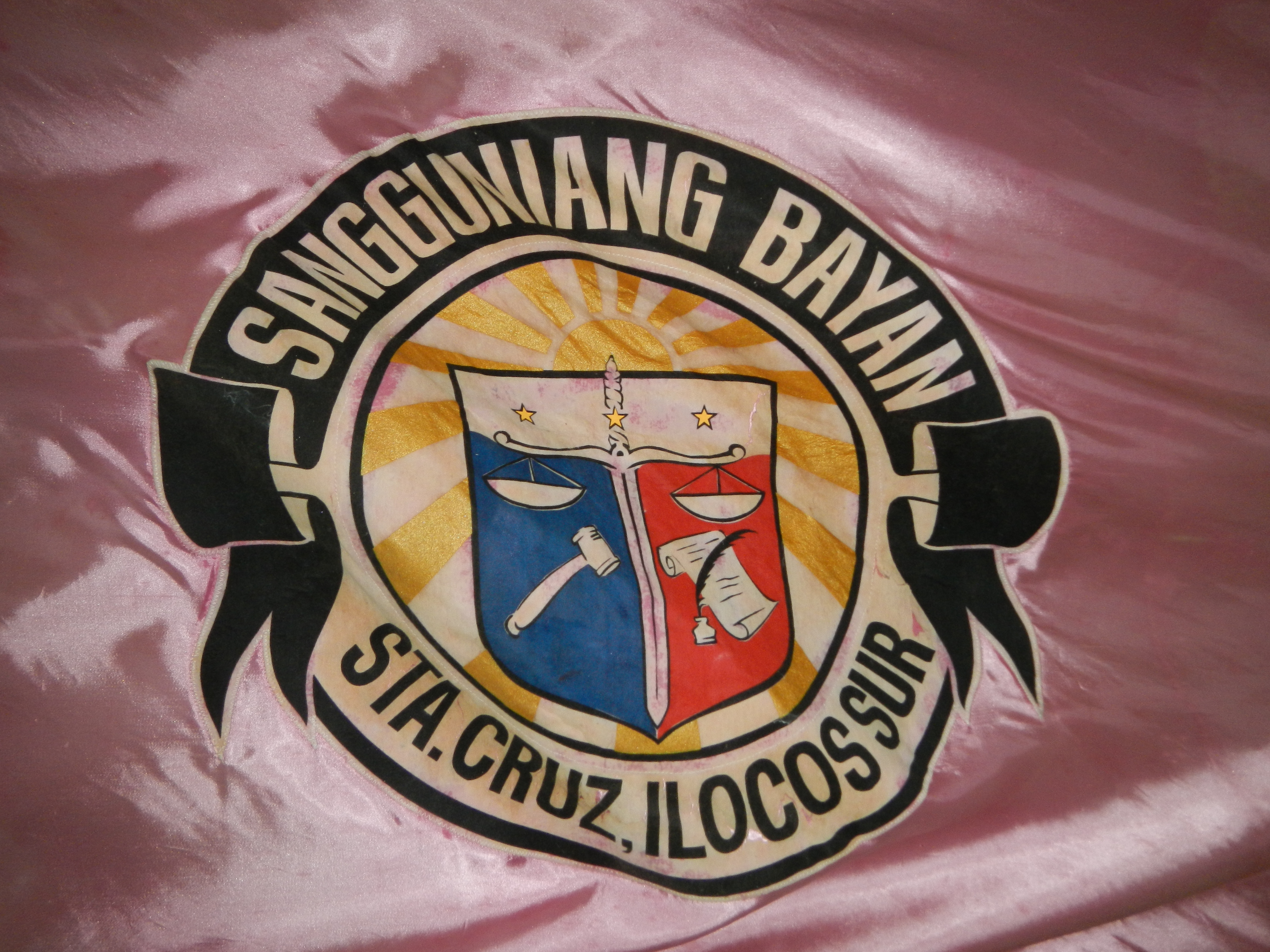
- Flag Seal

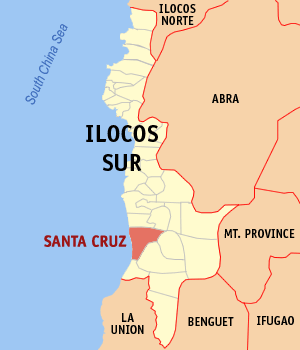
- Map of Ilocos Sur with Santa Cruz highlighted
- Interactive map of Santa Cruz
- Location within the Philippines
- Coordinates: 17°05′07″N 120°27′19″E
- Country: Philippines
- Region: Ilocos Region
- Province: Ilocos Sur
- District: 2nd district
- Barangays: 49 (see Barangays)

Government
  - Type: Sangguniang Bayan
  - Mayor: Teresita C. Valle
  - Vice Mayor: Virgilio J. Valle
  - Representative: Kristine Singson-Meehan
  - Municipal Council: Members: Cesar D. Javillonar; Jeptah Domz J. Gines; Fernando M. Javonillo Jr.; Renato A. Quilop; Nelia S. Gabuat; Benjamin A. Guieb Jr.; Carlos S. Sumbad; Rogelio J. Figuracion
  - Electorate: 26,840 voters (2025)

Area
  - Total: 88.78 km^{2} (34.28 sq mi)
- Elevation: 18 m (59 ft)
- Highest elevation: 221 m (725 ft)
- Lowest elevation: 0 m (0 ft)

Population (2024 census)
  - Total: 41,296
  - Density: 465.1/km^{2} (1,205/sq mi)
  - Households: 9,815

Economy
  - Income class: 1st municipal income class
  - Poverty incidence: 6.94% (2018)
  - Revenue: ▲PHP 963,771,690.40 million (94.25%) (2021)
  - Assets: ▲PHP 2,590,972.460.57 billion (38.22%) (2021)
  - Equity: ▲PHP 2,485,844,695.94 billion (42.61%) (2021)
  - Expenditure: ▲PHP 220,999,649.15 million (31.27%) (2021)
  - Liabilities: ▼PHP 105,127,764.63 million (-20.00%) (2021)

Service provider
  - Electricity: Ilocos Sur Electric Cooperative (ISECO)
- Time zone: UTC+8 (PST)
- ZIP code: 2713
- PSGC: 0102924000
- IDD : area code: +63 (0)77
- Native languages: Ilocano; Tagalog
- Website: stacruz-is.gov.ph

Santa Cruz (/ˈsæntə ˈkruːz/, officially the Municipality of Santa Cruz (Ilocano: Ili ti Santa Cruz; Filipino: Bayan ng Santa Cruz), is a municipality in the province of Ilocos Sur, Philippines. According to the 2024 census, it has a population of 41,296 people.

== Etymology ==
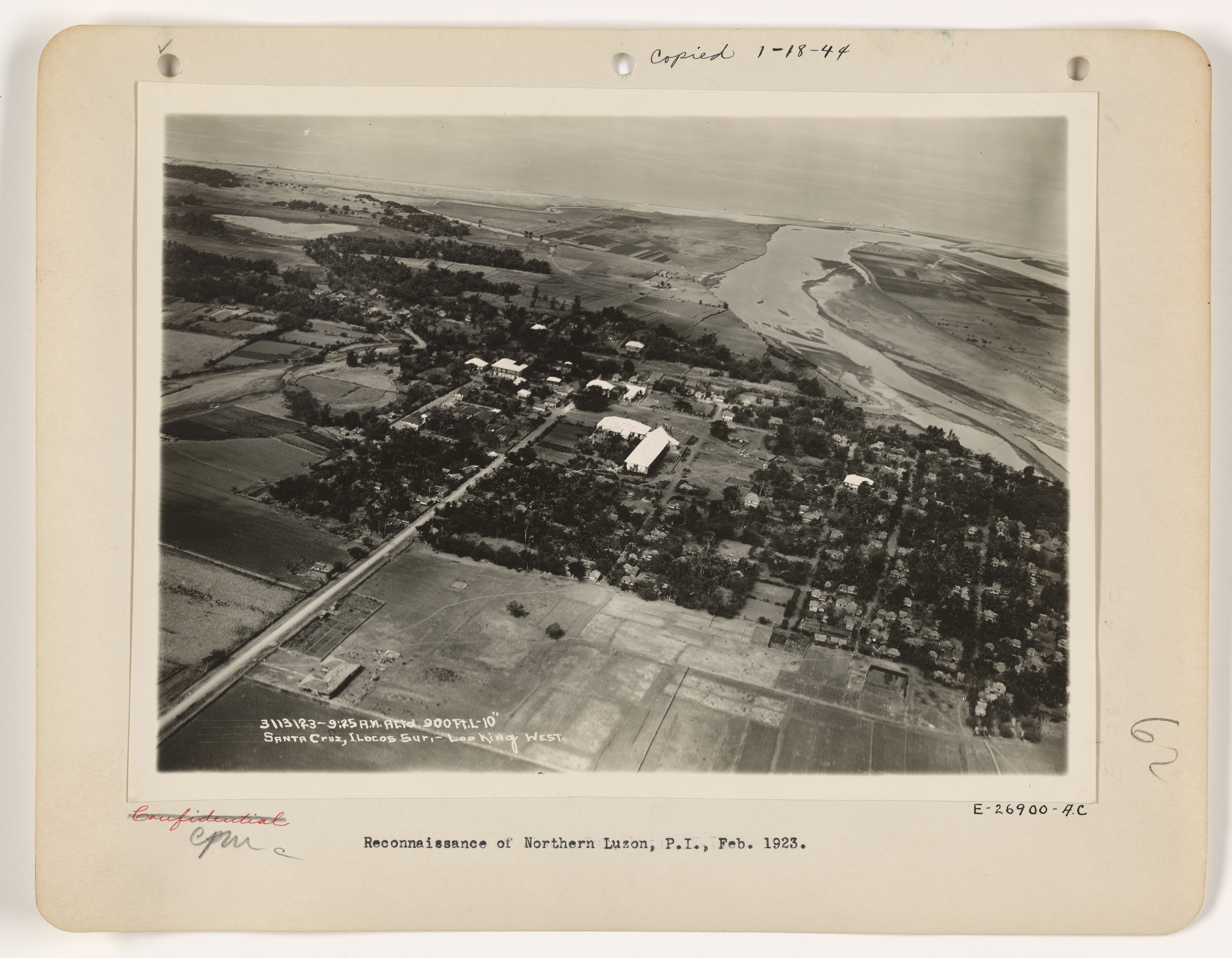
Aerial view of Santa Cruz, 1923

The place now known as Santa Cruz was the site where Captain Juan de Salcedo landed to get provisions, especially water, on his way to pacify the north. As soon as they came ashore, his men immediately went to the top of the highest sand dune and planted a big wooden cross to signify that the place has been conquered (like what they did later in Santa Catalina). This cross was visible to mariners passing by, often describing the place as "Santa Cruz." The cross may have vanished, but the name Santa Cruz stuck, especially with natives who became Christians.

== Geography ==
The Municipality of Santa Cruz is bordered by the municipalities of Santa Lucia and Salcedo to the north, Sigay and Suyo to the east, and Tagudin to the south.

Santa Cruz is situated 74.27 kilometres (46.15 mi) from the provincial capital Vigan, and 330.48 kilometres (205.35 mi) from the country's capital city of Manila.

=== Barangays ===
Santa Cruz is politically subdivided into 49 barangays. Each barangay consists of puroks and some have sitios.

- Amarao
- Babayoan
- Bacsayan
- Banay
- Bayugao Este
- Bayugao Oeste
- Besalan
- Bugbuga
- Calaoaan
- Camanggaan
- Candalican
- Capariaan
- Casilagan
- Coscosnong
- Daligan
- Dili
- Gabor Norte
- Gabor Sur
- Lalong
- Lantag
- Las-ud
- Mambog
- Mantanas
- Nagtengnga
- Padaoil
- Paratong
- Pattiqui
- Pidpid
- Pilar
- Pinipin
- Poblacion Este
- Poblacion Norte
- Poblacion Sur
- Poblacion West
- Quinfermin
- Quinsoriano
- Sagat
- San Antonio
- San Jose
- San Pedro
- Saoat
- Sevilla
- Sidaoen
- Suyo
- Tampugo
- Turod
- Villa Garcia
- Villa Hermosa
- Villa Laurencia

=== Climate ===
Climate data for Santa Cruz, Ilocos Sur
Month	Jan	Feb	Mar	Apr	May	Jun	Jul	Aug	Sep	Oct	Nov	Dec	Year
Mean daily maximum °C (°F)	30 (86)	31 (88)	33 (91)	34 (93)	32 (90)	31 (88)	30 (86)	30 (86)	30 (86)	31 (88)	31 (88)	31 (88)	31 (88)
Mean daily minimum °C (°F)	20 (68)	21 (70)	23 (73)	25 (77)	26 (79)	26 (79)	25 (77)	25 (77)	25 (77)	23 (73)	22 (72)	21 (70)	24 (74)
Average precipitation mm (inches)	27 (1.1)	31 (1.2)	40 (1.6)	71 (2.8)	207 (8.1)	237 (9.3)	286 (11.3)	261 (10.3)	261 (10.3)	254 (10.0)	88 (3.5)	46 (1.8)	1,809 (71.3)
Average rainy days	9.4	9.3	12.7	17.0	25.4	26.8	27.4	26.1	25.0	21.0	15.5	10.6	226.2
Source: Meteoblue (modeled/calculated data, not measured locally)

== Demographics ==
Population census of Santa Cruz

Year	Pop.	±% p.a.
1903	8,533	—
1918	12,672	+2.67%
1939	12,948	+0.10%
1948	13,799	+0.71%
1960	16,954	+1.73%
1970	20,459	+1.89%

Year	Pop.	±% p.a.
1975	22,688	+2.10%
1980	23,027	+0.30%
1990	28,764	+2.25%
1995	30,145	+0.88%
2000	34,433	+2.89%
2007	35,906	+0.58%

Year	Pop.	±% p.a.
2010	37,911	+2.00%
2015	39,868	+0.96%
2020	41,366	+0.78%
2024	41,296	−0.04%

Source: Philippine Statistics Authority

In the 2024 census, Santa Cruz had a population of 41,296 people. The population density was 470 inhabitants per square kilometre (1,200/sq mi).

=== Language ===
The predominant dialect spoken in Santa Cruz is Ilocano.

== Economy ==
Poverty incidence of Santa Cruz (%)

Source: Philippine Statistics Authority

== Government ==
Municipal Hall

=== Local government ===
Santa Cruz, belonging to the second congressional district of the province of Ilocos Sur, is governed by a mayor designated as its local chief executive and by a municipal council as its legislative body in accordance with the Local Government Code. The mayor, vice mayor, and the councilors are elected directly by the people through an election which is being held every three years.

=== Elected officials ===
Members of the Municipal Council (2019–2022)
Position	Name
Congressman	Kristine Singson-Meehan
Mayor	Teresita C. Valle
Vice-Mayor	Virgilio J. Valle
Councilors	Cesar D. Javillonar
Councilors	Jeptah Domz J. Gines
Councilors	Fernando M. Javonillo Jr.
Councilors	Renato A. Quilop
Councilors	Nelia S. Gabuat
Councilors	Benjamin A. Guieb Jr.
Councilors	Carlos S. Sumbad
Councilors	Rogelio J. Figuracion

== Education ==
The Sta. Cruz Schools District Office governs all educational institutions situated within the municipality.

=== Primary and elementary schools ===
- Amarao Elementary School
- Babayoan Elementary School
- Bacsayan Primary School
- Banay Primary School
- Bayugao Primary School
- Besalan Elementary School
- Calaoaan Elementary School
- Caparia-an Elementary School
- Caparia-an UMC Kiddie Center of Excellence
- Daligan Primary School
- Dili Elementary School
- Lantag Elementary School
- Linggawa Primary School
- Nagtenga Elementary School
- Padaoil Elementary School
- Pattiqui-Gabur Sur Elementary School
- Pilar Elementary School
- Pinipin Elementary School
- Quinsoriano Primary School
- Sagat Elementary School
- San Jose Elementary School
- Sevilla Elementary School
- Sidaoen Elementary School
- Sta. Cruz Central School
- Villa Hermosa Elementary School

Santa Cruz Institute

=== Secondary schools ===
- Amarao National High School
- Dili National High School
- Our Lady of Guadalupe Academy (Sevilla)
- Pascual Rivera Pimentel Memorial Academy
- San Jose High School
- Sta. Cruz Institute
