= Sigay =

Municipality in Ilocos Sur, Philippines

- Municipality
- Municipality of Sigay
- Seal

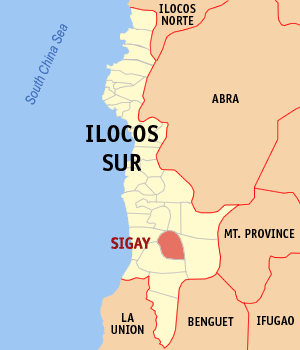
- Map of Ilocos Sur with Sigay highlighted
- Interactive map of Sigay
- Location within the Philippines
- Coordinates: 17°02′38″N 120°34′50″E
- Country: Philippines
- Region: Ilocos Region
- Province: Ilocos Sur
- District: 2nd district
- Barangays: 7 (see Barangays)

Government
  - Type: Sangguniang Bayan
  - Mayor: Carlo Crisanto P. Peredo
  - Vice Mayor: Jovita D. Garnace
  - Representative: Kristine Singson-Meehan
  - Municipal Council: Members: Bal P. Wandas; Dionisio M. Lang-ay Jr.; Aries D. Gaerlan; Mardoquio B. Caleng; Sionie W. Dilla; Jezebel G. Donglos; Fancie W. Ramolete; Benjamin L. Suen
  - Electorate: 2,106 voters (2025)

Area
  - Total: 81.55 km^{2} (31.49 sq mi)
- Elevation: 651 m (2,136 ft)
- Highest elevation: 1,552 m (5,092 ft)
- Lowest elevation: 85 m (279 ft)

Population (2024 census)
  - Total: 2,577
  - Density: 31.60/km^{2} (81.84/sq mi)
  - Households: 547

Economy
  - Income class: 1st municipal income class
  - Poverty incidence: 16.11% (2023)
  - Revenue: ₱ 29.82 million (2024)
  - Assets: ₱ 1,687 million (2024)
  - Expenditure: ₱ 97.03 million (2024)
  - Liabilities: ₱ 47.3 million (2024)

Service provider
  - Electricity: Ilocos Sur Electric Cooperative (ISECO)
- Time zone: UTC+8 (PST)
- ZIP code: 2719
- PSGC: 0102929000
- IDD : area code: +63 (0)77
- Native languages: Ilocano; Tagalog
- Website: www.sigayilocossur.com

Sigay, officially the Municipality of Sigay (Ilocano: Ili ti Sigay; Filipino: Bayan ng Sigay), is a municipality in the province of Ilocos Sur, Philippines. According to the 2024 census, it has a population of 2,577 people, making it the least populated municipality in the province.

== History ==
Natives of the town claim that Sigay is as old as any other place established by the Spanish in the province, but written records have yet to be found regarding its history. Oral tradition has it however that the name of the town originated from the Ilocano term for fish trap, "sigay". The legend goes that in the older times, Lake Ban-ao in Barangay Mabileg was once the village's most valuable source of fish. Around the area, a mudfish was caught in a fish trap by a woman who brought it to the market. A Spaniard came along and asked where she got the fish. Thinking that the stranger was asking about the gear she caught the fish with, she answered, "Sigay". It was ostensibly by this event that the town started to be known by that name.

Another version of the etymology situates the legend in a setting when the "sigay" itself had to be reinvented for hunting. In those times, the village was still made up of tribes. As was the custom, each tribe chose a leader who was ought to be the strongest, most fearless, and bravest in the clans. One of the leaders and his hunters climbed the mountains to hunt for food. Because it would then be easier to trap the animals in the forests than run after them for the kill, the hunters devised a big net in the fashion of the "sigay" (fish trap/net). Hunting thus became much easier. Because of the widespread use of the "sigay" both in the water and in the jungles, the lowland people who visited the place would eventually refer to it as Sigay.

The original settlers of Sigay were Igorots, who wandered from their ancestral lands in the Mountain Province to the northwest of the Ilocos uplands. Many of them found a home in the mountains of Sigay. Years later, the natives' descendants made vows of marriage with Ilocanas. Their offspring were born mestizos - fair skinned, red lipped, pink cheeked and brown haired - and became known as the "New Ilocanos". In the year 1700, when Christianity was introduced in the interior towns, baptized children were proclaimed as the "New Christians" or in Tagalog, the "Bago". To this day, descendants of the Igorot natives, the Bago tribes continue to live in Sigay.

Although most of the area has been modernized, there are definite traces of the native customs and beliefs. For instance, to this day, the dance "Tadek" is performed during the wedding celebrations. In many sitios, the bayanihan spirit generally prevails, especially when building houses, or during the planting and harvest seasons. However, some of the older rituals like the Kanlaw are no longer performed, unless necessary.

Many members of the Bago tribe from Sigay ventured into the municipality of Tabuk - the capital town of what was then the province of Kalinga-Apayao - in the 1940s well into the 1950s. There, they found settlements which were then exclusively made up of settlers with Sigay origin - the most notable of which is the barangay of Casigayan (with the Sigay still kept in the name), which literally means "a place of Sigay people."

=== Establishment of the Municipality ===
By the time the Spaniards arrived in the area, all the interior towns of Ilocos Sur were part of the Montanosa or the Mountain Provinces. A sub-province of Montanosa was Amburayan, a prominent area of trade and commerce, which among others, included the towns of Gregorio del Pilar, Quirino, Cervantes, Lidlidda and San Emilio. Named after the vast Amburayan River that ran through it, Amburayan was a vast stronghold of the natives; the river itself, fed by the springs from the mountains in the East, was wide, and foreign vessels used to dock there to trade with the natives. When the Spanish founded Ciudad Fernandina (Vigan), all the interior towns, including Sigay, were cut off from the Montanosa, and these became part of the Province of Ilocos Sur. The original inhabitants were natives and had the same facial features as the Igorots.

Although already fully recognized by the Spanish Regime as a municipal district in the 1800s, it was only in 1960 that Sigay emerged as a fully-fledged municipality. This came after the first elections of its local officials on November 12, 1959.

For a long time, the seat of local government resided in Abaccan. Later on, Mayor Simeon Wandas (1960–1977) decided to build a Municipal Hall in Maday-aw, where he transferred all the local government's offices.

== Geography ==
Nestled near the Cordillera mountain ranges, the Municipality of Sigay is known for its cool climate, rustic scenery, and natural attractions. Popular among nature lovers, campers, and mountaineers, Sigay draws visitors with its own version of rice terraces, the majestic Aw-asen Falls standing at 142 feet (43 meters), a kilometer-long hanging bridge, and rivers that enhance its serene landscape.

The town is bordered by Gregorio del Pilar to the north, Suyo to the south, Quirino to the east, and Santa Cruz to the west. It is accessible via a 1.5-hour drive from Candon City through 30 kilometers of mixed terrain—22 km of concrete roads and 8 km of rugged paths that traverse mountain trails and river crossings. During the rainy season, swollen rivers and slippery roads often isolate the town, prompting residents to travel on foot. It is situated in a broad mountainous region, with much of its forests remaining untouched. It is bounded by the Quinibor River to the north, and the Ida and Suyo Rivers to the south. The municipality’s soil type is well-suited for diversified farming, supporting its primarily agricultural economy. The town has a total land area of 80.28 km^{2}. comprising seven barangays.

Sigay is situated 112.85 kilometres (70.12 mi) from the provincial capital Vigan, and 342.82 kilometres (213.02 mi) from the country's capital city of Manila.

=== Barangays ===
Sigay is politically subdivided into 7 barangays. Each barangay consists of puroks and some have sitios.

- Abaccan
- Mabileg
- Matallucod
- Poblacion (Madayaw)
- San Elias
- San Ramon
- Santo Rosario

=== Climate ===
Climate data for Sigay, Ilocos Sur
Month	Jan	Feb	Mar	Apr	May	Jun	Jul	Aug	Sep	Oct	Nov	Dec	Year
Mean daily maximum °C (°F)	27 (81)	28 (82)	30 (86)	31 (88)	29 (84)	28 (82)	27 (81)	27 (81)	27 (81)	28 (82)	28 (82)	28 (82)	28 (83)
Mean daily minimum °C (°F)	17 (63)	18 (64)	20 (68)	22 (72)	23 (73)	23 (73)	22 (72)	22 (72)	22 (72)	20 (68)	19 (66)	18 (64)	21 (69)
Average precipitation mm (inches)	27 (1.1)	31 (1.2)	40 (1.6)	71 (2.8)	207 (8.1)	237 (9.3)	286 (11.3)	261 (10.3)	261 (10.3)	254 (10.0)	88 (3.5)	46 (1.8)	1,809 (71.3)
Average rainy days	9.4	9.3	12.7	17.0	25.4	26.8	27.4	26.1	25.0	21.0	15.5	10.6	226.2
Source: Meteoblue (modeled/calculated data, not measured locally)

The climate pattern of Sigay has two pronounced season, wet and dry season. The type of season is very common not only in the nearby towns but in the entire region as well. The wet or rainy season is from the months of June to October and dry season is from the months November to May. The place is cold throughout the year due to the altitude of the town. The coldest months are from November to February.

== Demographics ==
Population census of Sigay

Year	Pop.	±% p.a.
1903	11	—
1918	1,036	+35.39%
1939	1,655	+2.26%
1948	1,571	−0.58%
1960	1,371	−1.13%

Year	Pop.	±% p.a.
1970	1,475	+0.73%
1980	1,741	+1.67%
1990	1,964	+1.21%
1995	2,235	+2.45%
2000	2,375	+1.31%

Year	Pop.	±% p.a.
2007	2,453	+0.45%
2010	2,419	−0.51%
2015	2,737	+2.38%
2020	2,552	−1.46%
2024	2,577	+0.23%

Source: Philippine Statistics Authority

In the 2024 census, Sigay had a population of 2,577 people. The population density was 32 inhabitants per square kilometre (83/sq mi).

According to the Spanish census conducted by Augustinian missionaries in 1892, Sigay had a robust population 4,103 when it was consolidated under the Mission of Cabaccán in the Politico-Military Comandancia of Amburayan. It further grew into 4, 203 under the official Spanish census of 1896.

The American Census of 1903 only surveyed the Christian populations in the district of Amburayan where Sigay only had 11. This left people assuming that Sigay started with 11 residents.

=== Language ===
The language used by the residents in the place is purely Ilocano, although many residents, specially the youth can understand and speak English and Tagalog.

=== Religion ===
The Roman Catholic faith is practiced by the majority of the population while the remaining faiths include those of Protestant churches such as the United Church of Christ in the Philippines, The Way of Salvation, Seventh Day Adventist, the Assemblies of God, and Jehovah's Witnesses.

== Economy ==
Poverty incidence of Sigay (%)

Source: Philippine Statistics Authority

The town of Sigay is predominantly an agricultural municipality. Though the area is rugged and mountainous, it has a wide level of areas suited for agriculture. Most residents raise crops like tobacco and coffee which are their main products and primary sources of livelihood.

The town has no public market up to the present so residents need to transport their farm products to the lowlands for proper disposal and convert it into cash to buy their some basic needs especially during rainy season.

== Government ==
=== Local government ===
Sigay, belonging to the second congressional district of the province of Ilocos Sur, is governed by a mayor designated as its local chief executive and by a municipal council as its legislative body in accordance with the Local Government Code. The mayor, vice mayor, and the councilors are elected directly by the people through an election which is being held every three years.

=== Elected officials ===
Members of the Municipal Council (2019–2022)
Position	Name
Congressman	Kristine Singson-Meehan
Mayor	Carlo Crisanto P. Peredo
Vice-Mayor	Jovita D. Garnace
Councilors	Bal P. Wandas
Councilors	Dionisio M. Lang-ay Jr.
Councilors	Aries D. Gaerlan
Councilors	Mardoquio B. Caleng
Councilors	Sionie W. Dilla
Councilors	Jezebel G. Donglos
Councilors	Fancie W. Ramolete
Councilors	Benjamin L. Suen

== Education ==
The Salcedo-Galimuyod-Sigay-Del Pilar Schools District Office governs all private and public schools within the municipality of Sigay. The Schools District Office (SDO) also oversees the operations of all schools situated in Salcedo, Galimuyod, and Gregorio del Pilar.

The municipality has seven schools including the Secondary School. There are two primaries which are situated at Barangay Mabileg and Barangay Matallucod while there are four elementary schools. One is Sigay Central School situated at Barangay San Ramon. Another is Abaccan Elementary School and the other two are San Elias Elementary School and Santo Rosario Elementary School. The secondary school is located at Poblacion which is now on its 8th year of operation.

=== Primary and elementary schools ===
- Abaccan Integrated School
- Mabileg Primary School
- Matallucod Primary School
- Namatingan Primary School
- San Elias Elementary School
- Sigay Central School
- Sto. Rosario Elementary School

=== Secondary school ===
- Sigay National High School
