= Nagbukel =

Municipality in Ilocos Sur, Philippines

- Municipality
- Municipality of Nagbukel
- Seal

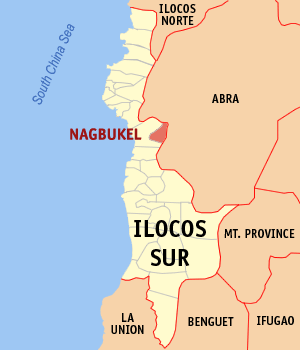
- Map of Ilocos Sur with Nagbukel highlighted
- Interactive map of Nagbukel
- Location within the Philippines
- Coordinates: 17°26′49″N 120°31′31″E
- Country: Philippines
- Region: Ilocos Region
- Province: Ilocos Sur
- District: 2nd district
- Founded: 1896
- Barangays: 12 (see Barangays)

Government
  - Type: Sangguniang Bayan
  - Mayor: Amalia C. Cabrera
  - Vice Mayor: Randolf John C. Cabrera
  - Representative: Kristine Singson-Meehan
  - Municipal Council: Members: Alicia B. Sambajon; Orlando C. Cabang; Virgilio A. Baguang; Carlo R. Pascua; Oscar B. Cabunoc; Loida A. Tumbaga; Merlyn C. Domingo; Zenaida M. Montante
  - Electorate: 4,026 voters (2025)

Area
  - Total: 43.12 km^{2} (16.65 sq mi)
- Elevation: 87 m (285 ft)
- Highest elevation: 547 m (1,795 ft)
- Lowest elevation: 4 m (13 ft)

Population (2024 census)
  - Total: 5,370
  - Density: 125/km^{2} (323/sq mi)
  - Households: 1,361

Economy
  - Income class: 1st municipal income class
  - Poverty incidence: 6.58% (2023)
  - Revenue: ₱ 366.1 million (2024)
  - Assets: ₱ 1,588 million (2024)
  - Expenditure: ₱ 171.2 million (2024)
  - Liabilities: ₱ 24.16 million (2024)

Service provider
  - Electricity: Ilocos Sur Electric Cooperative (ISECO)
- Time zone: UTC+8 (PST)
- ZIP code: 2725
- PSGC: 0102913000
- IDD : area code: +63 (0)77
- Native languages: Ilocano; Tagalog
- Website: www.nagbukel.gov.ph

Nagbukel, officially the Municipality of Nagbukel (Ilocano: Ili ti Nagbukel; Filipino: Bayan ng Nagbukel), is a municipality in the province of Ilocos Sur, Philippines. According to the 2024 census, it has a population of 5,370 people.

== Etymology ==
The name of the municipality is thought to have come from the round shape of one of the hills in the area. People in the area would utter, "Anian nga nagbukel" (Ilocano meaning "How round it is.").

Another origin of the municipality's name comes from three small hills in the southern part of the municipality.

Still another origin of the town's name comes from the irregular distribution of the barangays of Nagbukel and nearby Narvacan. Negotiations were made in such a way that the place east of the Kayapa River become part of Nagbukel and places west of the river become part of Narvacan. The distance from north to south was equal to the distance from east to west. The resulting area is round, hence the name "Nagbukel."

== History ==
The barrios that compose the municipality today were formerly a part of Narvacan. However, in 1896, Nagbukel became a town under the Spanish colonial government. It was only in 1899 that the town became a regular municipality.

== Geography ==
Nagbukel is situated 38.29 kilometres (23.79 mi) from the provincial capital Vigan, and 379.53 kilometres (235.83 mi) from the country's capital city of Manila.

=== Barangays ===
Nagbukel is politically subdivided into 12 barangays. Each barangay consists of puroks and some have sitios.

- Balaweg
- Bandril
- Bantugo
- Cadacad
- Casilagan
- Casocos
- Lapting
- Mapisi
- Mission
- Poblacion East
- Poblacion West
- Taleb

=== Climate ===
Climate data for Nagbukel, Ilocos Sur
| Month | Jan | Feb | Mar | Apr | May | Jun | Jul | Aug | Sep | Oct | Nov | Dec | Year |
|---|---|---|---|---|---|---|---|---|---|---|---|---|---|
| Mean daily maximum °C (°F) | 30 (86) | 31 (88) | 33 (91) | 34 (93) | 32 (90) | 31 (88) | 30 (86) | 30 (86) | 30 (86) | 31 (88) | 31 (88) | 30 (86) | 31 (88) |
| Mean daily minimum °C (°F) | 19 (66) | 19 (66) | 21 (70) | 23 (73) | 24 (75) | 25 (77) | 24 (75) | 24 (75) | 24 (75) | 22 (72) | 21 (70) | 19 (66) | 22 (72) |
| Average precipitation mm (inches) | 10 (0.4) | 10 (0.4) | 14 (0.6) | 23 (0.9) | 80 (3.1) | 103 (4.1) | 121 (4.8) | 111 (4.4) | 119 (4.7) | 144 (5.7) | 39 (1.5) | 15 (0.6) | 789 (31.2) |
| Average rainy days | 5.2 | 3.9 | 6.2 | 9.1 | 18.5 | 21.4 | 22.9 | 19.8 | 19.8 | 16.2 | 10.5 | 6.1 | 159.6 |
Source: Meteoblue (modeled/calculated data, not measured locally)

== Demographics ==
Population census of Nagbukel

| Year | Pop. | ±% p.a. |
|---|---|---|
| 1918 | 1,979 | — |
| 1939 | 2,497 | +1.11% |
| 1948 | 2,345 | −0.70% |
| 1960 | 2,874 | +1.71% |
| 1970 | 2,978 | +0.36% |

| Year | Pop. | ±% p.a. |
|---|---|---|
| 1975 | 3,226 | +1.62% |
| 1980 | 3,539 | +1.87% |
| 1990 | 3,806 | +0.73% |
| 1995 | 4,124 | +1.51% |
| 2000 | 4,671 | +2.71% |

| Year | Pop. | ±% p.a. |
|---|---|---|
| 2007 | 4,764 | +0.27% |
| 2010 | 4,938 | +1.31% |
| 2015 | 5,259 | +1.21% |
| 2020 | 5,465 | +0.81% |
| 2024 | 5,370 | −0.42% |

Source: Philippine Statistics Authority

In the 2024 census, Nagbukel had a population of 5,370 people. The population density was 120 inhabitants per square kilometre (310/sq mi).

== Economy ==
Poverty incidence of Nagbukel (%)

Source: Philippine Statistics Authority

The main economic source of Nagbukel is agriculture. Farmers produce rice, tobacco, and corn.

== Government ==
=== Local government ===
Nagbukel, belonging to the second congressional district of the province of Ilocos Sur, is governed by a mayor designated as its local chief executive and by a municipal council as its legislative body in accordance with the Local Government Code. The mayor, vice mayor, and the councilors are elected directly by the people through an election which is being held every three years.

=== Elected officials ===
Members of the Municipal Council (2025–2028)
| Position | Name |
|---|---|
| Congressman | Kristine Singson-Meehan |
| Mayor | Randolf John C. Cabrera |
| Vice-Mayor | Michael Angelo C. Cabrera |
| Councilors | Virgilio A. Baguang |
| Councilors | Loida A. Tumbaga |
| Councilors | Mario Jose C. Sambajon |
| Councilors | Ernesto D. Corrales Jr. |
| Councilors | Ruben S. Montante |
| Councilors | Carlo R. Pascua |
| Councilors | Joel C. Almazan |
| Councilors | Merlyn C. Domingo |

== Education ==
All educational institutions within the municipality of Nagbukel are managed by the Department of Education. These are governed and managed by schools district offices located in Narvacan, a nearby town, namely Navacan North Schools District Office, and Narvacan South Schools District Office.

=== Primary and elementary schools ===
- Bandril Primary School
- Cadacad Elementary School
- Lapting Elementary School
- Mapisi Primary School
- Nagbukel Central School
- Tadao Elementary School
- Taleb Elementary School

=== Secondary schools ===
- Bantugo-Mission Integrated School
- Nagbukel National High School
