= Ilocos Sur's 2nd congressional district =

Legislative district of the Philippines

- Constituency for the House of Representatives of the Philippines
- Location of Ilocos Sur within the Philippines
- Province: Ilocos Sur
- Region: Ilocos Region
- Population: 407,676 (2020)
- Electorate: 239,376 (2016)
- Major settlements: 23 LGUs: Cities; Candon; Municipalities; Alilem; Banayoyo; Burgos; Cervantes; Galimuyod; Gregorio del Pilar; Lidlidda; Nagbukel; Narvacan; Quirino; Salcedo; San Emilio; San Esteban; Santa; Santa Cruz; Santa Lucia; Santa Maria; Santiago; Sigay; Sugpon; Suyo; Tagudin
- Area: 2,077.27 km^{2} (802.04 sq mi)

Current constituency
- Created: 1907
- Representative: Kristine Singson-Meehan
- Political party: NPC; Bileg
- Congressional bloc: Majority

Ilocos Sur's 2nd congressional district is one of the two congressional districts of the Philippines in the province of Ilocos Sur. It has been represented in the House of Representatives of the Philippines since 1916 and earlier in the Philippine Assembly from 1907 to 1916. The district consists of the city of Candon and adjacent municipalities of Alilem, Banayoyo, Burgos, Cervantes, Galimuyod, Gregorio del Pilar, Lidlidda, Nagbukel, Narvacan, Quirino, Salcedo, San Emilio, San Esteban, Santa, Santa Cruz, Santa Lucia, Santa Maria, Santiago, Sigay, Sugpon, Suyo and Tagudin. Santa became part of the district in 1919, after the creation of Abra that led to the dissolution of the 3rd district. It is currently represented in the 20th Congress by Kristine Singson-Meehan of the Nationalist People's Coalition and Bileg Ti Ilokano.

== Representation history ==
#	Image	Member	Term of office		Legislature	Party	Electoral history	Constituent LGUs
#	Image	Member	Start	End	Legislature	Party	Electoral history	Constituent LGUs
=== Ilocos Sur's 2nd district for the Philippine Assembly ===
District created January 9, 1907.
1		Maximino Mina	October 16, 1907	October 16, 1909	1st	Nacionalista	Elected in 1907.	1907–1912; Candon, Narvacan, Santa Cruz, Santa Lucia, Santa Maria, Santiago, Tagudin
2		José María Valle	October 16, 1909	October 16, 1912	2nd	Progresista	Elected in 1909.	1907–1912; Candon, Narvacan, Santa Cruz, Santa Lucia, Santa Maria, Santiago, Tagudin
3		Gregorio Talavera	October 16, 1912	October 16, 1916	3rd	Progresista	Elected in 1912.	1912–1916; Candon, Narvacan, San Esteban, Santa Cruz, Santa Lucia, Santa Maria, Santiago, Tagudin
=== Ilocos Sur's 2nd district for the House of Representatives of the Philippine Islands ===
4		Ponciano Morales	October 16, 1916	June 6, 1922	4th	Nacionalista	Elected in 1916.	1916–1919; Candon, Narvacan, San Esteban, Santa Cruz, Santa Lucia, Santa Maria, Santiago
4		Ponciano Morales	October 16, 1916	June 6, 1922	5th	Nacionalista	Re-elected in 1919.	1919–1922; Banayoyo, Candon, Lidlidda, Nagbukel, Narvacan, San Esteban, Santa, Santa Cruz, Santa Lucia, Santa Maria, Santiago
5		Lupo T. Biteng	June 6, 1922	June 5, 1928	6th	Nacionalista; Colectivista	Elected in 1922.	1922–1935; Banayoyo, Bauguen, Burgos, Candon, Galimuyod, Lidlidda, Nagbukel, Narvacan, San Esteban, Santa, Santa Cruz, Santa Lucia, Santa Maria, Santiago
5		Lupo T. Biteng	June 6, 1922	June 5, 1928	7th	Nacionalista; Consolidado	Re-elected in 1925.	1922–1935; Banayoyo, Bauguen, Burgos, Candon, Galimuyod, Lidlidda, Nagbukel, Narvacan, San Esteban, Santa, Santa Cruz, Santa Lucia, Santa Maria, Santiago
6		Fidel B. Villanueva	June 5, 1928	June 5, 1934	8th	Demócrata	Elected in 1928.	1922–1935; Banayoyo, Bauguen, Burgos, Candon, Galimuyod, Lidlidda, Nagbukel, Narvacan, San Esteban, Santa, Santa Cruz, Santa Lucia, Santa Maria, Santiago
6		Fidel B. Villanueva	June 5, 1928	June 5, 1934	9th	Demócrata	Re-elected in 1931.	1922–1935; Banayoyo, Bauguen, Burgos, Candon, Galimuyod, Lidlidda, Nagbukel, Narvacan, San Esteban, Santa, Santa Cruz, Santa Lucia, Santa Maria, Santiago
7		Prospero C. Sanidad	June 5, 1934	September 16, 1935	10th	Nacionalista; Democrático	Elected in 1934.	1922–1935; Banayoyo, Bauguen, Burgos, Candon, Galimuyod, Lidlidda, Nagbukel, Narvacan, San Esteban, Santa, Santa Cruz, Santa Lucia, Santa Maria, Santiago
#	Image	Member	Term of office		National Assembly	Party	Electoral history	Constituent LGUs
#	Image	Member	Start	End	National Assembly	Party	Electoral history	Constituent LGUs
=== Ilocos Sur's 2nd district for the National Assembly (Commonwealth of the Philippines) ===
8		Sixto Brillanes Sr.	September 16, 1935	December 30, 1938	1st	Nacionalista; Democrático	Elected in 1935.	1935–1941; Alilem, Angaki, Banayoyo, Bauguen, Burgos, Candon, Cervantes, Concepcion, Galimuyod, Lidlidda, Nagbukel, Narvacan, San Emilio, San Esteban, Santa, Santa Cruz, Santa Lucia, Santa Maria, Santiago, Sigay, Sugpon, Suyo, Tagudin
(7)		Prospero C. Sanidad	December 30, 1938	December 30, 1941	2nd	Nacionalista	Elected in 1938.	1935–1941; Alilem, Angaki, Banayoyo, Bauguen, Burgos, Candon, Cervantes, Concepcion, Galimuyod, Lidlidda, Nagbukel, Narvacan, San Emilio, San Esteban, Santa, Santa Cruz, Santa Lucia, Santa Maria, Santiago, Sigay, Sugpon, Suyo, Tagudin
District dissolved into the two-seat Ilocos Sur's at-large district for the National Assembly (Second Philippine Republic).
#	Image	Member	Term of office		Common wealth Congress	Party	Electoral history	Constituent LGUs
#	Image	Member	Start	End	Common wealth Congress	Party	Electoral history	Constituent LGUs
=== Ilocos Sur's 2nd district for the House of Representatives of the Commonwealth of the Philippines ===
District re-created May 24, 1945.
(7)		Prospero C. Sanidad	June 11, 1945	May 25, 1946	1st	Nacionalista	Re-elected in 1941.	1945–1946; Alilem, Angaki, Banayoyo, Bauguen, Burgos, Candon, Cervantes, Concepcion, Galimuyod, Lidlidda, Nagbukel, Narvacan, San Emilio, San Esteban, Santa, Santa Cruz, Santa Lucia, Santa Maria, Santiago, Sigay, Sugpon, Suyo, Tagudin
#	Image	Member	Term of office		Congress	Party	Electoral history	Constituent LGUs
#	Image	Member	Start	End	Congress	Party	Electoral history	Constituent LGUs
=== Ilocos Sur's 2nd district for the House of Representatives of the Philippines ===
9		Fidel B. Villanueva	May 25, 1946	December 30, 1949	1st	Liberal	Elected in 1946.	1946–1957; Alilem, Angaki, Banayoyo, Bauguen, Burgos, Candon, Cervantes, Concepcion, Galimuyod, Lidlidda, Nagbukel, Narvacan, San Emilio, San Esteban, Santa, Santa Cruz, Santa Lucia, Santa Maria, Santiago, Sigay, Sugpon, Suyo, Tagudin
10		Ricardo R. Gacula	December 30, 1949	December 30, 1957	2nd	Liberal	Elected in 1949.	1946–1957; Alilem, Angaki, Banayoyo, Bauguen, Burgos, Candon, Cervantes, Concepcion, Galimuyod, Lidlidda, Nagbukel, Narvacan, San Emilio, San Esteban, Santa, Santa Cruz, Santa Lucia, Santa Maria, Santiago, Sigay, Sugpon, Suyo, Tagudin
10		Ricardo R. Gacula	December 30, 1949	December 30, 1957	3rd	Liberal	Re-elected in 1953.	1946–1957; Alilem, Angaki, Banayoyo, Bauguen, Burgos, Candon, Cervantes, Concepcion, Galimuyod, Lidlidda, Nagbukel, Narvacan, San Emilio, San Esteban, Santa, Santa Cruz, Santa Lucia, Santa Maria, Santiago, Sigay, Sugpon, Suyo, Tagudin
11		Godofredo S. Reyes	December 30, 1957	January 25, 1960	4th	Nacionalista	Elected in 1957. Resigned on election as Ilocos Sur governor.	1957–1965; Alilem, Angaki, Banayoyo, Burgos, Candon, Cervantes, Galimuyod, Gregorio del Pilar, Lidlidda, Nagbukel, Narvacan, Salcedo, San Emilio, San Esteban, Santa, Santa Cruz, Santa Lucia, Santa Maria, Santiago, Sigay, Sugpon, Suyo, Tagudin
12		Pablo C. Sanidad	December 30, 1961	December 30, 1965	5th	Liberal	Elected in 1961.	1957–1965; Alilem, Angaki, Banayoyo, Burgos, Candon, Cervantes, Galimuyod, Gregorio del Pilar, Lidlidda, Nagbukel, Narvacan, Salcedo, San Emilio, San Esteban, Santa, Santa Cruz, Santa Lucia, Santa Maria, Santiago, Sigay, Sugpon, Suyo, Tagudin
12		Pablo C. Sanidad	January 27, 1969	December 30, 1969	6th	Liberal	Re-elected in 1965. Oath of office deferred due to electoral protest.	1965–1972; Alilem, Banayoyo, Burgos, Candon, Cervantes, Galimuyod, Gregorio del Pilar, Lidlidda, Nagbukel, Narvacan, Quirino, Salcedo, San Emilio, San Esteban, Santa, Santa Cruz, Santa Lucia, Santa Maria, Santiago, Sigay, Sugpon, Suyo, Tagudin
13		Lucas V. Cauton	December 30, 1969	September 23, 1972	7th	Nacionalista	Elected in 1969. Removed from officer after imposition of martial law.	1965–1972; Alilem, Banayoyo, Burgos, Candon, Cervantes, Galimuyod, Gregorio del Pilar, Lidlidda, Nagbukel, Narvacan, Quirino, Salcedo, San Emilio, San Esteban, Santa, Santa Cruz, Santa Lucia, Santa Maria, Santiago, Sigay, Sugpon, Suyo, Tagudin
District dissolved into the twelve-seat Region I's at-large district for the Interim Batasang Pambansa, followed by the two-seat Ilocos Sur's at-large district for the Regular Batasang Pambansa.
District re-created February 2, 1987.
14		Eric D. Singson	June 30, 1987	June 30, 1998	8th	Independent	Elected in 1987.	1987–present Alilem, Banayoyo, Burgos, Candon, Cervantes, Galimuyod, Gregorio del Pilar, Lidlidda, Nagbukel, Narvacan, Quirino, Salcedo, San Emilio, San Esteban, Santa, Santa Cruz, Santa Lucia, Santa Maria, Santiago, Sigay, Sugpon, Suyo, Tagudin.
14		Eric D. Singson	June 30, 1987	June 30, 1998	9th	LDP	Re-elected in 1992.	1987–present Alilem, Banayoyo, Burgos, Candon, Cervantes, Galimuyod, Gregorio del Pilar, Lidlidda, Nagbukel, Narvacan, Quirino, Salcedo, San Emilio, San Esteban, Santa, Santa Cruz, Santa Lucia, Santa Maria, Santiago, Sigay, Sugpon, Suyo, Tagudin.
14		Eric D. Singson	June 30, 1987	June 30, 1998	10th	Lakas	Re-elected in 1995.	1987–present Alilem, Banayoyo, Burgos, Candon, Cervantes, Galimuyod, Gregorio del Pilar, Lidlidda, Nagbukel, Narvacan, Quirino, Salcedo, San Emilio, San Esteban, Santa, Santa Cruz, Santa Lucia, Santa Maria, Santiago, Sigay, Sugpon, Suyo, Tagudin.
15		Grace G. Singson	June 30, 1998	June 30, 2001	11th	Lakas	Elected in 1998.	1987–present Alilem, Banayoyo, Burgos, Candon, Cervantes, Galimuyod, Gregorio del Pilar, Lidlidda, Nagbukel, Narvacan, Quirino, Salcedo, San Emilio, San Esteban, Santa, Santa Cruz, Santa Lucia, Santa Maria, Santiago, Sigay, Sugpon, Suyo, Tagudin.
(14)		Eric D. Singson	June 30, 2001	June 30, 2010	12th	Lakas	Elected in 2001.	1987–present Alilem, Banayoyo, Burgos, Candon, Cervantes, Galimuyod, Gregorio del Pilar, Lidlidda, Nagbukel, Narvacan, Quirino, Salcedo, San Emilio, San Esteban, Santa, Santa Cruz, Santa Lucia, Santa Maria, Santiago, Sigay, Sugpon, Suyo, Tagudin.
(14)		Eric D. Singson	June 30, 2001	June 30, 2010	13th	Lakas	Re-elected in 2004.	1987–present Alilem, Banayoyo, Burgos, Candon, Cervantes, Galimuyod, Gregorio del Pilar, Lidlidda, Nagbukel, Narvacan, Quirino, Salcedo, San Emilio, San Esteban, Santa, Santa Cruz, Santa Lucia, Santa Maria, Santiago, Sigay, Sugpon, Suyo, Tagudin.
(14)		Eric D. Singson	June 30, 2001	June 30, 2010	14th	Lakas	Re-elected in 2007.	1987–present Alilem, Banayoyo, Burgos, Candon, Cervantes, Galimuyod, Gregorio del Pilar, Lidlidda, Nagbukel, Narvacan, Quirino, Salcedo, San Emilio, San Esteban, Santa, Santa Cruz, Santa Lucia, Santa Maria, Santiago, Sigay, Sugpon, Suyo, Tagudin.
16		Eric G. Singson Jr.	June 30, 2010	June 30, 2013	15th	Liberal	Elected in 2010.	1987–present Alilem, Banayoyo, Burgos, Candon, Cervantes, Galimuyod, Gregorio del Pilar, Lidlidda, Nagbukel, Narvacan, Quirino, Salcedo, San Emilio, San Esteban, Santa, Santa Cruz, Santa Lucia, Santa Maria, Santiago, Sigay, Sugpon, Suyo, Tagudin.
(14)		Eric D. Singson	June 30, 2013	June 30, 2019	16th	Liberal	Elected in 2013.	1987–present Alilem, Banayoyo, Burgos, Candon, Cervantes, Galimuyod, Gregorio del Pilar, Lidlidda, Nagbukel, Narvacan, Quirino, Salcedo, San Emilio, San Esteban, Santa, Santa Cruz, Santa Lucia, Santa Maria, Santiago, Sigay, Sugpon, Suyo, Tagudin.
(14)		Eric D. Singson	June 30, 2013	June 30, 2019	17th	Bileg	Re-elected in 2016.	1987–present Alilem, Banayoyo, Burgos, Candon, Cervantes, Galimuyod, Gregorio del Pilar, Lidlidda, Nagbukel, Narvacan, Quirino, Salcedo, San Emilio, San Esteban, Santa, Santa Cruz, Santa Lucia, Santa Maria, Santiago, Sigay, Sugpon, Suyo, Tagudin.
17		Kristine Singson-Meehan	June 30, 2019	Incumbent	18th	Bileg	Elected in 2019.	1987–present Alilem, Banayoyo, Burgos, Candon, Cervantes, Galimuyod, Gregorio del Pilar, Lidlidda, Nagbukel, Narvacan, Quirino, Salcedo, San Emilio, San Esteban, Santa, Santa Cruz, Santa Lucia, Santa Maria, Santiago, Sigay, Sugpon, Suyo, Tagudin.
17		Kristine Singson-Meehan	June 30, 2019	Incumbent	19th	NPC (Bileg)	Re-elected in 2022.	1987–present Alilem, Banayoyo, Burgos, Candon, Cervantes, Galimuyod, Gregorio del Pilar, Lidlidda, Nagbukel, Narvacan, Quirino, Salcedo, San Emilio, San Esteban, Santa, Santa Cruz, Santa Lucia, Santa Maria, Santiago, Sigay, Sugpon, Suyo, Tagudin.
17		Kristine Singson-Meehan	June 30, 2019	Incumbent	20th	NPC (Bileg)	Re-elected in 2025.	1987–present Alilem, Banayoyo, Burgos, Candon, Cervantes, Galimuyod, Gregorio del Pilar, Lidlidda, Nagbukel, Narvacan, Quirino, Salcedo, San Emilio, San Esteban, Santa, Santa Cruz, Santa Lucia, Santa Maria, Santiago, Sigay, Sugpon, Suyo, Tagudin.

== Election results ==
=== 2025 ===
Candidate	Party	Votes	%
Kristine Singson-Meehan (incumbent)	Nationalist People's Coalition	163,262	68.18
Roque Verzosa Jr.	Independent	76,181	31.82
Total		239,443	100.00
Registered voters/turnout		281,472	–
Nationalist People's Coalition hold			
Source: Commission on Elections

=== 2022 ===
2022 Philippine House of Representatives elections
Party	Candidate	Votes	%
NPC	Kristine Singson-Meehan	180,555	100.00
Total votes		180,555	100.00
NPC hold			

=== 2019 ===
2019 Philippine House of Representatives elections
Party	Candidate	Votes	%
Bileg	Kristine Singson-Meehan	158,523	
PDP–Laban	Arthur Chua	18,898	
Total votes			
Bileg hold			

=== 2016 ===
2016 Philippine House of Representatives elections
Party	Candidate	Votes	%
Liberal	Eric Singson (incumbent)	158,626	
Independent	Henry Capela	9,478	
PDP–Laban	Med Balicdang	1,859	
Margin of victory			
Invalid or blank votes		37,881	
Total votes		207,844	
Liberal hold			

=== 2013 ===
2013 Philippine House of Representatives elections
Party	Candidate	Votes	%
Liberal	Eric Singson	113,667	70.13
Aksyon	Henry Capela	20,264	12.50
Margin of victory		93,403	57.63%
Invalid or blank votes		28,149	17.37
Total votes		162,080	100.00
Liberal hold			

=== 2010 ===
2010 Philippine House of Representatives elections
Party	Candidate	Votes	%
Lakas–Kampi	Eric Singson, Jr.	147,409	93.63
PMP	Edwin Antolin	7,473	4.75
Liberal	Wilfredo Cabinete	2,548	1.62
Valid ballots		157,460	84.17
Invalid or blank votes		29,612	15.88
Total votes		187,042	100.00
Lakas–Kampi hold			

== See also ==
- Legislative districts of Ilocos Sur
