= Banayoyo =

Municipality in Ilocos Sur, Philippines

- Municipality
- Municipality of Banayoyo
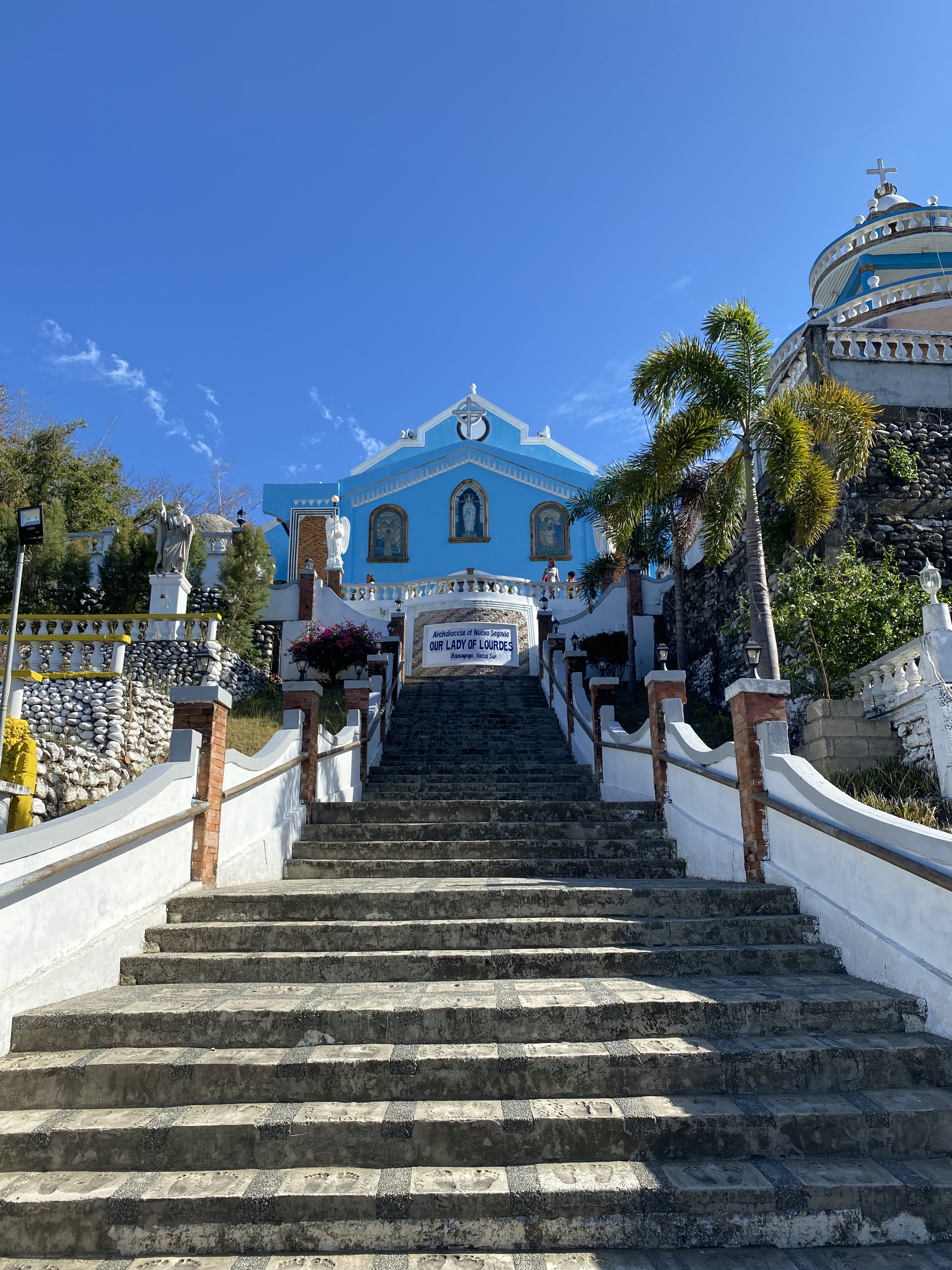
- Our Lady of Lourdes Parish Church

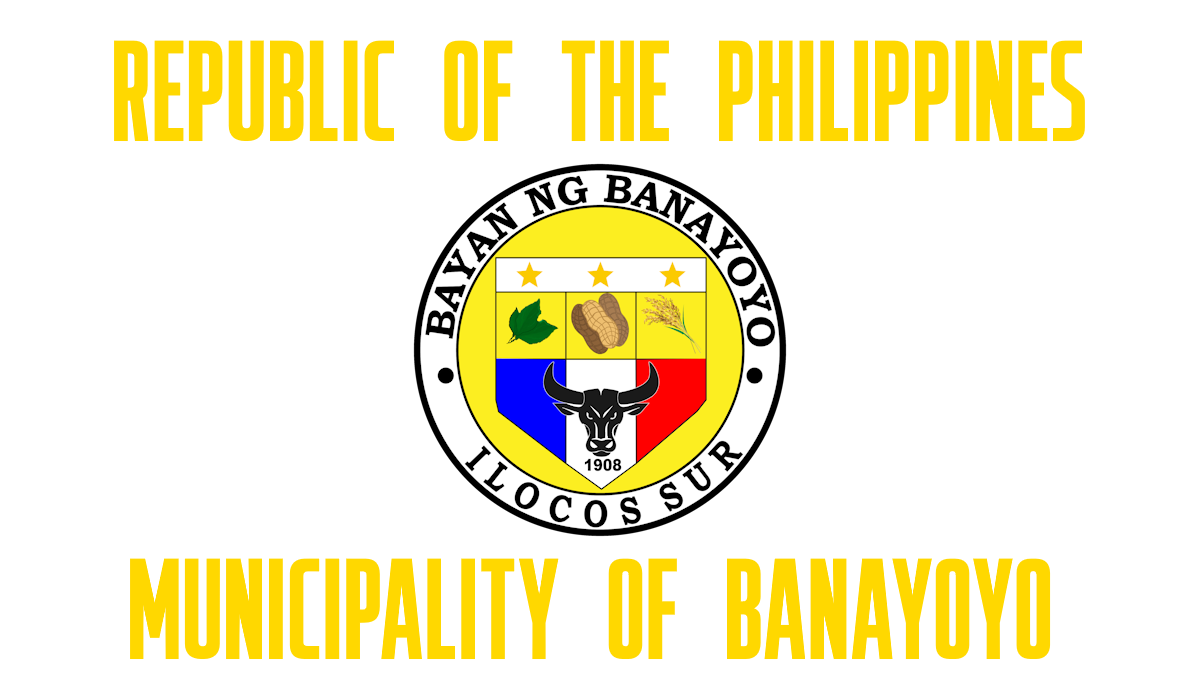
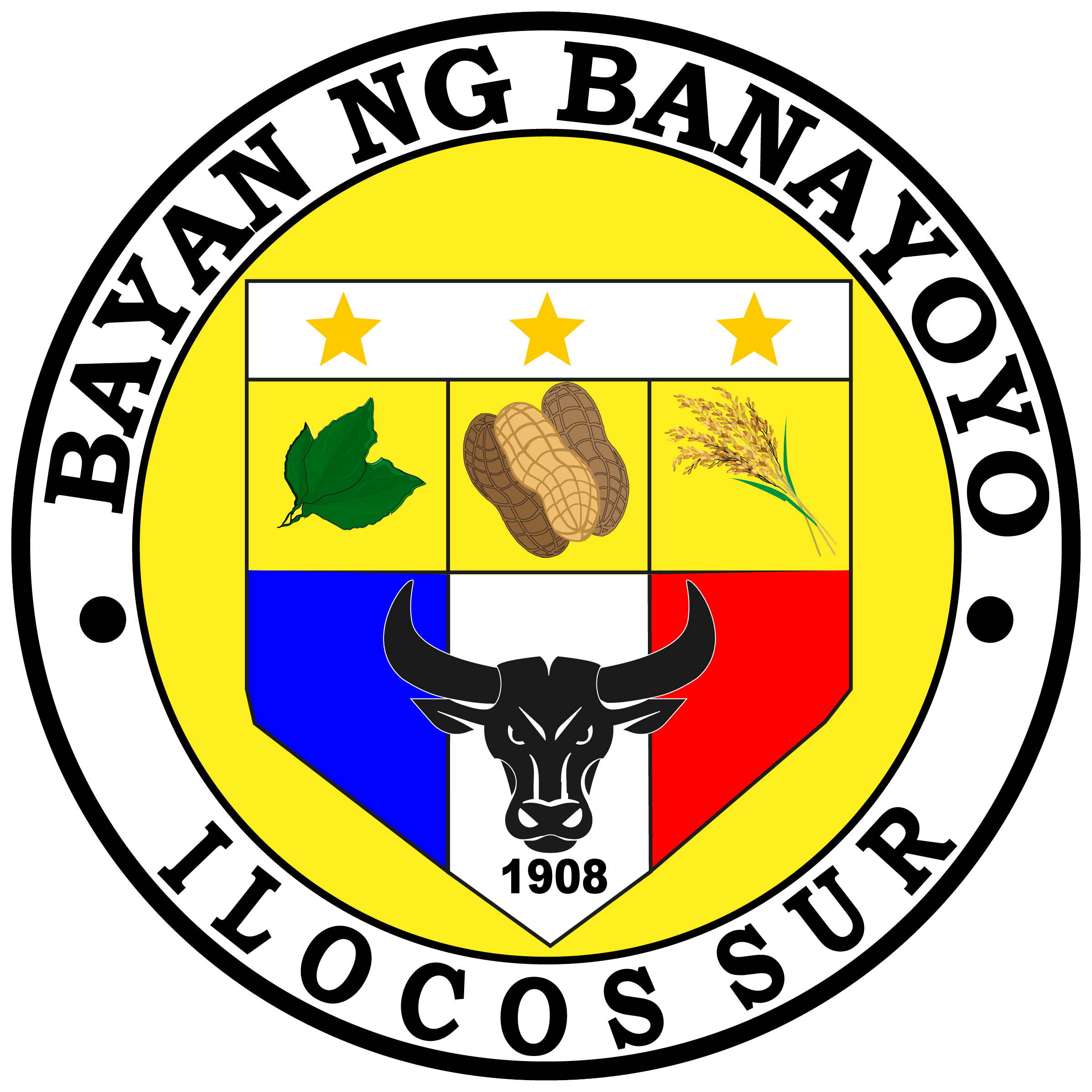
- Flag Seal
- Anthem: Banayoyo Hymn
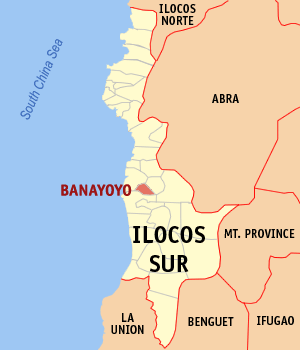
- Map of Ilocos Sur with Banayoyo highlighted
- Interactive map of Banayoyo
- Location within the Philippines
- Coordinates: 17°14′12″N 120°28′45″E
- Country: Philippines
- Region: Ilocos Region
- Province: Ilocos Sur
- District: 2nd district
- Founded: 1912
- Barangays: 14 (see Barangays)

Government
  - Type: Sangguniang Bayan
  - Mayor: Alexander G. Galanga
  - Vice Mayor: Oscar S. Gandalera Sr.
  - Representative: Kristine Singson-Meehan
  - Municipal Council: Members: Virgilio G. Galanga; Jericson G. Galanga; Venus Reginaldo; Zerdon Concepcion; Edgar Tiongson; Elmo Viernes; Roland Ramos; Richard Castillo
  - Electorate: 6,540 voters (2025)

Area
  - Total: 24.63 km^{2} (9.51 sq mi)
- Elevation: 69 m (226 ft)
- Highest elevation: 269 m (883 ft)
- Lowest elevation: 4 m (13 ft)

Population (2024 census)
  - Total: 7,953
  - Density: 322.9/km^{2} (836.3/sq mi)
  - Households: 1,929

Economy
  - Income class: 1st municipal income class
  - Poverty incidence: 5.43% (2023)
  - Revenue: ₱ 457 million (2024)
  - Assets: ₱ 2,211 million (2024)
  - Expenditure: ₱ 111.3 million (2024)

Service provider
  - Electricity: Ilocos Sur Electric Cooperative (ISECO)
- Time zone: UTC+8 (PST)
- ZIP code: 2708
- PSGC: 0102902000
- IDD : area code: +63 (0)77
- Native languages: Ilocano; Tagalog
- Website: http://banayoyo.gov.ph

Banayoyo, officially the Municipality of Banayoyo (Ilocano: Ili ti Banayoyo; Filipino: Bayan ng Banayoyo), is a municipality in the province of Ilocos Sur, Philippines. According to the 2024 census, it has a population of 7,953 people.

Settlements in the municipality are mostly established along the roads and in areas near the people's sources of livelihood. With limited economic opportunities in the municipality, some residents of the town have gone to seek higher education, better employment opportunities, and better opportunities for trade and commerce not only in other more developed areas in the country but even abroad.

== Etymology ==
The municipality of Banayoyo was originally called "Bacsayan". According to legend, in the eastern part of Poblacion, there was a big tree, which was called "Banayoyo". The people built a "Dap-ay" under the shady branches of the big tree, where the old folks held their meetings and settled any disputes or criminal acts committed by the barangay folks. After every bountiful harvest, the people gathered around the “Banayoyo” tree and offered their thanksgiving in a festivity called “Kaniaw”, with rituals lasting for three days.

Due to old age, the big "Banayoyo" tree died. The death of the big tree brought famine and drought. The calamity prompted the older folks to gather in the "Dap-ay" and change the name of the community. The people thought of a name so that the big "Banayoyo" tree will always be remembered, and called the place "Banayoyo" instead of "Bacsayan".

== History ==
=== Creation of the municipality ===
In its earliest stage, Banayoyo was a “rancheria” (or a pasture land under the Spanish regime). But as more people from the highlands of Abra called "Tinguians" came to settle, it developed into a small community.

Before Banayoyo became a separate township, during the 18th century, it was part of the municipalities of Candon and Santiago. Sources indicate that lands existing in the southern part of the town, particularly from Barangay Cadanglaan in the southwest to the Barangay Lopez in the southeast, were registered in the civil registrar at Candon, while lands in the northern part were also registered in the registrar at Santiago before they were given new declarations by the registrar of Banayoyo. It was only in 1907 when Banayoyo was established as a town that was separate from Candon and Santiago. In 1912, it became a Municipality under Ilocos Sur.

=== World War II ===
During World War II, Banayoyo was the seat of the local Philippine Commonwealth Military and Ilocano Guerilla Resistance Outfit under the command of Army Major Walter M. Cushing, a fearless American fighter. As the residents of the town supplied the outfit with provisions and financial assistance, the Japanese Imperial Army, who were then garrisoned at an old Sugar Central in nearby Bucong - a barrio of Candon - burned some of the barrios of Banayoyo down. Barangay Elefante, which was the bivouac area of the elements of “M” Company, 121st Infantry Regiment, Philippine Commonwealth Army, USAFIP NL, suffered the worst atrocities. On October 16, 1944, one half of the barrio was burned down and on November 14, 1944, the other half met the same fate. During the same dates, not only Elefante was set on fire but the whole town. Neither the Banayoyo Catholic Church nor the Municipal Hall were spared during these reprisals.

== Geography ==
The Municipality of Banayoyo is one of the 32 municipalities of Ilocos Sur. It is bounded to the south by the Bucong River, also called “Carayan a Bassit”; to the west by a small canal called “Calip”; to the east by the Cabcaburao Hills; and, to the north by Bay-asan Hills. The municipalities surrounding the town area are Lidlidda to the east, Candon to the south, Santiago to the west, and Burgos to the north.

Banayoyo is situated 58.27 kilometres (36.21 mi) from the provincial capital Vigan, and 352.47 kilometres (219.01 mi) from the country's capital city of Manila.

The municipality can be reached by jeepneys going to Lidlidda and San Emilio or tricycles from Candon.

=== Barangays ===
Banayoyo is politically subdivided into 14 barangays. Each barangay consists of puroks and some have sitios.

- Bagbagotot
- Banbanaal
- Bisangol
- Cadanglaan
- Casilagan Norte
- Casilagan Sur
- Elefante
- Guardia
- Lintic
- Lopez
- Montero
- Naguimba
- Pila
- Poblacion

=== Climate ===
Climate data for Banayoyo, Ilocos Sur
Month	Jan	Feb	Mar	Apr	May	Jun	Jul	Aug	Sep	Oct	Nov	Dec	Year
Mean daily maximum °C (°F)	30 (86)	31 (88)	32 (90)	34 (93)	32 (90)	31 (88)	30 (86)	30 (86)	30 (86)	31 (88)	31 (88)	30 (86)	31 (88)
Mean daily minimum °C (°F)	18 (64)	19 (66)	21 (70)	23 (73)	24 (75)	24 (75)	24 (75)	24 (75)	24 (75)	22 (72)	21 (70)	19 (66)	22 (71)
Average precipitation mm (inches)	10 (0.4)	10 (0.4)	14 (0.6)	23 (0.9)	80 (3.1)	103 (4.1)	121 (4.8)	111 (4.4)	119 (4.7)	144 (5.7)	39 (1.5)	15 (0.6)	789 (31.2)
Average rainy days	5.2	3.9	6.2	9.1	18.5	21.4	22.9	19.8	19.8	16.2	10.5	6.1	159.6
Source: Meteoblue (modeled/calculated data, not measured locally)

== Demographics ==
Population census of Banayoyo

Year	Pop.	±% p.a.
1918	2,313	—
1939	2,443	+0.26%
1948	2,572	+0.57%
1960	3,252	+1.97%
1970	3,970	+2.01%

Year	Pop.	±% p.a.
1975	4,585	+2.93%
1980	5,037	+1.90%
1990	5,864	+1.53%
1995	6,140	+0.87%
2000	6,728	+1.98%

Year	Pop.	±% p.a.
2007	7,149	+0.84%
2010	7,694	+2.71%
2015	7,748	+0.13%
2020	7,931	+0.49%
2024	7,953	+0.07%

Source: Philippine Statistics Authority

In the 2024 census, Banayoyo had a population of 7,953 people. The population density was 320 inhabitants per square kilometre (830/sq mi).

=== Religion ===
Many religions have been established in the municipality like Protestantism, Catholicism, Iglesia ni Cristo, Aglipayan, Jehovah's Witnesses. Many residents have been given elementary and secondary education with the establishment of several elementary schools.

== Economy ==
Poverty incidence of Banayoyo

Source: Philippine Statistics Authority

Farming forms the main economic sector in Banayoyo. Banayoyo produces rice, tobacco and bananas. Small businesses process the crops into items like banana flour, chips, and pastilyas.

== Government ==
=== Local government ===
Banayoyo, belonging to the second congressional district of the province of Ilocos Sur, is governed by a mayor designated as its local chief executive and by a municipal council as its legislative body in accordance with the Local Government Code. The mayor, vice mayor, and the councilors are elected directly by the people through an election which is being held every three years.

=== Elected officials ===
Members of the Municipal Council (2025–2028)
Position	Name
Congressman	Kristine Singson-Meehan
Mayor	Alexander G. Galanga
Vice-Mayor	Oscar S. Gandalera Sr.
Councilors	Virgilio G. Galanga
Councilors	Jericson G. Galanga
Councilors	Venus G. Reginaldo
Councilors	Zerdon G. Concepcion
Councilors	Edgar F. Tiongson
Councilors	Elmo D. Viernes
Councilors	Roland D. Ramos
Councilors	Richard A. Castillo

== Education ==
The Banayoyo-Lidlidda-San Emilio Schools District Office governs all public and private education systems. Its jurisdiction includes the Municipality of Banayoyo, including the towns of Lidlidda, and San Emilio.

=== Primary and elementary schools ===
- Bagbagotot Primary School
- Banayoyo Central School
- Banlo Elementary School
- Bay-asan Primary School
- Casilagan Elementary School
- Montero Elementary School
- Naguimba Elementary School

=== Secondary schools ===
- Banayoyo National High School
- Banayoyo United Methodist Church Child Care Center

== Socio-Economic-Cultural Development ==
Tinguians were the foremost inhabitants of the place, who came down from the highlands of Abra. With the coming of the Spaniards, Americans, Japanese, Chinese and other foreigners and people from nearby provinces of Ilocos Norte, La Union and Mountain Province, the original settlers intermingled with and intermarried with them,. At present, however, remnants of the Tinguian tribe still reside in the town.

Like before, farming is the major source of livelihood of the people. During the early period, they used crude methods of farming like plowing by the use of cows and carabaos, and tilling the soil by the hands or sticks. But with the coming of the Westerners who brought with them modern technologies, the farmers of Banayoyo have already adopted semi-mechanized methods of farming like the use of tractors, threshers, commercial fertilizers, etc.
