= Lidlidda =

Municipality in Ilocos Sur, Philippines

- Municipality
- Municipality of Lidlidda
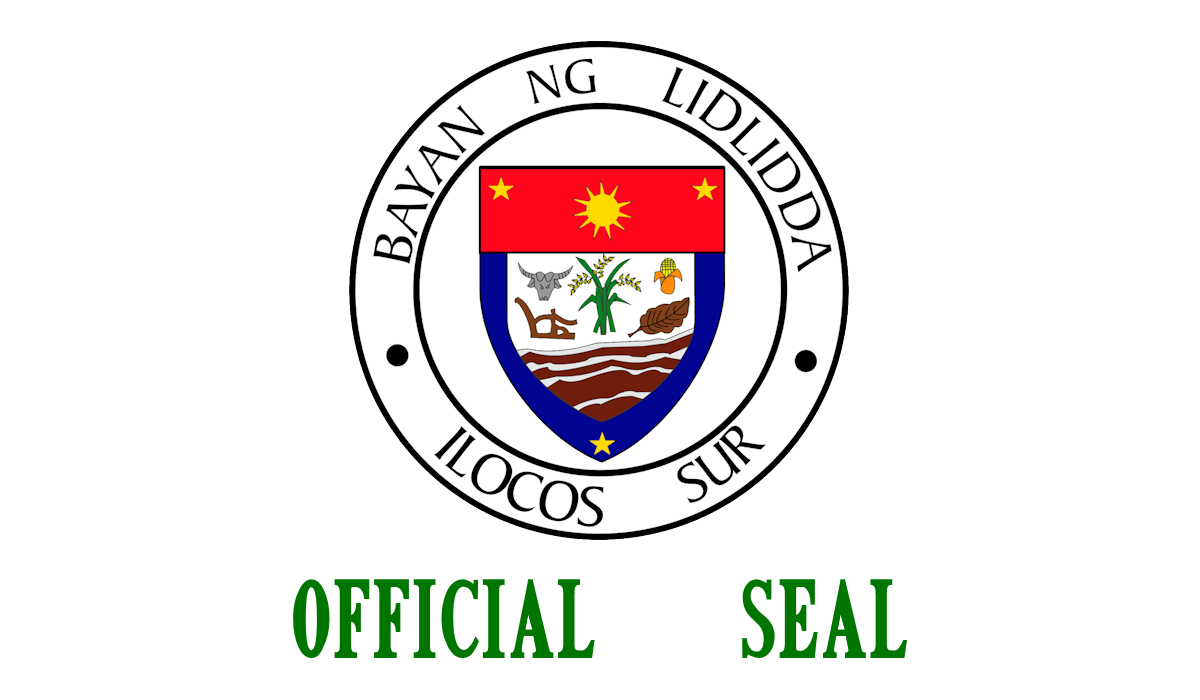
- Flag Seal

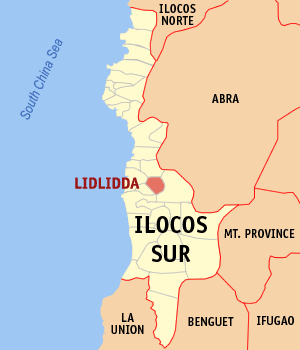
- Map of Ilocos Sur with Lidlidda highlighted
- Interactive map of Lidlidda
- Location within the Philippines
- Coordinates: 17°15′12″N 120°31′14″E
- Country: Philippines
- Region: Ilocos Region
- Province: Ilocos Sur
- District: 2nd district
- Barangays: 11 (see Barangays)

Government
  - Type: Sangguniang Bayan
  - Mayor: Sherwin P. Tomas
  - Vice Mayor: James S. Sacayanan
  - Representative: Kristine Singson-Meehan
  - Municipal Council: Members: Yacelyn A. Andres; Arsenio D. Dagdag Jr.; Marlander D. Tawali; Billy T. Guibaoan Sr.; Jose C. Badongen Jr.; George D. Arreola; Ponciano D. Bagbaguen Jr.; John U. Quidangen
  - Electorate: 3,742 voters (2025)

Area
  - Total: 33.84 km^{2} (13.07 sq mi)
- Elevation: 143 m (469 ft)
- Highest elevation: 497 m (1,631 ft)
- Lowest elevation: 19 m (62 ft)

Population (2024 census)
  - Total: 4,846
  - Density: 143.2/km^{2} (370.9/sq mi)
  - Households: 1,072

Economy
  - Income class: 1st municipal income class
  - Poverty incidence: 6.47% (2023)
  - Revenue: ₱ 474.9 million (2024)
  - Assets: ₱ 1,386 million (2024)
  - Expenditure: ₱ 118.3 million (2024)
  - Liabilities: ₱ 34.79 million (2024)

Service provider
  - Electricity: Ilocos Sur Electric Cooperative (ISECO)
- Time zone: UTC+8 (PST)
- ZIP code: 2723
- PSGC: 0102911000
- IDD : area code: +63 (0)77
- Native languages: Ilocano; Tagalog
- Website: www.lidlidda.gov.ph

Lidlidda, officially the Municipality of Lidlidda (Ilocano: Ili ti Lidlidda; Filipino: Bayan ng Lidlidda), is a municipality in the province of Ilocos Sur, Philippines. According to the 2024 census, it has a population of 4,846 people.

It is home to the Lidlidda Protected Landscape, a protected area situated in the municipality's watershed.

== History ==
In the 1800s, there lived tribes called Agsalog (Igorot) in the East Hinterlands of Golot (Mountain Province). Some groups of these people were hospitable, while some were fierce fighters, headhunters, animal rustlers, robbers, and the like which worsened the already impoverished state of their place.

Tired of such constant inconveniences, the pacifist tribes decided to leave after holding a secret meeting. They grouped themselves into three: one group to head for the north, another to the south, and the third to the west. The group that traveled to the west were the ones who reached the site of Lidlidda. Members of this group had such names as Conay, Caoas, Digay, Caoeng, San-E, Gumanab, Anggon, Calugay and others. After twenty days of hiking, they settled in a place that looked suitable for building homes - a valley with grassy plains with a river along its sides, creeks, brooks, and wells. There was plenty of fish, wild animals, and game for food. The surrounding hills and mountains were covered with tall trees and bamboo.

They made a begnas (fiesta) to express their gratitude to the god Kabunian. Three days after, they started digging and pulling the ledda (Thick tall grasses) to convert the land into rice paddies. As the population increased, residents started to search further places for resources. One time, a group of hunters saw smoke near the coast from atop of the mountains west of the place. Eager to see what was there, they hiked to the place. Suddenly they came to reach a street and houses. The people who inhabited the place were Ilokanos, who were also kind and friendly. An elderly rich man met them and told them of his great desire to visit their place to make friends and trade with them, as well as to educate and Christianize the tribe, which the latter accepted.

The rich man, along with his neighbors bundled some clothes, utensils, reading and writing materials, and went with the hunters. After a few hours, they reached the top of ‘Baggiing Hill’ where they rested. The rich man anxiously asked how far more to go. A hunter stood and said, “Sir, our home is located there at the edge of that plain covered with those ‘Adu nga Ledda’ (many thick tall grasses)”. Then, they hurried down and in a few minutes reached the place. The natives came and welcomed them with a feast.

== Geography ==
Lidlidda is situated 123.98 kilometres (77.04 mi) from the provincial capital Vigan, and 418.18 kilometres (259.85 mi) from the country's capital city of Manila.

=== Barangays ===
Lidlidda is politically subdivided into 11 barangays. Each barangay consists of puroks and some have sitios.

- Banucal
- Bequi-Walin
- Bugui
- Calungbuyan
- Carcarabasa
- Labut
- Poblacion Norte (Namatting)
- Poblacion Sur (Demang)
- San Vicente (Kamatliwan)
- Suysuyan
- Tay-ac

=== Climate ===
Climate data for Lidlidda, Ilocos Sur
Month	Jan	Feb	Mar	Apr	May	Jun	Jul	Aug	Sep	Oct	Nov	Dec	Year
Mean daily maximum °C (°F)	30 (86)	31 (88)	32 (90)	34 (93)	32 (90)	31 (88)	30 (86)	30 (86)	30 (86)	31 (88)	31 (88)	30 (86)	31 (88)
Mean daily minimum °C (°F)	19 (66)	19 (66)	21 (70)	23 (73)	24 (75)	25 (77)	24 (75)	24 (75)	24 (75)	22 (72)	21 (70)	19 (66)	22 (72)
Average precipitation mm (inches)	10 (0.4)	10 (0.4)	14 (0.6)	23 (0.9)	80 (3.1)	103 (4.1)	121 (4.8)	111 (4.4)	119 (4.7)	144 (5.7)	39 (1.5)	15 (0.6)	789 (31.2)
Average rainy days	5.2	3.9	6.2	9.1	18.5	21.4	22.9	19.8	19.8	16.2	10.5	6.1	159.6
Source: Meteoblue (modeled/calculated data, not measured locally)

== Demographics ==
Population census of Lidlidda

Year	Pop.	±% p.a.
1918	1,510	—
1939	1,638	+0.39%
1948	1,673	+0.24%
1960	1,972	+1.38%
1970	2,369	+1.85%

Year	Pop.	±% p.a.
1975	2,635	+2.16%
1980	2,736	+0.75%
1990	3,515	+2.54%
1995	3,700	+0.97%
2000	4,022	+1.80%

Year	Pop.	±% p.a.
2007	3,798	−0.79%
2010	4,398	+5.48%
2015	4,647	+1.05%
2020	4,705	+0.26%
2024	4,846	+0.71%

Source: Philippine Statistics Authority

In the 2024 census, Lidlidda had a population of 4,846. The population density was 140 inhabitants per square kilometre (360/sq mi).

== Economy ==
Poverty incidence of Lidlidda (%)

Source: Philippine Statistics Authority

Lidlidda's primary economic source is agriculture. Agricultural sources of Lidlidda include rice, vegetables, and fish.

== Government ==
=== Local government ===
Lidlidda, belonging to the second congressional district of the province of Ilocos Sur, is governed by a mayor designated as its local chief executive and by a municipal council as its legislative body in accordance with the Local Government Code. The mayor, vice mayor, and the councilors are elected directly by the people through an election which is being held every three years.

=== Elected officials ===
Members of the Municipal Council (2025–2028)
Position	Name
Congressman	Kristine Singson-Meehan
Mayor	Sherwin P. Tomas
Vice-Mayor	James S. Sacayanan
Councilors	Marlander D. Tawali
Councilors	Jimmy B. Ancheta
Councilors	Gemma M. Aguirre
Councilors	Yacelyn A. Andres
Councilors	Constante B. Segundo Jr.
Councilors	Billy T. Guibaoan
Councilors	Mark John G. Quidangen
Councilors	Ponciano D. Bagbaguen Jr.

=== List of former chief executives ===
Presidentes:

- Manog Caoas (1908–1910)
- Andan Domaoa (1911–1913)
- Miguel Segundo (1914–1916)
- Nardo Bagbaguen (1917–1919)
- Miguel Segundo (1920–1922)
- Cardo Sibanag (1923–1925)
- Salioa Salib-O (1926–1928)
- Manuel delos Santos (1929–1931)
- Bonifacio Tawali (1932–1934)
- Dan-E Segundo (1935–1937)
- Elmem Manugan (1938–1940)

Municipal Mayors:

- Basilio Bagbaguen (1941–1943)
- Andan Domaoa (1944–1947)
- Aurelio Baguso(1948–1955)
- Alejo Arola (1956–1959)
- Aurelio Baguso (1960–1967)
- Tomas Galang(1968–1971)
- Aurelio Baguso (1972–1974)
- Teodoro Ang-Oay (1974–1979)
- Romeo Baguso (1980 to May 28, 1991)
- Ponciano Segundo (May 29, 1991 to June 30, 1992)
- Jesus M. Sagay (July 1, 1992 – June 30, 2001)
- Diokno M. Galang (July 1, 2001 – June 30, 2004)
- Jesus M. Sagay (July 1, 2004 – )
- Constante Segundo Sr.(July 1, 2010 – June 30, 2013)
- Sherwin Tomas-

== Annual events ==
- Lidlidda Day Celebration- being held every 6 January featuring the various cultural songs and dances, native delicacies, indigenous games, and many more, and is actively participated by all townspeople of Lidlidda that even our folks in far places try to find time to come home to personally witness and experience the gracefulness of the celebration. This wonderful event is usually a three-day affair and now popularly known as Buyag Celebration Indeed, the folks as Bago (or Bagbag-o)is now being recognized in the Ilocos and Philippine communities through this celebration, among other Bago cultural festivities entire North Luzon (Philippines).

== Education ==
The Banayoyo-Lidlidda-San Emilio Schools District Office governs all public and private education systems. Its jurisdiction includes the Municipality of Lidlidda, including the towns of Banayoyo, and San Emilio.

=== Primary and elementary schools ===
- Banucal Elementary School
- Bequi-Walin Elementary School
- Lidlidda North Central School
- Lidlidda South Central School
- Tay-ac Elementary School
- Pentecostal Freewill Baptist Academy

=== Secondary school ===
- Lidlidda National High School
