= Alilem =

Municipality in Ilocos Sur, Philippines

- Municipality
- Municipality of Alilem
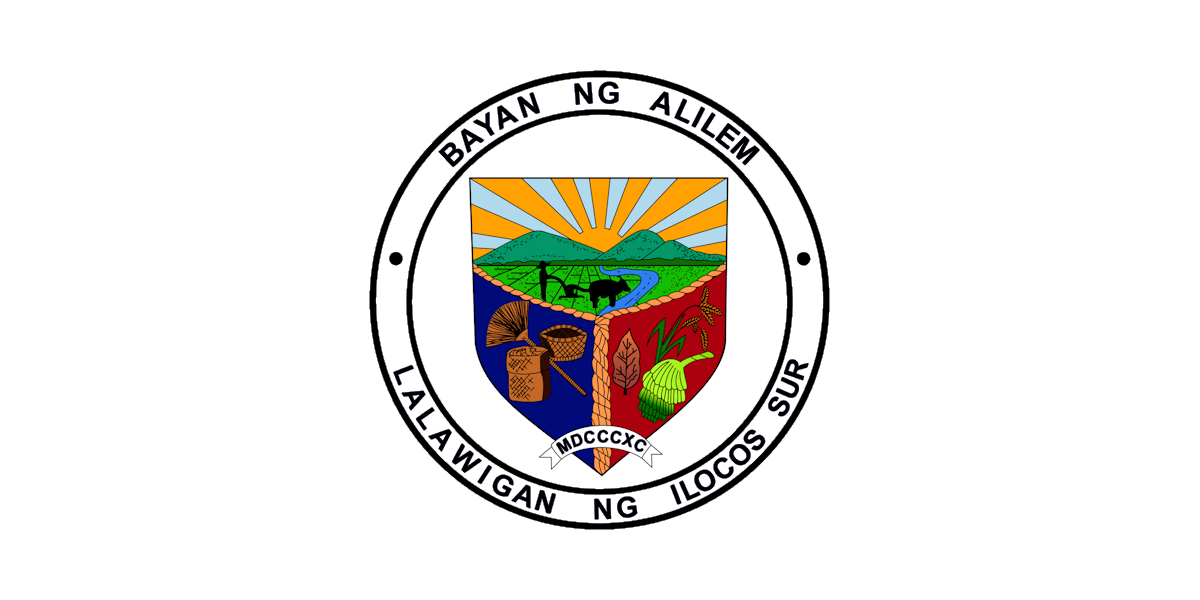
- Flag Seal
- Motto: Ali Alilem
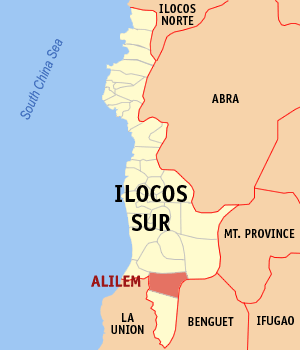
- Map of Ilocos Sur with Alilem highlighted
- Interactive map of Alilem
- Location within the Philippines
- Coordinates: 16°53′13″N 120°31′52″E
- Country: Philippines
- Region: Ilocos Region
- Province: Ilocos Sur
- District: 2nd district
- Barangays: 9 (see Barangays)

Government
  - Type: Sangguniang Bayan
  - Mayor: Mar Ruel P. Sumabat
  - Vice Mayor: Velmor P. Sumabat
  - Representative: Kristine Singson-Meehan
  - Municipal Council: Members: Tony Budao; Orlando Sanggawa; Kathrine P. Bangcod; Efren S. Colyong; Eduardo G. Mutong; Justiniano D. Lacasandile Jr.; Johnny P. Tiglao; Arvin S. Bangaoil
  - Electorate: 4,957 voters (2025)

Area
  - Total: 119.33 km^{2} (46.07 sq mi)
- Elevation: 282 m (925 ft)
- Highest elevation: 1,093 m (3,586 ft)
- Lowest elevation: 23 m (75 ft)

Population (2024 census)
  - Total: 7,736
  - Density: 64.83/km^{2} (167.9/sq mi)
  - Households: 1,648

Economy
  - Income class: 1st municipal income class
  - Poverty incidence: 9.94% (2023)
  - Revenue: ₱ 309 million (2024)
  - Assets: ₱ 972.2 million (2024)
  - Expenditure: ₱ 144.6 million (2024)
  - Liabilities: ₱ 69.41 million (2024)

Service provider
  - Electricity: Ilocos Sur Electric Cooperative (ISECO)
- Time zone: UTC+8 (PST)
- ZIP code: 2716
- PSGC: 0102901000
- IDD : area code: +63 (0)77
- Native languages: Ilocano; Tagalog

Alilem, officially the Municipality of Alilem (Ilocano: Ili ti Alilem; Filipino: Bayan ng Alilem), is a municipality in the province of Ilocos Sur, Philippines. According to the 2024 census, it has a population of 7,736 people.

== Etymology ==
Long before Spanish colonizers landed on Philippine shores, there were already natives living in the area. These people lived in huts built on the hillsides located at the northern and eastern parts of the valley. This was so because the present valley was then the course of the Bakun River.

For many years, the natives lived simply and peacefully, but were soon disturbed by an unusual and fearful occurrence in the area. It all started with the continuous heavy downpour or “lemlem” in the native dialect. This “lemlem” caused the Bakun River to swell to an extraordinary size and burst its banks. In the middle part of the river, there was a big “alicono” or whirlpool that the people feared so much. Even after the rains ceased, the ‘alicono’ remained, and the people believed that it was their god Kabunian's punishment for their sins. As it was their custom, the people performed the native ritual called “kaniaw”. The “alicono” then vanished and the Bakun River changed its course to the foot of the mountains in the southern part - leaving a dry level land suited for residential lots and farms. The people moved their homes to the valley and named the place Alilem after the “alicono” and “lemlem”.

== History ==
Accurate and reliable information on the exact date of the founding of the town cannot be secured because there are no complete historical records available. However, basing from its information gathered from the elders of the town, it could be deduced that the town of Alilem was founded sometime after 1820.

What is certainly known only is that the lay-out of the town was done by the Spaniards. During the Spanish occupation, Alilem was noted for being the center of the district government of “commandancia politico-militar” of Amburayan. This commandancia was composed of Alilem, Sigay, Suyo, Tagudin, Sudipen, San Gabriel and Bakun. In 1908, the commandancia of Amburayan became a sub-province of the newly created special capital of the sub-province until the Americans transferred the seat to Tagudin.

== Geography ==
Alilem is situated 105.77 kilometres (65.72 mi) from the provincial capital Vigan, and 319.18 kilometres (198.33 mi) from the country's capital city of Manila.

=== Barangays ===
Alilem is politically subdivided into 9 barangays. Each barangay consists of puroks and some have sitios.

- Alilem Daya (Poblacion)
- Amilongan
- Anaao
- Apang
- Apaya
- Batbato
- Daddaay
- Dalawa
- Kiat

=== Climate ===
Climate data for Alilem, Ilocos Sur
Month	Jan	Feb	Mar	Apr	May	Jun	Jul	Aug	Sep	Oct	Nov	Dec	Year
Mean daily maximum °C (°F)	30 (86)	31 (88)	32 (90)	33 (91)	32 (90)	31 (88)	30 (86)	30 (86)	30 (86)	31 (88)	31 (88)	30 (86)	31 (88)
Mean daily minimum °C (°F)	20 (68)	21 (70)	22 (72)	24 (75)	25 (77)	25 (77)	25 (77)	25 (77)	25 (77)	23 (73)	22 (72)	21 (70)	23 (74)
Average precipitation mm (inches)	27 (1.1)	31 (1.2)	40 (1.6)	71 (2.8)	207 (8.1)	237 (9.3)	286 (11.3)	261 (10.3)	261 (10.3)	254 (10.0)	88 (3.5)	46 (1.8)	1,809 (71.3)
Average rainy days	9.4	9.3	12.7	17.0	25.4	26.8	27.4	26.1	25.0	21.0	15.5	10.6	226.2
Source: Meteoblue (modeled/calculated data, not measured locally)

== Demographics ==
Population census of Alilem

Year	Pop.	±% p.a.
1903	175	—
1918	1,621	+16.00%
1939	3,285	+3.42%
1948	3,049	−0.82%
1960	3,594	+1.38%
1970	4,145	+1.43%

Year	Pop.	±% p.a.
1975	4,409	+1.25%
1980	4,599	+0.85%
1990	5,314	+1.46%
1995	5,533	+0.76%
2000	6,353	+3.01%
2007	6,217	−0.30%

Year	Pop.	±% p.a.
2010	6,640	+2.42%
2015	6,695	+0.16%
2020	7,361	+2.02%
2024	7,736	+1.20%

Source: Philippine Statistics Authority

In the 2024 census, Alilem had a population of 7,736 people. The population density was 65 inhabitants per square kilometre (170/sq mi).

== Economy ==
Poverty incidence of Alilem (%)

Source: Philippine Statistics Authority

Alilem's economy comes from agriculture. Farmers grow rice, sweet potatoes, taro, and vegetables.

== Government ==
=== Local government ===
Alilem, belonging to the second congressional district of the province of Ilocos Sur, is governed by a mayor designated as its local chief executive and by a municipal council as its legislative body in accordance with the Local Government Code. The mayor, vice mayor, and the councilors are elected directly by the people through an election which is being held every three years.

=== Elected officials ===
Members of the Municipal Council (2025–2028)
Position	Name
Congressman	Kristine Singson-Meehan
Mayor	Mar Ruel P. Sumabat
Vice-Mayor	Velmor P. Sumabat
Councilors	Arvin S. Bangaoil
Councilors	Kathrine P. Bangcod
Councilors	Justiniano D. Lacasandile Jr.
Councilors	Efren G. Colyong
Councilors	Antonio S. Budao
Councilors	Eduardo G. Mutong
Councilors	Orlando S. Sanggawa
Councilors	Johnny P. Tiglao

== Education ==
The Alilem-Sugpon Schools District governs all public and private education system within the municipality of Alilem, including the town of Sugpon. These include elementary and high schools.

=== Primary and elementary schools ===
- Aguiwas Elementary School
- Alilem Central School
- Amilongan Elementary School
- Anaao Elementary School
- Apang Elementary School
- Apaya Elementary School
- Batbato Elementary School
- Daddaay Elementary School
- Dalawa Elementary School
- Kiat Elementary School
- Guilong Primary School
- Naonao Elementary School
- Palasipas Elementary School
- Dagdag Elementary School

=== Secondary school ===
- Alilem National High School (Alilem Daya High School)
