= San Emilio =

Municipality in Ilocos Sur, Philippines

- Municipality
- Municipality of San Emilio
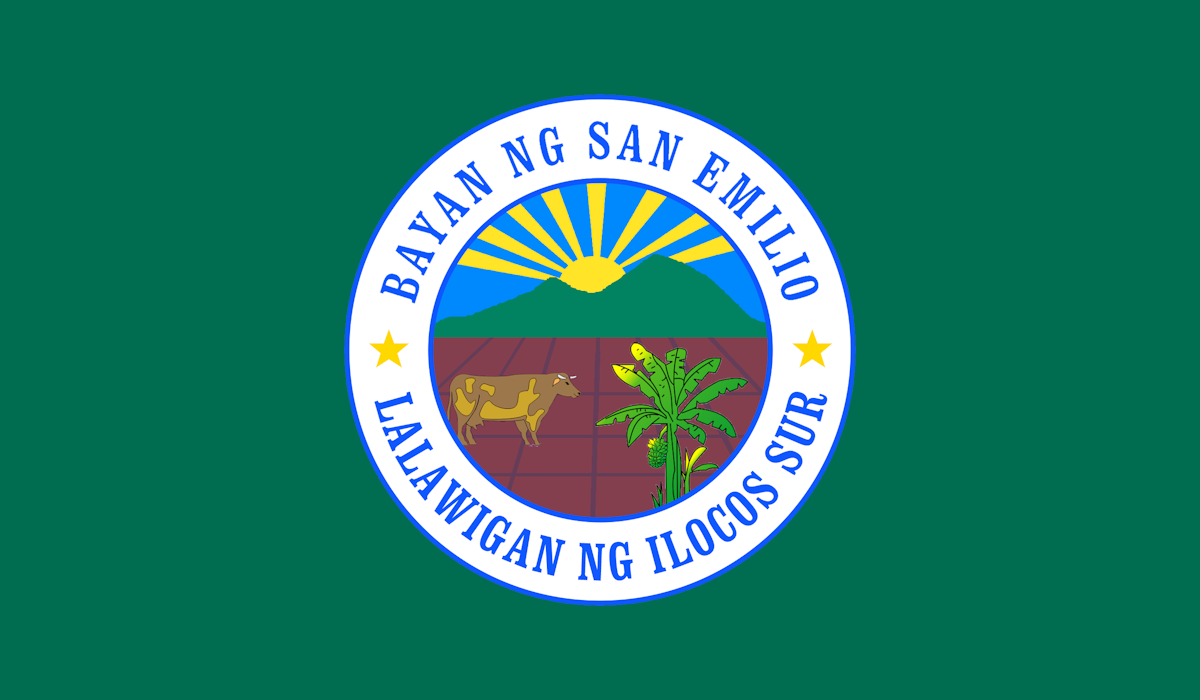
- Flag Seal

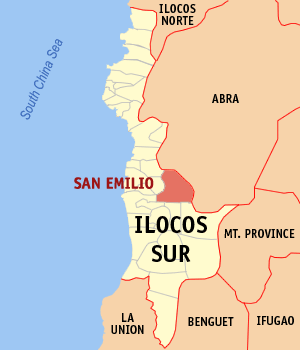
- Map of Ilocos Sur with San Emilio highlighted
- Interactive map of San Emilio
- Location within the Philippines
- Coordinates: 17°14′22″N 120°34′43″E
- Country: Philippines
- Region: Ilocos Region
- Province: Ilocos Sur
- District: 2nd district
- Barangays: 8 (see Barangays)

Government
  - Type: Sangguniang Bayan
  - Mayor: Joey Warren A. Bragado
  - Vice Mayor: Honesto S. Foronda
  - Representative: Kristine Singson-Meehan
  - Municipal Council: Members: Ferdinand Bongbong V. Banua Jr.; Quitos G. Batao-ey; Delfin M. Doria, Jr.; Nick G. Jueves; Willy C. Sangaan; Nolly B. Salleng; Manasseh B. Lais; Noel C. Umangil
  - Electorate: 5,545 voters (2025)

Area
  - Total: 141.44 km^{2} (54.61 sq mi)
- Elevation: 327 m (1,073 ft)
- Highest elevation: 723 m (2,372 ft)
- Lowest elevation: 73 m (240 ft)

Population (2024 census)
  - Total: 7,513
  - Density: 53.12/km^{2} (137.6/sq mi)
  - Households: 1,672

Economy
  - Income class: 1st municipal income class
  - Poverty incidence: 10.16% (2023)
  - Revenue: ₱ 544.8 million (2024)
  - Assets: ₱ 2,671 million (2024)
  - Expenditure: ₱ 204.6 million (2024)
  - Liabilities: ₱ 98.06 million (2024)

Service provider
  - Electricity: Ilocos Sur Electric Cooperative (ISECO)
- Time zone: UTC+8 (PST)
- ZIP code: 2722
- PSGC: 0102917000
- IDD : area code: +63 (0)77
- Native languages: Ilocano; Tagalog

San Emilio, officially the Municipality of San Emilio (Ilocano: Ili ti San Emilio; Filipino: Bayan ng San Emilio), is a municipality in the province of Ilocos Sur, Philippines. According to the 2024 census, it has a population of 7,513 people.

== Geography ==
San Emilio is situated 72.32 kilometres (44.94 mi) from the provincial capital Vigan, and 366.52 kilometres (227.74 mi) from the country's capital city of Manila.

=== Barangays ===
San Emilio is politically subdivided into 8 barangays. Each barangay consists of puroks and some have sitios.

- Cabaroan (Poblacion)
- Kalumsing
- Lancuas
- Matibuey
- Paltoc
- San Miliano
- Sibsibbu
- Tiagan

=== Climate ===
Climate data for San Emilio, Ilocos Sur
Month	Jan	Feb	Mar	Apr	May	Jun	Jul	Aug	Sep	Oct	Nov	Dec	Year
Mean daily maximum °C (°F)	27 (81)	28 (82)	30 (86)	31 (88)	29 (84)	28 (82)	27 (81)	27 (81)	27 (81)	28 (82)	28 (82)	27 (81)	28 (83)
Mean daily minimum °C (°F)	16 (61)	17 (63)	18 (64)	20 (68)	22 (72)	22 (72)	22 (72)	21 (70)	21 (70)	19 (66)	18 (64)	16 (61)	19 (67)
Average precipitation mm (inches)	10 (0.4)	10 (0.4)	14 (0.6)	23 (0.9)	80 (3.1)	103 (4.1)	121 (4.8)	111 (4.4)	119 (4.7)	144 (5.7)	39 (1.5)	15 (0.6)	789 (31.2)
Average rainy days	5.2	3.9	6.2	9.1	18.5	21.4	22.9	19.8	19.8	16.2	10.5	6.1	159.6
Source: Meteoblue (modeled/calculated data, not measured locally)

== Demographics ==
Population census of San Emilio
Year	Pop.	±% p.a.
1903	127	—
1918	1,709	+18.92%
1939	3,098	+2.87%
1948	3,245	+0.52%
1960	3,582	+0.83%
1970	4,464	+2.22%
1975	4,253	−0.97%
1980	4,398	+0.67%
1990	5,649	+2.54%
1995	6,173	+1.68%
2000	6,717	+1.83%
2007	6,920	+0.41%
2010	7,427	+2.61%
2015	7,407	−0.05%
2020	7,206	−0.58%
2024	7,513	+1.01%
Source: Philippine Statistics Authority

In the 2024 census, San Emilio had a population of 7,513 people. The population density was 53 inhabitants per square kilometre (140/sq mi).

== Economy ==
Poverty incidence of San Emilio (%)

Source: Philippine Statistics Authority

== Government ==
=== Local government ===
San Emilio is part of the second congressional district of the province of Ilocos Sur. It is governed by a mayor, designated as its local chief executive, and by a municipal council as its legislative body in accordance with the Local Government Code. The mayor, vice mayor, and the councilors are elected directly by the people through an election which is being held every three years.

=== Elected officials ===
Members of the Municipal Council (2019–2022)
Position	Name
Congressman	Kristine Singson-Meehan
Mayor	Joey Warren A. Bragado
Vice-Mayor	Honesto S. Foronda
Councilors	Ferdinand Bongbong V. Banua Jr.
Councilors	Quitos G. Batao-ey
Councilors	Delfin M. Doria, Jr.
Councilors	Nick G. Jueves
Councilors	Nolly B. Salleng
Councilors	Manasseh B. Lais
Councilors	Noel C. Umangil
Councilors	Villa G. Sangaan

== Education ==
The Banayoyo-Lidlidda-San Emilio Schools District Office governs all public and private education systems. Its jurisdiction includes the Municipality of San Emilio, including the towns of Banayoyo, and Lidlidda.

=== Primary and elementary schools ===
- Cangao Primary School
- Lancuas Elementary School
- Lidaoan Elementary School
- Masiosioay Elementary School
- Matibuey Elementary School
- Paltoc Elementary School
- Mangmangga Elementary School
- San Emilio East Central School
- San Emilio West Central School
- Sibsibbu Elementary School

=== Secondary schools ===
- Kalumsing Integrated School
- San Emilio National High School
- San Emilio Academy
