= Quirino, Ilocos Sur =

Municipality in Ilocos Sur, Philippines

Quirino
- Municipality
- Municipality of Quirino
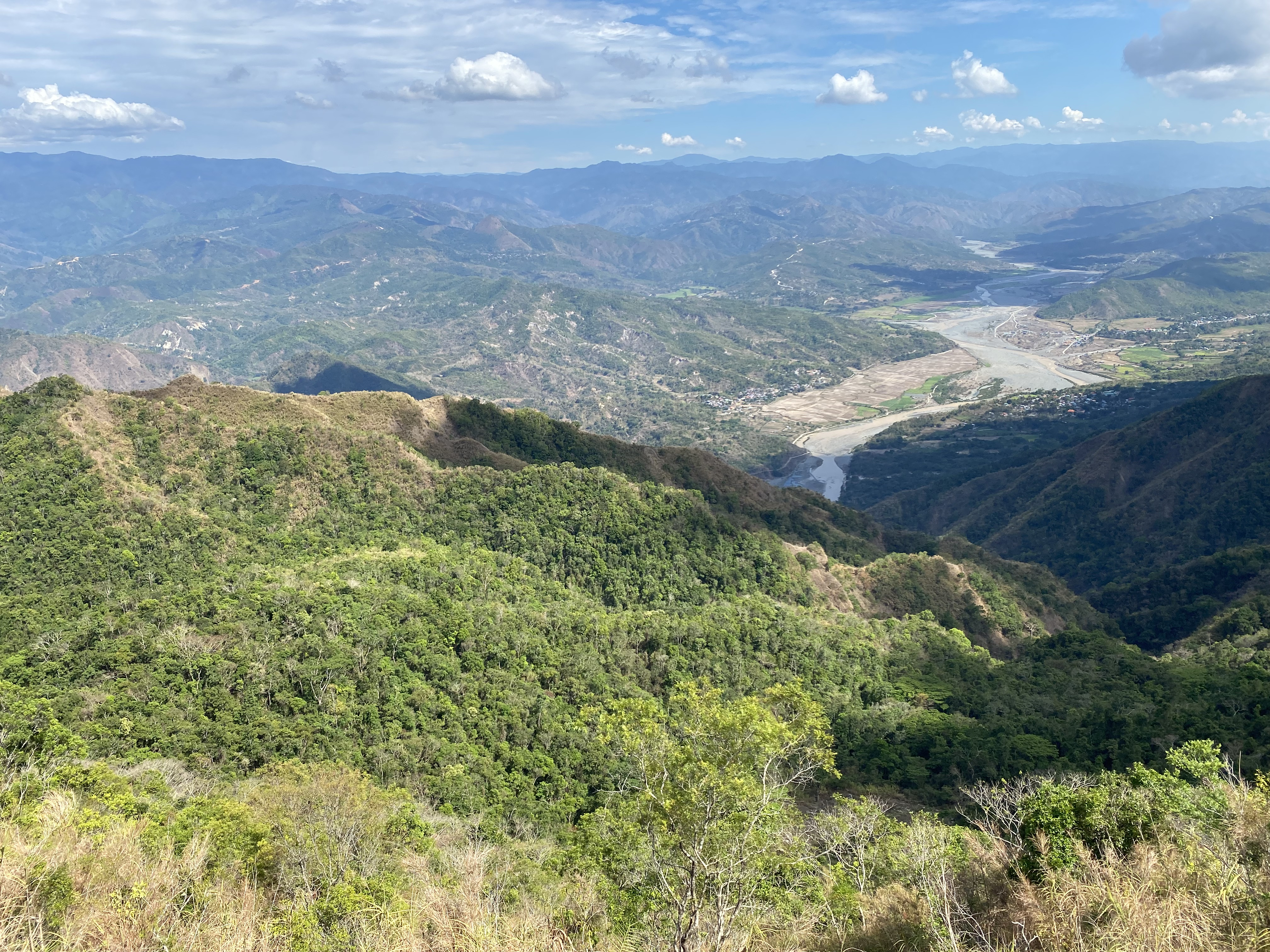
- View from the Skyline View Deck

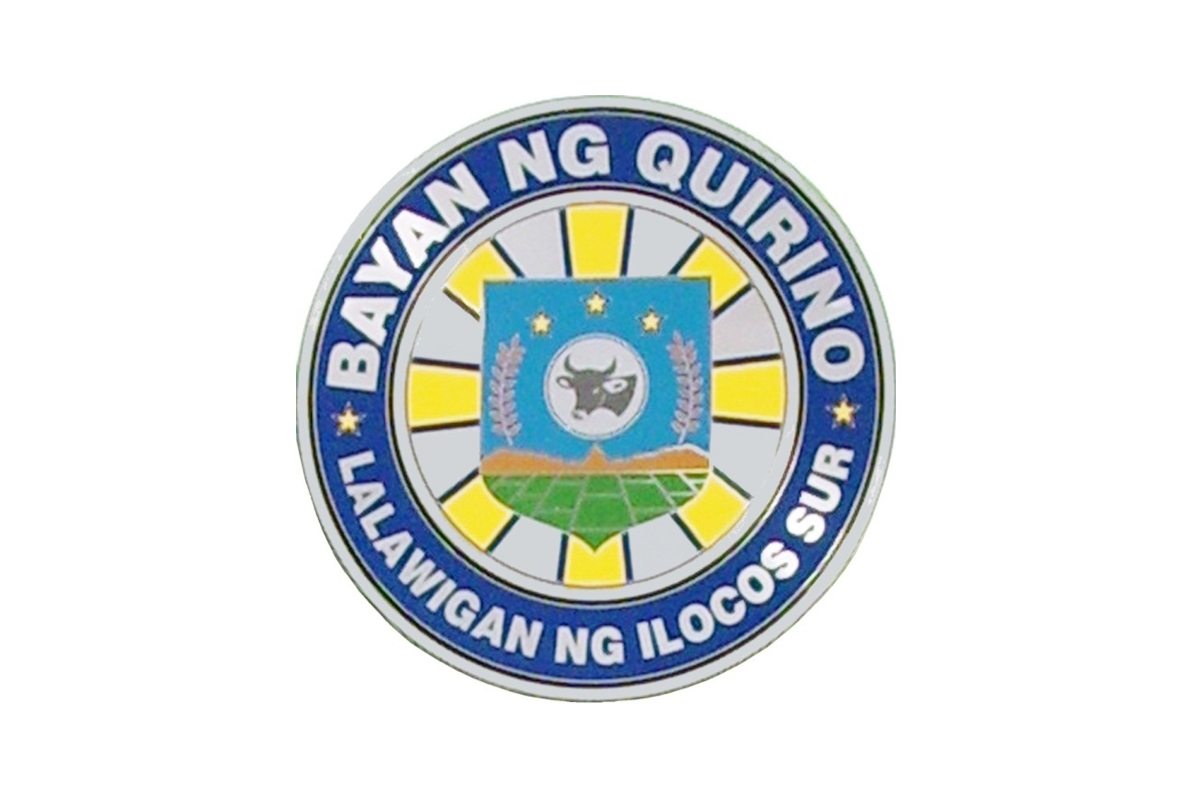
- Flag Seal
- Motto: Gawis ay Quirino!
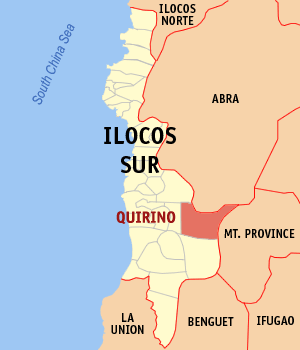
- Map of Ilocos Sur with Quirino highlighted
- Interactive map of Quirino
- Location within the Philippines
- Coordinates: 17°08′18″N 120°40′35″E
- Country: Philippines
- Region: Ilocos Region
- Province: Ilocos Sur
- District: 2nd district
- Named for: Elpidio Quirino
- Barangays: 9 (see Barangays)

Government
  - Type: Sangguniang Bayan
  - Mayor: Allen L. Nimo Jr.
  - Vice Mayor: Rodolfo A. Aciong
  - Representative: Kristine Singson-Meehan
  - Municipal Council: Members: Alvin J. Ewagen; Robert P. El-i; Elmer G. Panduyos; Gloria O. Balangyao; Clifford L. Patil-ao; Rene A. Wacquisan; Amor P. Bulao; Robert T. Sales
  - Electorate: 7,101 voters (2025)

Area
  - Total: 240.10 km^{2} (92.70 sq mi)
- Elevation: 555 m (1,821 ft)
- Highest elevation: 1,438 m (4,718 ft)
- Lowest elevation: 263 m (863 ft)

Population (2024 census)
  - Total: 9,460
  - Density: 39.4/km^{2} (102/sq mi)
  - Households: 2,105

Economy
  - Income class: 1st municipal income class
  - Poverty incidence: 10.58% (2023)
  - Revenue: ₱ 335.2 million (2024)
  - Assets: ₱ 176.1 million (2024)
  - Expenditure: ₱ 200.3 million (2024)
  - Liabilities: ₱ 97.16 million (2024)

Service provider
  - Electricity: Ilocos Sur Electric Cooperative (ISECO)
- Time zone: UTC+8 (PST)
- ZIP code: 2721
- PSGC: 0102915000
- IDD : area code: +63 (0)77
- Native languages: Ilocano; Tagalog

Quirino, officially the Municipality of Quirino (Ilocano: Ili ti Quirino; Filipino: Bayan ng Quirino), is a municipality in the province of Ilocos Sur, Philippines. According to the 2024 census, it has a population of 9,460 people.

== History ==
Formerly known as Angaki (also spelled Angkaki in some sources), the municipality was renamed in June 1964 in honor of Elpidio Quirino, an Ilocos Sur native who served as the sixth President of the Philippines.

== Geography ==
Quirino is situated 100.16 kilometres (62.24 mi) from the provincial capital Vigan, and 394.36 kilometres (245.04 mi) from the country's capital city of Manila.

=== Barangays ===
Quirino is politically subdivided into 9 barangays. Each barangay consists of puroks and some have sitios.

- Banoen
- Cayus
- Lamag (formerly Tubtuba)
- Legleg (Poblacion)
- Malideg
- Namitpit
- Patiacan
- Patungcaleo (formerly Lamag)
- Suagayan

=== Climate ===
Climate data for Quirino, Ilocos Sur
Month	Jan	Feb	Mar	Apr	May	Jun	Jul	Aug	Sep	Oct	Nov	Dec	Year
Mean daily maximum °C (°F)	28 (82)	29 (84)	31 (88)	32 (90)	30 (86)	29 (84)	28 (82)	28 (82)	28 (82)	29 (84)	29 (84)	29 (84)	29 (84)
Mean daily minimum °C (°F)	18 (64)	19 (66)	21 (70)	23 (73)	24 (75)	24 (75)	23 (73)	23 (73)	23 (73)	21 (70)	20 (68)	19 (66)	22 (71)
Average precipitation mm (inches)	27 (1.1)	31 (1.2)	40 (1.6)	71 (2.8)	207 (8.1)	237 (9.3)	286 (11.3)	261 (10.3)	261 (10.3)	254 (10.0)	88 (3.5)	46 (1.8)	1,809 (71.3)
Average rainy days	9.4	9.3	12.7	17.0	25.4	26.8	27.4	26.1	25.0	21.0	15.5	10.6	226.2
Source: Meteoblue (modeled/calculated data, not measured locally)

== Demographics ==
Population census of Quirino

Year	Pop.	±% p.a.
1903	291	—
1918	2,817	+16.34%
1939	3,182	+0.58%
1948	3,130	−0.18%
1960	4,318	+2.72%
1970	5,539	+2.52%

Year	Pop.	±% p.a.
1975	5,646	+0.38%
1980	5,283	−1.32%
1990	6,623	+2.29%
1995	7,295	+1.83%
2000	7,130	−0.49%
2007	7,866	+1.36%

Year	Pop.	±% p.a.
2010	8,535	+3.02%
2015	8,573	+0.08%
2020	9,306	+1.74%
2024	9,460	+0.39%

Source: Philippine Statistics Authority

In the 2024 census, Quirino had a population of 9,460. The population density was 39 inhabitants per square kilometre (100/sq mi).

== Economy ==
Poverty incidence of Quirino (%)

Source: Philippine Statistics Authority

The economy of Quirino in Ilocos Sur heavily relies on agriculture. Residents produce local crops and vegetables as the primary sources of agriculture. The municipality is home to the Skyline View Deck.

== Government ==
=== Local government ===
Quirino, belonging to the second congressional district of the province of Ilocos Sur, is governed by a mayor designated as its local chief executive and by a municipal council as its legislative body in accordance with the Local Government Code. The mayor, vice mayor, and the councilors are elected directly by the people through an election which is being held every three years.

=== Elected officials ===
Members of the Municipal Council (2025–2028)
Position	Name
Congressman	Kristine Singson-Meehan
Mayor	Jemarose G. Gomintong
Vice-Mayor	Rodolfo A. Aciong
Councilors	Calvin G. Ewagen
Councilors	Gloria O. Balangyao
Councilors	Elmer G. Panduyos
Councilors	Evelyn L. El-i
Councilors	Felix D. Dengaey
Councilors	Vincent L. Farol
Councilors	Gringgo N. Diamsay
Councilors	John Warren J. Wacquisan

== Education ==
The Cervantes-Quirino Schools District Office governs all private and public educational institutions within the municipality of Quirino. Also includes the private and public schools situated in Cervantes, Ilocos Sur.

=== Primary and elementary schools ===
- Bab-asig Primary School
- Banoen Primary School
- Baybayatin Primary School
- Bucnit Elementary School
- Cayus Elementary School
- Dagman Primary School
- Iteb Primary School
- Lamag Elementary School
- Malideg Elementary School
- Namitpit Integrated School (Elementary)
- Patiacan ES
- Patungcaleo Integrated School (Elementary)
- Quirino Central School
- Saoil Primary School
- Suagayan Elementary School
- Tirad View Academy (Elementary)

=== Secondary schools ===
- Namitpit Integrated School
- Patungcaleo Integrated School
- Quirino National High School
- Tirad View Academy

== See also ==
- List of renamed cities and municipalities in the Philippines
