= Sugpon =

Municipality in Ilocos Sur, Philippines

- Municipality
- Municipality of Sugpon
- Seal

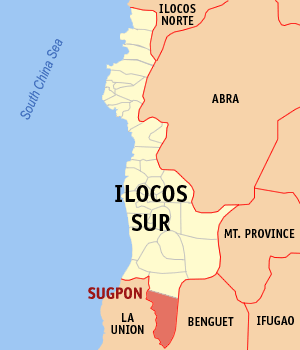
- Map of Ilocos Sur with Sugpon highlighted
- Interactive map of Sugpon
- Location within the Philippines
- Coordinates: 16°50′41″N 120°30′55″E
- Country: Philippines
- Region: Ilocos Region
- Province: Ilocos Sur
- District: 2nd district
- Barangays: 6 (see Barangays)

Government
  - Type: Sangguniang Bayan
  - Mayor: Daniel C. Laño
  - Vice Mayor: Rene Crisanto L. Lubrin
  - Representative: Kristine Singson-Meehan
  - Municipal Council: Members: Terence B. Yagyagen; Jose L. Abaag; Noli B. Pang-es; Nestor T. Sagayo; Roman A. Kitayan; Alma A. Yubos; Virgilio P. Quinio; Zorobhabell C. Apolog
  - Electorate: 2,772 voters (2025)

Area
  - Total: 57.11 km^{2} (22.05 sq mi)
- Elevation: 228 m (748 ft)
- Highest elevation: 813 m (2,667 ft)
- Lowest elevation: 44 m (144 ft)

Population (2024 census)
  - Total: 4,238
  - Density: 74.21/km^{2} (192.2/sq mi)
  - Households: 949

Economy
  - Income class: 3rd municipal income class
  - Poverty incidence: 19.39% (2023)
  - Revenue: ₱ 223.7 million (2024)
  - Assets: ₱ 916.8 million (2024)
  - Expenditure: ₱ 88.76 million (2024)
  - Liabilities: ₱ 166.6 million (2024)

Service provider
  - Electricity: Ilocos Sur Electric Cooperative (ISECO)
- Time zone: UTC+8 (PST)
- ZIP code: 2717
- PSGC: 0102931000
- IDD : area code: +63 (0)77
- Native languages: Ilocano; Tagalog
- Website: www.sugpon.gov.ph

Sugpon, officially the Municipality of Sugpon (Ilocano: Ili ti Sugpon; Filipino: Bayan ng Sugpon), is a municipality in the province of Ilocos Sur, Philippines. According to the 2024 census, it has a population of 4,238 people.

== Geography ==
Sugpon is situated 109.49 kilometres (68.03 mi) from the provincial capital Vigan, and 313.39 kilometres (194.73 mi) from the country's capital city of Manila.

=== Barangays ===
Sugpon is politically subdivided into 6 barangays. Each barangay consists of puroks and some have sitios.

- Balbalayang (Poblacion)
- Banga
- Caoayan
- Danac
- Licungan
- Pangotan

=== Climate ===
Climate data for Sugpon, Ilocos Sur
Month	Jan	Feb	Mar	Apr	May	Jun	Jul	Aug	Sep	Oct	Nov	Dec	Year
Mean daily maximum °C (°F)	30 (86)	31 (88)	32 (90)	33 (91)	32 (90)	31 (88)	30 (86)	30 (86)	30 (86)	31 (88)	31 (88)	30 (86)	31 (88)
Mean daily minimum °C (°F)	20 (68)	21 (70)	22 (72)	24 (75)	25 (77)	25 (77)	25 (77)	25 (77)	24 (75)	23 (73)	22 (72)	21 (70)	23 (74)
Average precipitation mm (inches)	27 (1.1)	31 (1.2)	40 (1.6)	71 (2.8)	207 (8.1)	237 (9.3)	286 (11.3)	261 (10.3)	261 (10.3)	254 (10.0)	88 (3.5)	46 (1.8)	1,809 (71.3)
Average rainy days	9.4	9.3	12.7	17.0	25.4	26.8	27.4	26.1	25.0	21.0	15.5	10.6	226.2
Source: Meteoblue (modeled/calculated data, not measured locally)

== Demographics ==
Population census of Sugpon

Year	Pop.	±% p.a.
1903	4	—
1918	2,407	+53.21%
1939	2,868	+0.84%
1948	2,159	−3.11%
1960	1,968	−0.77%
1970	2,432	+2.14%

Year	Pop.	±% p.a.
1975	2,380	−0.43%
1980	3,018	+4.86%
1990	2,844	−0.59%
1995	3,381	+3.29%
2000	3,513	+0.82%
2007	3,936	+1.58%

Year	Pop.	±% p.a.
2010	3,820	−1.08%
2015	4,585	+3.54%
2020	4,930	+1.54%
2024	4,238	−3.57%

Source: Philippine Statistics Authority

In the 2024 census, Sugpon had a population of 4,238 people. The population density was 74 inhabitants per square kilometre (190/sq mi).

== Economy ==
Poverty incidence of Sugpon (%)

Source: Philippine Statistics Authority

== Government ==
=== Local government ===
Sugpon is part of the second congressional district of the province of Ilocos Sur. It is governed by a mayor, designated as its local chief executive, and by a municipal council as its legislative body in accordance with the Local Government Code. The mayor, vice mayor, and the councilors are elected directly by the people through an election which is being held every three years.

=== Elected officials ===
Members of the Municipal Council (2019–2022)
Position	Name
Congressman	Kristine Singson-Meehan
Mayor	Daniel C. Laño
Vice-Mayor	Rene Crisanto L. Lubrin
Councilors	Terence B. Yagyagen
Councilors	Jose L. Abaag
Councilors	Noli B. Pang-es
Councilors	Nestor T. Sagayo
Councilors	Roman A. Kitayan
Councilors	Alma A. Yubos
Councilors	Virgilio P. Quinio
Councilors	Zorobhabell C. Apolog

== Education ==
The Alilem-Sugpon Schools District governs all public and private education system within the municipality of Sugpon, including the town of Alilem. These include elementary and high schools.

=== Primary and elementary schools ===
- Banga Elementary School
- Calipayan Elementary School
- Caoayan Elementary School
- Danac Elementary School
- Licungan Elementary School
- Nagawa Elem. School
- Sugpon Central School
- Tangilig Elementary School

=== Secondary school ===
- Sugpon National High School
