= Suyo, Ilocos Sur =

Municipality in Ilocos Sur, Philippines

Suyo
- Municipality
- Municipality of Suyo
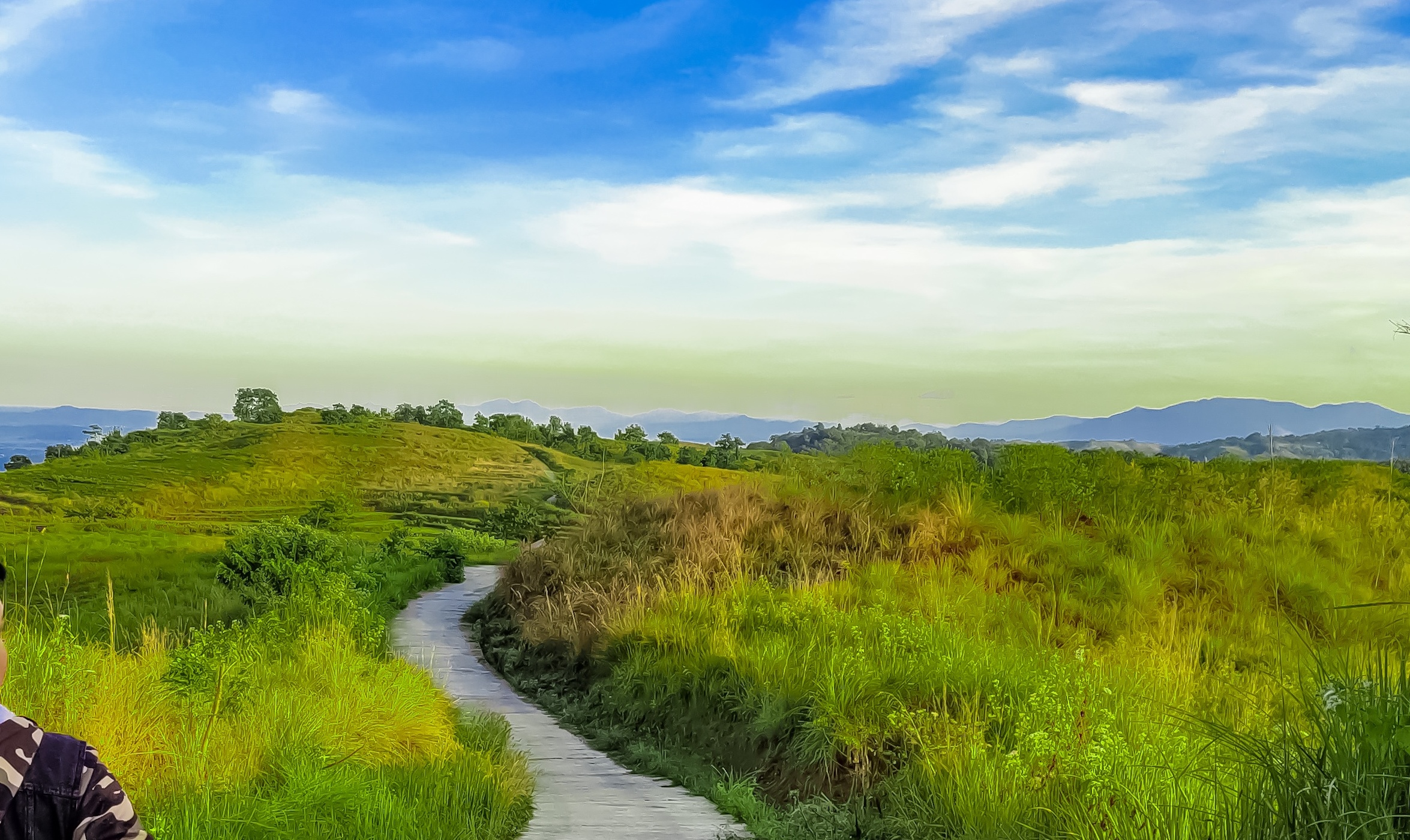
- Rural view of Suyo

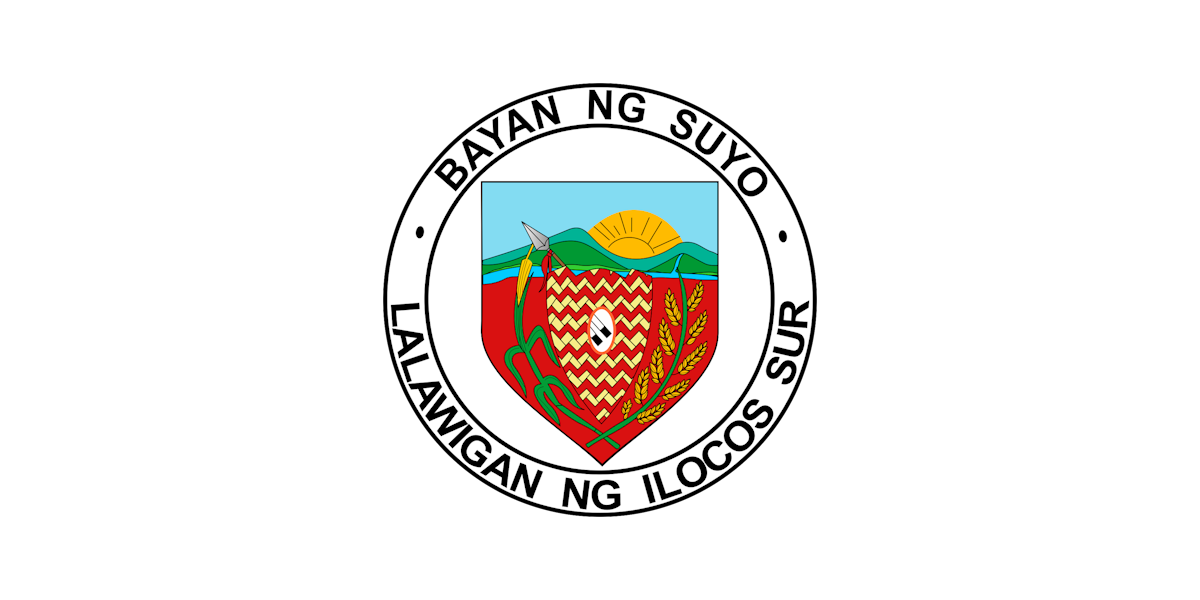
- Flag Seal

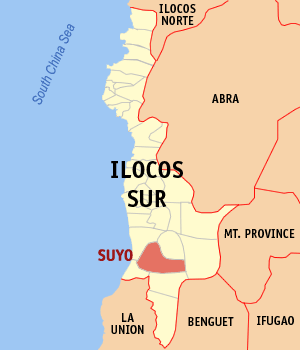
- Map of Ilocos Sur with Suyo highlighted
- Interactive map of Suyo
- Location within the Philippines
- Coordinates: 16°59′02″N 120°30′50″E
- Country: Philippines
- Region: Ilocos Region
- Province: Ilocos Sur
- District: 2nd district
- Barangays: 8 (see Barangays)

Government
  - Type: Sangguniang Bayan
  - Mayor: Mario B. Subagan
  - Vice Mayor: Samuel B. Subagan Jr.
  - Representative: Kristine Singson-Meehan
  - Municipal Council: Members: Renato B. Ngangac; Thomas B. Almazan; Reginald M. Orpilla; Roderick B. Galuga; Ramonito B. Lazaga; Pablito M. Avisa; Timoteo P. Abalos; Maria Corazon D. Cupido
  - Electorate: 7,639 voters (2025)

Area
  - Total: 124.00 km^{2} (47.88 sq mi)
- Elevation: 263 m (863 ft)
- Highest elevation: 987 m (3,238 ft)
- Lowest elevation: 32 m (105 ft)

Population (2024 census)
  - Total: 11,051
  - Density: 89.121/km^{2} (230.82/sq mi)
  - Households: 2,742

Economy
  - Income class: 1st municipal income class
  - Poverty incidence: 8.82% (2023)
  - Revenue: ₱ 295.4 million (2024)
  - Assets: ₱ 751.8 million (2024)
  - Expenditure: ₱ 162.7 million (2024)
  - Liabilities: ₱ 50.41 million (2024)

Service provider
  - Electricity: Ilocos Sur Electric Cooperative (ISECO)
- Time zone: UTC+8 (PST)
- ZIP code: 2715
- PSGC: 0102932000
- IDD : area code: +63 (0)77
- Native languages: Ilocano; Tagalog
- Website: www.suyo.gov.ph

Suyo, officially the Municipality of Suyo (Ilocano: Ili ti Suyo; Filipino: Bayan ng Suyo), is a municipality in the province of Ilocos Sur, Philippines. According to the 2024 census, it has a population of 11,051 people.

== Geography ==
Suyo is situated 98.20 kilometres (61.02 mi) from the provincial capital Vigan, and 328.17 kilometres (203.92 mi) from the country's capital city of Manila.

=== Barangays ===
Suyo is politically subdivided into 8 barangays. Each barangay consists of puroks and some have sitios.

- Baringcucurong
- Cabugao
- Man-atong
- Patoc-ao
- Poblacion (Kimpusa)
- Suyo Proper
- Urzadan
- Uso

=== Climate ===
Climate data for Suyo, Ilocos Sur
Month	Jan	Feb	Mar	Apr	May	Jun	Jul	Aug	Sep	Oct	Nov	Dec	Year
Mean daily maximum °C (°F)	30 (86)	31 (88)	32 (90)	33 (91)	32 (90)	31 (88)	30 (86)	30 (86)	30 (86)	31 (88)	31 (88)	30 (86)	31 (88)
Mean daily minimum °C (°F)	20 (68)	21 (70)	22 (72)	24 (75)	25 (77)	25 (77)	25 (77)	25 (77)	24 (75)	23 (73)	22 (72)	21 (70)	23 (74)
Average precipitation mm (inches)	27 (1.1)	31 (1.2)	40 (1.6)	71 (2.8)	207 (8.1)	237 (9.3)	286 (11.3)	261 (10.3)	261 (10.3)	254 (10.0)	88 (3.5)	46 (1.8)	1,809 (71.3)
Average rainy days	9.4	9.3	12.7	17.0	25.4	26.8	27.4	26.1	25.0	21.0	15.5	10.6	226.2
Source: Meteoblue (modeled/calculated data, not measured locally)

== Demographics ==
Population census of Suyo

Year	Pop.	±% p.a.
1903	17	—
1918	1,842	+36.66%
1939	3,750	+3.44%
1948	3,012	−2.41%
1960	4,704	+3.78%
1970	5,355	+1.30%

Year	Pop.	±% p.a.
1975	6,163	+2.86%
1980	6,454	+0.93%
1990	7,950	+2.11%
1995	8,870	+2.07%
2000	9,685	+1.90%
2007	11,826	+2.79%

Year	Pop.	±% p.a.
2010	10,622	−3.83%
2015	11,446	+1.43%
2020	10,766	−1.28%
2024	11,051	+0.63%

Source: Philippine Statistics Authority

In the 2024 census, Suyo had a population of 11,051 people. The population density was 89 inhabitants per square kilometre (230/sq mi).

== Economy ==
Poverty incidence of Suyo (%)

Source: Philippine Statistics Authority

== Government ==
=== Local government ===
Suyo is part of the second congressional district of the province of Ilocos Sur. It is governed by a mayor, designated as its local chief executive, and by a municipal council as its legislative body in accordance with the Local Government Code. The mayor, vice mayor, and the councilors are elected directly by the people through an election which is being held every three years.

=== Elected officials ===
Members of the Municipal Council (2019–2022)
Position	Name
Congressman	Kristine Singson-Meehan
Mayor	Mario B. Subagan
Vice-Mayor	Samuel B. Subagan Jr.
Councilors	Renato Ngangac
Councilors	Philip Bistoyong
Councilors	Reginald Orpilla
Councilors	Norberto Licnad
Councilors	Nestor Arcinas
Councilors	Alejandro Ballada
Councilors	Timoteo Abalos
Councilors	Orlando Aglibot

== Education ==
The Suyo Schools District Office governs all private and public educational institutions within the municipality. It oversees the operations of the education system.

=== Primary and elementary schools ===
- Balangsay Elementary School
- Bangcag Elementary School
- Baringcucurong Elementary School
- Batiangan Elementary School
- Bito Elementary School
- Cabugao Elementary School
- Dadtuco Elementary School
- Ida Elementary School
- Kiblongan Primary School
- Kinpatubbog Elementary School
- Kinapian Elementary School
- Longboy Elementary School
- Lubnac Elementary School
- Man-atong Elementary School
- Patoc-ao Elementary School
- Suyo Central School
- Suyo Proper Elementary School
- Urzadan Elementary School
- Uso Elementary School

=== Secondary schools ===
- Baringcucurong National High School
- Butac Integrated School
- Suyo National High School
