= List of barangays in Ilocos Sur =

The province of Ilocos Sur has 768 barangays comprising its 32 towns and 2 cities.

== Barangays ==
Most populous in its respective city/town (as of 2010)

Barangay	Population					City or Town
Barangay	2010	2007	2000	1995	1990	City or Town
Abaccan	233	273	255	276	237	Sigay
Abaya	313	298	287	234	242	Galimuyod
Abuor	1,049	990	874	816	824	Narvacan
Ag-agrao	1,007	1,063	912	874	878	Santa Maria
Ag-aguman	653	601	624	497	483	Tagudin
Aggay	743	764	718	654	716	Bantay
Aguing	308	323	329	304	317	Sinait
Al-aludig	828	762	729	673	667	Santiago
Alangan	632	639	518	432	348	Magsingal
Alfonso (Tangaoan)	964	882	828	757	695	Gregorio del Pilar
Alilem Daya (Poblacion)	1,418	1,516	1,422	1,177	1,251	Alilem
Alinaay	812	730	611	532	481	Cabugao
Alincaoeg	537	468	479	379	425	Santa Lucia
Allangigan Primero	1,114	1,177	1,132	995	895	Candon
Allangigan Segundo	1,054	1,026	921	840	782	Candon
Aluling	1,263	1,149	1,109	1,003	892	Cervantes
Amarao	515	506	476	420	423	Santa Cruz
Ambalayat	1,926	1,691	1,636	1,484	1,612	Tagudin
Ambucao	1,485	1,409	1,249	1,096	964	Santiago
Ambugat	379	380	364	301	324	Burgos
Ambulogan	1,352	1,322	1,302	1,287	1,285	Narvacan
Amguid	703	696	610	559	493	Candon
Amilongan	491	476	389	237	232	Alilem
Ampandula	669	561	541	536	531	Santa
Ampuagan	546	553	566	469	437	Santa Maria
An-annam	1,405	1,225	1,124	1,004	946	Bantay
Anaao	783	693	760	649	636	Alilem
Angkileng	777	743	692	668	687	Santa Lucia
Anonang Mayor	1,011	927	819	782	770	Caoayan
Anonang Menor	872	895	701	671	608	Caoayan
Ansad	640	631	654	604	669	San Esteban
Apang	484	400	458	392	309	Alilem
Apatot	1,644	1,504	1,278	1,165	1,054	San Esteban
Apaya	529	469	480	425	432	Alilem
Aquib	889	892	905	746	789	Narvacan
Aragan	787	724	725	682	684	Cabugao
Arangin	349	340	266	263	293	Santa Lucia
Arnap	1,116	1,034	873	808	750	Cabugao
Arnap	247	224	211	177	146	San Ildefonso
Asilang	257	226	232	251	225	San Juan (Lapog)
Atabay	312	319	328	363	321	Salcedo (Baugen)
Ayudante	1,060	1,062	994	868	844	Candon
Ayusan (Poblacion)	1,132	1,104	1,064	947	859	Santa Lucia
Ayusan Norte	2,966	2,446	1,997	1,366	1,195	Vigan
Ayusan Sur	930	925	810	764	629	Vigan
Baballasioan	760	615	699	630	720	Santa Maria
Babayoan	579	521	461	399	432	Santa Cruz
Bacar	545	462	504	489	449	Magsingal
Baclig (Poblacion)	2,268	2,268	1,982	1,775	1,647	Cabugao
Bacsayan	482	489	430	353	371	Santa Cruz
Bacsil	1,063	946	996	946	922	San Juan (Lapog)
Bagani Camposanto	1,962	1,915	1,658	1,566	1,356	Candon
Bagani Gabor	639	570	428	388	335	Candon
Bagani Tocgo	527	498	431	384	361	Candon
Bagani Ubbog	1,391	1,335	1,133	984	912	Candon
Bagar	1,311	1,302	1,200	1,066	1,077	Candon
Bagbagotot	414	377	329	276	266	Banayoyo
Baggoc	668	748	705	746	677	Caoayan
Bahet	843	766	548	534	463	San Ildefonso
Balaleng	2,724	2,617	2,389	2,099	2,199	Bantay
Balaweg	540	553	502	438	376	Nagbukel
Balbalayang (Poblacion)	1,311	1,178	1,245	1,053	889	Sugpon
Balidbid	1,161	1,149	1,096	1,071	945	Salcedo (Baugen)
Balingaoan	1,545	1,432	1,372	1,126	1,307	Candon
Baliw	758	562	664	546	547	San Juan (Lapog)
Baliw	193	193	175	152	148	Sinait
Baliw Daya	420	395	407	366	345	Santa Maria
Baliw Laud	703	553	535	495	481	Santa Maria
Ballaigui (Poblacion)	659	643	666	634	689	Sinait
Baluarte	632	671	630	586	548	Salcedo (Baugen)
Balugang	468	480	483	402	431	Burgos
Banaoang	393	419	352	359	313	Bantay
Banaoang	568	565	549	546	601	Santa
Banay	473	444	425	349	353	Santa Cruz
Banbanaal	667	575	497	490	462	Banayoyo
Banbanaba	527	472	474	399	440	Santa Lucia
Bandril	415	384	411	324	322	Nagbukel
Banga	752	1,149	665	543	476	Sugpon
Bangbangar	292	253	273	246	243	Burgos
Banglayan	1,091	1,037	958	837	784	Narvacan
Bani	604	496	500	455	433	Santa Lucia
Bannuar (Poblacion)	1,248	1,225	1,161	1,131	1,012	San Juan (Lapog)
Banoen	646	584	629	614	658	Quirino (Angkaki)
Bantaoay	1,566	1,790	1,598	1,473	1,477	San Vicente
Bantay Abot	790	743	667	622	–	Narvacan
Bantugo	651	650	648	568	526	Nagbukel
Banucal	693	684	693	574	563	Lidlidda
Bao-as	658	634	546	537	534	Santa Lucia
Baracbac	260	306	276	273	254	Galimuyod
Baracbac	775	637	712	660	718	Sinait
Baracbac	938	815	773	675	602	Tagudin
Barangay 1 (Poblacion)	622	684	645	510	532	Bantay
Barangay 2 (Poblacion)	727	793	771	770	854	Bantay
Barangay 3 (Poblacion)	1,008	960	851	743	514	Bantay
Barangay 4 (Poblacion)	925	1,020	963	985	904	Bantay
Barangay 5 (Poblacion)	732	813	826	751	679	Bantay
Barangay 6 (Poblacion)	477	519	544	503	502	Bantay
Barangay I (Poblacion)	570	742	891	1,136	1,279	Vigan
Barangay II - Amianance (Poblacion)	616	590	744	817	792	Vigan
Barangay III (Poblacion)	1,427	1,393	1,812	1,813	1,571	Vigan
Barangay IV - Solid West (Poblacion)	2,239	1,876	2,379	2,359	2,231	Vigan
Barangay IX - Cuta (Poblacion)	2,502	2,150	2,045	2,240	2,158	Vigan
Barangay V - Pagpartian (Poblacion)	787	681	820	1,029	852	Vigan
Barangay VI - Pagpandayan (Poblacion)	1,294	1,247	1,038	1,018	1,011	Vigan
Barangay VII - Pagburnayan (Poblacion)	1,409	1,674	2,890	1,960	1,361	Vigan
Barangay VIII - Cabasaan/Santa Elena (Poblacion)	1,557	1,427	1,434	1,496	1,323	Vigan
Barangobong (Poblacion)	1,054	876	933	925	851	Santa Lucia
Barbar	1,454	1,470	1,437	1,243	1,346	San Juan (Lapog)
Barbarit	844	707	690	636	586	Magsingal
Barikir	455	445	417	390	357	Sinait
Baringcucurong	1,511	1,585	1,396	1,212	1,086	Suyo
Bario-an	601	565	551	527	499	Tagudin
Baritao	606	511	478	372	372	Tagudin
Barraca	289	286	260	287	255	Vigan
Basug	274	226	264	271	277	Santa
Batbato	543	464	456	408	392	Alilem
Bateria	477	460	377	350	332	San Esteban
Bato	443	413	436	397	376	Cabugao
Battog	506	487	465	445	385	Sinait
Baybayabas	551	463	439	431	390	Santiago
Baybayading	230	228	264	248	259	Salcedo (Baugen)
Bayubay Norte	1,189	1,219	1,127	1,056	986	San Vicente
Bayubay Sur	1,473	1,394	1,200	1,041	891	San Vicente
Bayugao Este	341	256	321	261	247	Santa Cruz
Bayugao Oeste	576	593	491	408	445	Santa Cruz
Becques	1,855	1,876	1,862	1,620	1,626	Tagudin
Beddeng Daya	566	484	449	392	358	Vigan
Beddeng Laud	934	589	666	573	487	Vigan
Belen	133	123	117	112	64	San Ildefonso
Bequi-Walin	529	408	432	394	365	Lidlidda
Besalan	996	974	972	892	902	Santa Cruz
Bessang	392	361	412	357	365	Burgos
Bia-o	548	548	475	403	377	Santa Maria
Bidbiday	765	770	713	646	545	Galimuyod
Bigbiga	585	595	555	527	482	Santiago
Bimmanga	908	781	769	663	686	Tagudin
Binacud	298	285	273	284	270	Sinait
Binalayangan	285	277	273	261	239	Santo Domingo
Binongan	699	613	602	565	509	Santo Domingo
Bio	990	939	1,201	1,006	837	Tagudin
Bisangol	209	221	225	187	191	Banayoyo
Bitalag	1,124	1,070	1,089	1,010	1,049	Tagudin
Bitong	214	236	224	186	174	Galimuyod
Boguibog	771	825	768	776	722	Salcedo (Baugen)
Bongtolan	676	476	508	650	508	Vigan
Bonifacio (Poblacion)	1,383	1,299	1,339	1,296	1,329	Cabugao
Borobor	278	284	213	203	182	Galimuyod
Borobor	484	489	508	516	424	Santo Domingo
Borono	894	871	835	734	685	Tagudin
Bucalag	208	167	333	313	306	Santa
Bucao East	261	226	218	223	168	Tagudin
Bucao West	394	418	339	313	282	Tagudin
Bugbuga	642	688	583	547	449	Santa Cruz
Bugnay	856	770	803	785	754	Candon
Bugui	235	185	252	215	225	Lidlidda
Bulag	2,412	2,377	2,348	2,291	2,073	Bantay
Bulala	2,000	1,762	1,523	1,421	1,338	Vigan
Bulala-Leguey	286	231	293	288	249	Salcedo (Baugen)
Bulanos	940	951	867	766	717	Narvacan
Bulbulala	501	522	496	424	468	Santiago
Buliclic	395	419	399	411	363	Santa Lucia
Bungro	402	373	339	380	330	Cabugao
Bungro	1,367	1,275	1,053	845	840	Magsingal
Bungro	650	638	549	507	458	San Ildefonso
Buquig	842	856	667	648	433	Bantay
Burgos (Poblacion)	487	531	456	441	453	Santa Lucia
Busel-busel	458	450	380	345	320	Santiago
Busiing Norte	761	661	521	455	407	San Ildefonso
Busiing Sur	546	456	432	394	394	San Ildefonso
Bussot	406	431	385	390	295	Gregorio del Pilar
Butir	733	713	624	592	624	Santa Maria
Butol	1,000	949	928	908	854	Santiago
Cabalangegan	586	537	465	398	421	Vigan
Cabalanggan	691	633	479	444	397	Bantay
Cabangaran	291	286	327	299	294	Santa
Cabanglotan	917	921	760	742	661	San Juan (Lapog)
Cabangtalan	476	443	460	413	437	Sinait
Cabarambanan	402	410	417	354	324	Sinait
Cabaritan	460	452	445	416	426	Santa Lucia
Cabaritan	1,020	965	901	820	677	Santo Domingo
Cabaroan	716	701	589	572	539	Bantay
Cabaroan	566	519	512	491	517	Magsingal
Cabaroan	842	830	785	736	663	San Esteban
Cabaroan	1,260	1,163	1,197	1,092	1,046	Santa Catalina
Cabaroan	1,413	1,209	1,239	1,123	1,036	Santa Maria
Cabaroan	761	585	546	427	425	Tagudin
Cabaroan (Poblacion)	1,135	1,008	–	859	777	San Emilio
Cabaroan Daya	958	831	733	901	683	Vigan
Cabaroan Laud	475	480	442	452	380	Vigan
Cabcaburao	481	432	431	396	376	Burgos
Cabigbigaan	607	570	533	488	408	Santo Domingo
Cabittaogan	2,590	2,574	2,271	2,193	2,128	Santa Catalina
Cabugao	1,144	1,227	1,019	991	890	Suyo
Cabugbugan	878	829	916	763	742	Tagudin
Cabulalaan	359	316	347	357	351	Sinait
Cabulanglangan	509	448	464	423	432	Tagudin
Cabuloan	1,326	1,352	1,267	1,174	1,219	Santa Catalina
Caburao	1,332	1,202	1,071	995	1,015	Santiago
Cabusligan	715	681	640	566	542	Bantay
Cacadiran	841	725	687	620	585	Cabugao
Cacandongan	314	287	262	291	267	San Juan (Lapog)
Cadacad	356	332	318	282	257	Burgos
Cadacad	223	189	235	221	228	Nagbukel
Cadacad	717	650	670	657	608	Narvacan
Cadanglaan	235	223	198	177	186	Banayoyo
Cadanglaan	182	142	129	109	88	Magsingal
Cadanglaan	347	377	359	358	358	Sinait
Caellayan	1,057	1,037	1,037	1,041	965	Cabugao
Cagayungan	1,201	1,181	987	946	1,037	Narvacan
Calangcuasan	956	905	845	833	711	Salcedo (Baugen)
Calanutian	575	515	500	476	436	Sinait
Calaoaan	2,363	2,382	2,062	1,842	1,661	Candon
Calaoaan	1,443	1,379	1,290	1,222	1,144	Santa Cruz
Calautit	1,014	953	930	861	770	Santo Domingo
Calay-ab	823	720	690	598	546	Santo Domingo
Calimugtong	458	479	386	340	340	Galimuyod
Calingayan	262	258	244	233	211	Sinait
Callaguip	939	1,046	1,055	929	822	Caoayan
Callitong	547	540	515	485	487	Burgos
Calongbuyan	2,603	2,508	2,150	1,693	1,801	Candon
Calongbuyan	563	598	550	546	527	Galimuyod
Calumbaya	234	211	169	176	175	Galimuyod
Calungboyan	498	483	424	400	382	Santa
Calungbuyan	220	140	192	140	150	Lidlidda
Camangaan	862	719	783	768	579	Vigan
Camanggaan	566	528	511	477	416	San Juan (Lapog)
Camanggaan	1,116	1,140	1,069	940	882	Santa Cruz
Camarao	1,244	1,214	1,138	1,040	948	Narvacan
Camestizoan	989	956	763	713	638	Santo Domingo
Camindoroan	808	843	777	703	651	San Juan (Lapog)
Candalican	489	403	430	287	303	Santa Cruz
Caoayan	568	562	654	659	585	Sugpon
Capangdanan	851	835	714	579	533	Bantay
Capangpangan	1,637	1,490	1,416	1,236	1,182	Vigan
Caparacadan	351	370	316	277	271	Caoayan
Capariaan	1,525	1,416	1,388	1,330	1,331	Santa Cruz
Cappa-cappa	770	780	641	588	599	San Esteban
Caraisan	691	697	581	561	575	Magsingal
Carcarabasa	354	297	280	275	217	Lidlidda
Caronoan	679	604	585	509	491	San Juan (Lapog)
Carusipan	563	498	571	495	562	Cabugao
Casiber	629	548	529	455	471	Santa
Casilagan	299	272	255	238	203	Nagbukel
Casilagan	627	673	602	591	576	Narvacan
Casilagan	731	686	721	594	576	Santa Cruz
Casilagan Norte	568	503	471	409	436	Banayoyo
Casilagan Sur	447	423	371	314	338	Banayoyo
Casili	374	378	374	338	308	Santo Domingo
Casocos	202	183	157	148	138	Nagbukel
Catayagan	763	716	669	563	538	Santa Lucia
Caterman	2,423	2,311	2,031	1,905	1,752	Candon
Catucdaan	907	814	799	784	787	Cabugao
Cayus	739	706	546	555	469	Quirino (Angkaki)
Codoog	875	877	777	723	749	Narvacan
Comillas North	1,819	1,567	1,587	1,471	1,154	Cervantes
Comillas South	1,598	1,288	1,326	1,311	1,159	Cervantes
Concepcion	718	793	732	709	570	Gregorio del Pilar
Concepcion (Poblacion)	1,655	1,426	1,209	1,138	1,041	Cervantes
Conconig East	1,301	1,184	1,095	1,008	979	Santa Lucia
Conconig West	864	824	690	558	594	Santa Lucia
Coscosnong	482	436	406	332	359	Santa Cruz
Cuancabal	916	907	818	686	606	Cabugao
Cuantacla	729	672	656	588	517	Cabugao
Cubcubboot	472	499	413	370	323	Candon
Culiong	304	270	274	255	230	Salcedo (Baugen)
Curtin	346	352	325	334	326	Sinait
Daclapan	2,150	1,981	1,719	1,494	1,438	Cabugao
Dacutan	682	630	575	508	506	Magsingal
Dacutan	525	460	453	392	377	Tagudin
Dadalaquiten Norte	782	784	747	731	711	Sinait
Dadalaquiten Sur	717	721	789	787	781	Sinait
Daddaay	686	614	657	629	592	Alilem
Dalawa	1,248	1,172	1,284	1,159	1,077	Alilem
Daldagan	390	446	360	339	305	Galimuyod
Daligan	515	523	502	492	458	Santa Cruz
Damacuag	821	969	823	769	793	Santa Lucia
Dammay	199	165	219	205	340	Santa
Dan-ar	1,862	1,770	1,488	1,438	1,394	Santiago
Danac	440	383	368	368	335	Sugpon
Danuman East	409	401	388	370	306	Santa Maria
Danuman West	628	599	542	503	472	Santa Maria
Dapdappig	481	536	481	446	416	Gregorio del Pilar
Darao	333	350	394	370	324	San Juan (Lapog)
Darapidap	3,049	2,868	2,483	2,214	2,070	Candon
Dardarat	1,470	1,355	1,388	1,127	1,179	Cabugao
Dardarat	582	582	474	442	393	San Juan (Lapog)
Dardarat	1,625	1,560	1,412	1,335	1,310	Tagudin
Dasay	1,195	996	981	968	950	Narvacan
Dayanki	616	606	604	550	539	Burgos
Dean Leopoldo Yabes (Pug-os)	1,563	1,476	1,426	1,230	1,251	Sinait
Del Pilar (Poblacion)	1,287	1,344	1,380	1,413	1,275	Tagudin
Dili	1,621	1,632	1,488	1,218	1,198	Santa Cruz
Dinalaoan	1,077	998	888	818	766	Narvacan
Dinaratan	721	794	853	845	802	Salcedo (Baugen)
Dinwede East	637	569	573	473	453	Cervantes
Dinwede West	915	681	997	1,387	1,499	Cervantes
Dirdirig (Dirdirig-Paday)	879	839	787	793	715	Burgos
Don Alejandro Quirologico (Poblacion)	1,090	1,172	1,165	963	–	Caoayan
Don Dimas Querubin (Poblacion)	996	1,056	965	–	–	Caoayan
Don Lorenzo Querubin (Poblacion)	1,036	1,155	1,003	865	–	Caoayan
Dongalo	309	278	208	202	155	San Ildefonso
Dunglayan	759	777	745	724	695	Santa Maria
Duyayyat	451	439	397	362	360	Sinait
Elefante	597	552	472	442	376	Banayoyo
Estancia	229	240	218	191	167	Narvacan
Farola	1,169	1,181	1,000	888	877	Tagudin
Flora	594	635	496	474	472	Santo Domingo
Fuerte	2,578	2,525	2,367	2,107	1,921	Caoayan
Gabao	750	690	724	723	692	Santiago
Gabor Norte	1,092	827	745	605	586	Santa Cruz
Gabor Sur	657	574	573	525	466	Santa Cruz
Gabur	569	517	470	411	386	Tagudin
Garitan	960	929	968	983	917	Tagudin
Gongogong	313	306	198	198	167	San Ildefonso
Guardia	491	482	470	463	368	Banayoyo
Guimod	1,005	1,034	872	802	812	Bantay
Guimod Norte	405	431	429	305	364	San Juan (Lapog)
Guimod Sur	1,007	719	856	769	834	San Juan (Lapog)
Guinabang	267	231	233	210	195	Santiago
Gusing	1,047	1,113	902	818	814	Santa Maria
Iboy	420	438	342	328	304	San Ildefonso
Immayos Norte	744	598	643	544	487	San Juan (Lapog)
Immayos Sur	241	192	221	200	160	San Juan (Lapog)
Imus	290	287	303	281	328	Santiago
Jardin	374	351	368	366	364	Tagudin
Jordan	550	565	488	463	410	Sinait
Kaliwakiw	378	376	371	326	278	Salcedo (Baugen)
Kalumsing	731	664	–	609	576	San Emilio
Katipunan	1,012	962	891	824	700	Sinait
Kiat	458	413	447	457	393	Alilem
Kilang	254	242	217	211	177	Galimuyod
Kinamantirisan	264	209	233	197	168	San Ildefonso
Kinmarin	366	391	396	390	373	Salcedo (Baugen)
Labnig	1,056	1,070	1,034	973	880	San Juan (Lapog)
Labut	267	223	217	203	184	Lidlidda
Labut	719	629	553	545	552	Magsingal
Labut Norte	540	507	528	475	421	Santa
Labut Sur	270	259	287	264	309	Santa
Lacong	942	841	710	654	634	Tagudin
Lagatit	906	830	825	803	694	Santo Domingo
Lalong	305	392	338	313	303	Santa Cruz
Lamag (Tubtuba)	614	563	537	495	458	Quirino (Angkaki)
Lancuas	969	901	–	905	757	San Emilio
Lang-ayan	344	321	359	356	360	Santiago
Langaoan	650	548	511	505	533	Santa Maria
Langlangca Primero	649	581	557	551	505	Candon
Langlangca Segundo	1,164	1,223	1,168	1,018	1,062	Candon
Lanipao	669	536	558	531	536	Narvacan
Lantag	873	821	710	630	620	Santa Cruz
Lantag	362	341	317	293	241	Tagudin
Laoingen	1,338	1,063	1,049	973	927	Santo Domingo
Lapting	369	338	328	265	257	Nagbukel
Lapting	983	974	905	775	746	San Juan (Lapog)
Las-ud	564	519	528	516	462	Santa Cruz
Las-ud	1,042	884	840	772	718	Tagudin
Laslasong Norte	949	713	808	728	693	Santa Maria
Laslasong Sur	628	594	546	498	438	Santa Maria
Laslasong West	212	225	207	163	138	Santa Maria
Legaspi	296	337	290	276	271	Galimuyod
Legleg (Poblacion)	1,737	1,758	1,489	1,581	1,234	Quirino (Angkaki)
Lesseb	149	187	157	127	118	Burgos
Lesseb	183	193	162	160	141	Santa Maria
Libang	940	852	820	695	683	Cervantes
Libtong	2,147	2,055	1,848	1,629	1,462	Tagudin
Licungan (Cullang)	407	368	335	505	297	Sugpon
Lingsat	1,099	1,010	932	839	793	Bantay
Lingsat	1,736	1,931	1,755	1,742	1,626	Santa Maria
Lintic	1,248	1,163	1,029	984	880	Banayoyo
Lipit	858	817	692	659	777	Cabugao
Lira (Poblacion)	858	784	770	730	752	San Juan (Lapog)
Lopez	442	428	401	417	397	Banayoyo
Luba	830	824	766	680	708	Santa Lucia
Lubing	432	436	352	336	250	Burgos
Lubnac	935	786	761	803	741	Tagudin
Lubong	1,173	1,078	926	797	867	San Vicente
Lubong	351	329	313	293	302	Santa Lucia
Lubong	936	751	724	624	555	Santa Maria
Lucaban	488	524	477	429	389	Burgos
Lucbuban	533	489	473	425	365	Salcedo (Baugen)
Luna	1,096	1,069	1,012	948	934	Burgos
Lungog	1,948	2,066	1,940	1,802	1,712	Narvacan
Lussoc	1,164	1,083	1,049	1,038	931	Santo Domingo
Maas-asin	731	683	708	766	688	Magsingal
Mabayag	375	339	278	275	294	Galimuyod
Mabilbila Norte	717	708	673	567	485	Santa
Mabilbila Sur	1,880	1,642	1,555	1,325	1,204	Santa
Mabileg	296	288	262	235	184	Sigay
Macabiag (Poblacion)	863	863	823	801	733	Sinait
Macaoayan	465	494	548	493	539	Burgos
Macatcatud	840	788	842	751	828	Magsingal
Madarang	272	273	297	298	327	Salcedo (Baugen)
Magsaysay	611	586	517	497	409	Sinait
Magsaysay (Poblacion)	651	740	713	670	606	Tagudin
Magsaysay District (Poblacion)	911	899	769	708	534	Santa
Malacañang	366	366	414	383	345	Tagudin
Malamin	656	640	581	538	496	San Juan (Lapog)
Malaya	1,595	1,478	1,465	1,315	1,158	Cervantes
Malideg	809	726	696	676	580	Quirino (Angkaki)
Maligcong	279	267	259	264	247	Salcedo (Baugen)
Malingeb	1,396	1,286	1,247	1,117	969	Bantay
Mambog	1,031	1,000	998	816	719	Santa Cruz
Mambug	559	546	533	453	374	Burgos
Mambug	1,126	1,026	896	847	840	Santiago
Man-atong	1,682	2,036	1,722	1,547	1,388	Suyo
Manaboc	560	549	571	490	454	Burgos
Manangat	933	927	798	779	830	Caoayan
Mantanas	1,216	1,166	1,168	900	849	Santa Cruz
Manueva	1,006	1,003	885	853	803	Santa
Manzante	1,743	1,651	1,531	1,427	1,426	Magsingal
Mapanit	249	230	247	188	205	Burgos
Mapisi	353	341	298	298	289	Nagbukel
Maradodon	837	805	816	766	833	Cabugao
Maratudo	1,177	1,196	1,071	917	809	Magsingal
Marcos (Poblacion)	571	558	557	499	545	Santa
Margaay	837	828	683	639	654	Cabugao
Margaay	2,120	2,066	1,854	1,650	1,657	Narvacan
Marnay	296	331	363	335	284	Sinait
Marozo	1,299	1,221	1,192	1,132	1,066	Narvacan
Masadag	503	545	574	521	510	Sinait
Matallucod	229	243	260	253	248	Sigay
Matanubong	179	170	145	125	112	Galimuyod
Matibuey	1,055	973	–	876	835	San Emilio
Matue-Butarag	672	649	665	673	622	Gregorio del Pilar
Maynganay Norte	928	918	823	752	791	Santa Maria
Maynganay Sur	737	769	710	650	660	Santa Maria
Mckinley	539	561	481	451	442	Galimuyod
Mindoro	1,571	1,572	1,475	1,390	1,314	Vigan
Mira	459	373	311	310	281	Bantay
Miramar	1,372	1,217	1,224	1,036	1,057	Magsingal
Mission	329	315	305	265	240	Nagbukel
Montero	110	113	104	89	109	Banayoyo
Muraya	574	587	565	513	505	San Juan (Lapog)
Nagbalioartian	480	489	411	391	371	Sinait
Nagbettedan	717	657	620	587	492	Santo Domingo
Nagcullooban	430	440	451	428	474	Sinait
Naglaoa-an	879	829	785	697	592	Santo Domingo
Nagongburan	365	378	350	346	363	Sinait
Nagpanaoan	371	326	339	288	270	Burgos
Nagpanaoan	596	592	503	350	139	Santa
Nagrebcan	731	706	766	784	795	Santa Lucia
Nagsabaran	920	763	742	695	636	San Juan (Lapog)
Nagsangalan	1,661	1,698	1,400	1,283	1,194	Vigan
Nagsantaan	370	379	386	358	375	Cabugao
Nagsayaoan	651	650	574	480	482	Santa Maria
Nagsincaoan	424	440	320	248	235	Cabugao
Nagsingcaoan	284	286	204	163	166	Galimuyod
Nagsupotan	1,292	1,254	1,171	1,113	1,020	San Juan (Lapog)
Nagtablaan	423	421	366	358	346	Santa Lucia
Nagtengnga	931	905	874	719	685	Santa Cruz
Nagtupacan	780	766	621	567	617	Santa Maria
Naguiddayan	609	581	468	443	365	Bantay
Naguilian	1,283	1,247	1,300	1,322	1,276	Caoayan
Naguimba	984	887	884	837	890	Banayoyo
Naguneg	1,887	1,854	1,618	1,600	1,572	Narvacan
Nalasin	590	575	593	512	493	Santiago
Nalasin	1,335	1,247	1,121	985	940	Santo Domingo
Nalvo	1,531	1,478	1,427	1,368	1,316	Santa Maria
Namalangan	754	754	698	721	764	Santa
Namalpalan	930	822	768	718	668	Magsingal
Namatican	703	669	571	583	591	Santa Lucia
Nambaran	1,278	1,287	1,200	1,008	1,002	Santo Domingo
Namitpit	1,234	1,135	1,032	971	1,011	Quirino (Angkaki)
Namnama (Poblacion)	784	718	841	772	747	Sinait
Namruangan	1,773	1,714	1,529	1,298	1,260	Cabugao
Nanerman	541	503	492	439	383	Santo Domingo
Nangalisan	979	894	813	665	733	Santa Lucia
Nansuagao	665	647	474	410	396	Caoayan
Napo	843	936	825	809	767	Magsingal
Napo	546	519	555	498	351	Santo Domingo
Oaig-Daya	1,771	1,867	1,627	1,319	1,479	Candon
Oaig-Daya	311	312	262	247	249	Galimuyod
Olo-olo Norte	912	938	855	778	788	Santiago
Olo-olo Sur	397	342	407	375	381	Santiago
Ora	2,103	2,028	1,718	1,466	1,499	Bantay
Orence	1,810	1,686	1,602	1,502	1,398	Narvacan
Oribi	152	134	141	137	137	Santa
Otol-Patac	393	371	289	269	217	San Ildefonso
Pacac	800	755	652	550	468	Tagudin
Pacang	696	679	589	522	499	Santa Maria
Pacis	611	615	633	597	533	Sinait
Padaoil	597	566	546	466	485	Santa Cruz
Padu Chico	946	866	753	713	656	Santo Domingo
Padu Grande	298	288	303	299	271	Santo Domingo
Paduros	686	649	654	634	511	Burgos
Pagangpang	460	557	510	541	477	Galimuyod
Pagsanaan Norte	546	527	509	523	517	Magsingal
Pagsanaan Sur	594	591	524	474	461	Magsingal
Paguraper	384	408	464	447	361	Santo Domingo
Paing	1,554	1,567	1,557	1,552	1,306	Bantay
Palacapac	761	778	743	669	647	Candon
Palali Norte	991	913	898	818	829	Santa Lucia
Palali Sur	909	882	824	736	700	Santa Lucia
Pallogan	841	824	785	586	582	Tagudin
Paltoc	569	571	–	519	1,009	San Emilio
Panay	174	171	147	142	148	Santo Domingo
Panay Norte	1,181	1,097	1,056	927	1,002	Magsingal
Panay Sur	640	646	714	639	633	Magsingal
Pandan	1,170	1,123	1,084	1,072	1,071	Caoayan
Pandayan (Poblacion)	815	674	666	608	610	San Juan (Lapog)
Pangada	820	842	861	706	709	Santa Catalina
Pangotan	342	296	246	253	262	Sugpon
Pangpangdan	555	520	554	509	438	Santo Domingo
Pantay-Quitiquit	361	352	302	305	271	Caoayan
Pantay Daya	2,323	2,327	1,977	1,832	1,485	Vigan
Pantay Fatima	2,513	2,678	2,116	1,849	1,802	Vigan
Pantay Laud	717	679	688	641	696	Vigan
Pantay Tamurong	1,884	1,998	1,778	1,673	1,849	Caoayan
Pantoc	1,073	1,120	991	886	805	Narvacan
Paoa	823	889	676	607	537	Vigan
Paoc Norte	783	707	725	636	663	Santa Lucia
Paoc Sur	331	310	321	287	292	Santa Lucia
Parada	789	596	684	671	587	Santo Domingo
Paras	1,193	1,329	997	852	694	Candon
Paras	719	644	551	520	456	Santo Domingo
Paratong	1,594	1,601	1,332	1,143	1,172	Narvacan
Paratong	1,111	865	836	695	738	Santa Catalina
Paratong	625	484	554	550	532	Santa Cruz
Paratong	704	656	706	552	540	Santa Lucia
Paratong	1,393	1,363	1,191	1,102	1,027	Sinait
Paratong	1,267	1,119	999	925	873	Vigan
Parioc Primero	1,182	1,256	1,000	1,022	1,024	Candon
Parioc Segundo	1,557	1,591	1,515	1,302	1,310	Candon
Parparia	1,221	1,174	1,179	1,058	1,051	Narvacan
Pasungol	534	501	488	497	483	Santa
Patac	234	237	230	231	189	Burgos
Patac	1,333	1,343	1,159	1,116	1,071	Galimuyod
Patiacan	957	779	702	911	941	Quirino (Angkaki)
Patoc-ao	695	638	593	555	499	Suyo
Patong	1,480	1,451	1,314	1,300	1,213	Magsingal
Patpata Primero	1,008	1,064	946	807	847	Candon
Patpata Segundo	1,597	1,525	1,429	1,239	1,236	Candon
Pattiqui	706	596	573	521	515	Santa Cruz
Patungcaleo (Lamag)	1,081	881	781	693	608	Quirino (Angkaki)
Paypayad	2,233	1,854	1,475	1,344	1,395	Candon
Penned	193	176	169	144	189	Santa Maria
Pias	483	414	461	449	406	Salcedo (Baugen)
Pidpid	751	722	720	632	612	Santa Cruz
Pila	218	212	206	153	187	Banayoyo
Pila	744	667	672	497	548	Cabugao
Pila East	665	601	552	491	536	Santa Lucia
Pila West	539	518	478	414	474	Santa Lucia
Pilar	1,450	1,393	1,256	1,053	938	Santa Cruz
Pilipil	422	333	361	549	370	Cervantes
Pinipin	1,154	1,013	1,014	967	988	Santa Cruz
Poblacion	1,064	990	1,071	902	778	Banayoyo
Poblacion	502	539	455	447	412	Galimuyod
Poblacion	782	784	814	736	718	San Esteban
Poblacion	1,221	1,226	1,168	1,069	1,106	San Vicente
Poblacion	1,422	1,340	1,287	1,314	1,224	Santa Catalina
Poblacion	891	812	868	799	905	Santo Domingo
Poblacion (Kimpusa)	1,917	1,929	1,675	1,683	1,510	Suyo
Poblacion (Madayaw)	289	252	240	245	227	Sigay
Poblacion East	471	464	341	311	260	Nagbukel
Poblacion East	643	759	635	586	545	San Ildefonso
Poblacion Este	730	777	750	694	620	Santa Cruz
Poblacion Norte	483	531	481	475	403	Gregorio del Pilar
Poblacion Norte	920	874	800	883	874	Lidlidda
Poblacion Norte	898	819	807	791	761	Salcedo (Baugen)
Poblacion Norte	1,041	1,347	1,358	1,409	1,410	Santa Maria
Poblacion Norte	408	378	412	426	425	Santiago
Poblacion Norte (Bato)	322	338	323	280	277	Burgos
Poblacion North	905	909	829	674	625	Santa Cruz
Poblacion Sur	495	486	562	490	416	Gregorio del Pilar
Poblacion Sur	322	262	319	285	253	Lidlidda
Poblacion Sur	608	614	566	525	526	Salcedo (Baugen)
Poblacion Sur	578	610	673	624	606	Santa Cruz
Poblacion Sur	1,981	2,401	2,020	2,253	2,054	Santa Maria
Poblacion Sur	539	542	504	482	419	Santiago
Poblacion Sur (Masingit)	165	179	178	177	200	Burgos
Poblacion West	500	512	554	501	465	Nagbukel
Poblacion West	561	545	528	538	459	San Ildefonso
Poblacion Weste	431	410	363	326	279	Santa Cruz
Pong-ol	494	543	481	407	331	Vigan
Pudoc	2,277	2,267	2,272	2,088	2,210	San Vicente
Pudoc East	1,679	1,247	1,263	1,017	813	Tagudin
Pudoc West	1,413	1,456	1,342	1,117	944	Tagudin
Puerta Real	881	831	667	679	641	Santo Domingo
Pug-os	1,824	1,929	1,645	1,545	1,439	Cabugao
Pula	476	428	373	314	335	Tagudin
Purag	510	520	458	414	389	Sinait
Puro	1,207	1,255	1,170	1,118	1,119	Caoayan
Puro	4,193	4,222	3,733	3,241	2,180	Magsingal
Purok-a-bassit	559	553	453	398	369	Vigan
Purok-a-dackel	850	535	485	427	435	Vigan
Puspus	500	430	422	433	378	Bantay
Pussuac	1,040	955	831	705	678	Santo Domingo
Quezon (Poblacion)	2,066	1,966	1,756	1,792	1,726	Cabugao
Quezon (Poblacion)	360	366	453	407	380	Santa
Quibit-quibit	442	441	451	417	418	Sinait
Quimmallogong	368	322	381	338	282	Sinait
Quimmarayan	546	545	503	465	440	Bantay
Quimmarayan	1,107	1,076	1,018	954	824	Santo Domingo
Quinabalayangan	262	212	193	167	189	Santa Lucia
Quinarayan	2,616	2,554	2,367	2,125	2,028	Narvacan
Quinfermin	232	234	192	176	160	Santa Cruz
Quinsoriano	430	415	371	334	316	Santa Cruz
Quirino (Poblacion)	353	320	333	332	254	Santa
Quirino (Poblacion)	727	795	684	712	683	Tagudin
Rancho	664	614	608	606	633	Santa
Rang-ay (Poblacion)	572	519	560	551	626	Sinait
Ranget	1,134	1,053	989	860	871	Tagudin
Raois	1,459	1,362	1,295	1,218	1,398	Vigan
Refaro	1,318	1,232	1,124	1,092	1,032	San Juan (Lapog)
Remedios	975	799	809	698	695	Cervantes
Reppaac	344	358	365	337	329	Cabugao
Resurreccion (Poblacion)	1,003	934	1,086	1,049	955	San Juan (Lapog)
Ricudo	486	415	473	405	344	Sinait
Rivadavia	609	606	555	554	587	Narvacan
Rizal	809	735	666	575	615	Santa
Rizal (Poblacion)	1,382	1,179	1,283	1,228	1,233	Cabugao
Rizal (Poblacion)	762	847	817	819	783	Tagudin
Ronda	724	704	560	716	791	Santa Lucia
Rosario (Poblacion)	1,985	1,705	1,658	1,509	1,278	Cervantes
Rubio	619	577	412	457	422	Galimuyod
Rugsuanan	709	973	1,013	974	863	Vigan
Sabang	1,326	1,303	1,140	1,045	923	Cabugao
Sabangan	594	563	542	502	522	San Juan (Lapog)
Sabangan	1,166	1,134	969	961	916	Santiago
Sabangan-Bato	502	484	439	399	340	Galimuyod
Sabangan (Marcos)	885	820	660	665	637	Sinait
Sabangan Pinggan	336	350	303	287	275	Burgos
Sabuanan	1,373	1,392	1,319	1,180	1,160	Santa Lucia
Sacaang	376	392	330	315	285	Galimuyod
Sacuyya Norte	849	774	747	673	776	Santa
Sacuyya Sur	580	471	550	490	465	Santa
Sagat	1,153	1,142	977	960	915	Santa Cruz
Sagayaden	1,004	923	975	830	833	Cabugao
Sagneb	366	310	284	268	231	Bantay
Sagneb	341	331	305	266	248	San Ildefonso
Sagpat	718	687	605	531	450	Bantay
Sagsagat	651	565	468	469	333	San Ildefonso
Salapasap	1,688	1,501	1,345	1,220	1,235	Cabugao
Salincub	779	602	604	572	596	Santiago
Salindeg	1,273	1,185	1,078	966	890	Vigan
Sallacapo	347	329	338	324	321	Sinait
Salomague	1,576	1,520	1,464	1,234	1,290	Cabugao
Salvacion	464	449	440	378	353	Tagudin
Salvador Primero	902	849	768	633	761	Candon
Salvador Segundo	728	716	674	653	640	Candon
San Agustin	1,482	1,203	1,065	860	901	Candon
San Andres	665	729	625	561	432	Candon
San Antonio	1,855	1,849	1,589	1,475	1,414	Narvacan
San Antonio	413	387	313	258	222	Santa Cruz
San Antonio (Poblacion)	1,071	977	1,164	1,083	974	Candon
San Basilio (Poblacion)	489	562	541	527	530	Magsingal
San Clemente (Poblacion)	1,029	1,048	904	854	936	Magsingal
San Elias	428	458	430	412	380	Sigay
San Gaspar	379	381	283	289	295	Salcedo (Baugen)
San Isidro	779	804	683	651	579	Bantay
San Isidro	829	844	744	729	706	San Juan (Lapog)
San Isidro (Poblacion)	2,024	2,076	2,028	1,786	1,863	Candon
San Jose	591	590	567	541	612	Santa Cruz
San Jose	790	821	796	598	642	Vigan
San Jose (Baraoas)	309	268	239	208	176	Santiago
San Jose (Poblacion)	1,899	2,104	2,091	1,977	1,848	Candon
San Jose (Poblacion)	1,459	1,459	1,274	1,259	1,264	Narvacan
San Juan	1,942	1,563	1,497	1,496	1,417	Cervantes
San Juan	811	779	800	665	591	Santa Lucia
San Juan (Poblacion)	903	962	1,031	1,048	1,001	Candon
San Julian	894	845	764	758	769	Bantay
San Julian (Poblacion)	552	566	558	496	519	Magsingal
San Julian Norte	2,305	2,388	1,612	1,339	1,450	Vigan
San Julian Sur	1,080	998	1,045	830	839	Vigan
San Lucas (Poblacion)	685	699	584	613	652	Magsingal
San Luis	827	706	784	732	677	Cervantes
San Mariano (Sallacong)	326	319	275	235	214	Bantay
San Miguel	388	388	327	284	254	Tagudin
San Miliano	664	696	–	572	–	San Emilio
San Nicolas	2,412	2,338	2,020	1,606	1,371	Candon
San Nicolas	961	907	860	737	725	San Esteban
San Pablo	1,171	1,140	1,035	937	921	Narvacan
San Pablo	876	845	833	774	653	San Esteban
San Pablo	873	895	849	759	757	Santo Domingo
San Pedro	1,317	726	525	517	414	Candon
San Pedro	1,956	1,825	1,819	1,564	1,685	Narvacan
San Pedro	517	555	472	453	433	Santa Cruz
San Pedro	446	382	371	322	345	Santa Lucia
San Pedro	1,227	1,289	1,231	1,269	1,009	Vigan
San Rafael	689	658	588	516	569	San Esteban
San Ramon	506	520	501	457	410	Sigay
San Ramon (Poblacion)	913	992	931	886	831	Magsingal
San Roque	860	833	809	713	701	Santiago
San Sebastian	2,821	2,933	2,586	2,324	2,452	San Vicente
San Tiburcio	541	493	354	319	285	Salcedo (Baugen)
San Vicente	239	244	281	269	274	Galimuyod
San Vicente	398	329	389	334	319	Lidlidda
San Vicente (Poblacion)	771	804	711	714	783	Magsingal
Santa Cruz	604	583	519	492	439	Santo Domingo
Santa Cruz	847	910	789	746	758	Sinait
Santa Lucia (Poblacion)	1,616	1,634	1,519	1,458	1,486	Narvacan
Santa Monica	650	700	678	693	698	Magsingal
Santo Rosario	438	419	427	357	278	Sigay
Santo Tomas	814	716	709	676	644	Candon
Santo Tomas	442	415	427	415	369	Santo Domingo
Saoang	860	906	891	735	774	San Juan (Lapog)
Saoat	376	312	366	320	310	Santa Cruz
Sapang	267	299	238	242	205	Galimuyod
Sapang	467	426	381	299	335	Santa Lucia
Sapriana	535	534	487	454	410	Sinait
Sarmingan	663	515	600	548	600	Narvacan
Sarsaracat	715	717	739	638	612	Magsingal
Sawat	835	820	682	596	609	Tagudin
Sevilla	1,520	1,378	1,480	1,346	1,338	Santa Cruz
Sibsibbu	657	609	–	575	502	San Emilio
Sidaoen	959	829	855	655	555	Santa Cruz
Silag	1,290	1,266	1,137	1,018	1,014	Santa Maria
Sinabaan	622	577	540	496	421	Bantay
Sinabaan	1,226	1,289	1,162	1,050	1,035	Santa Catalina
Sisim	625	563	608	588	629	Cabugao
Sived	785	749	772	725	702	Santo Domingo
Solotsolot	775	771	728	669	736	San Juan (Lapog)
Sorioan	656	636	634	612	587	Salcedo (Baugen)
Suagayan	718	734	718	799	664	Quirino (Angkaki)
Suagayan	434	468	383	306	321	Santa Lucia
Subadi Norte	405	391	355	315	297	Burgos
Subadi Sur	159	144	136	98	106	Burgos
Subec	1,188	1,297	1,397	1,176	1,241	Santa Catalina
Sucoc	1,474	1,359	1,263	1,205	1,345	Narvacan
Suksukit	418	385	356	354	328	Santo Domingo
Sulvec	1,800	1,867	1,750	1,522	2,116	Narvacan
Sumagui	253	211	224	184	181	Santa Maria
Sunggiam	929	916	766	662	566	San Juan (Lapog)
Surngit	361	412	429	370	292	San Juan (Lapog)
Suso	2,027	1,908	2,110	1,655	1,557	Santa Maria
Suyo	995	1,012	975	933	818	Santa Cruz
Suyo Proper	1,650	1,621	1,557	1,404	1,261	Suyo
Suysuyan	314	287	303	294	268	Lidlidda
Tablac	2,954	3,034	2,686	2,472	2,317	Candon
Tabucolan	224	221	291	297	421	Santa
Taguiporo	1,237	973	964	746	578	Bantay
Taleb	1,688	1,636	1,492	1,345	1,278	Bantay
Taleb	586	563	637	547	502	Nagbukel
Taliao	593	587	573	515	476	Burgos
Tallaoen	952	875	833	760	794	Tagudin
Talogtog	1,834	1,723	1,461	1,352	1,240	Candon
Tamag	2,846	2,832	2,218	2,038	1,854	Vigan
Tamorong	2,654	2,562	2,259	1,828	2,048	Santa Catalina
Tampugo	341	274	258	213	201	Santa Cruz
Tampugo	1,187	1,100	1,072	875	934	Tagudin
Tamurong Primero	1,401	1,391	1,308	1,159	1,170	Candon
Tamurong Segundo	835	895	758	701	680	Candon
Tangaoan	1,169	1,092	1,042	966	952	Santa Maria
Tapao	762	840	706	730	674	Sinait
Tarangotong	212	173	213	100	119	Tagudin
Tay-ac	2,439	2,272	2,262	2,193	1,985	Bantay
Tay-ac	146	109	145	103	97	Lidlidda
Teppeng	1,307	1,309	1,147	1,025	1,005	Sinait
Tiagan	1,647	1,498	–	1,258	1,193	San Emilio
Tinaan	1,053	847	845	825	790	Santa Maria
Tubigay	391	401	383	364	359	Sinait
Turod	1,413	1,366	1,174	1,009	942	Cabugao
Turod	687	682	564	530	538	Narvacan
Turod	457	468	487	374	315	Santa Cruz
Turod-Patac	771	759	626	569	500	Cabugao
Ubbog	169	159	157	163	160	Salcedo (Baugen)
Ubbog	619	517	634	562	563	Santiago
Ubbog	287	241	248	234	232	Sinait
Urzadan	789	688	608	557	491	Suyo
Uso	1,234	1,219	1,115	921	825	Suyo
Vacunero	1,097	1,120	991	882	857	Santo Domingo
Vical	796	851	726	650	595	Santa Lucia
Villa Garcia	950	952	919	754	759	Santa Cruz
Villa Hermosa	1,573	1,342	1,301	1,045	874	Santa Cruz
Villa Laurencia	282	246	235	208	173	Santa Cruz
Villa Quirino	391	380	344	302	345	San Esteban
Villamar	1,507	1,471	–	–	–	Caoayan
Villarica	456	412	373	336	295	Candon
Zapat	316	336	408	360	333	Sinait
Barangay	2010	2007	2000	1995	1990	City or municipality
*Italicized names are former names.; *Dashes (–) in cells indicate unavailable census data.

[top]
