= San Esteban, Ilocos Sur =

Municipality in Ilocos Sur, Philippines

San Esteban
- Municipality
- Municipality of San Esteban
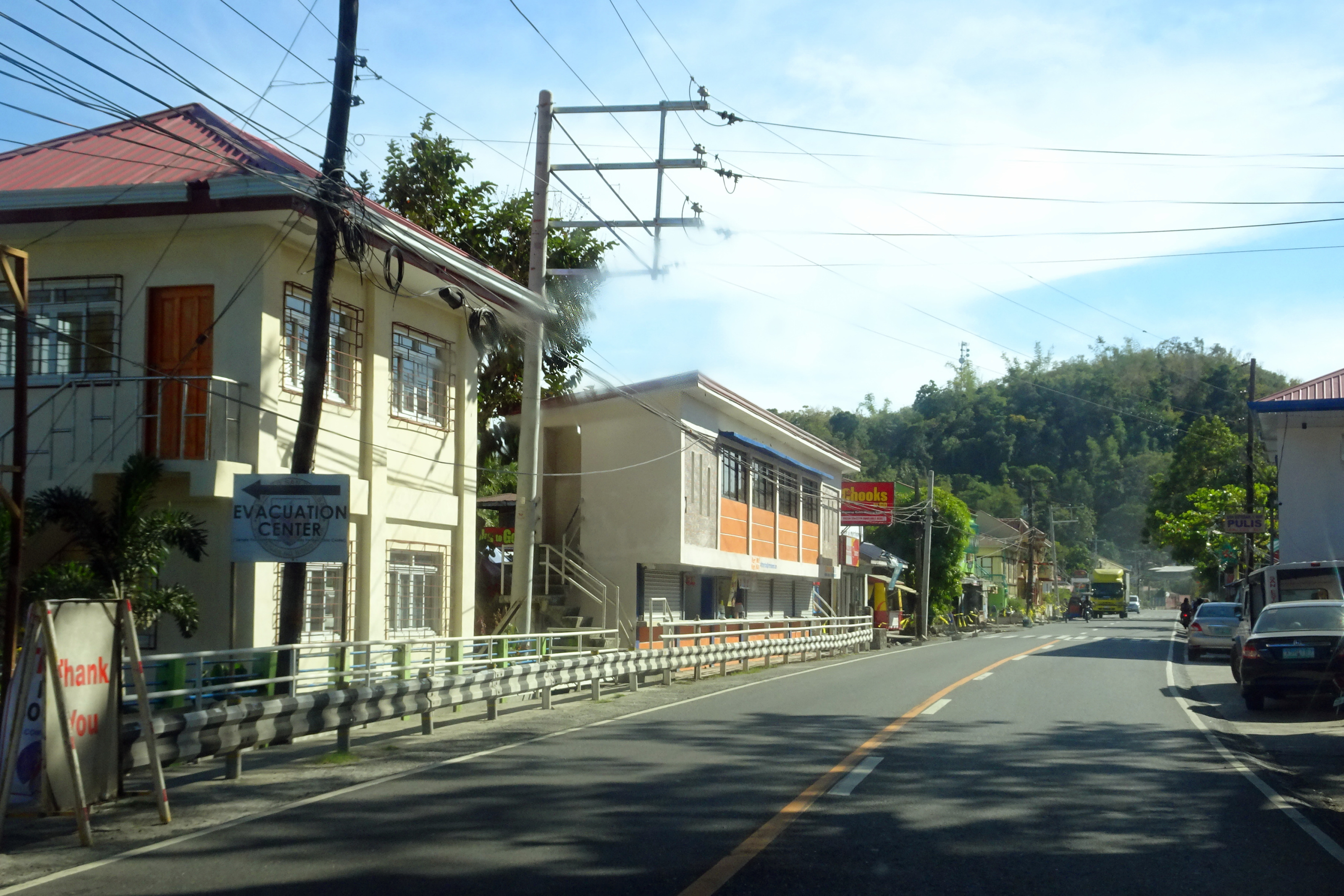
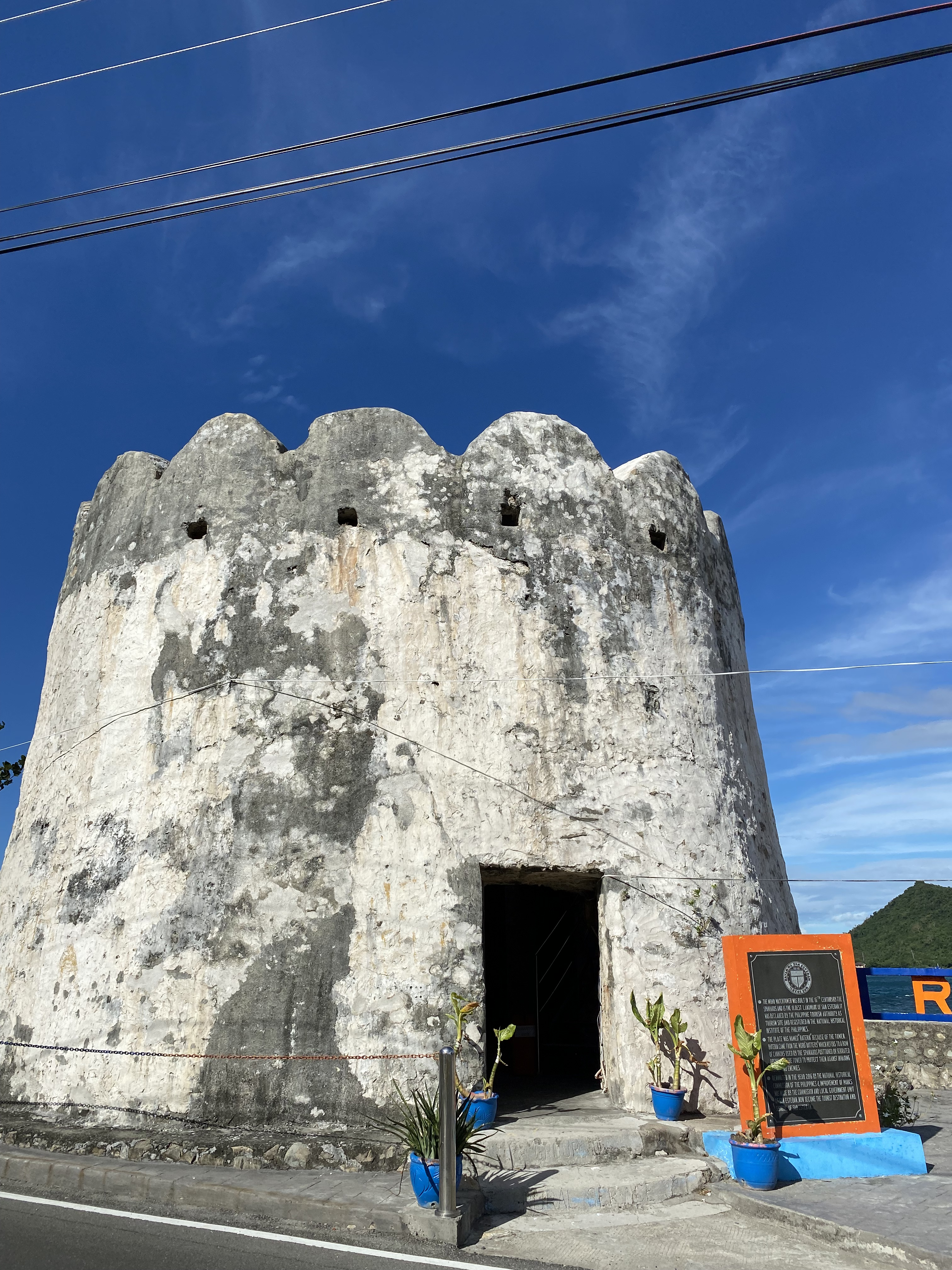
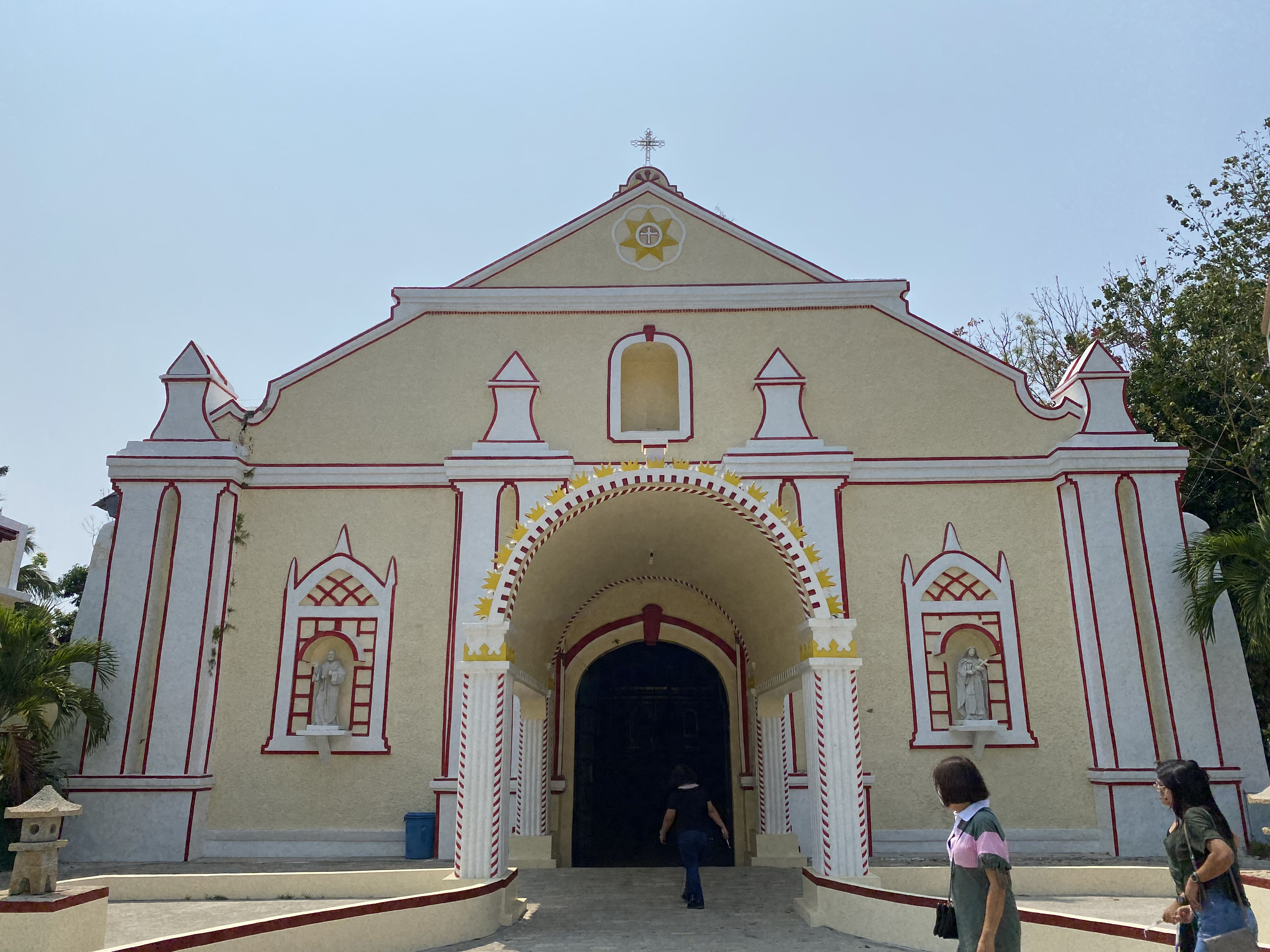
- MacArthur Highway along San Esteban Brgy. Bateria Spanish colonial watchtower St. Stephen Protomartyr Parish Church

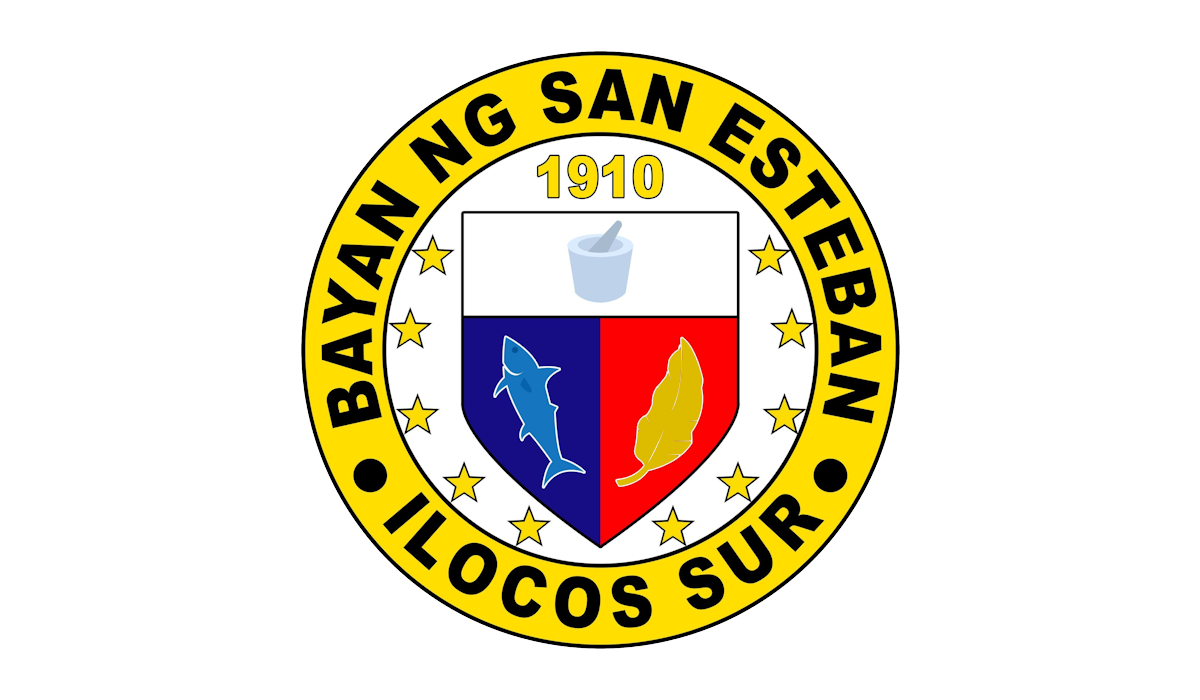
- Flag Seal

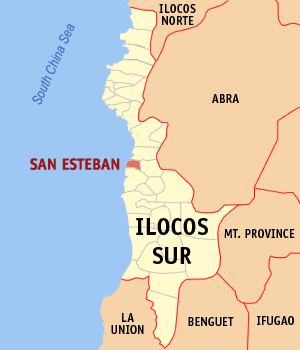
- Map of Ilocos Sur with San Esteban highlighted
- Interactive map of San Esteban
- Location within the Philippines
- Coordinates: 17°19′56″N 120°26′43″E
- Country: Philippines
- Region: Ilocos Region
- Province: Ilocos Sur
- District: 2nd district
- Barangays: 10 (see Barangays)

Government
  - Type: Sangguniang Bayan
  - Mayor: Ray M. Elaydo II
  - Vice Mayor: Ray A. Elaydo
  - Representative: Kristine Singson-Meehan
  - Municipal Council: Members: Godofredo E. Tabila; Arlene A. Europa; Ariel L. Santos; Marvin B. Ong; Elfren A. Elaydo Jr.; Helen A. Eleccion; Roger C. Ysmael; Henry A. Eleccion
  - Electorate: 6,293 voters (2025)

Area
  - Total: 19.62 km^{2} (7.58 sq mi)
- Elevation: 30 m (98 ft)
- Highest elevation: 257 m (843 ft)
- Lowest elevation: 0 m (0 ft)

Population (2024 census)
  - Total: 8,621
  - Density: 439.4/km^{2} (1,138/sq mi)
  - Households: 2,150

Economy
  - Income class: 1st municipal income class
  - Poverty incidence: 6.01% (2023)
  - Revenue: ₱ 497.2 million (2024)
  - Assets: ₱ 1,997 million (2024)
  - Expenditure: ₱ 138 million (2024)
  - Liabilities: ₱ 93.87 million (2024)

Service provider
  - Electricity: Ilocos Sur Electric Cooperative (ISECO)
- Time zone: UTC+8 (PST)
- ZIP code: 2706
- PSGC: 0102918000
- IDD : area code: +63 (0)77
- Native languages: Ilocano; Tagalog

San Esteban, officially the Municipality of San Esteban (Ilocano: Ili ti San Esteban; Filipino: Bayan ng San Esteban), is a municipality in the province of Ilocos Sur, Philippines. According to the 2024 census, it has a population of 8,621 people.

== Etymology ==
The Spaniards named the pueblo (the equivalent of a municipality in present-day terms) San Esteban (formerly known as Cabagbagototan) purportedly in relation to reports they received about a vagabond named Iban having been stoned to death and beheaded by hostile natives in the place called "Naglawlawayan," which is an early place of worship by the natives and currently the site of the municipal cemetery. "Iban" is the Ilocano equivalent of "Stephen," hence the pueblo being named San Esteban.

San Esteban was founded by Augustinian friars in 1625, but was always attached to Nueva Coveta (present-day Burgos) and the municipality of Santiago until 1911. It was once a visita of Narvacan because of a shortage of ministers.

== Geography ==
San Esteban is situated 43.91 kilometres (27.28 mi) from the provincial capital Vigan, and 360.53 kilometres (224.02 mi) from the country's capital city of Manila.

=== Barangays ===
San Esteban is politically subdivided into 10 barangays. Each barangay consists of puroks and some have sitios.

- Ansad
- Apatot
- Bateria
- Cabaroan
- Cappa-Cappa
- Poblacion
- San Nicolas
- San Pablo
- San Rafael
- Villa Quirino

=== Climate ===
Climate data for San Esteban, Ilocos Sur
Month	Jan	Feb	Mar	Apr	May	Jun	Jul	Aug	Sep	Oct	Nov	Dec	Year
Mean daily maximum °C (°F)	30 (86)	31 (88)	33 (91)	34 (93)	33 (91)	31 (88)	30 (86)	30 (86)	30 (86)	31 (88)	31 (88)	30 (86)	31 (88)
Mean daily minimum °C (°F)	19 (66)	20 (68)	21 (70)	23 (73)	25 (77)	25 (77)	25 (77)	25 (77)	24 (75)	22 (72)	21 (70)	20 (68)	23 (73)
Average precipitation mm (inches)	10 (0.4)	10 (0.4)	14 (0.6)	23 (0.9)	80 (3.1)	103 (4.1)	121 (4.8)	111 (4.4)	119 (4.7)	144 (5.7)	39 (1.5)	15 (0.6)	789 (31.2)
Average rainy days	5.2	3.9	6.2	9.1	18.5	21.4	22.9	19.8	19.8	16.2	10.5	6.1	159.6
Source: Meteoblue (modeled/calculated data, not measured locally)

== Demographics ==
In the 2024 census, San Esteban had a population of 8,621 people. The population density was 440 inhabitants per square kilometre (1,100/sq mi).

Population census of San Esteban

Year	Pop.	±% p.a.
1903	2,421	—
1918	3,372	+2.23%
1939	3,363	−0.01%
1948	3,617	+0.81%
1960	4,269	+1.39%
1970	4,848	+1.28%
1975	5,275	+1.71%
1980	5,504	+0.85%

Year	Pop.	±% p.a.
1990	6,327	+1.40%
1995	6,508	+0.53%
2000	7,174	+2.11%
2007	7,779	+1.12%
2010	8,072	+1.35%
2015	8,349	+0.64%
2020	8,381	+0.08%
2024	8,621	+0.68%

Source: Philippine Statistics Authority

== Economy ==
Poverty incidence of San Esteban (%)

Source: Philippine Statistics Authority

== Government ==
=== Local government ===
San Estaban, belonging to the second congressional district of the province of Ilocos Sur, is governed by a mayor designated as its local chief executive and by a municipal council as its legislative body in accordance with the Local Government Code. The mayor, vice mayor, and the councilors are elected directly by the people through an election which is being held every three years.

=== Elected officials ===
Members of the Municipal Council (2019–2022)

- Congressman: Kristine Singson-Meehan
- Mayor: Ray M. Elaydo II
- Vice-Mayor: Ray A. Elaydo
- Councilors:
  - Godofredo E. Tabila
  - Arlene A. Europa
  - Ariel L. Santos
  - Marvin B. Ong
  - Elfren A. Elaydo Jr.
  - Helen A. Eleccion
  - Roger C. Ysmael
  - Henry A. Eleccion

== Education ==
The Burgos-San Esteban Schools District Office governs all schools within the municipality of San Esteban. Also oversees all schools located in Burgos.

=== Primary and elementary schools ===
- Ansad Elementary School
- Apatot Community School
- San Esteban North Central School
- San Esteban South Central School

=== Secondary school ===
- San Esteban National High School
- San Esteban Academy
