= Philippine Science High School Ilocos Region Campus =

Public high school in Ilocos Sur, Philippines

Philippine Science High School Ilocos Region Campus in Ilocos Sur

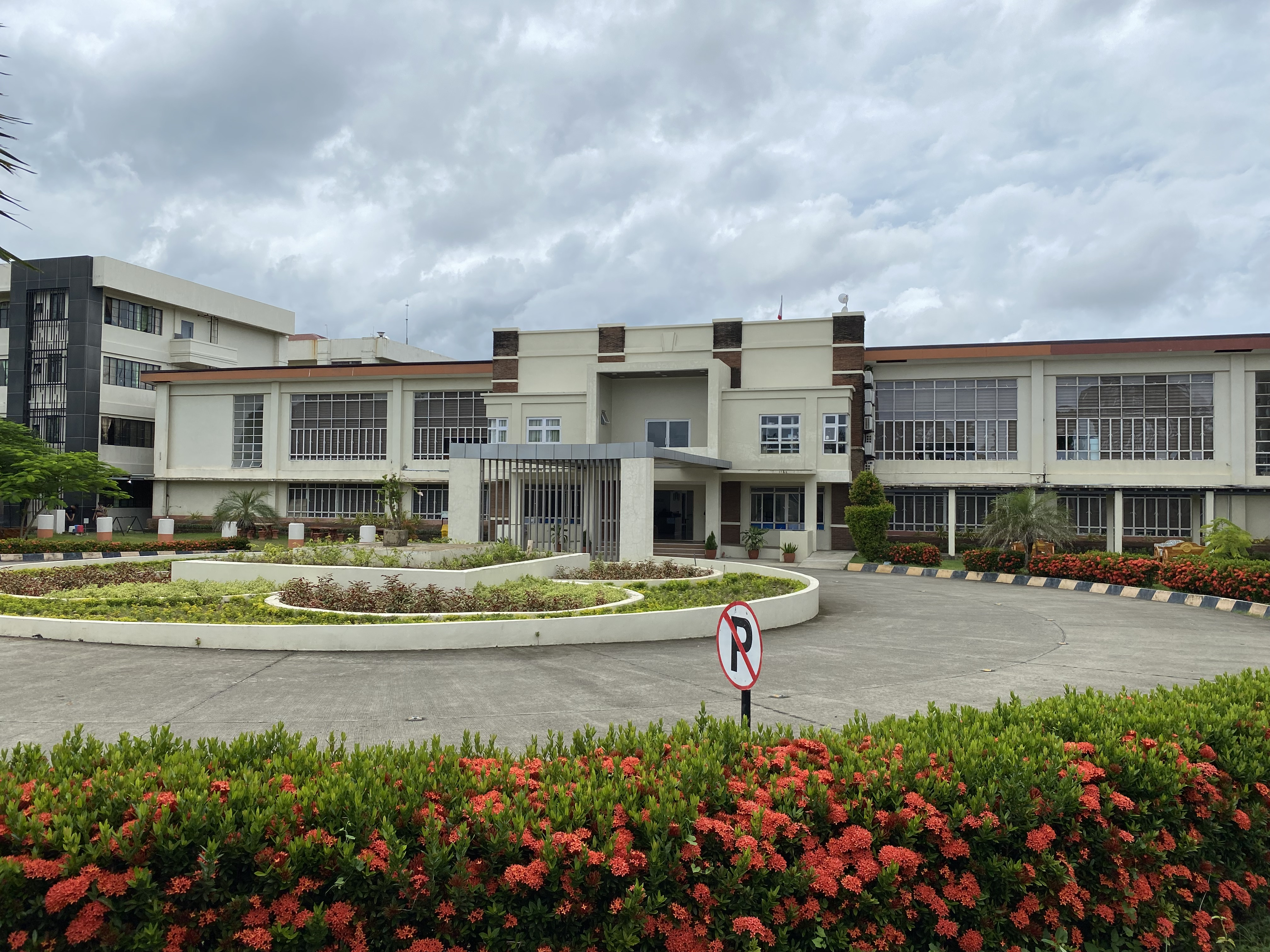
- Administration building

Location
- San Ildefonso, Ilocos Sur; Philippines; 17°37′27.55″N 120°24′3.38″E

Information
- Type: Public specialized high school
- Established: February 6, 2002
- Grades: 7 to 12
- Language: English, Filipino
- Affiliation: Department of Science and Technology
- Website: irc.pshs.edu.ph

Philippine Science High School Ilocos Region Campus (PSHS–IRC) in Ilocos Sur is a public secondary education institution in San Ildefonso, Ilocos Sur, Philippines. As part of the Philippine Science High School System, PSHS–IRC is intended to cater to students gifted in science and mathematics in the Ilocos Region.

== History ==
The establishment of the Philippine Science High School Ilocos Region Campus was initiated by House of Representatives member Salacnib Baterina. Republic Act 9036 explicitly states San Ildefonso, Ilocos Sur as a site for consideration for a PSHS campus in Ilocos Region The PSHS Board of Trustees approved the creation of the Ilocos Region Campus on February 6, 2002 with the school opening on July 14, 2003.

The Expanded PSHS System Act or Republic Act No. 12310 proposed the establishment of a second Ilocos campus in Laoag. Due to this, PSHS-IRC renamed its official name to The Philippine Science High School - Ilocos Region Campus in Ilocos Sur in October of 2025.
