= San Ildefonso, Ilocos Sur =

Municipality in Ilocos Sur, Philippines

San Ildefonso
- Municipality
- Municipality of San Ildefonso
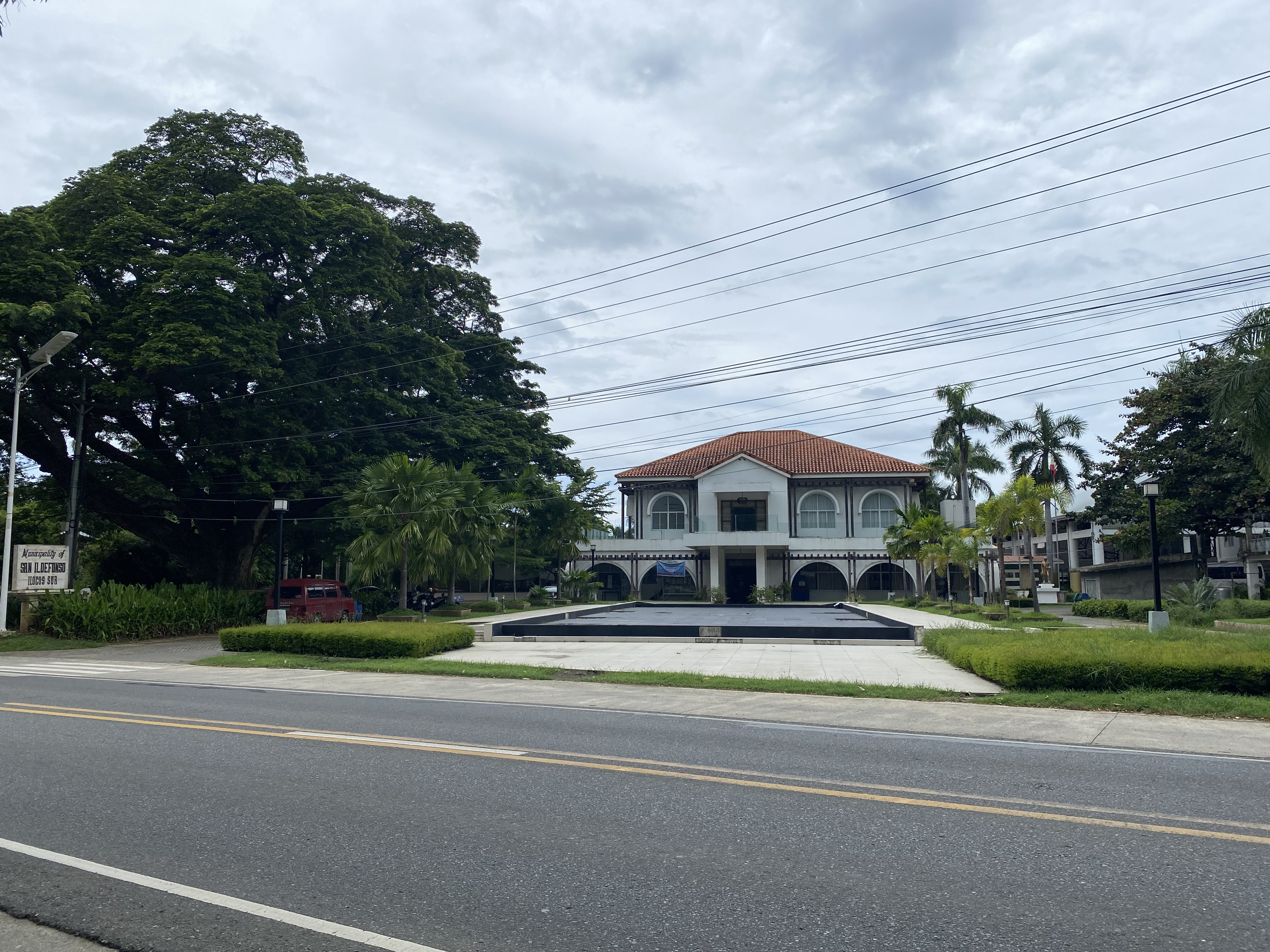
- Municipal hall building

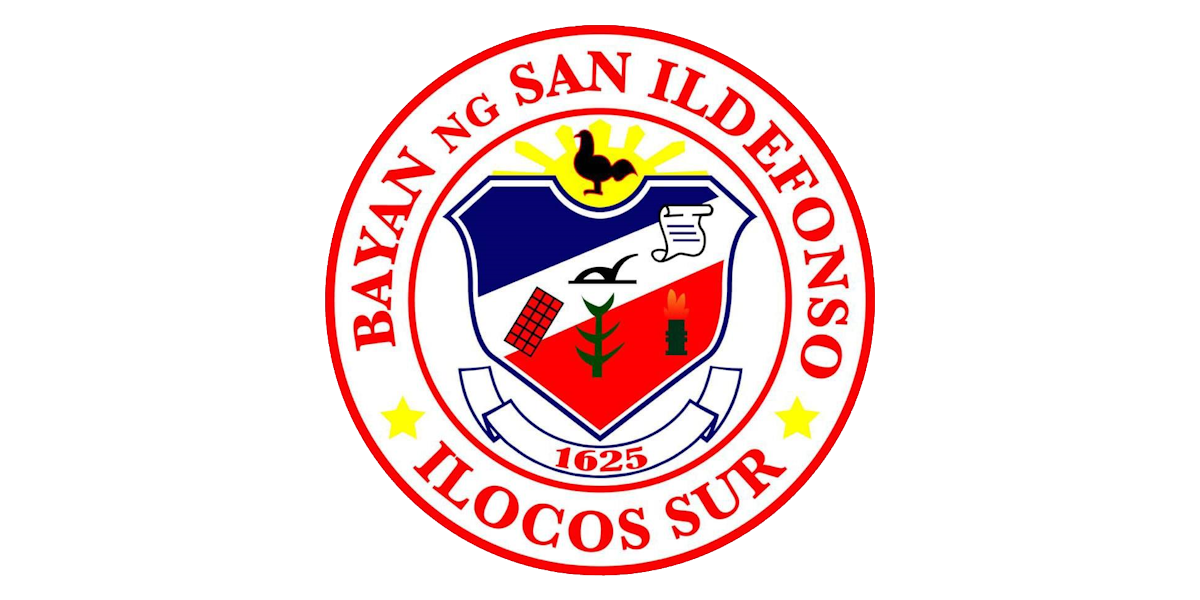
- Flag
- Motto: Progreso San Ildefonso! (Progress San Ildefonso)
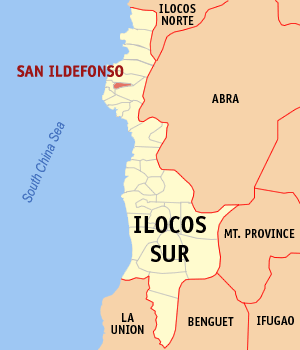
- Map of Ilocos Sur with San Ildefonso highlighted
- Interactive map of San Ildefonso
- Location within the Philippines
- Coordinates: 17°37′38″N 120°23′38″E
- Country: Philippines
- Region: Ilocos Region
- Province: Ilocos Sur
- District: 1st district
- Founded: March 1625
- Named for: Saint Ildefonsus
- Barangays: 15 (see Barangays)

Government
  - Type: Sangguniang Bayan
  - Mayor: Christian Daniel A. Purisima
  - Vice Mayor: Robert R. Riego
  - Representative: Deogracias Victor B. Savellano
  - Municipal Council: Members: Nona T. Purisima; Mariano M. Pamo Jr.; Luzminda D. Padua; Nelson T. Retreta; Efren J. Pola; Renato P. Pecho; Richard A. Palomares; Cesar R. Revibes
  - Electorate: 6,198 voters (2025)

Area
  - Total: 11.35 km^{2} (4.38 sq mi)
- Elevation: 10 m (33 ft)
- Highest elevation: 47 m (154 ft)
- Lowest elevation: 0 m (0 ft)

Population (2024 census)
  - Total: 8,213
  - Density: 723.6/km^{2} (1,874/sq mi)
  - Households: 1,976

Economy
  - Income class: 2nd municipal income class
  - Poverty incidence: 2.91% (2023)
  - Revenue: ₱ 252.7 million (2024)
  - Assets: ₱ 711.1 million (2024)
  - Expenditure: ₱ 162.8 million (2024)
  - Liabilities: ₱ 31.39 million (2024)

Service provider
  - Electricity: Ilocos Sur Electric Cooperative (ISECO)
- Time zone: UTC+8 (PST)
- ZIP code: 2728
- PSGC: 0102919000
- IDD : area code: +63 (0)77
- Native languages: Ilocano; Tagalog

San Ildefonso, officially the Municipality of San Ildefonso (Ilocano: Ili ti San Ildefonso; Filipino: Bayan ng San Ildefonso), is a municipality in the province of Ilocos Sur, Philippines. According to the 2024 census, it has a population of 8,213 people.

== Etymology ==
The town was named after Saint Ildephonsus, a 7th century scholar and theologian.

== History ==
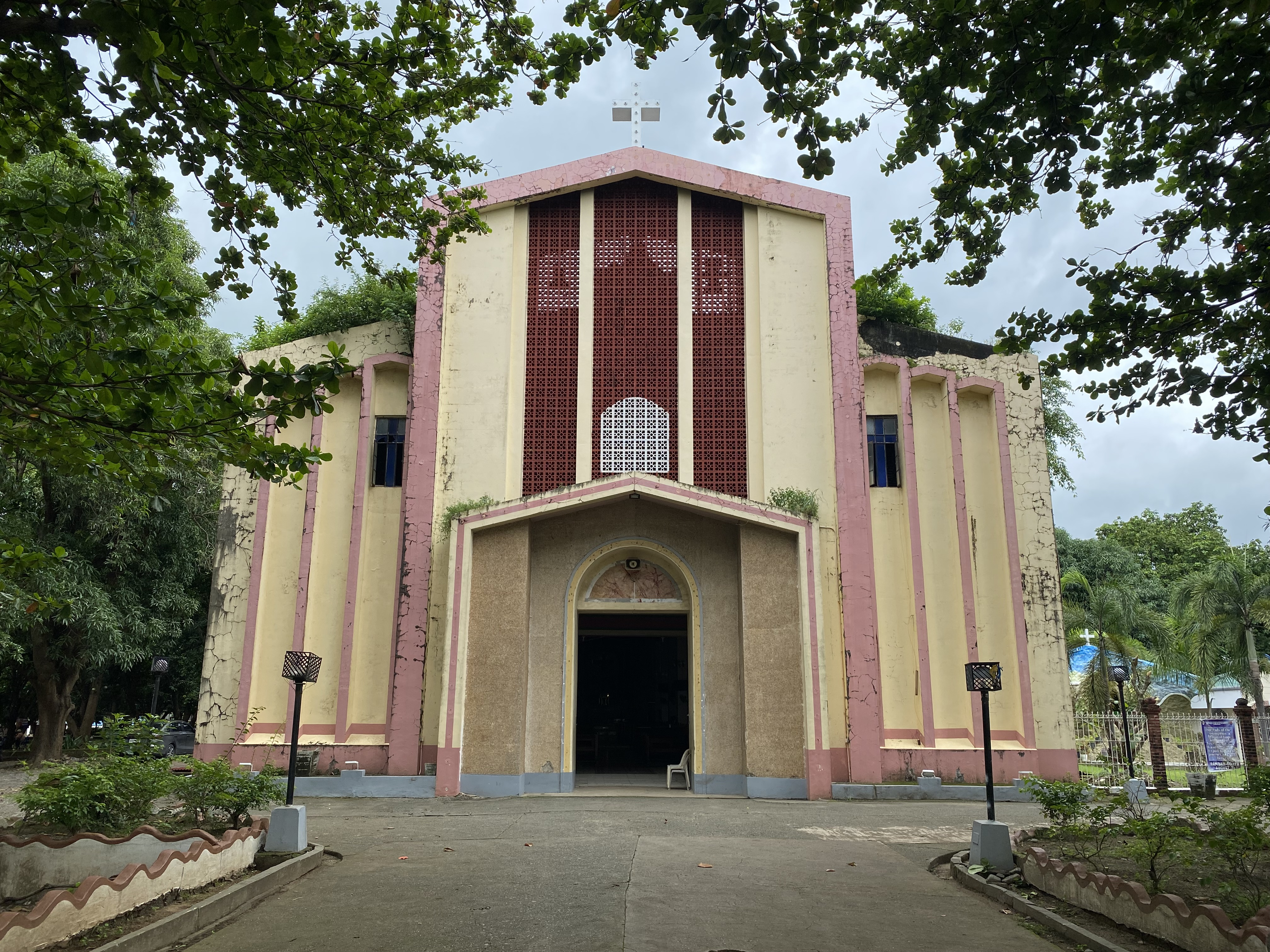
Saint Ildephonsus Parish Church

San Ildefonso, like many other places in the provinces at the beginning of the Spanish Regime, did not have a name. Stories have it that sometime in 1625, the town's inhabitants decided to give it a name, but nothing came out after more than five hours of discussions. So while thinking of a name, they decided to go fishing for a week. And while preparing to go fishing, they saw a box floating not far from shore. Wading to reach the box and carrying it ashore, they opened the box to find a statue of Saint Ildephonsus.

The young women of the place carried the statue to the center of the village, where it was enshrined in a small hut for many years. He became the patron saint of the municipality, and his name was decided to become the name of the fledgling municipality.

San Ildefonso was a former rancheria of Bantay before it became a municipality, but because of its size it was annexed to Santo Domingo as a barrio. In 1921, Assemblyman (and future Philippine president) Elpidio Quirino worked to convert San Ildefonso into a municipality again.

=== 200th Anniversary of Basi Revolt ===
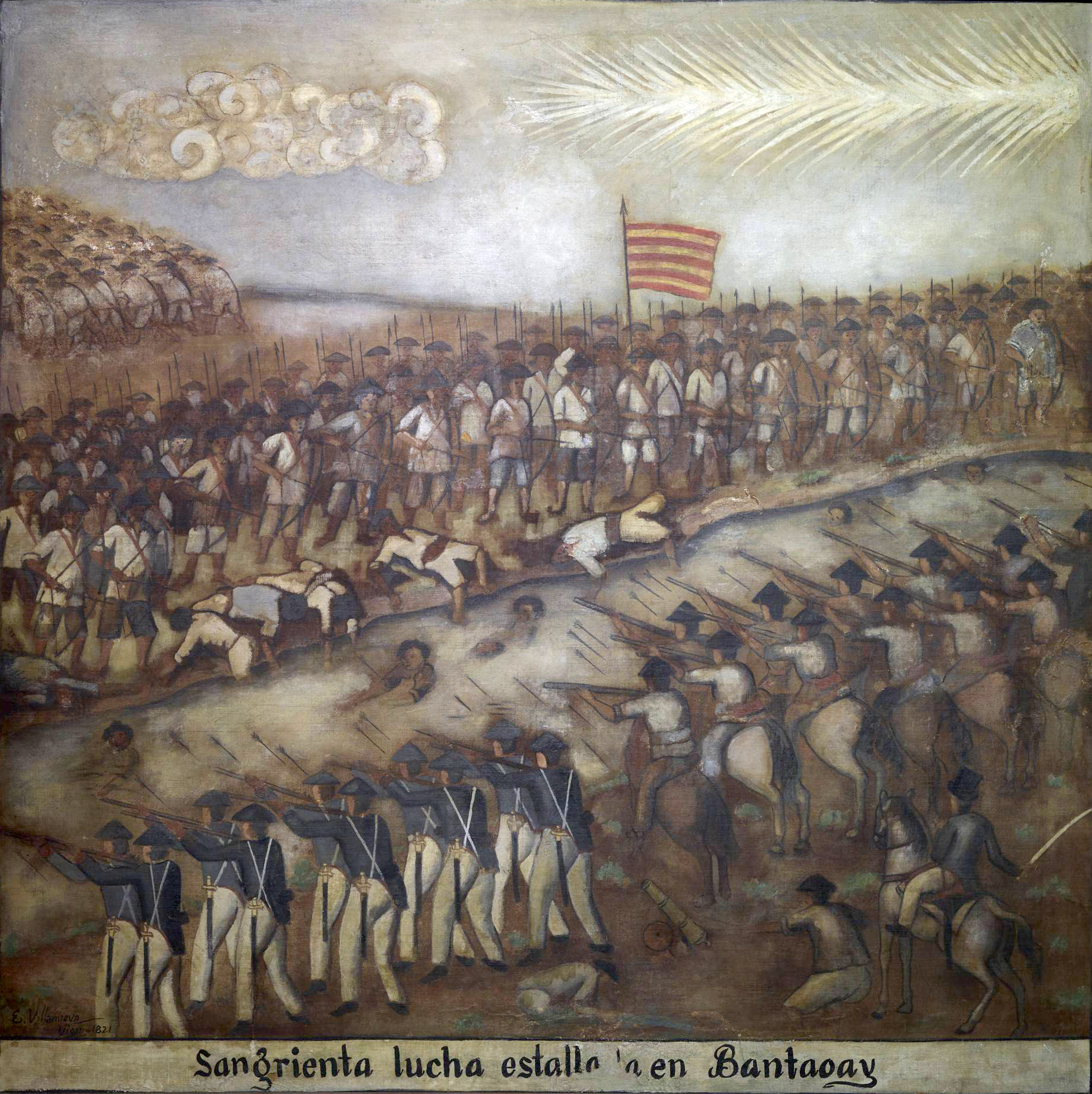
Portrait of the Basi Revolt between the Ilocanos and local Spanish at the Bantaoay River by Esteban Villanueva, c. 1807

On September 28, 2007, San Ildefonso officials (Governor Deogracias Victor Savellano and Rep. Ronald Singson) commemorated the Basi Revolt. Recently, the Sangguniang Bayan of San Ildefonso approved a resolution declaring September 16 as a non-working holiday and named the old road in Barangay Gongogong as Ambaristo street in honor of Pedro Ambaristo, leader of the Basi Revolt. Mayor Christian Purisima enrolled basi as their entry into the “One Town; One Product” (OTOP) program of Governor Savellano.

== Geography ==
San Ildefonso is situated 6.58 kilometres (4.09 mi) from the provincial capital Vigan, and 408.65 kilometres (253.92 mi) from the country's capital city of Manila.

=== Barangays ===
San Ildefonso is politically subdivided into 15 barangays. Each barangay consists of puroks and some have sitios.

- Arnap
- Bahet
- Belen
- Bungro
- Busiing Norte
- Busiing Sur
- Dongalo
- Gongogong
- Iboy
- Kinamantirisan
- Otol-Patac
- Poblacion East
- Poblacion West
- Sagneb
- Sagsagat

=== Climate ===
Climate data for San Ildefonso, Ilocos Sur
Month	Jan	Feb	Mar	Apr	May	Jun	Jul	Aug	Sep	Oct	Nov	Dec	Year
Mean daily maximum °C (°F)	30 (86)	31 (88)	33 (91)	34 (93)	33 (91)	31 (88)	30 (86)	30 (86)	30 (86)	31 (88)	30 (86)	29 (84)	31 (88)
Mean daily minimum °C (°F)	19 (66)	19 (66)	21 (70)	23 (73)	25 (77)	25 (77)	24 (75)	24 (75)	24 (75)	22 (72)	21 (70)	19 (66)	22 (72)
Average precipitation mm (inches)	9 (0.4)	11 (0.4)	13 (0.5)	23 (0.9)	92 (3.6)	122 (4.8)	153 (6.0)	137 (5.4)	139 (5.5)	141 (5.6)	42 (1.7)	14 (0.6)	896 (35.4)
Average rainy days	4.6	4.0	6.2	9.1	19.5	23.2	24.0	22.5	21.5	15.2	10.5	6.0	166.3
Source: Meteoblue (modeled/calculated data, not measured locally)

== Demographics ==
Population census of San Ildefonso
Year	Pop.	±% p.a.
1903	2,137	—
1939	2,227	+0.11%
1948	2,034	−1.00%
1960	2,601	+2.07%
1970	3,400	+2.71%
1975	3,249	−0.91%
1980	3,640	+2.30%
1990	4,528	+2.21%
1995	5,232	+2.74%
2000	5,584	+1.41%
2007	6,670	+2.48%
2010	7,075	+2.17%
2015	7,787	+1.84%
2020	8,190	+1.07%
2024	8,213	+0.07%
Source: Philippine Statistics Authority

In the 2024 census, San Ildefonso had a population of 8,213 people. The population density was 720 inhabitants per square kilometre (1,900/sq mi).

== Economy ==
Poverty incidence of San Ildefonso (%)

Source: Philippine Statistics Authority

The town is rich in rice, corn, sugarcane, malunggay, katuday & fruit-bearing trees such as star apple, chico, mango, camachile & atis. Its main product is basi, a wine made from fermented sugarcane juice; as well as cane vinegar. They also make nutritious ice cream made up of vegetables in Barangay Bungro, and is being popularized by the town's local government.

== Government ==
=== Local government ===
San Ildefonso, belonging to the first congressional district of the province of Ilocos Sur, is governed by a mayor designated as its local chief executive and by a municipal council as its legislative body in accordance with the Local Government Code. The mayor, vice mayor, and the councilors are elected directly by the people through an election which is being held every three years.

=== Elected officials ===
Members of the Municipal Council (2019–2022)
Position	Name
Congressman	Deogracias Victor B. Savellano
Mayor	Christian Daniel A. Purisima
Vice-Mayor	Robert R. Riego
Councilors	Nona T. Purisima
Councilors	Mariano M. Pamo Jr.
Councilors	Luzminda D. Padua
Councilors	Nelson T. Retreta
Councilors	Efren J. Pola
Councilors	Renato P. Pecho
Councilors	Richard A. Palomares
Councilors	Cesar R. Revibes

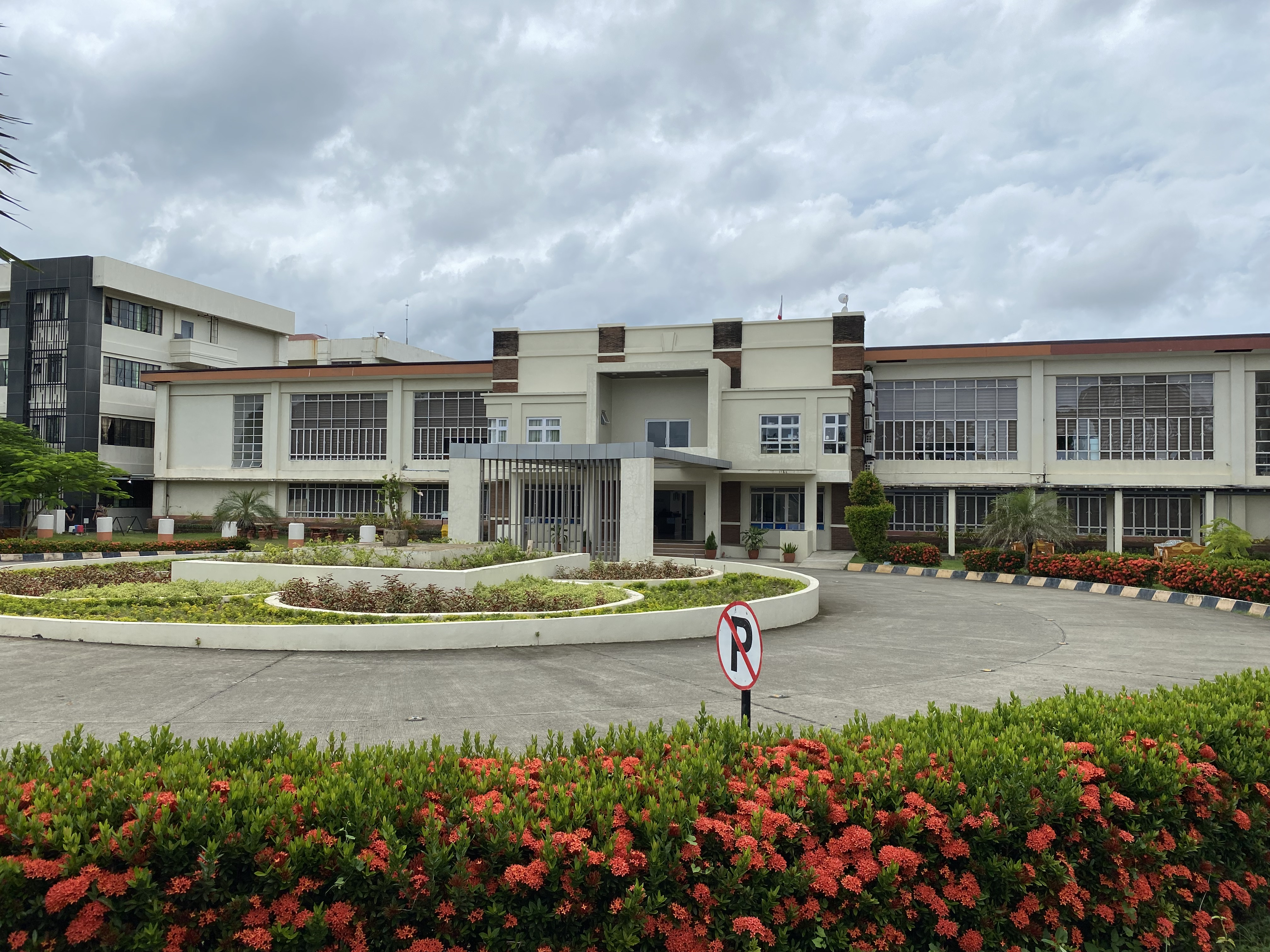
Philippine Science High School - Ilocos Region Campus

== Education ==
The Sto. Domingo-San Ildefonso Schools District Office governs all educational institutions within the municipality. They also oversee the operations of all private and public elementary and high schools located in Santo Domingo, Ilocos Sur.

=== Primary and elementary schools ===
- Bungro Elementary School
- Busiing Elementary School
- Sagsagat Elementary School
- San Ildefonso Central School

=== Secondary schools ===
- Belen National High School
- Philippine Science High School - Ilocos Region Campus
