= Burgos, Ilocos Sur =

Municipality in Ilocos Sur, Philippines

Burgos
- Municipality
- Municipality of Burgos
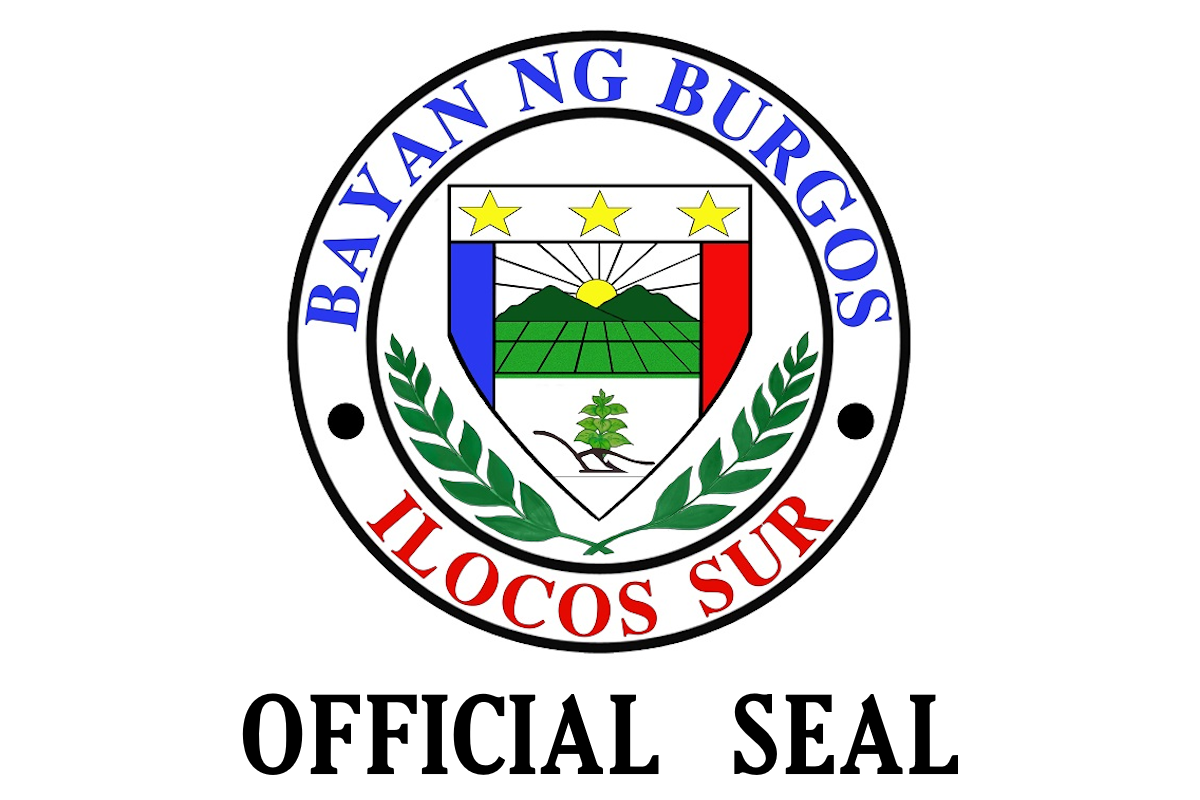
- Flag Seal
- Motto: Ayos Burgos!
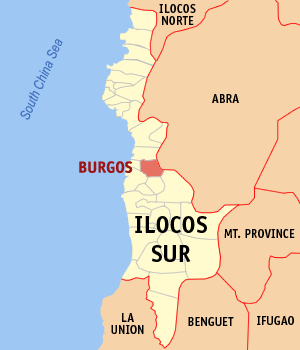
- Map of Ilocos Sur with Burgos highlighted
- Interactive map of Burgos
- Location within the Philippines
- Coordinates: 17°19′59″N 120°29′40″E
- Country: Philippines
- Region: Ilocos Region
- Province: Ilocos Sur
- District: 2nd district
- Named after: José Burgos
- Barangays: 26 (see Barangays)

Government
  - Type: Sangguniang Bayan
  - Mayor: Nathaniel D. Escobar
  - Vice Mayor: Riolita R. Balbalan
  - Representative: Kristine Singson-Meehan
  - Municipal Council: Members: Lester O. Fabrigas; Christopher S. Belen; Consuelo D. Brillantes; Roy A. Samuel; Floro L. Balbalan; Alexander R. Bumatay; Rodolfo V. Tamayo; Elisa E. Ortega
  - Electorate: 9,023 voters (2025)

Area
  - Total: 44.38 km^{2} (17.14 sq mi)
- Elevation: 71 m (233 ft)
- Highest elevation: 439 m (1,440 ft)
- Lowest elevation: 0 m (0 ft)

Population (2024 census)
  - Total: 13,026
  - Density: 293.5/km^{2} (760.2/sq mi)
  - Households: 3,135

Economy
  - Income class: 1st municipal income class
  - Poverty incidence: 7.18% (2023)
  - Revenue: ₱ 942.9 million (2024)
  - Assets: ₱ 2,507 million (2024)
  - Expenditure: ₱ 360.9 million (2024)
  - Liabilities: ₱ 105 million (2024)

Service provider
  - Electricity: Ilocos Sur Electric Cooperative (ISECO)
- Time zone: UTC+8 (PST)
- ZIP code: 2724
- PSGC: 0102904000
- IDD : area code: +63 (0)77
- Native languages: Ilocano; Tagalog

Burgos, officially the Municipality of Burgos (Ilocano: Ili ti Burgos; Filipino: Bayan ng Burgos) is a municipality in the province of Ilocos Sur, Philippines. According to the 2024 census, it has a population of 13,026 people.

== Etymology ==
Burgos got its name from Father José Burgos, a member of the martyred Gomburza priests and a native of Ilocos Sur.

== History ==
Burgos was first founded as the town of Nueva Coveta in 1831 when Father Bernardino Logo converted many natives into Christianity. It was envied by its neighbors because of its peace, order, and progress. Its products were sold in places as far south as Pangasinan and Tarlac.

It became a township of Santa Maria towards the end of the Spanish era in Ilocos Sur. It was later named in honor of Father José Burgos.

== Geography ==
Burgos is situated 41.52 kilometres (25.80 mi) from the provincial capital Vigan, and 370.85 kilometres (230.44 mi) from the country's capital city of Manila.

=== Barangays ===
Burgos is politically subdivided into 26 barangays, or neighborhoods. Each barangay consists of puroks and some have sitios.

- Ambugat
- Balugang
- Bangbangar
- Bessang
- Cabcaburao
- Cadacad
- Callitong
- Dayanki
- Dirdirig (Dirdirig-Padayao)
- Lesseb
- Lubing
- Lucaban
- Luna
- Macaoayan
- Mambug
- Manaboc
- Mapanit
- Nagpanaoan
- Paduros
- Patac
- Poblacion Norte (Bato)
- Poblacion Sur (Masingit)
- Sabangan Pinggan
- Subadi Norte
- Subadi Sur
- Taliao

=== Climate ===
Climate data for Burgos, Ilocos Sur
Month	Jan	Feb	Mar	Apr	May	Jun	Jul	Aug	Sep	Oct	Nov	Dec	Year
Mean daily maximum °C (°F)	30 (86)	31 (88)	33 (91)	34 (93)	32 (90)	31 (88)	30 (86)	30 (86)	30 (86)	31 (88)	31 (88)	30 (86)	31 (88)
Mean daily minimum °C (°F)	19 (66)	19 (66)	21 (70)	23 (73)	25 (77)	25 (77)	24 (75)	24 (75)	24 (75)	22 (72)	21 (70)	19 (66)	22 (72)
Average precipitation mm (inches)	10 (0.4)	10 (0.4)	14 (0.6)	23 (0.9)	80 (3.1)	103 (4.1)	121 (4.8)	111 (4.4)	119 (4.7)	144 (5.7)	39 (1.5)	15 (0.6)	789 (31.2)
Average rainy days	5.2	3.9	6.2	9.1	18.5	21.4	22.9	19.8	19.8	16.2	10.5	6.1	159.6
Source: Meteoblue (modeled/calculated data, not measured locally)

== Demographics ==
Population census of Burgos

Year	Pop.	±% p.a.
1903	1,412	—
1918	3,744	+6.72%
1939	4,225	+0.58%
1948	4,782	+1.39%
1960	5,804	+1.63%
1970	6,868	+1.70%

Year	Pop.	±% p.a.
1975	7,858	+2.74%
1980	8,364	+1.26%
1990	9,601	+1.39%
1995	10,101	+0.96%
2000	11,175	+2.19%
2007	11,459	+0.35%

Year	Pop.	±% p.a.
2010	11,679	+0.69%
2015	12,224	+0.87%
2020	12,793	+0.96%
2024	13,026	+0.43%

Source: Philippine Statistics Authority

In the 2024 census, Burgos had a population of 13,026 people. The population density was 290 inhabitants per square kilometre (750/sq mi).

== Economy ==
Poverty incidence of Burgos

Source: Philippine Statistics Authority

The economy of Burgos relies on agriculture, and local products. The town produces rice, corn, and tobacco. The town is the main producer of Balatinaw black/purple rice.

== Government ==
=== Local government ===
Burgos, belonging to the second congressional district of the province of Ilocos Sur, is governed by a mayor designated as its local chief executive and by a municipal council as its legislative body in accordance with the Local Government Code. The mayor, vice mayor, and the councilors are elected directly by the people through an election which is being held every three years.

=== Elected officials ===
Members of the Municipal Council (2025–2028)
Position	Name
Congressman	Kristine Singson-Meehan
Mayor	Annabelle F. Escobar
Vice-Mayor	Riolita R. Balbalan
Councilors	Rogelio F. Fabrigas
Councilors	Ben Marius Gabriel F. Escobar
Councilors	Christopher S. Belen
Councilors	Gerome Arthur C. Balbalan
Councilors	Avigael Joyce A. Ayson
Councilors	John R. Ortega
Councilors	Isabelo F. Degracia Jr.
Councilors	Rodolfo S. Reyes

== Education ==
The Burgos-San Esteban Schools District Office governs all schools within the municipality of Burgos. Also oversees all schools located in San Esteban.

=== Primary and elementary schools ===
- Bessang Elementary School
- Burgos Central School
- Cabcaburao Elementary School
- Lubing Elementary School
- Luna Community School
- Macaoayan Community School
- Mambug Elementary School
- Padayao Elementary School
- Patac Elementary School

=== Secondary school ===
- Burgos National High School
- Holy Name High School
