= Galimuyod =

Municipality in Ilocos Sur, Philippines

- Municipality
- Municipality of Galimuyod
- Seal
- Motto: Guyod Galimuyod!
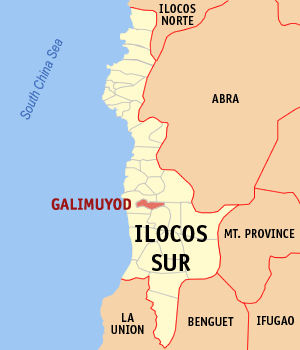
- Map of Ilocos Sur with Galimuyod highlighted
- Interactive map of Galimuyod
- Location within the Philippines
- Coordinates: 17°11′N 120°28′E
- Country: Philippines
- Region: Ilocos Region
- Province: Ilocos Sur
- District: 2nd district
- Barangays: 24 (see Barangays)

Government
  - Type: Sangguniang Bayan
  - Mayor: Jessie B. Balingsat
  - Vice Mayor: Kulapu R. Trinidad
  - Representative: Kristine Singson-Meehan
  - Municipal Council: Members: Marlon Combas; Minard N. Tumacdang; Maricel T. Balingsat; Beberly Joy D. Dario; Willy Gadingan; Florendo G. Olanio; Raymund M. Balbin; Jose D. Balbino Jr.
  - Electorate: 7,458 voters (2025)

Area
  - Total: 34.40 km^{2} (13.28 sq mi)
- Elevation: 39 m (128 ft)
- Highest elevation: 250 m (820 ft)
- Lowest elevation: 0 m (0 ft)

Population (2024 census)
  - Total: 10,263
  - Density: 298.3/km^{2} (772.7/sq mi)
  - Households: 2,496

Economy
  - Income class: 1st municipal income class
  - Poverty incidence: 5.07% (2023)
  - Revenue: ₱ 625.1 million (2024)
  - Assets: ₱ 1,251 million (2024)
  - Expenditure: ₱ 619.2 million (2024)
  - Liabilities: ₱ 76.36 million (2024)

Service provider
  - Electricity: Ilocos Sur Electric Cooperative (ISECO)
- Time zone: UTC+8 (PST)
- ZIP code: 2709
- PSGC: 0102909000
- IDD : area code: +63 (0)77
- Native languages: Ilocano; Tagalog

Galimuyod, officially the Municipality of Galimuyod (Ilocano: Ili ti Galimuyod; Filipino: Bayan ng Galimuyod), is a municipality in the province of Ilocos Sur, Philippines. According to the 2024 census, it has a population of 10,263 people.

== Etymology ==
The town, formerly known as Cabisilan, was once the largest barrio of Candon during the Spanish Colonial Era. A land dispute between them and the residents of neighboring Sapang - another barrio of Candon - was settled through a "gin-nuyod" (Ilocano for "tug-of-war") contest, a common game during those days. The people of Cabisilan won, allowing the settlement to become the center of barrios near it. The old folks renamed the barrio Galimuyod, from the Ilocano words tali ("rope") and ginuyod ("pulled").

== Geography ==
Galimuyod is situated 62.37 kilometres (38.75 mi) from the provincial capital Vigan, and 344.66 kilometres (214.16 mi) from the country's capital city of Manila.

=== Barangays ===
Galimuyod is politically subdivided into 24 barangays. Each barangay consists of puroks and some have sitios.

- Abaya
- Baracbac
- Bidbiday
- Bitong
- Borobor
- Calimugtong
- Calongbuyan
- Calumbaya
- Daldagan
- Kilang
- Legaspi
- Mabayag
- Matanubong
- Mckinley
- Nagsingcaoan
- Oaig-Daya
- Pagangpang
- Patac
- Poblacion
- Rubio
- Sabangan-Bato
- Sacaang
- San Vicente
- Sapang

=== Climate ===
Climate data for Galimuyod, Ilocos Sur
Month	Jan	Feb	Mar	Apr	May	Jun	Jul	Aug	Sep	Oct	Nov	Dec	Year
Mean daily maximum °C (°F)	30 (86)	31 (88)	32 (90)	34 (93)	32 (90)	31 (88)	30 (86)	30 (86)	30 (86)	31 (88)	31 (88)	30 (86)	31 (88)
Mean daily minimum °C (°F)	19 (66)	19 (66)	21 (70)	23 (73)	24 (75)	25 (77)	24 (75)	24 (75)	24 (75)	22 (72)	21 (70)	19 (66)	22 (72)
Average precipitation mm (inches)	10 (0.4)	10 (0.4)	14 (0.6)	23 (0.9)	80 (3.1)	103 (4.1)	121 (4.8)	111 (4.4)	119 (4.7)	144 (5.7)	39 (1.5)	15 (0.6)	789 (31.2)
Average rainy days	5.2	3.9	6.2	9.1	18.5	21.4	22.9	19.8	19.8	16.2	10.5	6.1	159.6
Source: Meteoblue (modeled/calculated data, not measured locally)

== Demographics ==
Population census of Galimuyod

Year	Pop.	±% p.a.
1918	2,849	—
1939	3,063	+0.35%
1948	3,418	+1.23%
1960	4,670	+2.63%
1970	5,288	+1.25%

Year	Pop.	±% p.a.
1975	6,281	+3.51%
1980	6,576	+0.92%
1990	7,941	+1.90%
1995	8,477	+1.23%
2000	8,879	+1.00%

Year	Pop.	±% p.a.
2007	10,310	+2.08%
2010	10,011	−1.07%
2015	10,748	+1.36%
2020	10,244	−1.01%
2024	10,263	+0.04%

Source: Philippine Statistics Authority

In the 2024 census, Galimuyod had a population of 10,263 people. The population density was 300 inhabitants per square kilometre (780/sq mi).

== Economy ==
Poverty incidence of Galimuyod (%)

Source: Philippine Statistics Authority

Galimuyod's main economic sources are agriculture and commerce. Galimuyod's main crops are tobacco, rice, corn, onions and bell peppers. Galimuyod also consists of retail shops, micro-enterprises, and markets.

== Government ==
=== Local government ===
Galimuyod, belonging to the second congressional district of the province of Ilocos Sur, is governed by a mayor designated as its local chief executive and by a municipal council as its legislative body in accordance with the Local Government Code. The mayor, vice mayor, and the councilors are elected directly by the people through an election which is being held every three years.

=== Elected officials ===
Members of the Municipal Council (2025–2028)
Position	Name
Congressman	Kristine Singson-Meehan
Mayor	Jessie B. Balingsat
Vice-Mayor	Kulapu R. Trinidad
Councilors	Wilson N. Pollosco
Councilors	Raymund M. Balbin
Councilors	Noli L. Gapate
Councilors	Willy G. Gadingan
Councilors	Elmo P. Jose
Councilors	Marlon J. Combas
Councilors	Jose D. Balbino Jr.
Councilors	Juanito B. Balingsat

== Education ==
The Salcedo-Galimuyod-Sigay-Del Pilar Schools District Office governs all private and public schools within the municipality of Galimuyod. The Schools District Office (SDO) also oversees the operations of all schools situated in Salcedo, Sigay, and Gregorio del Pilar.

=== Primary and elementary schools ===
- Baracbac Primary School
- Bidbiday Adventist Multigrade School
- Bidbiday Elementary School
- Bitong Elementary School
- Calimugtong Elementary School
- Galimuyod Integrated School (Elementary)
- Mckinley Primary School
- Pagangpang Elementary School
- Patac Elementary School

=== Secondary schools ===
- Pagangpang National High School
- Galimuyod Integrated School
