= Santiago, Ilocos Sur =

Municipality in Ilocos Sur, Philippines

Santiago
- Municipality
- Municipality of Santiago
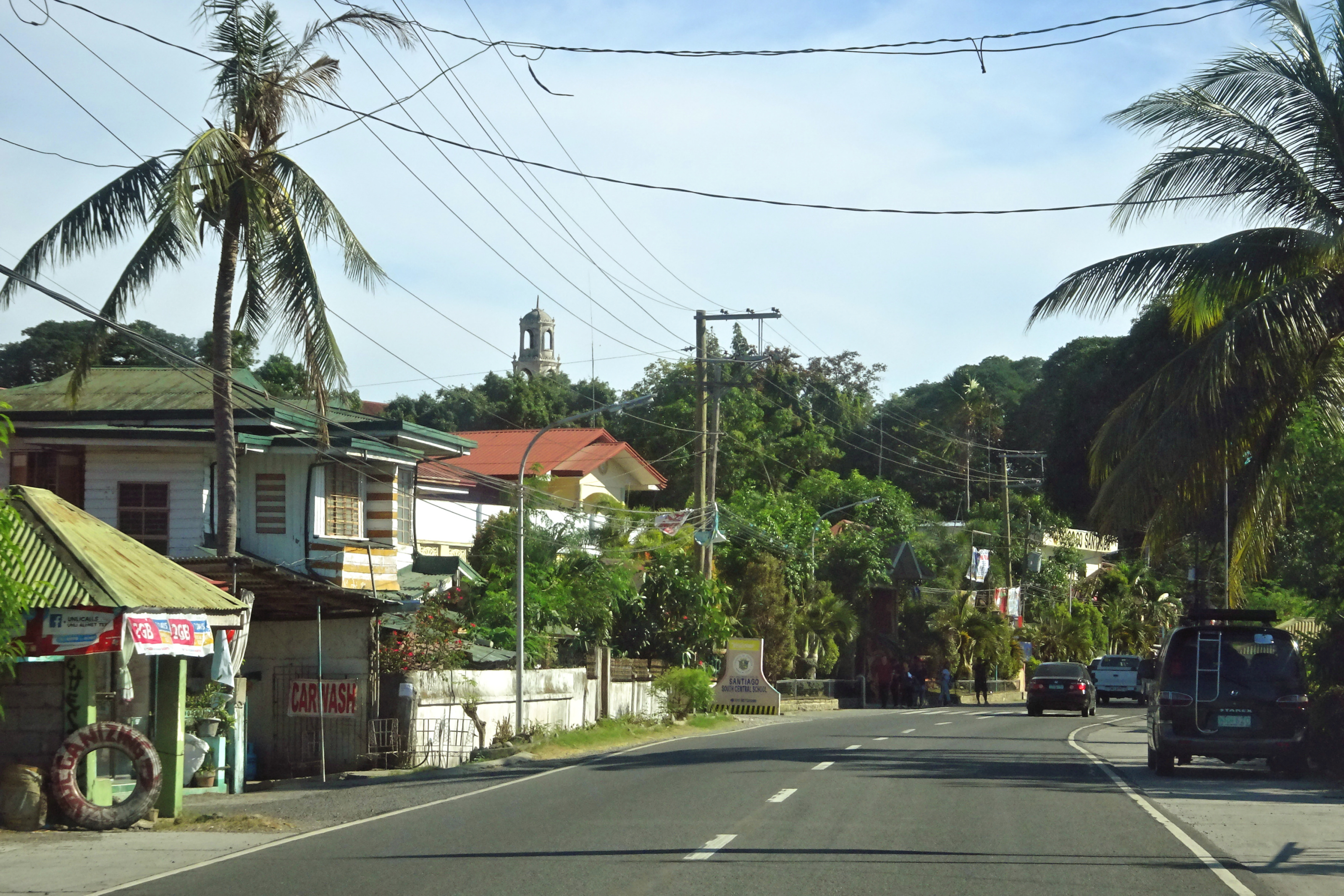
- MacArthur Highway along Santiago

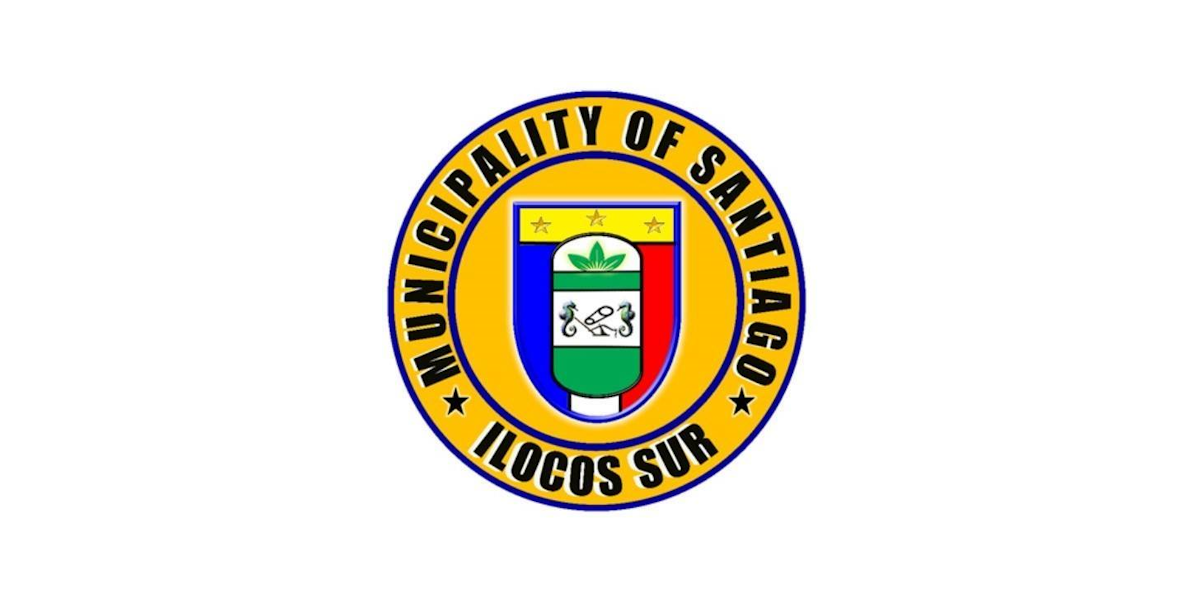
- Flag Seal
- Motto: Go Go Go Santiago!
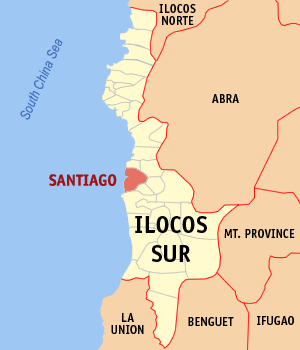
- Map of Ilocos Sur with Santiago highlighted
- Interactive map of Santiago
- Location within the Philippines
- Coordinates: 17°17′41″N 120°26′43″E
- Country: Philippines
- Region: Ilocos Region
- Province: Ilocos Sur
- District: 2nd district
- Named for: St. James the Great
- Barangays: 24 (see Barangays)

Government
  - Type: Sangguniang Bayan
  - Mayor: Josefino E. Miranda
  - Vice Mayor: Adrien Lawrence S. Miranda
  - Representative: Kristine Singson-Meehan
  - Municipal Council: Members: Joselito S. Miranda Jr.; Lydia B. Locquiao; Michael S. Miranda; Warlito H. Gacoscos; Virgilio C. Pasion; Eddie G. Carranza; Jonathan A. Trinidad; Ernesto C. Galano
  - Electorate: 13,984 voters (2025)

Area
  - Total: 46.36 km^{2} (17.90 sq mi)
- Elevation: 54 m (177 ft)
- Highest elevation: 257 m (843 ft)
- Lowest elevation: 0 m (0 ft)

Population (2024 census)
  - Total: 19,771
  - Density: 426.5/km^{2} (1,105/sq mi)
  - Households: 4,821

Economy
  - Income class: 1st municipal income class
  - Poverty incidence: 5.99% (2023)
  - Revenue: ₱ 626.1 million (2024)
  - Assets: ₱ 2,529 million (2024)
  - Expenditure: ₱ 163.9 million (2024)
  - Liabilities: ₱ 38.07 million (2024)

Service provider
  - Electricity: Ilocos Sur Electric Cooperative (ISECO)
- Time zone: UTC+8 (PST)
- ZIP code: 2707
- PSGC: 0102927000
- IDD : area code: +63 (0)77
- Native languages: Ilocano; Tagalog

Santiago, officially the Municipality of Santiago (Ilocano: Ili ti Santiago; Filipino: Bayan ng Santiago), is a municipality in the province of Ilocos Sur, Philippines. According to the 2024 census, it has a population of 19,771 people.

The town was named in honor of Saint James (Spanish: Santiago). One of the town's attractions, Santiago Cove, is dubbed as the "Boracay of Ilocos Sur" because of its white sand.

== Geography ==
Santiago is situated 48.20 kilometres (29.95 mi) from the provincial capital Vigan, and 355.92 kilometres (221.16 mi) from the country's capital city of Manila.

=== Barangays ===
Santiago is politically subdivided into 24 barangays. Each barangay consists of puroks and some have sitios.

- Al-aludig
- Ambucao
- San Jose (Baraoas)
- Baybayabas
- Bigbiga
- Bulbulala
- Busel-busel
- Butol
- Caburao
- Dan-ar
- Gabao
- Guinabang
- Imus
- Lang-ayan
- Mambug
- Nalasin
- Olo-olo Norte
- Olo-olo Sur
- Poblacion Norte
- Poblacion Sur
- Sabangan
- Salincub
- San Roque
- Ubbog

=== Climate ===
Climate data for Santiago, Ilocos Sur
Month	Jan	Feb	Mar	Apr	May	Jun	Jul	Aug	Sep	Oct	Nov	Dec	Year
Mean daily maximum °C (°F)	30 (86)	31 (88)	33 (91)	34 (93)	32 (90)	31 (88)	30 (86)	30 (86)	30 (86)	31 (88)	31 (88)	30 (86)	31 (88)
Mean daily minimum °C (°F)	19 (66)	20 (68)	21 (70)	23 (73)	25 (77)	25 (77)	25 (77)	24 (75)	24 (75)	22 (72)	21 (70)	19 (66)	22 (72)
Average precipitation mm (inches)	10 (0.4)	10 (0.4)	14 (0.6)	23 (0.9)	80 (3.1)	103 (4.1)	121 (4.8)	111 (4.4)	119 (4.7)	144 (5.7)	39 (1.5)	15 (0.6)	789 (31.2)
Average rainy days	5.2	3.9	6.2	9.1	18.5	21.4	22.9	19.8	19.8	16.2	10.5	6.1	159.6
Source: Meteoblue (modeled/calculated data, not measured locally)

== Demographics ==
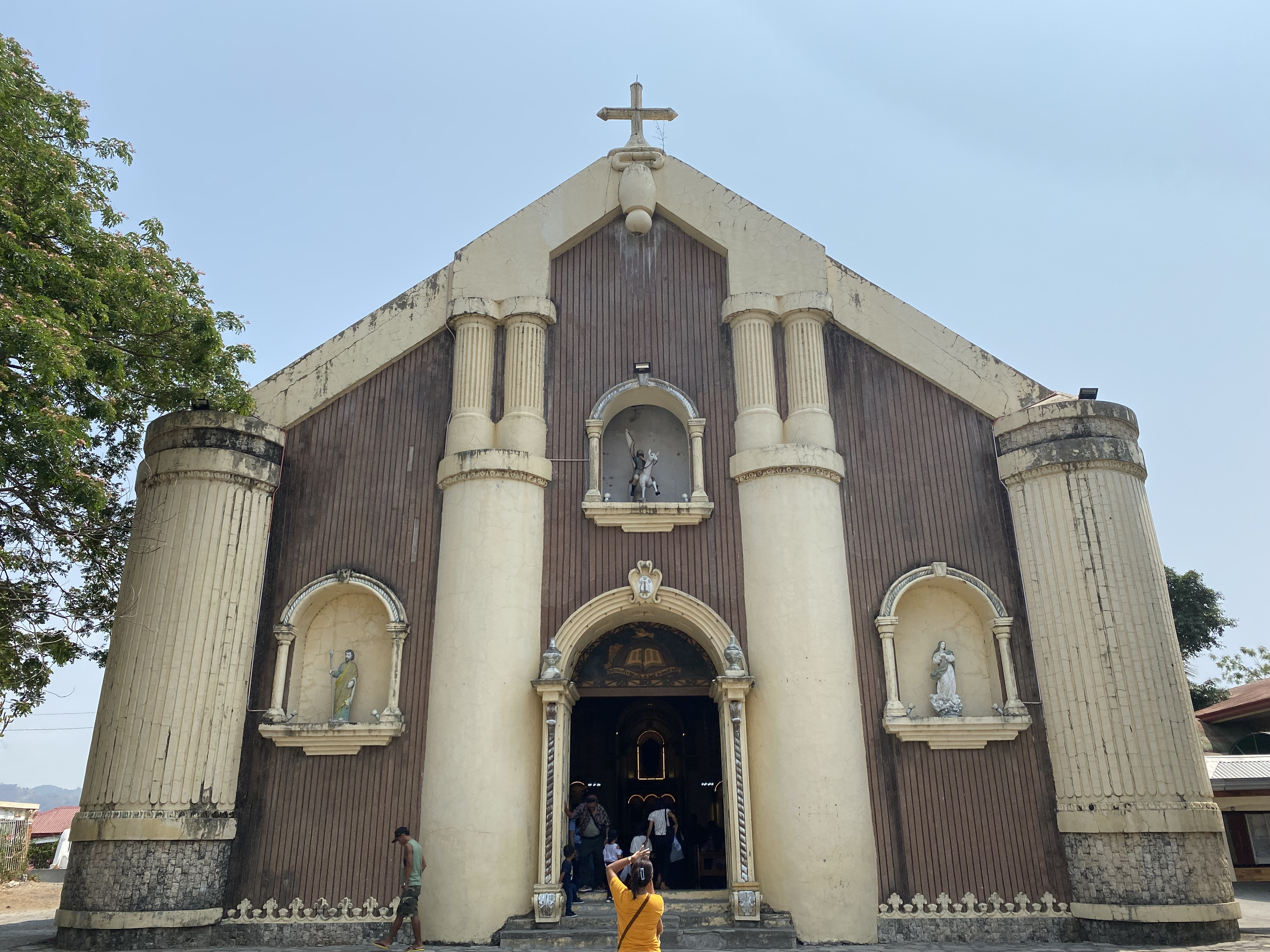
St. James the Greater Parish Church

Population census of Santiago

Year	Pop.	±% p.a.
1903	3,760	—
1918	5,429	+2.48%
1939	6,017	+0.49%
1948	6,610	+1.05%
1960	8,213	+1.83%
1970	10,224	+2.21%

Year	Pop.	±% p.a.
1975	11,245	+1.93%
1980	11,843	+1.04%
1990	14,427	+1.99%
1995	14,843	+0.53%
2000	15,876	+1.45%
2007	16,806	+0.79%

Year	Pop.	±% p.a.
2010	17,958	+2.44%
2015	18,759	+0.83%
2020	19,471	+0.79%
2024	19,771	+0.37%

Source: Philippine Statistics Authority

In the 2024 census, Santiago had a population of 19,771 people. The population density was 430 inhabitants per square kilometre (1,100/sq mi).

=== Language ===
The main language of Santiago is Ilocano.

== Economy ==
Poverty incidence of Santiago (%)

Source: Philippine Statistics Authority

Santiago is the headquarters of the Ilocos Sur Electric Cooperative (ISECO), which distributes electricity to the entire province.

== Government ==
=== Local government ===
Santiago, belonging to the second congressional district of the province of Ilocos Sur, is governed by a mayor designated as its local chief executive and by a municipal council as its legislative body in accordance with the Local Government Code. The mayor, vice mayor, and the councilors are elected directly by the people through an election which is being held every three years.

=== Elected officials ===
Members of the Municipal Council (2019–2022)
Position	Name
Congressman	Kristine Singson-Meehan
Mayor	Josefino E. Miranda
Vice-Mayor	Adrien Lawrence S. Miranda
Councilors	Joselito S. Miranda Jr.
Councilors	Lydia B. Locquiao
Councilors	Michael S. Miranda
Councilors	Warlito H. Gacoscos
Councilors	Virgilio C. Pasion
Councilors	Eddie G. Carranza
Councilors	Jonathan A. Trinidad
Councilors	Ernesto C. Galano

== Education ==
The Santiago Schools District Office governs all public and private education system within the municipality. The Schools District Office (SDO) oversees the operations of private and public elementary and high schools.

=== Primary and elementary schools ===
- Ambucao Elementary School
- Butol Elementary School
- Caburao Elementary School
- Dan-ar Community School
- Gabao Elementary School
- Olo-olo Elementary School
- Sabangan Elementary School
- Salincub Elementary School
- San Roque Elementary School
- Santiago North Central School
- Santiago South Central School

=== Secondary schools ===
- Santiago Catholic School
- Santiago Institute
- Santiago National High School

=== Higher educational institution ===
- Ilocos Sur Polytechnic State College

== Gallery ==
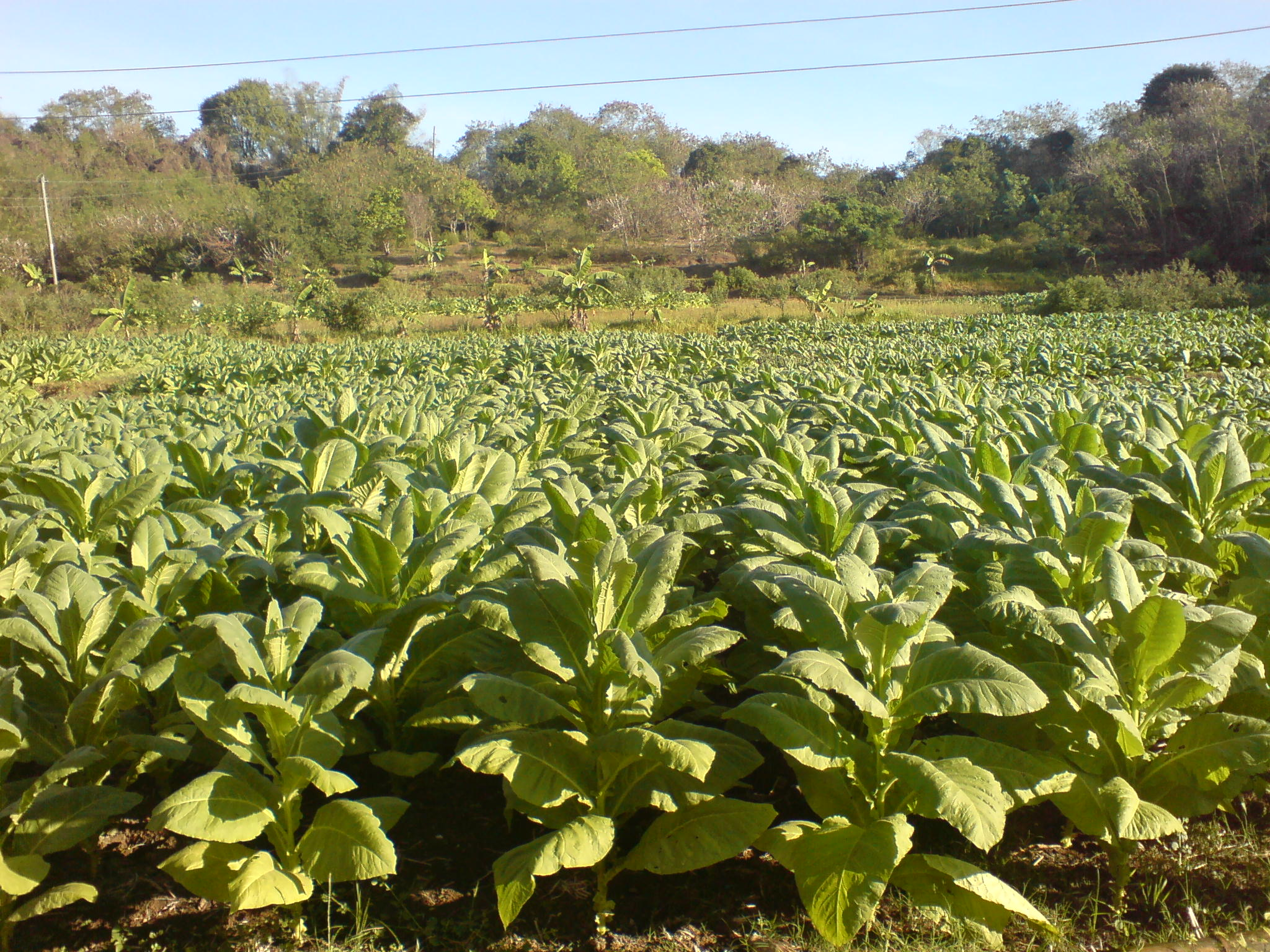
A field of tobacco growing in Baybayabas

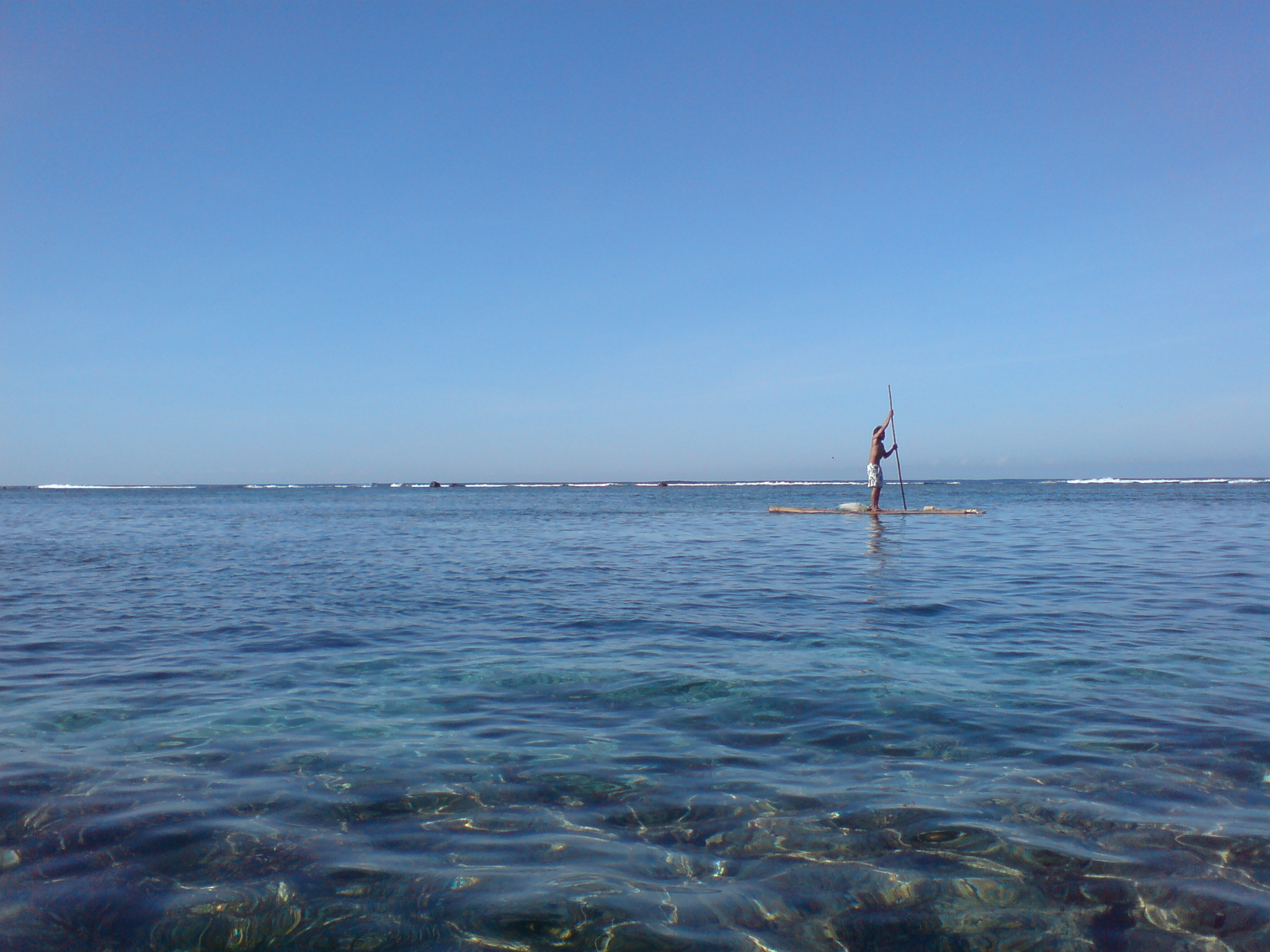
A man fishing just offshore near Gabao Beach.

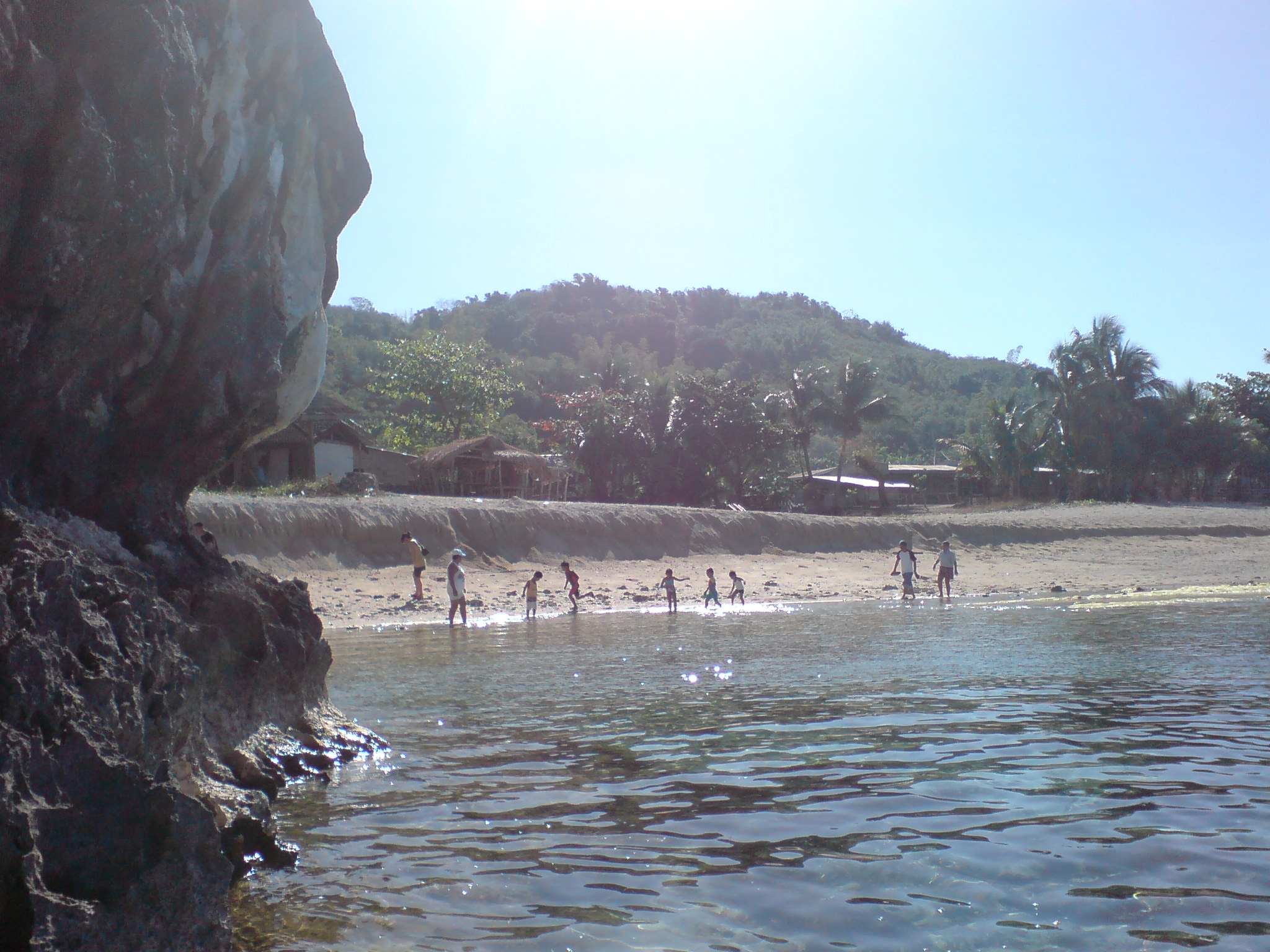
A beach in Ambucao
