= Santa Maria, Ilocos Sur =

Municipality in Ilocos Sur, Philippines

Santa Maria
- Municipality
- Municipality of Santa Maria
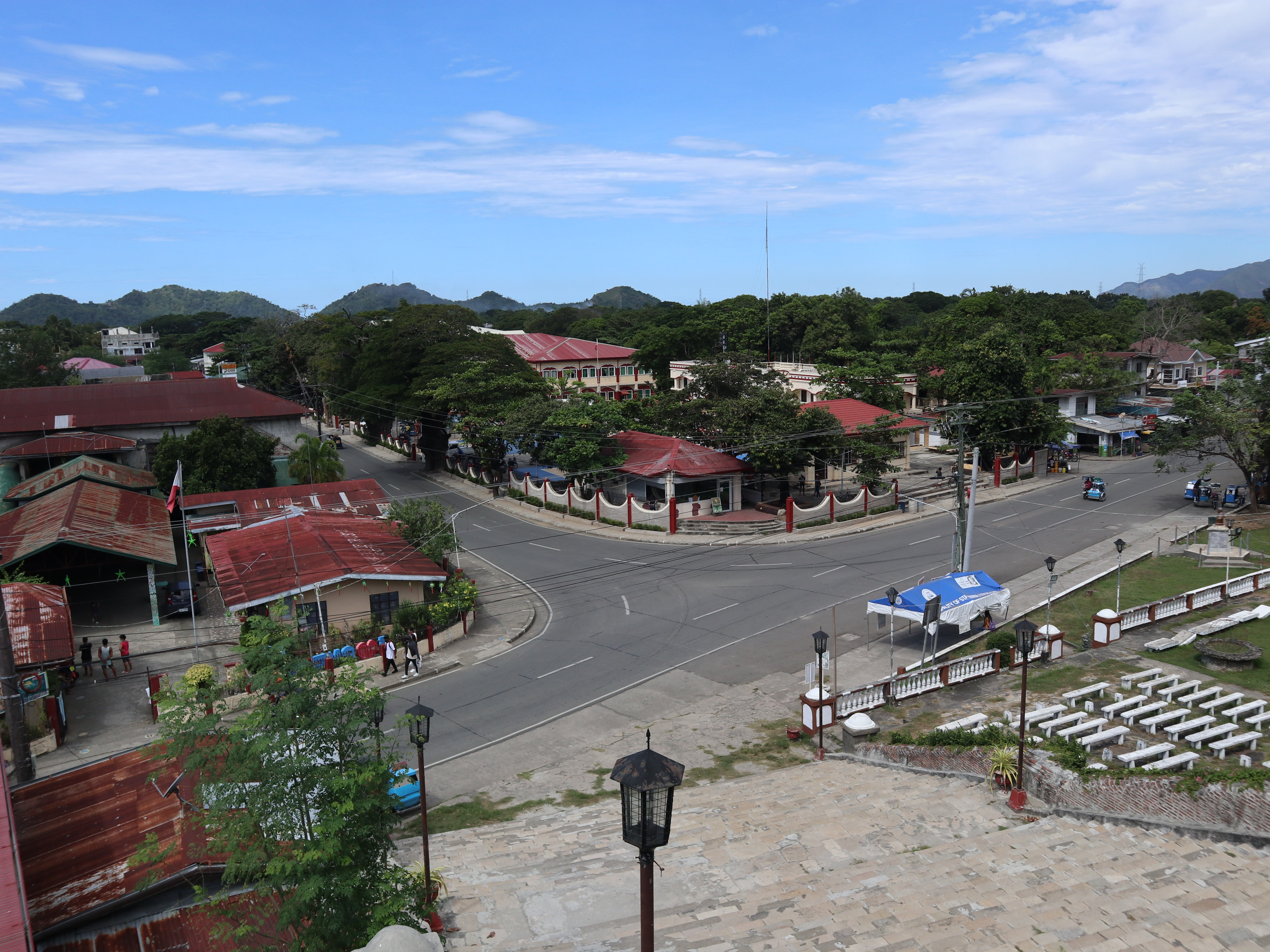
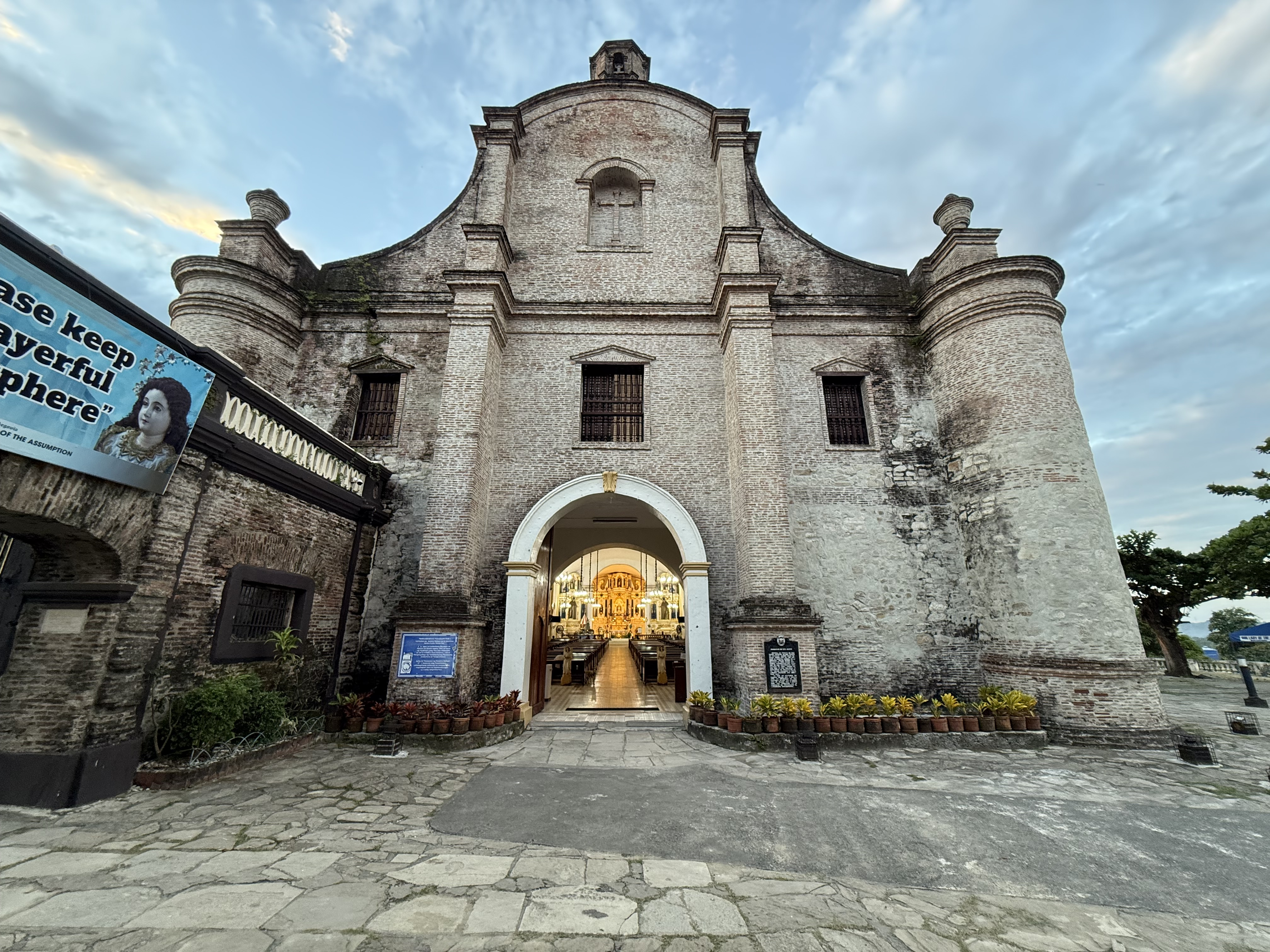
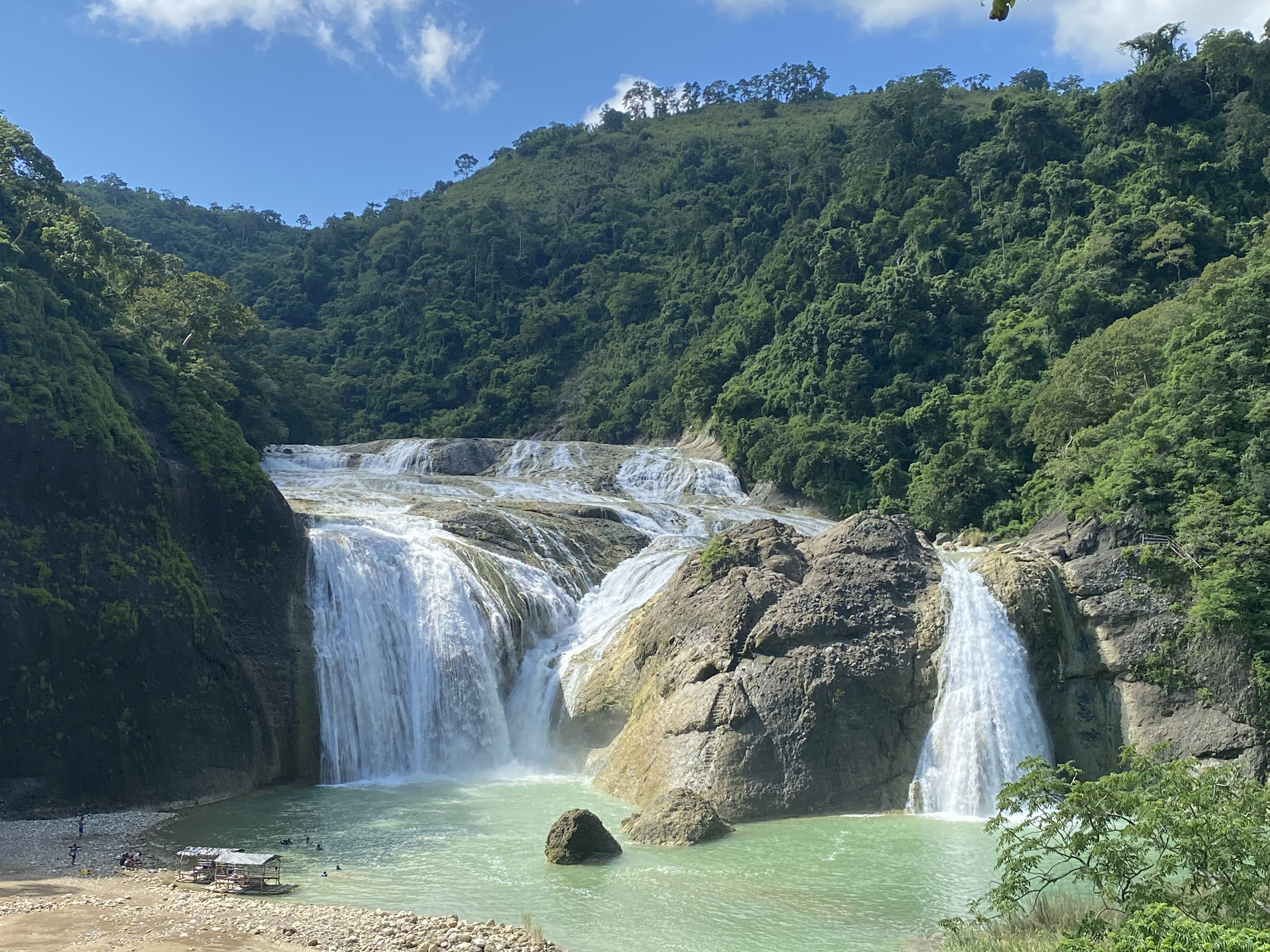
- Town Proper Minor Basilica of Our Lady of the Assumption Pinsal Falls

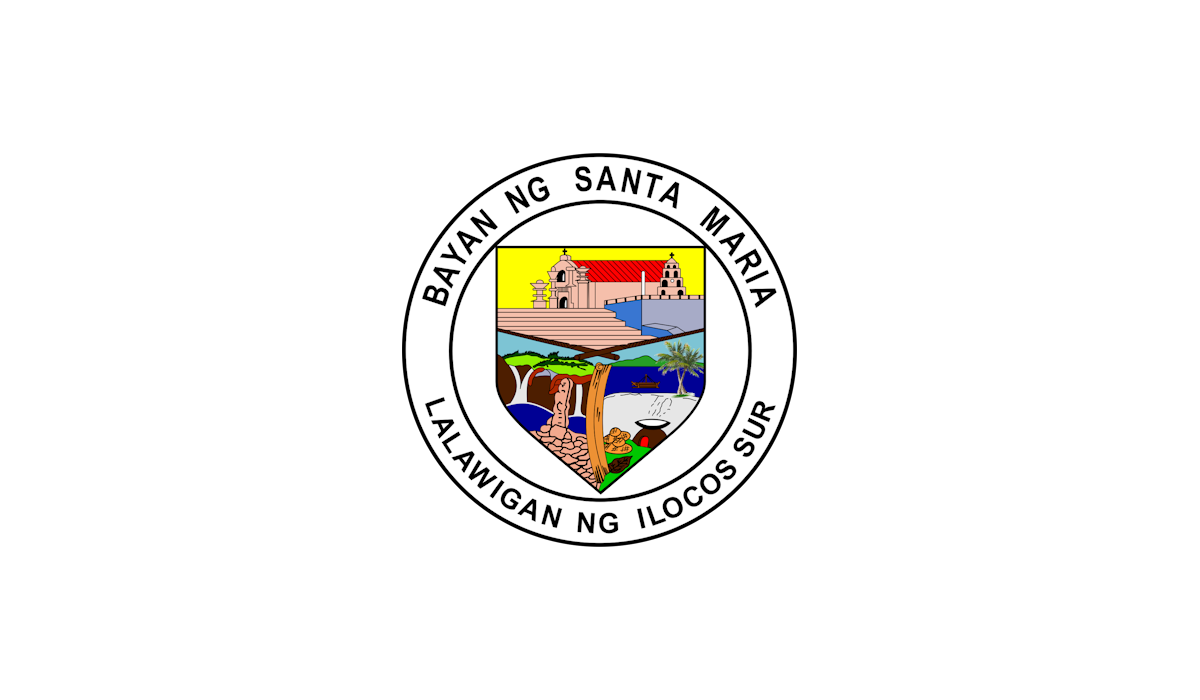
- Flag Seal

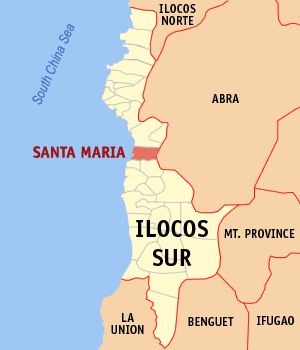
- Map of Ilocos Sur with Santa Maria highlighted
- Interactive map of Santa Maria
- Location within the Philippines
- Coordinates: 17°22′19″N 120°28′53″E
- Country: Philippines
- Region: Ilocos Region
- Province: Ilocos Sur
- District: 2nd district
- Founded: April 25, 1765
- Named for: Mary, mother of Jesus
- Barangays: 33 (see Barangays)

Government
  - Type: Sangguniang Bayan
  - Mayor: Michael S. Florendo
  - Vice Mayor: Rema Pazvia D. Cabatu
  - Representative: Kristine Singson-Meehan
  - Municipal Council: Members: Joel P. Dasargo; Iyra Joy D. Barroga Dosono; Dareen D. Guillermo; John John M. Reyes; Jose Marie A. Ancheta; Alfredo D. Bañes Jr.; Arlon S. Serdenia; Romeo D. Espirito
  - Electorate: 21,044 voters (2025)

Area
  - Total: 63.31 km^{2} (24.44 sq mi)
- Elevation: 20 m (66 ft)
- Highest elevation: 289 m (948 ft)
- Lowest elevation: 0 m (0 ft)

Population (2024 census)
  - Total: 30,076
  - Density: 475.1/km^{2} (1,230/sq mi)
  - Households: 7,453
- Demonym: Santa Marian’s

Economy
  - Income class: 1st municipal income class
  - Poverty incidence: 5.38% (2023)
  - Revenue: ₱ 663.2 million (2024)
  - Assets: ₱ 3,302 million (2024)
  - Expenditure: ₱ 235.6 million (2024)
  - Liabilities: ₱ 347 million (2024)

Service provider
  - Electricity: Ilocos Sur Electric Cooperative (ISECO)
- Time zone: UTC+8 (PST)
- ZIP code: 2705
- PSGC: 0102926000
- IDD : area code: +63 (0)77
- Native languages: Ilocano; Tagalog
- Major religions: Roman Catholic
- Feast date: August 15
- Catholic diocese: Archdiocese of Nueva Segovia
- Patron saint: Nuestra Señora de Asuncion
- Secondary Patroness: Sta. Barbara
- Website: www.santamariailocossur.gov.ph

Santa Maria, officially the Municipality of Santa Maria (Ilocano: Ili ti Santa Maria; Filipino: Bayan ng Santa Maria), is a municipality in the province of Ilocos Sur, Philippines. According to the 2024 census, it has a population of 30,076 people.

== History ==
The community of Santa Maria must have already been an organized settlement before the Spaniards came to the Philippines. When Captain Juan de Salcedo conquered the Ilocos in 1572, they found out that the people were already engaged in a robust trade and commercial relationship with the Japanese and the Chinese. The people's main industries were fishing, farming, and - to some extent - cotton weaving and pottery.

The people were noted for their religiosity. They worshiped the anitos, spirits, and local deities. Although the conquest of the Ilocos Region was a slow and painful process owing to the resistance mounted by the inhabitants, they were later conquered through the use of the sword and with the Cross. It was the religious nature of the people that the friars greatly leveraged to convert the Ilocanos to the new faith — Christianity.

In 1572, Juan De Salcedo established an encomienda in Vigan as more places fell under the control of the Spaniards. More parishes or visitas (sub-parishes) that could be easily serviced by the ecclesiastical and military officials were set up. When Narvacan was created as a definitory by the Augustinians on April 25, 1576, its visitas were Santa Maria, San Esteban, and Santiago. It is recorded that Narvacan was an encomienda of Don Nicolas de Figeroa in 1589; and left vacant in 1610. During this time, or a period later, Fr. Diego de Soria who later became bishop expanded the mission or religious control to the hinterlands - extending as far south as Pangasinan and east to the Cagayan Valley.

In the beginning, Santa Maria experienced hardships due to wars and other events. In 1638, the Chinese burned the town and ten years later in 1660–1661, during the Andres Malong Revolt, the Zambals ransacked and looted the settlement, and killed some of the inhabitants of the town. Much of the church properties were carried away by the rebels. In 1762, the forces of Diego Silang, the leader of the Ilocos Revolt of 1762–1763 during the British Occupation, controlled the town of Santa Maria until Silang was assassinated in Bantay by his close friend, a mestizo named Miguel Vicos, in 1763.

=== Establishment as an independent parish ===
There are conflicting dates regarding the establishment of this town as an independent parish or mission. The Catholic Directory of the Philippines as well as sources available at the Filipiniana Division of the National Library and National Archives show that the first Augustinian mission was established in Santa Maria in 1760. According to Reyes, Santa Maria was erected canonically in 1768; 1765 by Galende and Font; and 1769 by Buzeta, Bravo and Medina. It is likely that the town reverted to a visita of Narvacan for a period of time because of lacking a priest. In 1769, it was made again as an independent ministry under the patronage of the Blessed Virgin Mary of the Assumption in whose honor the name of the town was changed from Purok to Santa Maria. (The National Historical Commission of the Philippines placed the year as 1769, however, the people must have decided to have the foundation of Santa Maria as a separate in 1767 by basing their contention of the records that are still extent in Santa Maria. So that in 1967, the Santa Maria populace celebrated the 200th Anniversary of her Christianization.)

From then on, Santa Maria progressed. During the second half of the eighteenth century, vigorous and active missions or "expeditions" were launched by the missionaries toward the hinterlands from Santa Maria. The Pilar district in Abra was a place where commercial dealings with the natives took place. Occasionally, the people of Pilar went down to the town of Santa Maria to market and in most visitas, they were instructed into the faith, baptized or received the Holy Sacraments. (The Pilar district was a part of Ilocos Sur until the latter part of 1846, when it became part of Abra. It became a politico-military district later.) By 1800, the visitas of Santa Maria were San Esteban and Santiago. Fr. Bernardo Lago made it a religious center and converted thousands of its inhabitants to Christianity.

The following Augustinian missionaries are certain to have stayed in Santa Maria: Fr. Jose Laboza – 1769; Fr. Diego Sayar – 1773; Fr. Agustin Gomez- 1779; Fr. Manuel Silva- 1783–1785; (and who died there), Fr. Manuel Aparico – 1887; Fr. Exequiel Ortiz Lanzagorta – 1791 and who was secretary of the bishop of Nueva Segovia; and Fr. Alejandro Peyrona in 1786.

Santa Maria's progress can be discerned from the growth of her population. In 1793, it had 834 inhabitants and ranked fifteenth as one of the most densely populated towns in the Ilocos. By 1803, it had 7,893 people.

In 1813, a priest by the name Fr. Juan Cardaño built the irrigation system by digging a canal to divert the river to water the rice fields. During the construction of the irrigation system, the inhabitants felt embittered by the enforced labor. In 1817, the town of Santa Maria was fenced under the direction of Fr. Cardaño who finished the work through use of forced labor on the inhabitants. Then men were later sent to cut lumber for the shipbuilding industry.

Because of the rapid progress of the Ilocos, the region was divided into Ilocos Norte and Ilocos Sur provinces, pursuant to the Real Cedula as of February 2, 1818. The population of Santa Maria decreased in 1820 due to the cholera epidemic. Except for periods when cholera or other natural calamities affected Santa Maria, its progress took an upward trend. As a result of its progress, Nueva Coveta, now Burgos, was separated from Santa Maria and established in 1831.

In 1850, Buzeta and Bravo describes the town of Santa Maria as follows:

In 1850, the town had some 1,983 houses constructed like most Philippine houses, some made of wood, most of bamboo and cogon grass. The more notable edifices were the tribunal, tile roofed and made of stone, on whose ground floor is the prison. This building is located in the plaza near the market place, where vegetables, eggs, meat and fish are sold. Sometimes itinerant mestizos sold merchandise there.

In front of the tribunal stood three private houses, also tile-roofed and made of stones, as well as two others, of the same material about to be finished. The town has a primary school maintained by the coffers of the town. Moreover, there are private schools for boys and girls.

The Church and tower are made of stone, and the sacristy, of stone and bricks. Near the house, atop a hill, is the convent of the parish house, which is equally imposing building. Down below, and 200 meters away, is the cemetery with its well-ventilated chapel, but which was destroyed by earthquake not long ago.

In Santa Maria, mail is received from the North (from Narvacan) every Tuesday morning and those from Manila, through Santiago every Thursday noon. The town consists of the barrios of Patac (Pacak), in the south, and those of San Gelacio, San Gregorio, and San Francisco which are close to the church (bajo de campana); farther away Tanggapan, Silas, Minorio, Bitalag, Gusing, Subsubosob, Dingtan, and Cabaritan, separated by wide fields but each of these barrios have only a few huts where the natives stay during harvest time.

The town has two ports: one in the west capable of handling big ships, the other in the north, which only handle smaller boats because of its narrow entrance but it can be widened to accommodate bigger ships as it did sometime in the past, when two full-rigged boats were constructed there.

The land is quite fertile, most of which is irrigated; thanks to the zeal of Fr. Juan Cardaño, present (1850) parish priest who, with the help of the colonial government was able to realize any improvements of the town, including the construction of the irrigation system, after six years of work. In 1804, when Cardaño took over the parish, the harvest were always in the danger of being lost due to the lack of irrigation, thus only 994 tributes (were paid); now 1850, 2,595 do so.

Their most important products are rice, wheat, cane and corn. Corn is abundant that it is exported to Santa, Bantay, Santa Catalina, San Vicente and many others. Oranges, santol and many kinds of bananas, pineapple, cacao are also grown in abundance.

In the mountains nearby, are different kinds of wood, like narra, molave, banaba, panurapin, bulala and others. Also found there, are chickens, deer and various varieties of birds. There is a gold mine in Pinsal, which is still to be exploited.

The inhabitants engaged in agriculture, lumbering and the women in weaving cotton cloth; some of which are sold in other places.

By this time in 1850, Santa Maria had a population of 11,900, up from 10,908 in 1845. By 1865, it was 12,059 and by 1880, 15,152 souls. There was a drought in 1878 followed by devastation of the fields by locusts and insects; and famine set in.

In 1881, embittered at the Spanish authorities due to the harsh treatment given them, the people stoned the tribunal and almost rose in arms against the Spaniards. During the great renovation of the convent in 1895, many of the inhabitants migrated to Cuyapo, Nueva Ecija to escape the forced labor and established a new community. Furthermore, the epidemics of cholera in 1881, 1883, and 1889 reduced greatly her population to 11,426 by 1892.

=== From the Philippine revolution and thereafter ===
During the Philippine revolution, Julian Directo became its first elected president in September 1898. The members of the Philippine Independent Church (PIC) took over the churches in Ilocos. It was an offshoot from the abuses of the friars and the effect of the revolution. The outbreak of the revolution further attributed to the decline of Santa Maria's inhabitants to 10,030 by 1901.

Since the transfer of the Philippine sovereignty to the Americans in December 1898, many of the foreigners who traveled to the north and saw the Church of Santa Maria were much impressed and called the church as a Cathedral. Henry Savage Landor, an English painter, writer and explorer who visited the Philippines in 1900, says:

At Santa Maria a most picturesque church is to be found, reached on an imposing flight of steps. An enormous convent stands beside the church, upon a terrace some 80 feet above the plaza. There are a number of brick buildings, schoolhouses and office, which must have been very handsome but are tumbling down, the streets being in the absolute possession of sheep, goats and hogs. A great expanse of level land was now well-cultivated into paddy fields and across it is a road fifteen feet wide, well-metalled and with a sandy surface. Barrios and homes were scattered all around the plain.

When civil government was restored in Ilocos Sur under the American rule in 1901, Sinfroso Tamayo became its first president. According to some records, William Cameron Forbes, a member of the Taft Commission visited Santa Maria in 1901. A report in 1902 describes Santa Maria as town along the coast of Ilocos Sur, Luzon, (with) several cart roads that led to the interior; a city that built and by way of historical note, adds that on December 3, 1900, 2,150 insurgents surrendered here, (and) took oath of allegiance to the United States.

The Church of Santa Maria and other churches held by the PIC priests were returned to the administration of the Roman Catholic Church by the enactment of the Philippine Commission Act No. 1376 on July 24, 1905. (In spite of this major decision, the members of the Philippine Independent Church still hold their own in the Ilocos Region today.)

In 1902, another epidemic of cholera occurred followed by typhoid in 1909. Floods and typhoons added to the sufferings of the people in 1911 and 1913. These calamities greatly reduced the population and hindered the progress of Santa Maria. Many of the people after this period migrated to the central plains of Luzon, Mindanao and to as far as Hawaii and California in the United States of America.

The conditions in Santa Maria greatly changed fifty years later. The American Occupation had some beneficial effects as then roads, schools and better ways of farming were introduced in Santa Maria. A new generation became prominent who became new leaders in the present town of Santa Maria. In 1932, President Manuel Quezon visited Santa Maria on the occasion of his tour of Northern Luzon before the Commonwealth. After World War II, new buildings were built and churches were erected by the different religious as well as commercial and tourist spots developed.

== Geography ==
The Municipality of Santa Maria is situated at the western coastline of the island of Luzon, the munipality is nestled in a valley surrounded by mountains. The town lies in the central part of the province of Ilocos Sur. It is bordered by the municipality of Narvacan to the north, Pilar, Abra to the east and San Esteban and Burgos, Ilocos Sur to the south

Santa Maria is situated 37.34 kilometres (23.20 mi) from the provincial capital Vigan, and 367.03 kilometres (228.06 mi) from the country's capital city of Manila.

=== Barangays ===
Santa Maria is politically subdivided into 33 barangays. Each barangay consists of puroks and some have sitios.

- Ag-agrao
- Ampuagan
- Baballasioan
- Baliw Daya (San Gelacio)
- Baliw Laud (Simbuok)
- Bia-o
- Butir
- Cabaroan
- Danuman East
- Danuman West
- Dunglayan
- Gusing
- Langaoan
- Laslasong Norte
- Laslasong Sur
- Laslasong West
- Lesseb
- Lingsat
- Lubong
- Maynganay Norte
- Maynganay Sur (San Ignacio)
- Nagsayaoan
- Nagtupacan
- Nalvo
- Pacang
- Penned
- Poblacion Norte (San Gregorio)
- Poblacion Sur (San Francisco)
- Silag
- Sumagui
- Suso
- Tangaoan
- Tinaan

=== Climate ===
Climate data for Santa Maria, Ilocos Sur
Month	Jan	Feb	Mar	Apr	May	Jun	Jul	Aug	Sep	Oct	Nov	Dec	Year
Mean daily maximum °C (°F)	30 (86)	31 (88)	33 (91)	34 (93)	33 (91)	31 (88)	30 (86)	30 (86)	30 (86)	31 (88)	31 (88)	30 (86)	31 (88)
Mean daily minimum °C (°F)	19 (66)	19 (66)	21 (70)	23 (73)	25 (77)	25 (77)	25 (77)	24 (75)	24 (75)	22 (72)	21 (70)	20 (68)	22 (72)
Average precipitation mm (inches)	10 (0.4)	10 (0.4)	14 (0.6)	23 (0.9)	80 (3.1)	103 (4.1)	121 (4.8)	111 (4.4)	119 (4.7)	144 (5.7)	39 (1.5)	15 (0.6)	789 (31.2)
Average rainy days	5.2	3.9	6.2	9.1	18.5	21.4	22.9	19.8	19.8	16.2	10.5	6.1	159.6
Source: Meteoblue (modeled/calculated data, not measured locally)

== Demographics ==
Population census of Santa Maria

Year	Pop.	±% p.a.
1903	10,082	—
1918	11,743	+1.02%
1939	13,103	+0.52%
1948	13,637	+0.44%
1960	16,313	+1.50%
1970	18,819	+1.44%

Year	Pop.	±% p.a.
1975	19,857	+1.08%
1980	21,308	+1.42%
1990	23,821	+1.12%
1995	24,580	+0.59%
2000	26,396	+1.54%
2007	28,002	+0.82%

Year	Pop.	±% p.a.
2010	28,597	+0.77%
2015	30,321	+1.12%
2020	30,006	−0.22%
2024	30,076	+0.06%

Source: Philippine Statistics Authority

In the 2024 census, Santa Maria had a population of 30,076 people. The population density was 480 inhabitants per square kilometre (1,200/sq mi).

== Economy ==
Poverty incidence of Santa Maria (%)

Source: Philippine Statistics Authority

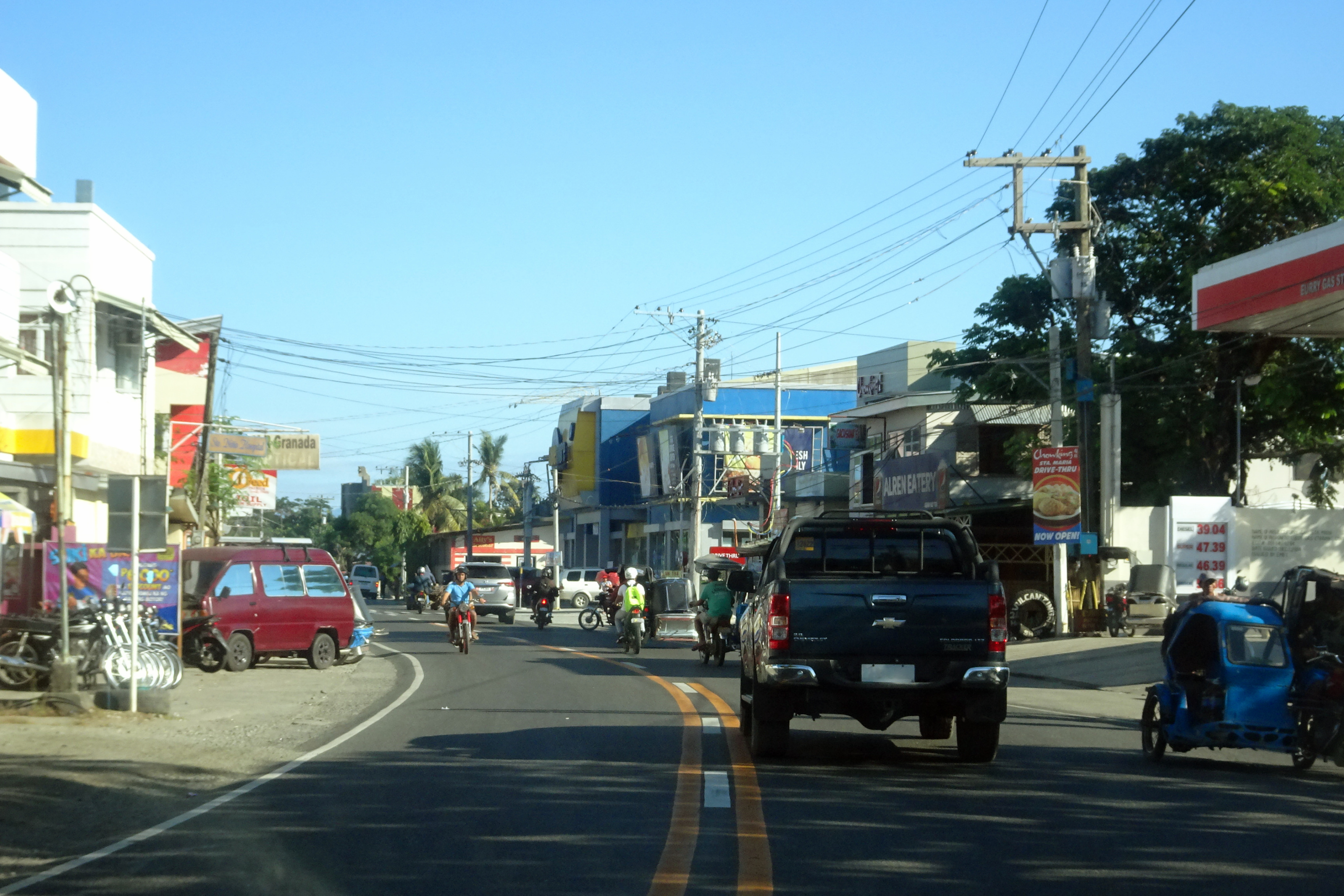
Main highway through Santa Maria

Located in a fertile region with a cool tropical climate, the principal crops of Santa Maria are corn, cotton, indigo, rice, sugarcane and tobacco.

Santa Maria's economy remained docile for almost four decades, subsisting only with fair performance in the aquaculture and agricultural ventures with no new developments in-place to create job opportunities in the commercial sector. Tourism industry's growth remains to be seen in the long-term. Industries relative interests to the town has to be developed and the corresponding infrastructure must be funded and implemented accordingly to create and sustain future development.

Santa Maria is the Home of the First SM SaveMore Market in Ilocos Sur located in Barangay Maynganay Sur in front of the Santa Maria New Public Market.

== Culture ==
Name of Event	Date
Santa Maria Inter-Barangay Basketball Tournament	March to April
Santa Maria Town Fiesta - Balikutsa Festival	April 24–30
Feast Day of Nuestra Senora de la Asuncion	August 15
Santa Maria Children's Christmas Festival	December 28

== National Cultural Treasures (2) ==
The town of Santa Maria boasts a rich history and notable landmarks, including two heritage structures built during the Spanish era using bricks and limestone that have been declared National Cultural Treasures by the National Museum of the Philippines, ensuring their preservation and protection for future generations with other structures pending declaration.

National Cultural Treasures declared by the National Museum of the Philippines	Date of the Marker	Remarks
Santa Maria Church and Cemetery Complex	December 2015	The National Cultural Treasure (NCT) marker for the Santa Maria Church and Cemetery Complex has yet to be installed. Currently, it remains stored at the parish office and has not received the attention it deserves. Its installation is still pending, and no formal action has been taken to place it at its proper location, even though it was issued to the Parish of Sta. Maria since 2016. Main article: List of National Cultural Treasures in the Philippines
Santa Maria Spanish Era Bridge	December 2015	The Historical Marker of the Spanish-Era Bridge of Sta. Maria was unveiled on September 23, 2024, emphasizing the more than two-hundred-year-old structure’s importance in heritage conservation. The formal installation ceremony was attended by representatives from the Department of Tourism and the National Museum of the Philippines–Ilocos Region. The event reaffirmed the bridge’s historical value and its designation as a protected cultural asset. Main article: List of National Cultural Treasures in the Philippines
Santa Maria Twin Chapel Complex (for review and evaluation)	on process / cultural mapped site	The Santa Maria Twin Chapels, with their rich historical and cultural significance, are awaiting declaration as National Cultural Treasures by the National Museum of the Philippines. This recognition will ensure their protection and preservation for future generations.
Gabaldon Buildings (Sta. Maria West Central School, ISPSC Sta. Maria & Suso Elementary School (now in ruins)	RA 11194 of 2019	Republic Act No. 11194, a Philippine National Law officially titled the “Gabaldon School Buildings Conservation Act.” It was approved into law on January 18, 2019 and aims to protect, conserve, and restore Gabaldon school buildings across the country.

== Tourism ==
The town is home to the Our Lady of the Assumption Church (Nuestra Señora de la Asuncion), a UNESCO World Heritage Site. The townspeople celebrate their patronal festival in honor of the Virgin Mary as Our Lady of the Assumption (more commonly known as Apo Baket) every August 15 and lasting for several days.

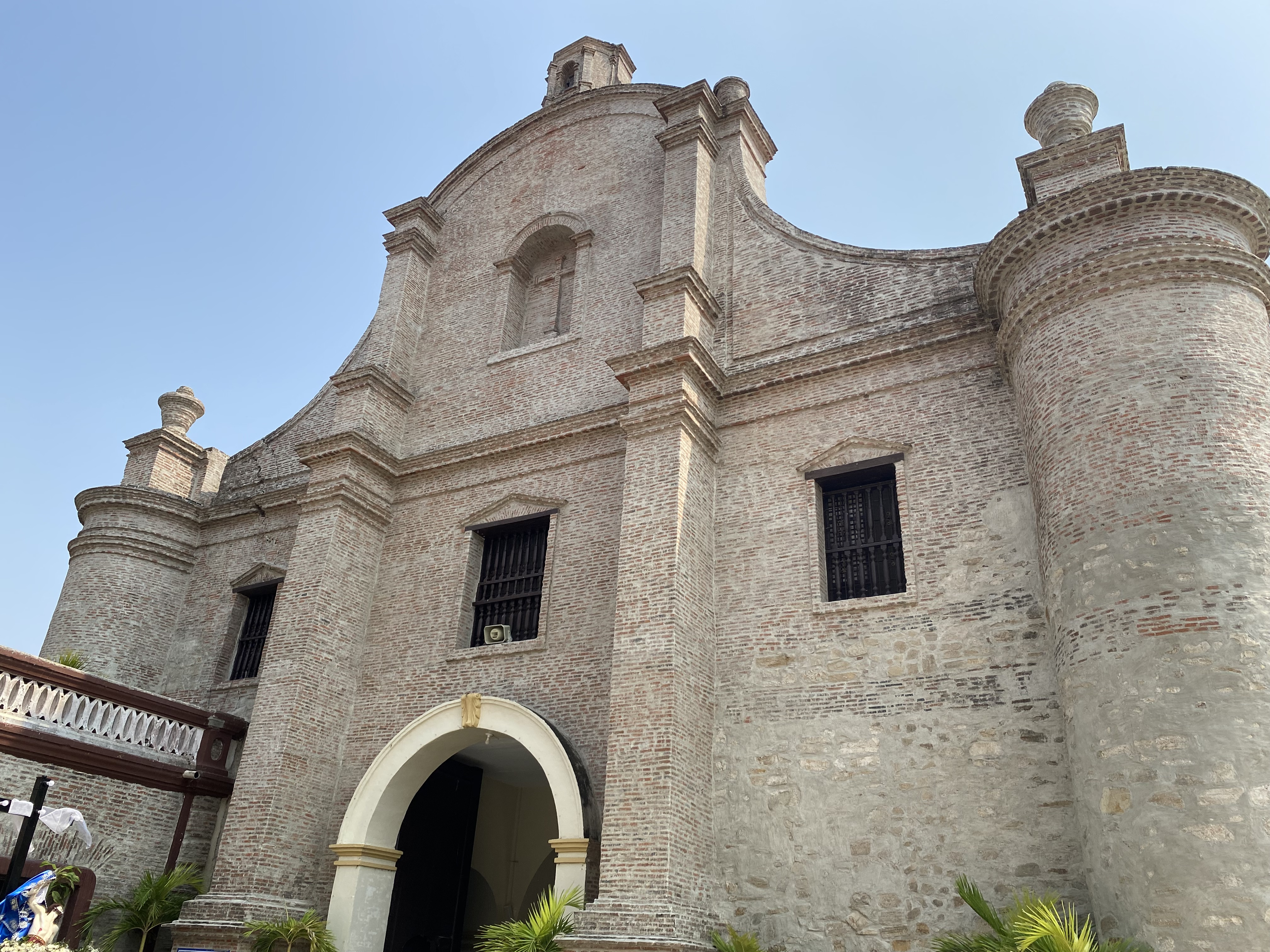
Façade of the Nuestra Señora de la Asuncion Church

=== Minor Basilica of Our Lady of the Assumption ===
The Minor Basilica of Our Lady of the Assumption (Nuestra Señora de la Asuncion) (also known as the Santa Maria Church) in Santa Maria is a designated a UNESCO World Heritage Site in 1993 as part of the Baroque Churches of the Philippines collection of four Spanish-era churches.

=== Santa Maria Twin Chapel and Ruins ===
The compound of Santa Maria East Central School houses the Santa Maria Twin Chapels, the site of the First established parish of Santa Maria, wherein the northern chapel was dedicated to Señor Santo Kristo and the southern chapel was dedicated to Nuestra Señora dela Asuncion. But only the southern chapel stands nowadays, the northern chapel was damaged. The Provincial Government of Ilocos Sur is having the plan to restore / rebuilt the damaged chapel.

=== Santa Maria Spanish Era Cemetery ===
The cemetery is located 200 meters east of the Santa Maria Church declared as UNESCO World Heritage Site, National Historical Landmark by the National Historical Commission of the Philippines and lately National Cultural Treasure by the National Museum of the Philippines in which this cemetery was included as part of the declaration "Santa Maria Church & Complex". The square shaped cemetery today undergoes in a restoration the whole cemetery site (the brick perimeter fence, the ruins of the chapel and other structures found inside the compound) to preserve its original beauty for the next generation. The restoration is expected to be finished this December 2019 and to be turned over to the Archdiocese of Nueva Segovia, Parish of Our Lady of the Assumption, and to the Local Government Unit of Sta. Maria, Ilocos Sur. After the restoration is said that the site will be declared as another tourist site additional attraction to be visited when visiting the Santa Maria Church.

=== Santa Maria Spanish Era Bridges ===
Built during the 19th century, one of the few remaining bridges built by the Spanish Colonial Authorities, the bridge in the town of Santa Maria is made entirely of bricks. Proof of its durability and strength, the bridge still withstands the weight of passing busses and trucks. This Old Spanish Bridge is located in between Poblacion Norte and Baliw Daya. Another old Spanish Bridge can also be found on the road going to Barangay Cabaroan. It is not noticeable when you pass by the road unless you go down to the fields. This bridge is still utilize not only as a bridge but also for irrigation system.

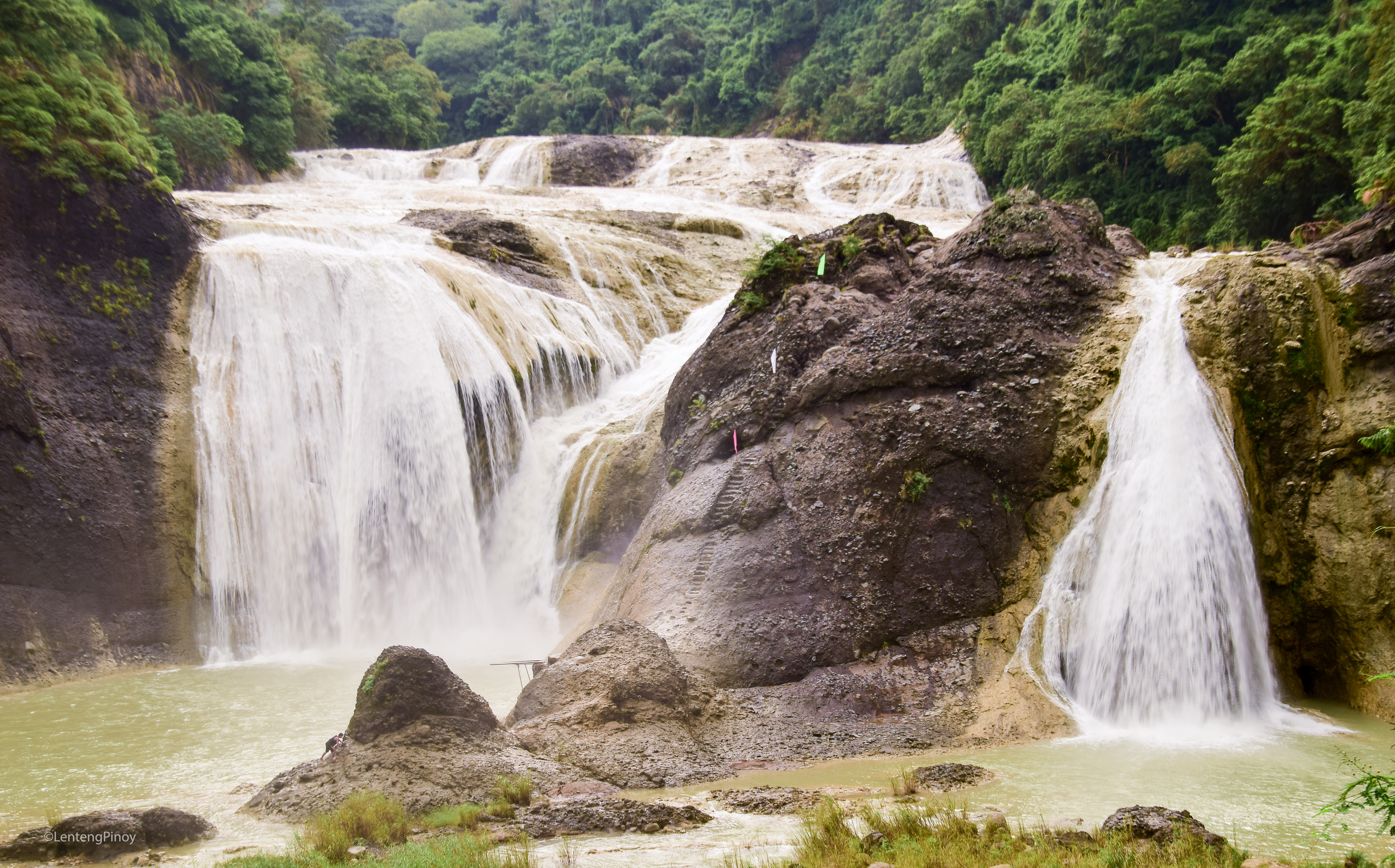
Pinsal Twin Falls

=== Pinsal Falls ===
Pinsal Falls, considered as the largest and grandest waterfalls in Ilocos Region, are located in a narrow gorge in Barangay Baballasioan of Santa Maria. Pinsal is a group of plunge and cascades waterfalls falling from a 300-ft wide irregular shaped river ledge the highest of which is a drop of about 85 feet (26 m). Upriver are several smaller falls with their own natural pools. Behind the cascading water of the main falls is a hidden cave where one can swim from. Another tall waterfall is located at the southern ledge.

On August 22, 2019, President Rodrigo Duterte signed Republic Act No. 11409 that declared the falls as a tourist destination.

=== Botigue Falls ===
Botigue Falls, situated in the forest of Sitio Paring, Barangay Baballasioan, is noted for its turquoise-colored waters that cascade over natural rock formations making it a significant site for ecotourism. Botigue Falls can be accessed via the Municipality of Pilar, Abra, and Nagbukel, Ilocos Sur, and is characterized by its natural scenery and forested trails.

=== Nagbekkelan Falls ===
Nagbekkelan Falls, located in Barangay Silag, is situated within the barangay’s forest and serves both as a recreational site and a source of irrigation for surrounding agricultural fields. Its waters highlight the connection between natural resources and local livelihoods in the area.

=== Santa Maria Lighthouse ===
A lighthouse on a side of a hill in Barangay Nalvo near the Super Beach Road. This lighthouse is visible when passing on the National Highway in Barangay Suso. This lighthouse is inactive and needs for repairs by the Philippine Coast Guard.

=== Mt. Caliag (Bantay Calbo) Mountain Hiking ===
Highest peak and on this spot one can see the 180 degree view of the town of Santa Maria located in Barangay Pacang through hiking.

=== The Hill of Suso Beach ===
One day, Angalo and his wife Aran were at the what is today called Suso Beach in Santa Maria, Ilocos Sur. While on the beach, Angalo piled up stones, shrubs, and sand to form a hill. When asked about his creation, he told his wife that he made the hill to resemble and honor her breasts. To this day. the hill on the southern side of Suso beach is said to be that hill.

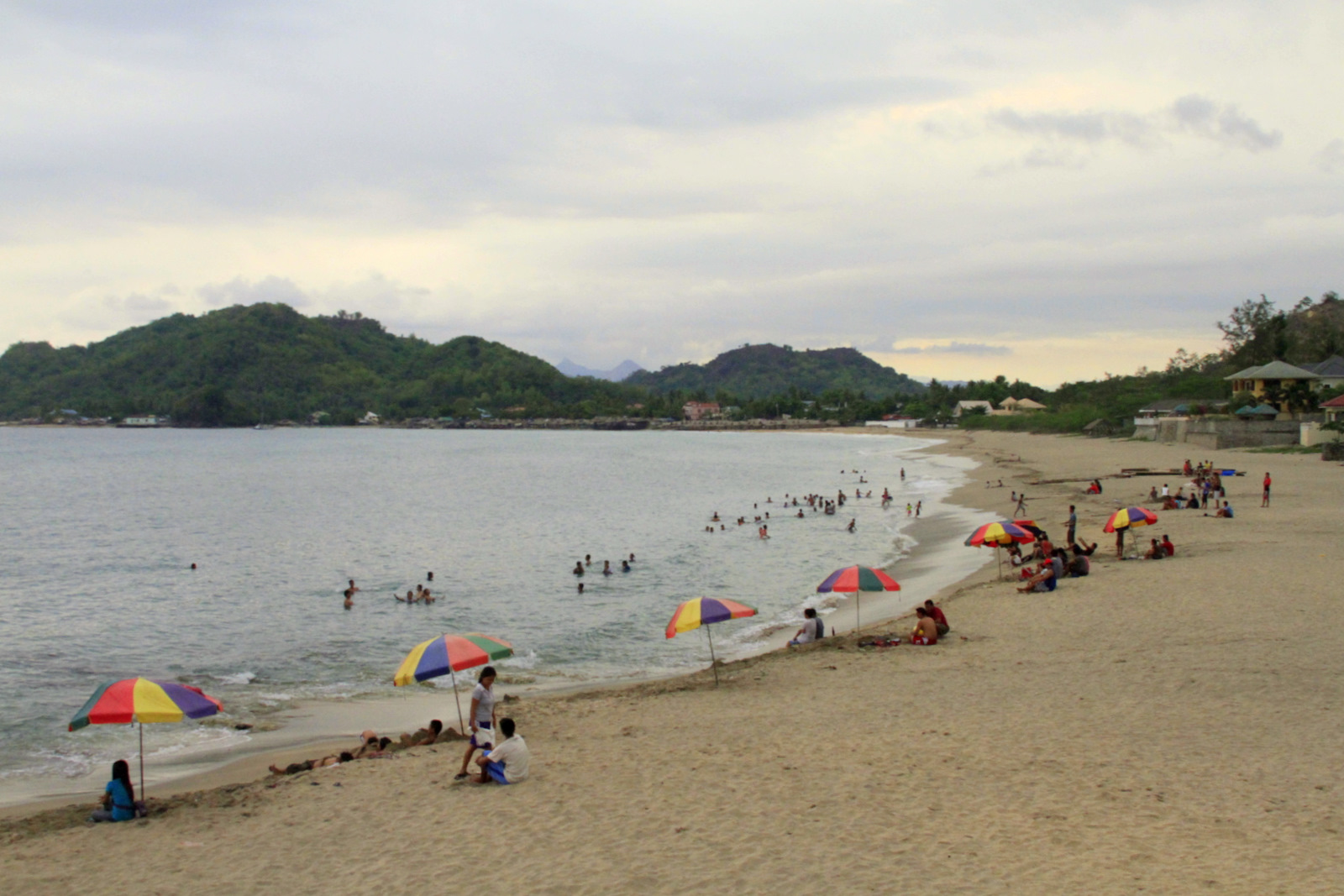
Suso Beach

=== Santa Maria Beach ===
Composed of beaches along Barangay Suso, Nalvo, Lingsat, and Bia-o. These places are known for picnic and swimming sites for tourists and vacationists. A road connecting these into one super beach is being planned on ground.

=== Santa Maria Diving Spot - Suso Reef ===
One of the six dive spots being developed and promoted as an Eco-Tourism project by the Provincial Government of Ilocos Sur through the leadership of Gov. Ryan Singson. This project aims to help grow tourism in the province, provide alternative livelihood to the coastal communities and reduce fishing pressures on these beautiful marine resources.

=== Santa Maria Super Beach Road ===
Newly constructed Road connecting Barangay Nalvo and Lingsat.

=== Lourdes Grotto and Gazebo ===
Located at the foot of the Santa Maria Church. It is the exact replica of the Lourdes Grotto of Lourdes, France.

=== Penned Irrigation Dam ===
Water from the Pinsal Falls passes through this dam which of the locals uses it as an irrigation and swimming area. This is located in Barangay Penned.

=== Balikutsa Making ===
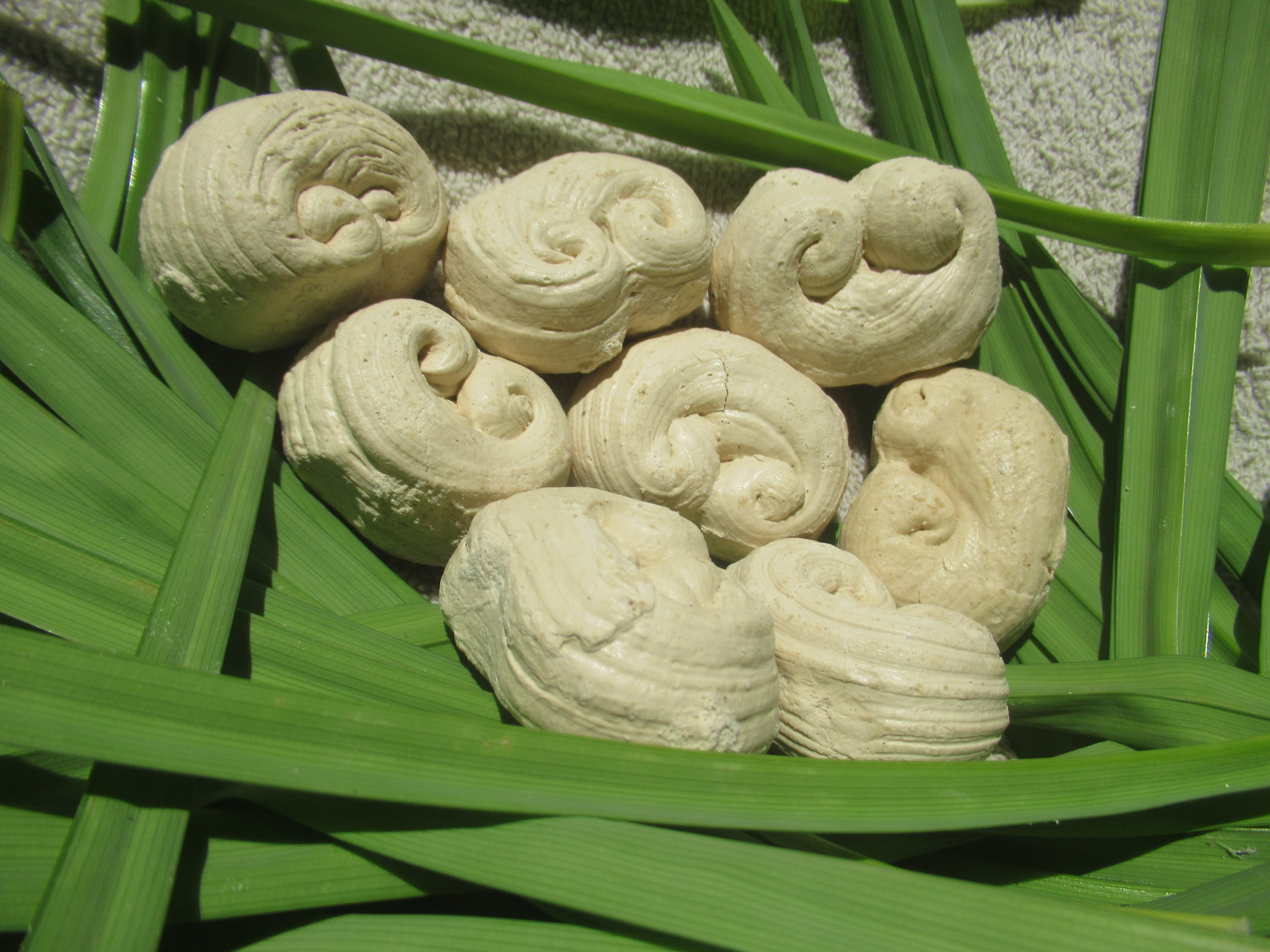
Balikucha, Ilocos Sur

Considered the main product of the municipality, balikutsa reflects the town’s rich agricultural heritage rooted in sugarcane farming. Some sugarcane growers offer on-the-spot demonstrations where visitors can witness and participate in the panagbennat, the traditional process of cooking freshly extracted sugarcane juice into cooled molasses. Aside from balikutsa, sugarcane locally called unas, is also processed into sugarcane vinegar, locally known as suka ti Ilocos, as well as basi, a traditional local wine. These products are among the valued agricultural goods of the town and highlight the cultural significance of sugarcane in Santa Maria.

== Government ==
=== Local government ===
Santa Maria, belonging to the second congressional district of the province of Ilocos Sur, is governed by a mayor designated as its local chief executive and by a municipal council as its legislative body in accordance with the Local Government Code. The mayor, vice mayor, and the councilors are elected directly by the people through an election which is being held every three years.

=== Elected officials ===
Members of the Municipal Council (2025–2028)
Position	Name
Congressman	Kristine Singson-Meehan
Mayor	Michael S. Florendo
Vice-Mayor	Rema Pazvia D. Cabatu
Councilors	Joel P. Dasargo
Councilors	Iyra Joy Barroga Dosono
Councilors	Dareen D. Guillermo
Councilors	John John M. Reyes
Councilors	Jose Marie A. Ancheta
Councilors	Alfredo D. Bañes Jr.
Councilors	Arlon S. Serdenia
Councilors	Romeo D. Espiritu

== Education ==
The Sta. Maria Schools District Office governs all educational institutions within the municipality. It oversees the operations of private and public elementary and high schools. Santa Maria District placed under the Department of Education Ilocos Sur Schools Division.

=== Elementary Schools ===
Santa Maria District has 20 elementary schools and 2 preparatory schools: 3 private and 19 public elementary schools:

- Ag-agrao Elementary School
- Ampuagan Elementary School
- Baballasioan Elementary School
- Bia-o Elementary School
- Butir Elementary School
- Cabaroan Elementary School
- Danuman Elementary School
- Dunglayan Elementary School
- Gusing Elementary School
- Laslasong Elementary School
- Maynganay Elementary School
- Nagsayaoan Elementary School
- Nalvo Elementary School
- Santa Maria East Central School
- Santa Maria West Centra School
- Silag - Pacang Integrated School
- St. Mary's College - Elementary Department
- Suso Elementary School
- Tangaoan Elementary School
- Tinaan Elementary School
- Little Lambs Kiddie School -UMC
- Little Vessel of God Preparatory School - Born Again Christian

=== Secondary schools ===
Santa Maria has five (5) secondary schools: 1 private, 1 integrated school, 2 national high schools and 1 laboratory high school:

- Ag-agrao National High School
- ISPSC - Laboratory High School
- Santa Maria National High School
- Silag-Pacang Integrated School
- St. Mary's College - High School Department

=== Higher educational institutions ===
- Ilocos Sur Polytechnic State College
- St. Mary's College of Santa Maria, Ilocos Sur, Inc. - Private Institution at Santa Maria that offers education courses.
- University of Northern Philippines - Branch of the University of Northern Philippines at Barangay Nalvo that houses the Marine Research and Development Center.

== Healthcare ==
- Judge Celestino Guerrero Memorial Hospital - Poblacion Sur
- Reyes Hospital - Poblacion Sur
- Santo Niño Hospital - Baliw Laud
- Santa Maria Rural Health Unit - Poblacion Sur

== Notable personalities ==
- William Dar - Former Director General of ICRISAT and Secretary of Agriculture of the Philippines.
- Captivating Katkat - Drag Performer, Winner of Drag Race Philippines (Season 2)
