= Balikucha =

Filipino pulled candy

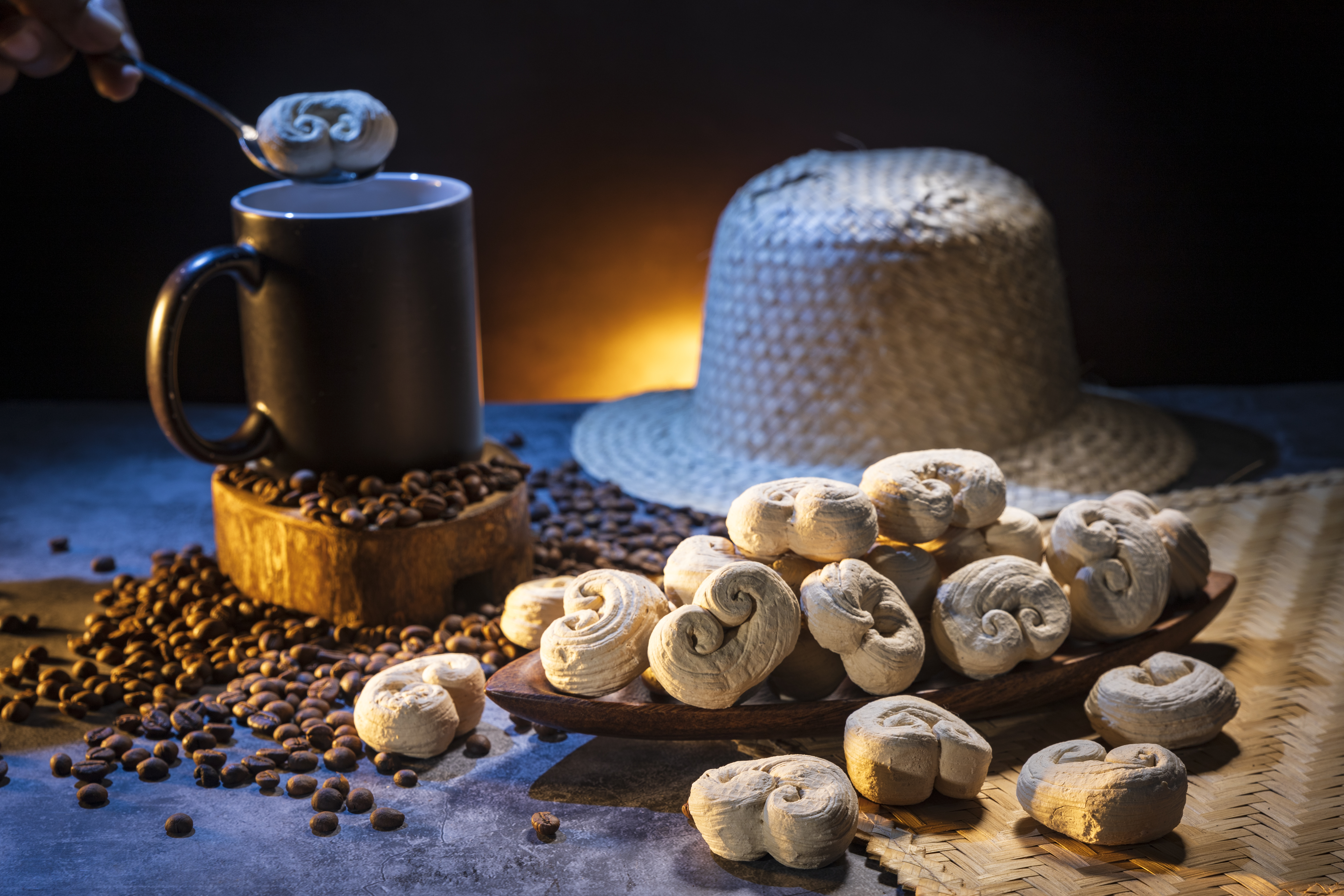
- Balicucha a candy made from sugarcane, serves as a natural sweetener for coffee and tea.
- Alternative names: Balicucha, Balikutsa
- Type: Sweets
- Place of origin: Philippines
- Region or state: Ilocos (Santa Maria)
- Main ingredients: Sugarcane juice
- Variations: Butong-butong, Tira-tira

Balikucha, also spelled balicucha or balikutsa, is a type of traditional sun-dried Filipino pulled sugar candy. It is both eaten as it is, and also used as a sweetener in hot drinks and other foods.

== Making and Usage ==
Balikucha is a confection from the Municipality of Santa Maria, Ilocos Sur, Philippines. It is made by boiling pure sugarcane juice or crystalline sugar (usually muscovado or palm sugar) until it caramelizes and becomes a syrup. It is then pulled and folded repeatedly against a nail until it turns a creamy white color. The resulting ropes of candy are then cut into sections and curled at the ends, resulting in a distinctive shape similar to palmier pastries. They are allowed to dry under the sun before being sold.

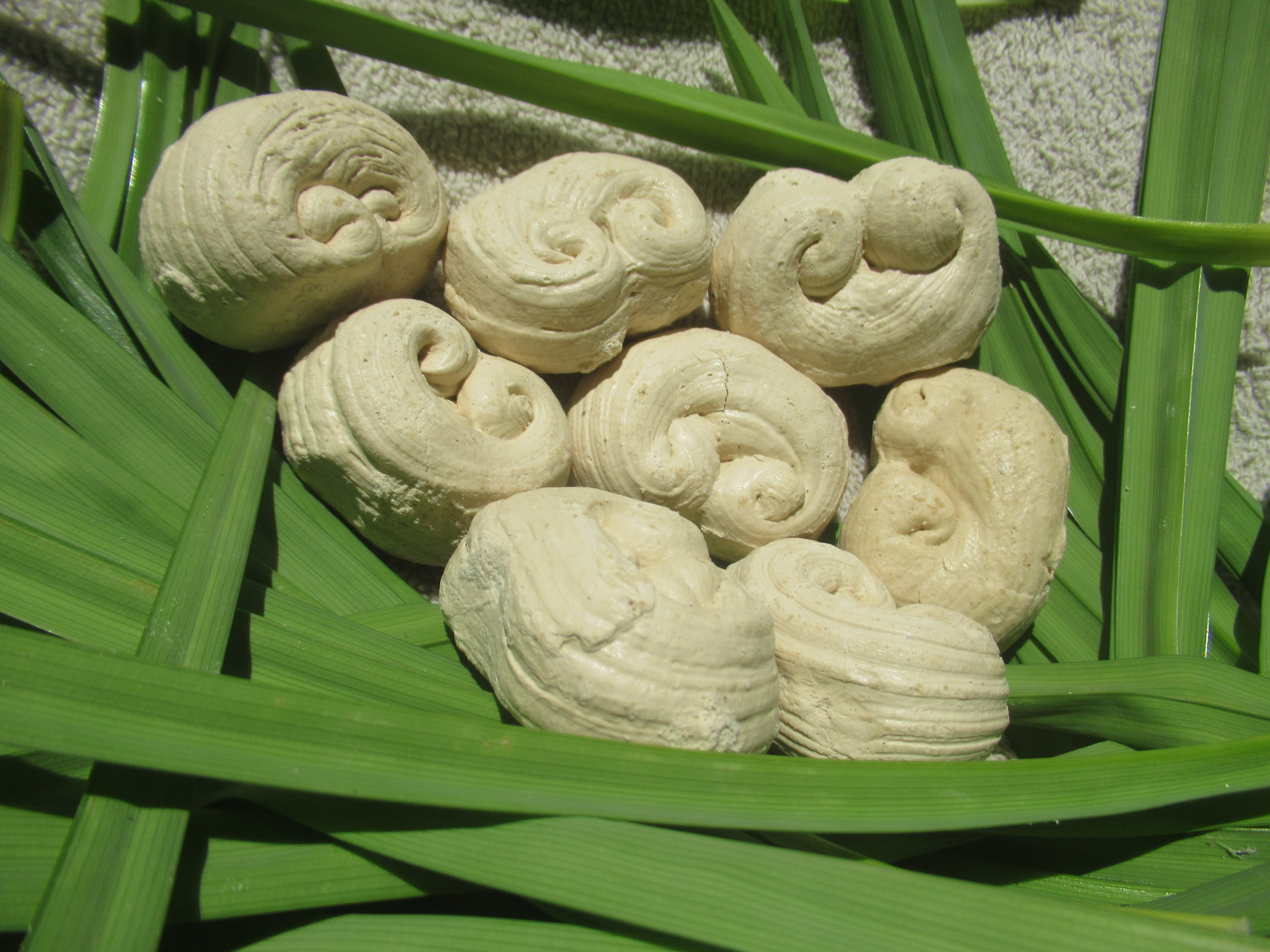
Balikucha of Santa Maria, Ilocos Sur

They can be eaten as is and are popular candies for children. They have a hard porous texture that melts in the mouth. They are also commonly used to sweeten hot drinks like coffee, tsokolate, and tea, as they melt quickly. They can also be melted again into a syrup used to sweeten desserts like cariocas (fried glutinous rice balls).

== Similar Foods ==
Balikucha is similar to the tira-tira candy of the Tagalog regions (which are also sometimes called balikucha) and butong-butong of the Western Visayas, except that tira-tira are shaped into small sticks and butong-butong is shaped into a coil. Balikutsa is also the name for coconut toffee, a traditional chewy candy from the Visayas and Mindanao islands made from hardened coconut milk and sugar syrup.

== Festival ==
Balikucha is celebrated in the annual Balicucha Festival of the town of Santa Maria, Ilocos Sur during the months of March and April.

== See also ==
- Panocha
- Panocha mani
- Taffy (candy)
- Yema
- List of candies
