= Santa Maria Church (Ilocos Sur) =

Roman Catholic church in Ilocos Sur, Philippines

Santa Maria Basilica Shrine
- Minor Basilica and Archdiocesan Shrine of Our Lady of the Assumption
- Basilika Menor ken Santuario ni Santa Maria, Birhen ti Asuncion
- Minor Basilica et Archiepiscopalis Sanctae Mariae Assumptionis Sacerdoctum. (Latin)
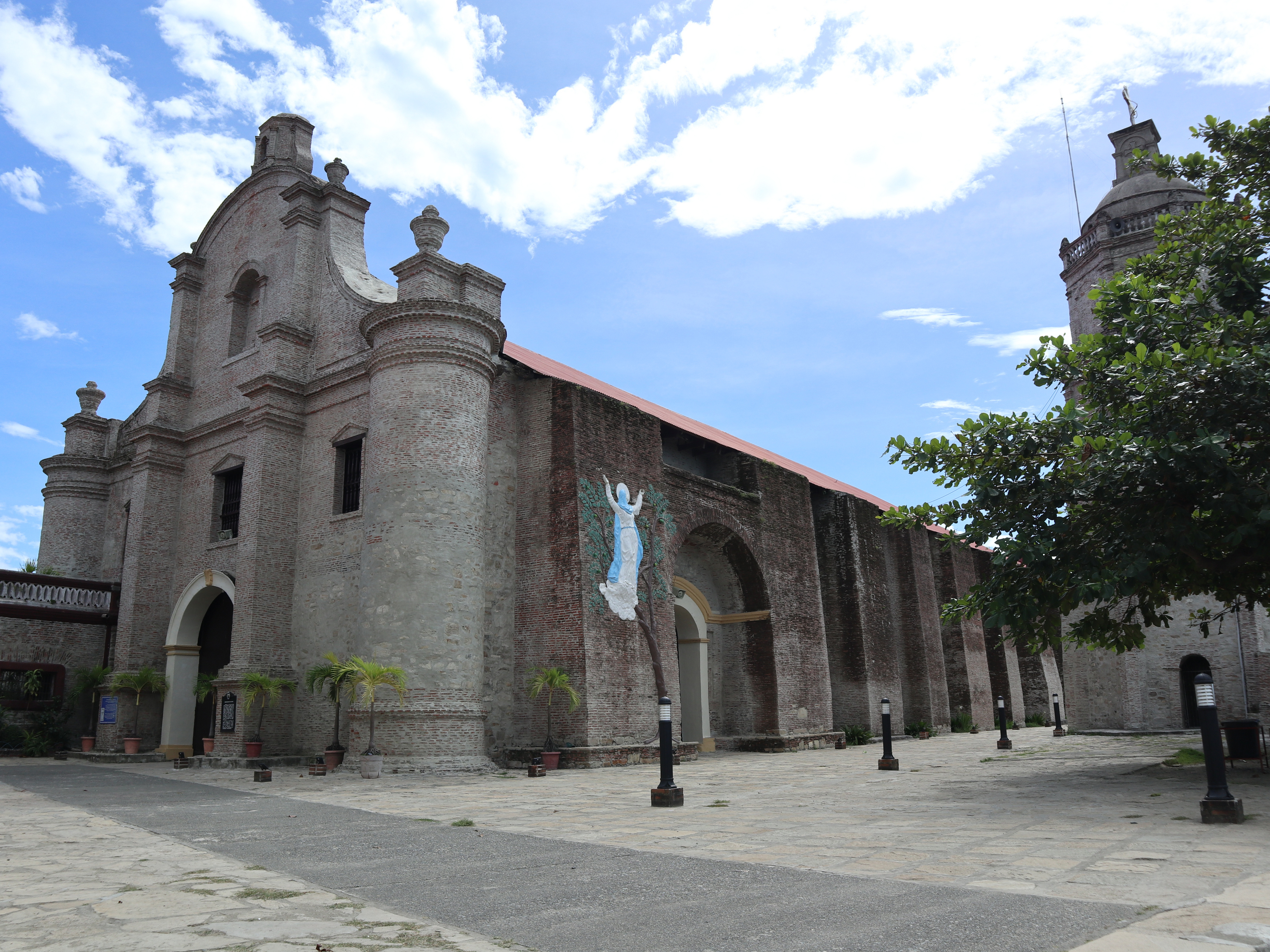
- The church in 2022

- Location in Luzon Location in the Philippines
- 17°22′0″N 120°28′59.2″E
- Location: Santa Maria, Ilocos Sur
- Country: Philippines
- Denomination: Roman Catholic

History
- Status: Minor Basilica, Archdiocesan Shrine, Pro-Cathedral, Parish
- Founder: Augustinian Friars
- Dedication: Nuestra Señora dela Asuncion
- Dedicated: 1765
- Consecrated: 1765

Architecture
- Functional status: Active
- Heritage designation: National Historical Landmark; World Heritage Site; National Cultural Treasure
- Designated: January 14, 1974; December 11, 1993; 2015
- Architect: Augustinians
- Architectural type: Church building
- Style: Earthquake Baroque
- Groundbreaking: 1765
- Construction cost: Polo y Servicio

Specifications
- Capacity: 800
- Length: 99 meters (325 ft) wide.
- Width: 22.7 meters (74 ft)
- Materials: Bricks, Granite, Stones

Administration
- Metropolis: Vigan City
- Archdiocese: Nueva Segovia
- Deanery: Our Lady of the Assumption Vicariate
- Parish: Our Lady of the Assumption

Clergy
- Archbishop: David William V. Antonio, D.D.
- Rector: Fr. Ernesto A. Juarez Jr. Fr. Ramelle J. Rigunay

UNESCO World Heritage Site
- Official name: Church of Nuestra Senora de la Asuncion
- Part of: Baroque Churches of the Philippines
- Criteria: Cultural: (ii)(iv)
- Reference: 677bis-002
- Inscription: 1993 (17th Session)
- Extensions: 2013

National Historical Landmarks
- Official name: Santa Maria Church
- Designated: August 1, 1973
- Reference no.: No. 260, s. 1973

National Cultural Treasures
- Official name: Santa Maria Church and Cemetery Complex
- Type: House of worship
- Designated: December 2015; 10 years ago
- Legal basis: PD No. 260, s. 1973
- Region: Ilocos Region

The Minor Basilica and Archdiocesan Shrine of Our Lady of the Assumption, commonly known as Santa Maria Church, is a Roman Catholic Basilica in Santa Maria, Ilocos Sur, Philippines. The church was designated as a UNESCO World Heritage Site on December 11, 1993, as part of the Baroque Churches of the Philippines, a collection of four Baroque Spanish-era churches. It is currently the Pro-Cathedral of the Archdiocese of Nueva Segovia while the Vigan Cathedral is undergoing repairs.

The Santa Maria Church, situated atop a prominent hill, constitutes an outstanding example of Spanish colonial ecclesiastical architecture in the Philippines. Constructed primarily of brick and mortar, the structure demonstrates a unique synthesis of functional, defensive, and religious design principles. Its elevated position reflects its historical dual role as a place of worship and a fortified citadel, providing both spiritual guidance and strategic oversight during the early Spanish administration. The church’s architectural form, materiality, and spatial organization exemplify the adaptation of European building traditions to the local topography and climate, representing a significant testimony to over four centuries of colonial influence in the region.

== History ==
The parish of Santa Maria started as a chapel-of-ease (visita) of Narvacan, its neighboring town to the north, in 1567. The influx of the settlers after the full conquest of the Ilocos Region by the Spaniards greatly increased the population of Santa Maria. The chapel became an independent ministry in 1769 and was dedicated to the Virgin Mary under the title of Our Lady of the Assumption. Besides economic progress, evangelical missions were expanded. The mission at Santa Maria, located on a narrow flat plain between the sea and the central mountain range of Luzon, close to the interior settlements, made Santa Maria as the center of both the religious and commercial activities.

According to legend, before the Santa Maria Church was built on its present site, the Virgin Mary was enshrined at a different place called Bulala. The frequent disappearance of the Virgin Mary from her previous place of enthronement only to be found perched on a guava tree that grew where the present church is located, had led the townspeople to move the church to its present location.

Father Mariano Dacanay, the Ilocano parish priest from September 1, 1902, to May 27, 1922, has another variation of this legend which he assures, was gathered from reliable sources. He relates that the Blessed Virgin was enthroned in another chapel that was formerly erected below the present church and what is now the Sta. Maria East Central School compound. Father Dacanay adds, that from this chapel, the Virgin Mary made her peregrinations to that guava tree on the knoll.

This version of Father Dacanay of the legend gains greater probability if not credence for today, one of the twin structures bearing the features and architectural designs of what could have been a chapel or a church by then obtaining standards remains intact in said school compound and presently used as a classroom for grade school pupils.

There are many stories or legends concerning the Virgin Mother that have long been associated with the Philippines' religious tradition. But of all the stories, if any can be believed to be true, it is the story of the blessed Virgin manifesting her miraculous preference for a place she would permanently dwell in.

Construction of the present church was started in 1765. In 1810, the bell tower was built during the renovation of the church and furnished with a bell the following year. During the renovation of church complex in 1863, the protective wall around the sides of the hill was constructed. After the bell tower was remodeled the same year, its foundation must have gradually settled down making the imposing structure slightly leaning or tilting as it appears today. The convent was greatly renovated in 1895.

Many foreigners who traveled to the north and saw the church were much impressed by its size and setting calling the church as a cathedral. Henry Savage Landor, an English painter, writer and explorer who visited the Philippines in 1900, says:

At Santa Maria a most picturesque church is to be found, reached on an imposing flight of steps. An enormous convent stands beside the church, upon a terrace some 80 feet above the plaza. There are a number of brick buildings, schoolhouses and office, which must have been very handsome but are tumbling down, the streets being in the absolute possession of sheeps [sic], goats and hogs. A great expanse of level land was now well-cultivated into paddy fields and across it is a road fifteen feet wide, well-metalled and with a sandy surface. Barrios and homes were scattered all around the plain.

The church was listed as one of the most endangered monuments in the world by World Monuments Fund in the 2010 World Monuments Watch, along with the Rice Terraces of the Philippine Cordilleras and San Sebastian Church, Manila. All of the sites were taken off the list in 2011 after the passage of the National Cultural Heritage Act.

The parish church was elevated to an archdiocesan shrine on August 15, 2022.

On November 18, 2024, Pope Francis declared the archdiocesan shrine as a minor basilica, making it the second basilica of the province.

== Design ==
Unlike other town churches in the Philippines, which conform to the Spanish tradition of sitting them on the central plaza, the Church and Convent of Our Lady of the Assumption in Santa Maria are situated on a hill surrounded by a defensive wall on all sides like a fortress. The church can be reached by climbing an 85-step stairway of granite rock. The grand three-flight stairway leads to a courtyard in front of the church doorway where a sweeping view of the lower plains and the town of Santa Maria may be made. A narrow roadway coming from the back of the church also leads up to the courtyard but is only used on special occasions.

=== Façade ===
The church brick façade has one large portal with three windows. The recessed arched entrance is flanked by a pair of rectangular pilaster dividing the façade into three well-defined planes. The whole façade is then framed on the sides by heavy circular buttresses topped by urn-like finials.

An open pediment in the upper façade is topped by a small cupola. The curvilinear shape of the pediment serves as a graceful finish to the upward movement of the pilasters and the arch entrance. The blind niche, urn-shaped pinnacles and even proportions-overlooking at the top are decorative devices of the upward movement.

=== Nave ===
The church follows the standard Philippine layout with the façade fronting a long single nave rectangular building. The church measures about 99 meters (325 ft) long and 22.7 meters (74 ft) wide. The thick outer walls have delicately carved side entrances with few openings. The eastern and western side of the outer walls are reinforced by thirteen huge rectangular buttresses each typical of Earthquake Baroque architecture. The first buttress from the front is adorned by a huge relief retelling how the statue of Our Lady of Assumption was found on top of a tree. The relief is visible as one ascends the front stairway. The middle buttress on the eastern wall (back) is built like a staircase for easy maintenance of the roof back when thatched roof was the norm in Philippine churches, before the advent of corrugated galvanised iron (CGI). The lighter CGI roof is also preferred in earthquake-prone areas than tile roof.

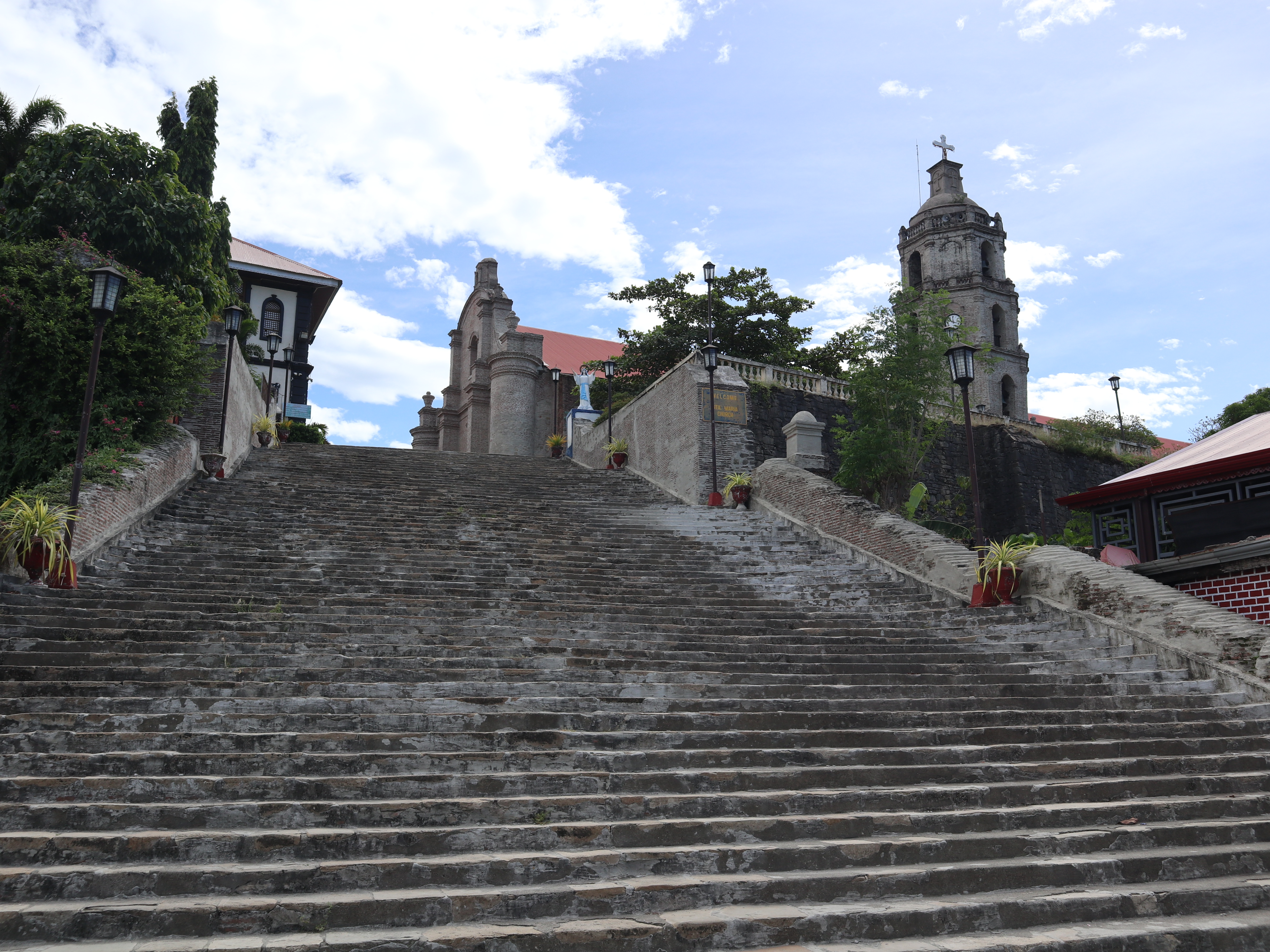
Steps leading to church

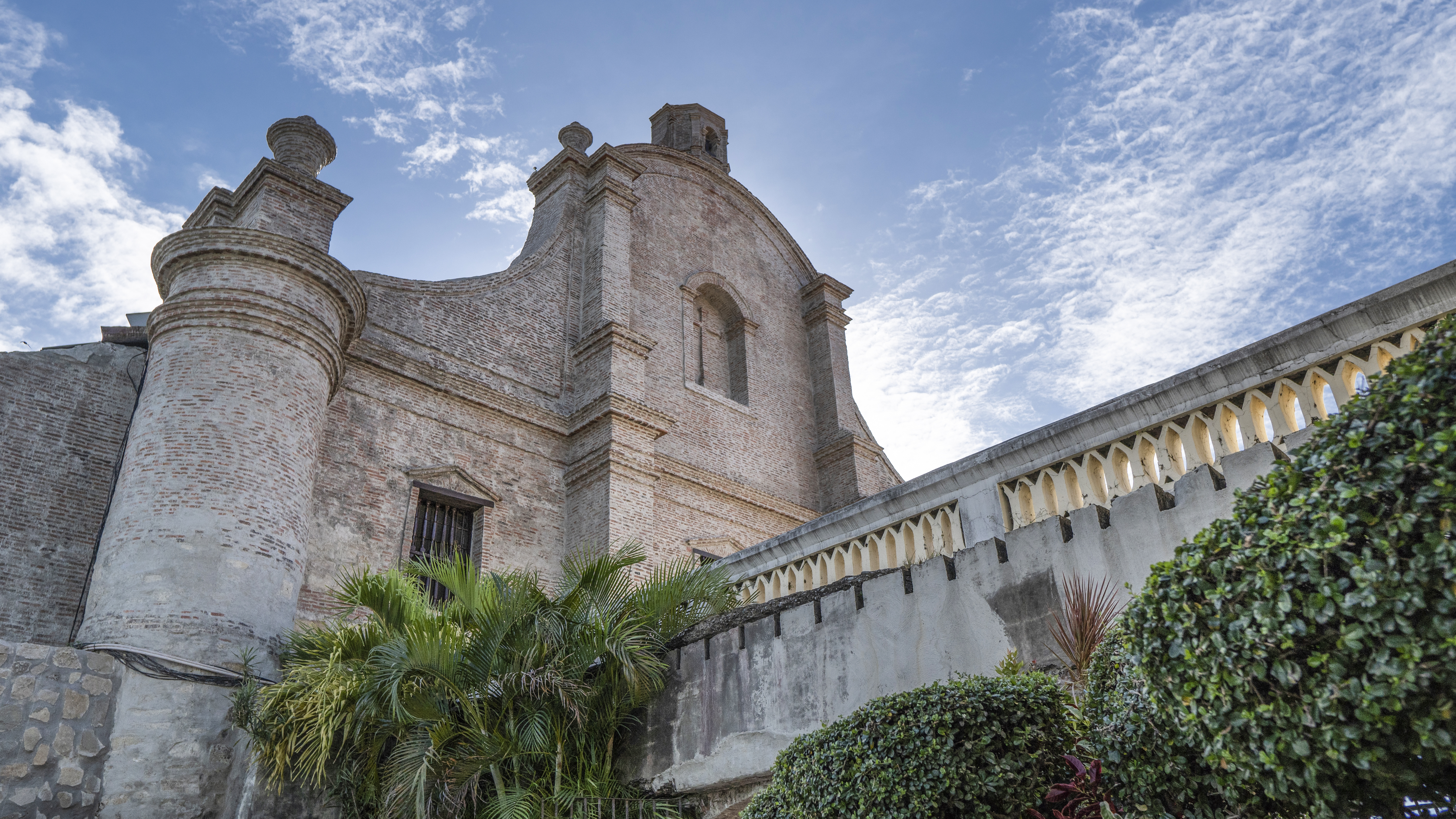
Façade

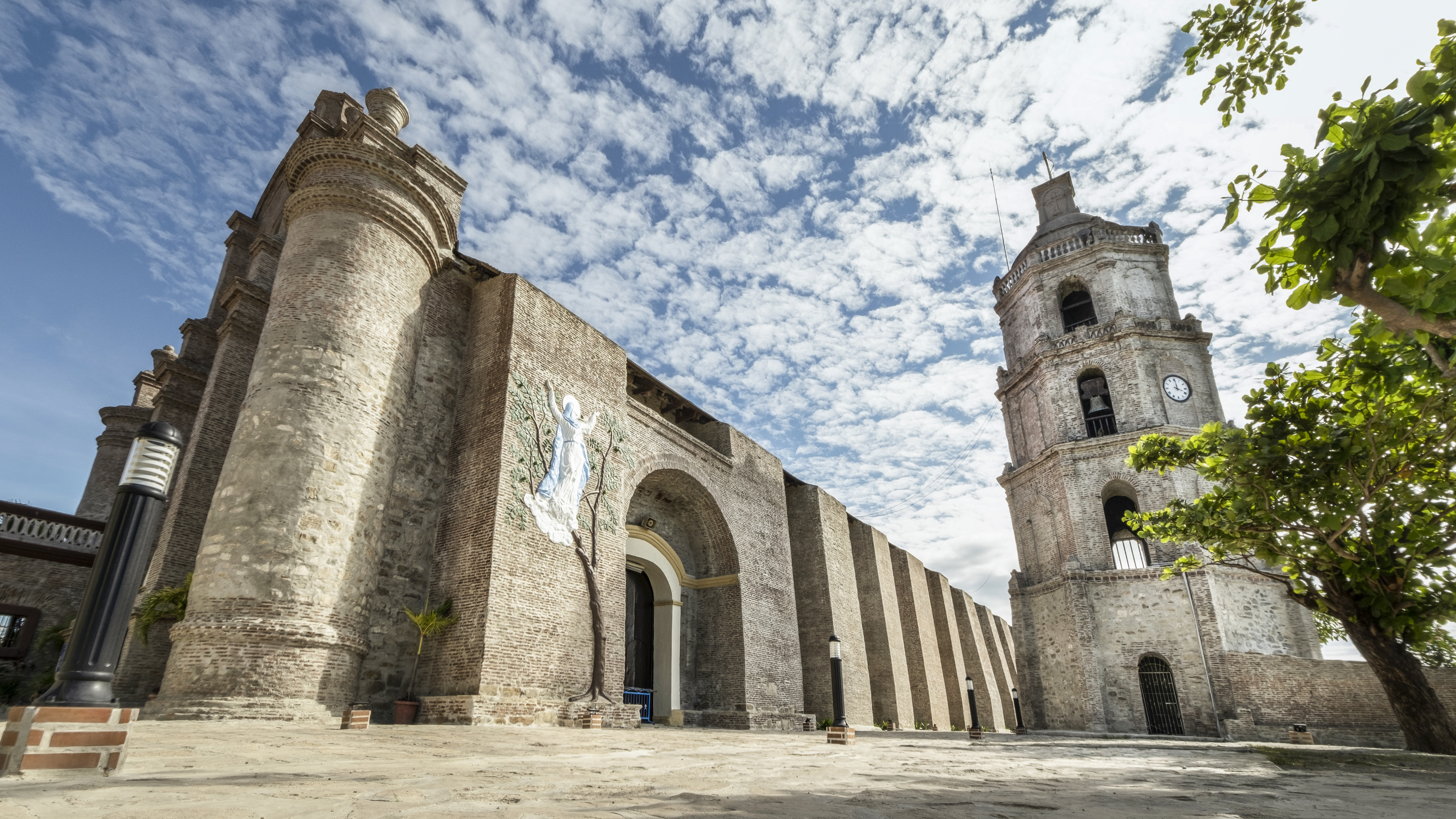
Side portal, with relief depicting the legend of the founding of the church, and bell tower

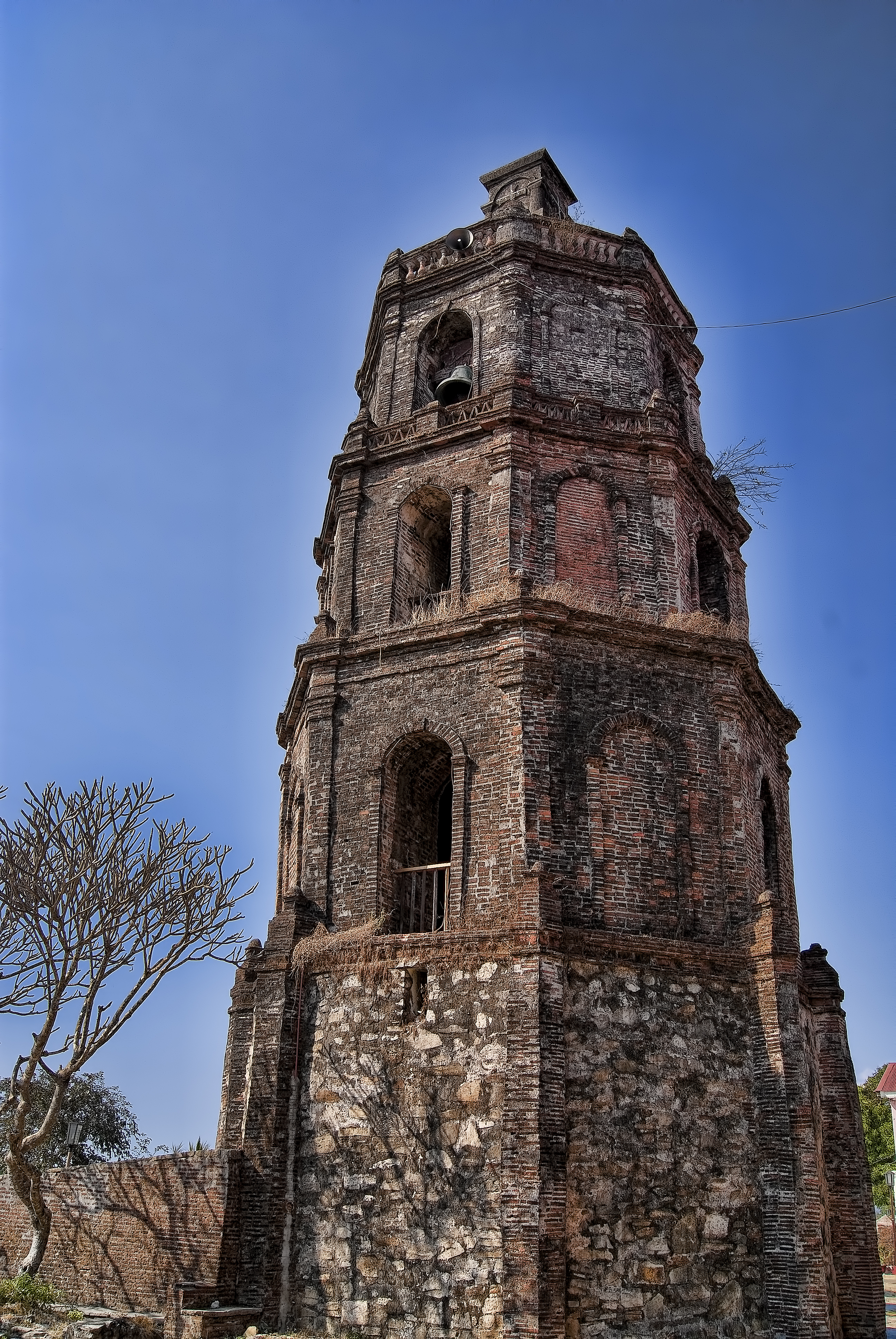
Bell tower

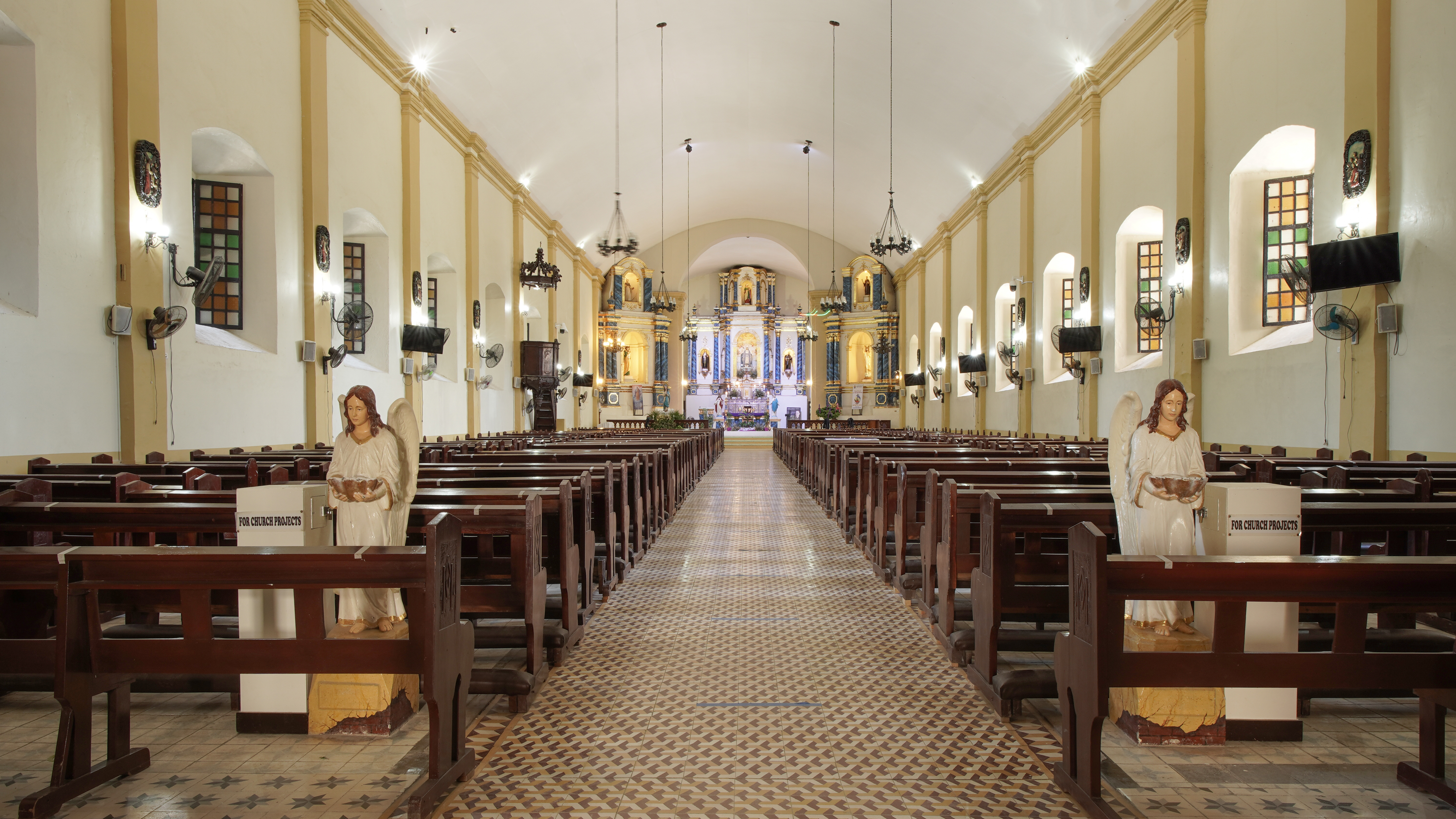
Nave in 2021

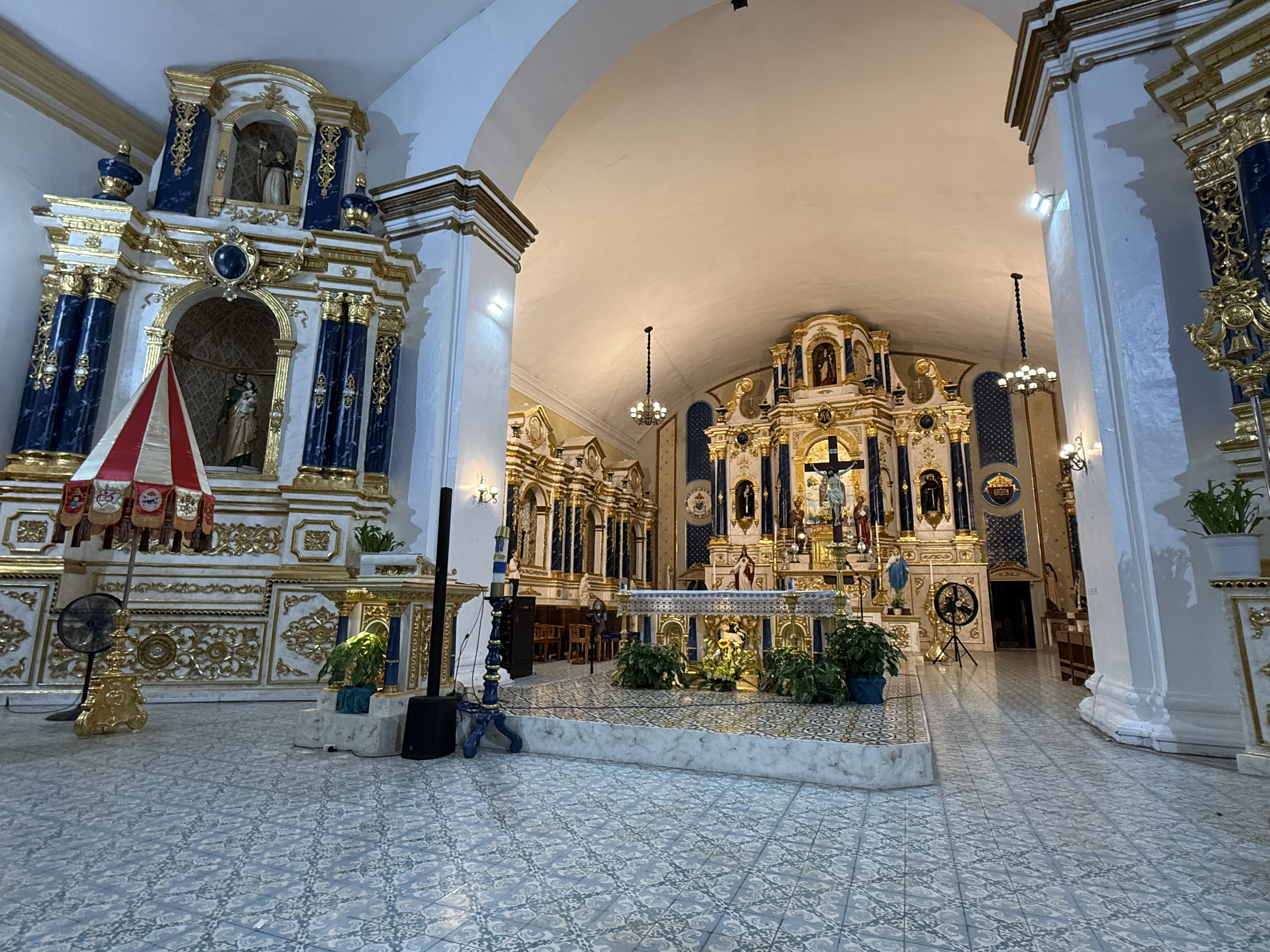
Main altar with umbraculum denoting the status of the church as a minor basilica

=== Bell tower ===
The bell tower is freestanding, constructed separate from the church and not parallel to the façade but situated about a third of the wall from the front. The octagonal four-story tower was built wide, with each level narrowing till it reaches the top, typical of earthquake baroque church towers. The top floor is covered by a dome that is capped by cupola. A cross above the cupola tops the structure. Blank walls are arranged alternately with open windows. Other decorative devices, like single pilasters, finials and balustrades indicate that this form is of later vintage. A clock on the third level faces the stairway for the churchgoers to see. Six bells are hung, five are seen from the outside, and a big bell can be found inside.

=== Convent ===
In front of the church is the convent, partly blocking the frontal view of the façade of Santa Maria Church. The placement of the convent in front of the church and not adjacent is another unusual characteristic of the building, probably dictated by the long narrow hill on which the church is located. It is accessible from the church by an elevated stone walkway. In the early days of the colonization, the convent was the seat of the ecclesiastical administration as well as home of the church clergies. Under the elevated walkway is a gate that leads to the back courtyard with a commanding view of the back countryside.

=== Cemetery ===
Another wide stairway, similar to the front, leads down from the courtyard to a brick walkway that leads to an old abandoned cemetery evergreen with brush and weeds. Within the brick fence of the square-shaped cemetery are the ruins of an old brick chapel and old graveyards.

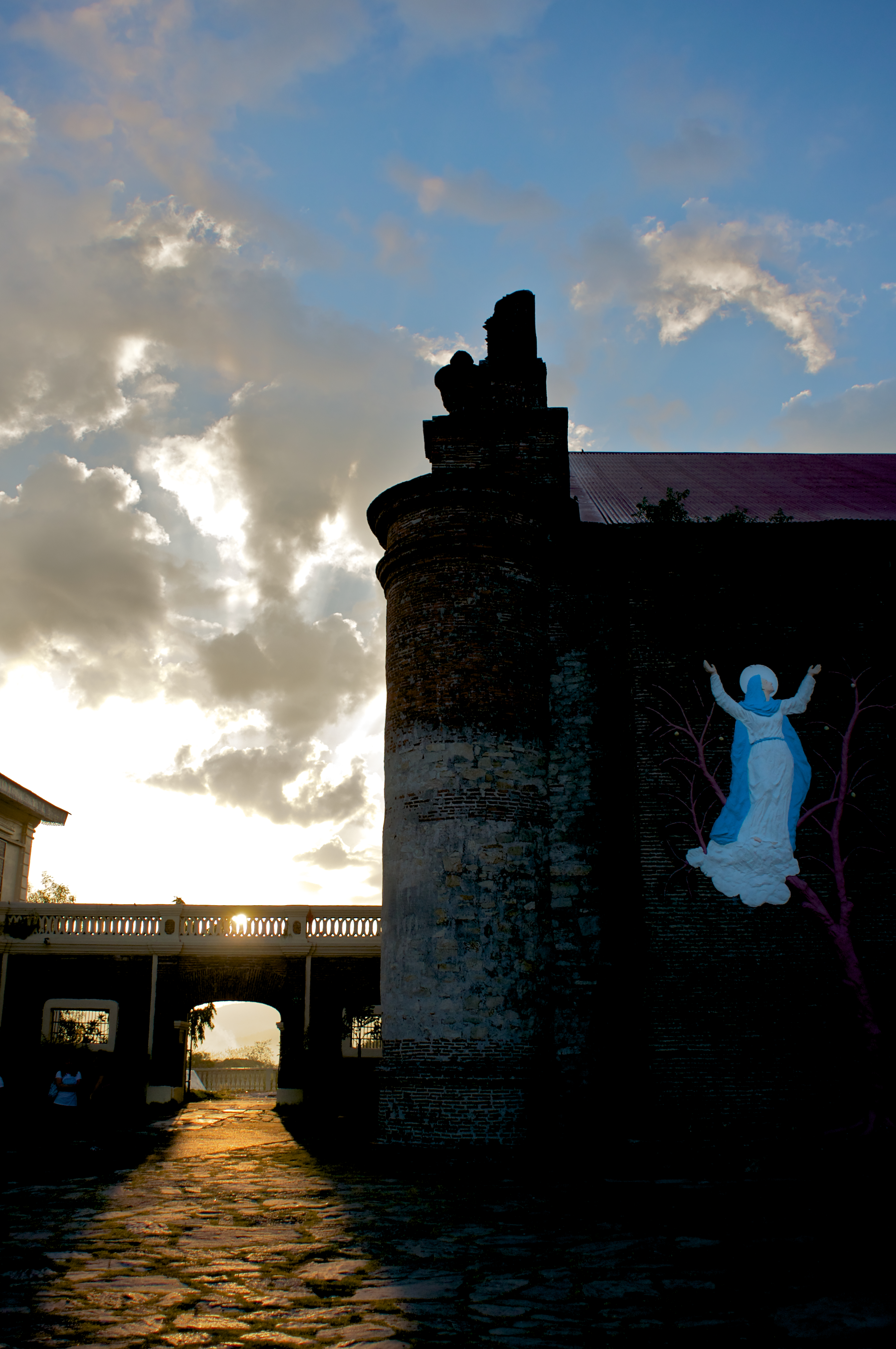
The elevated walkway connecting the convent to the church

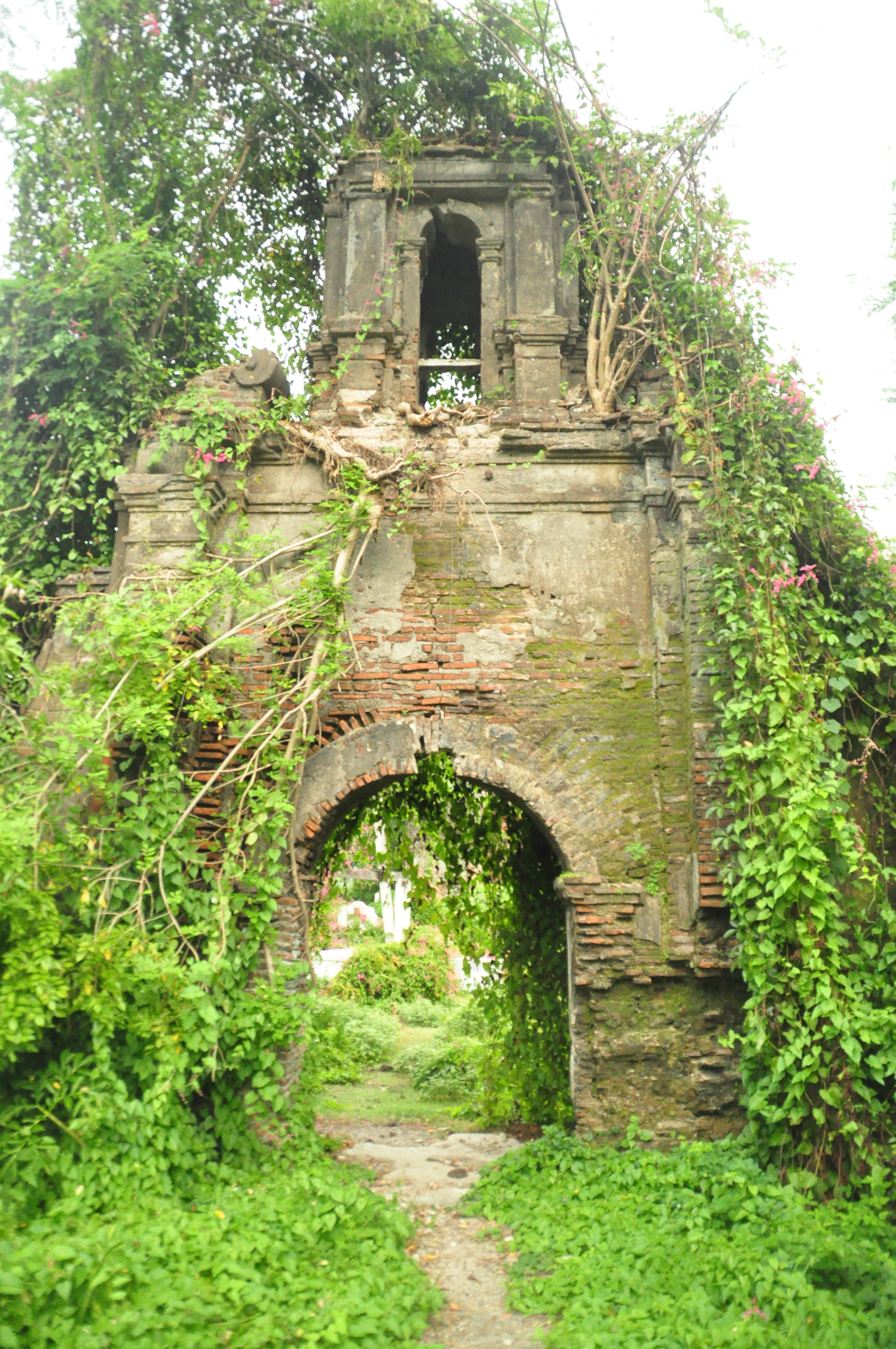
Cemetery portal in 2014, prior to restoration

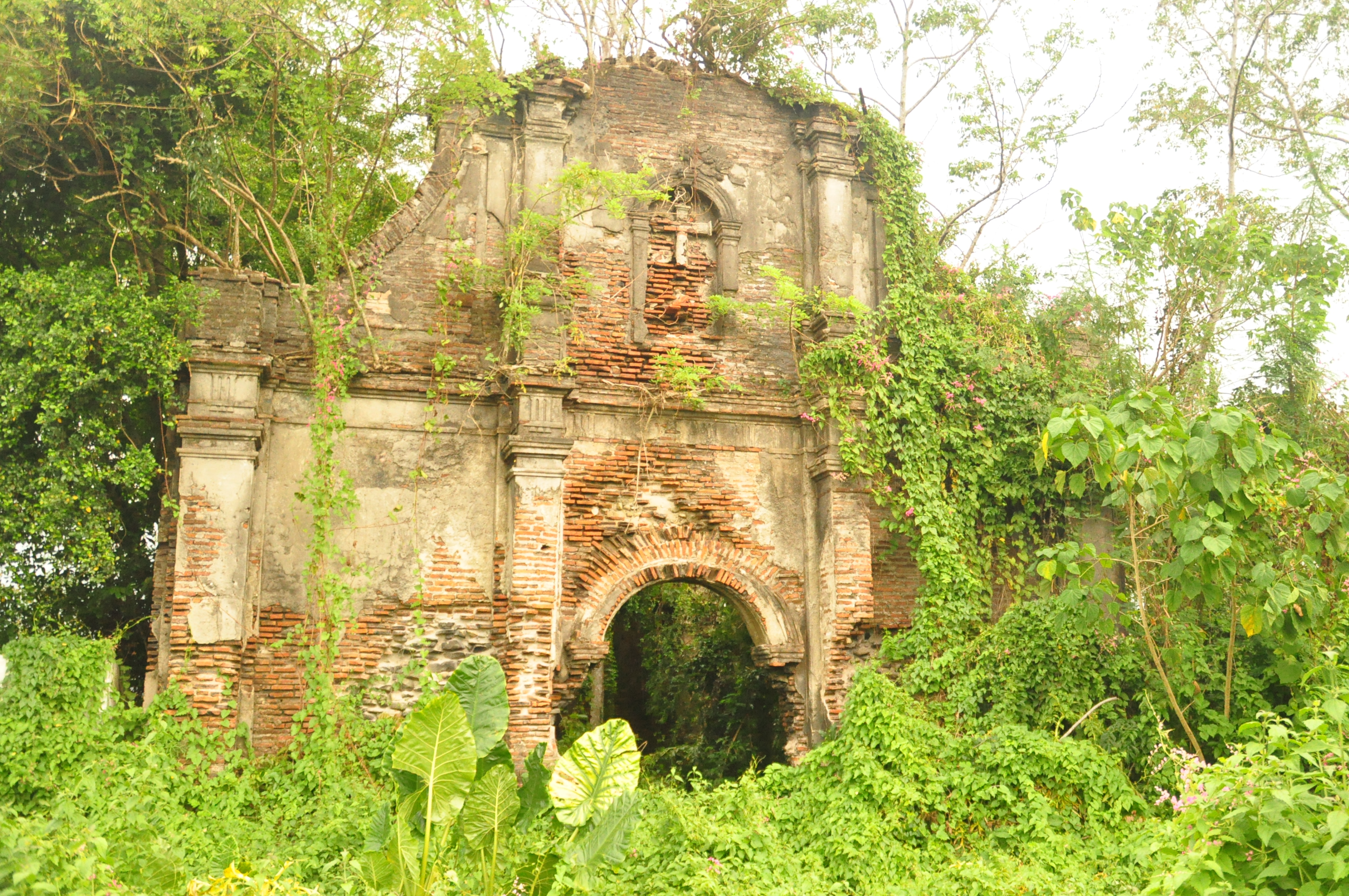
Ruins of the mortuary chapel in 2014, prior to restoration

== Historical designations ==
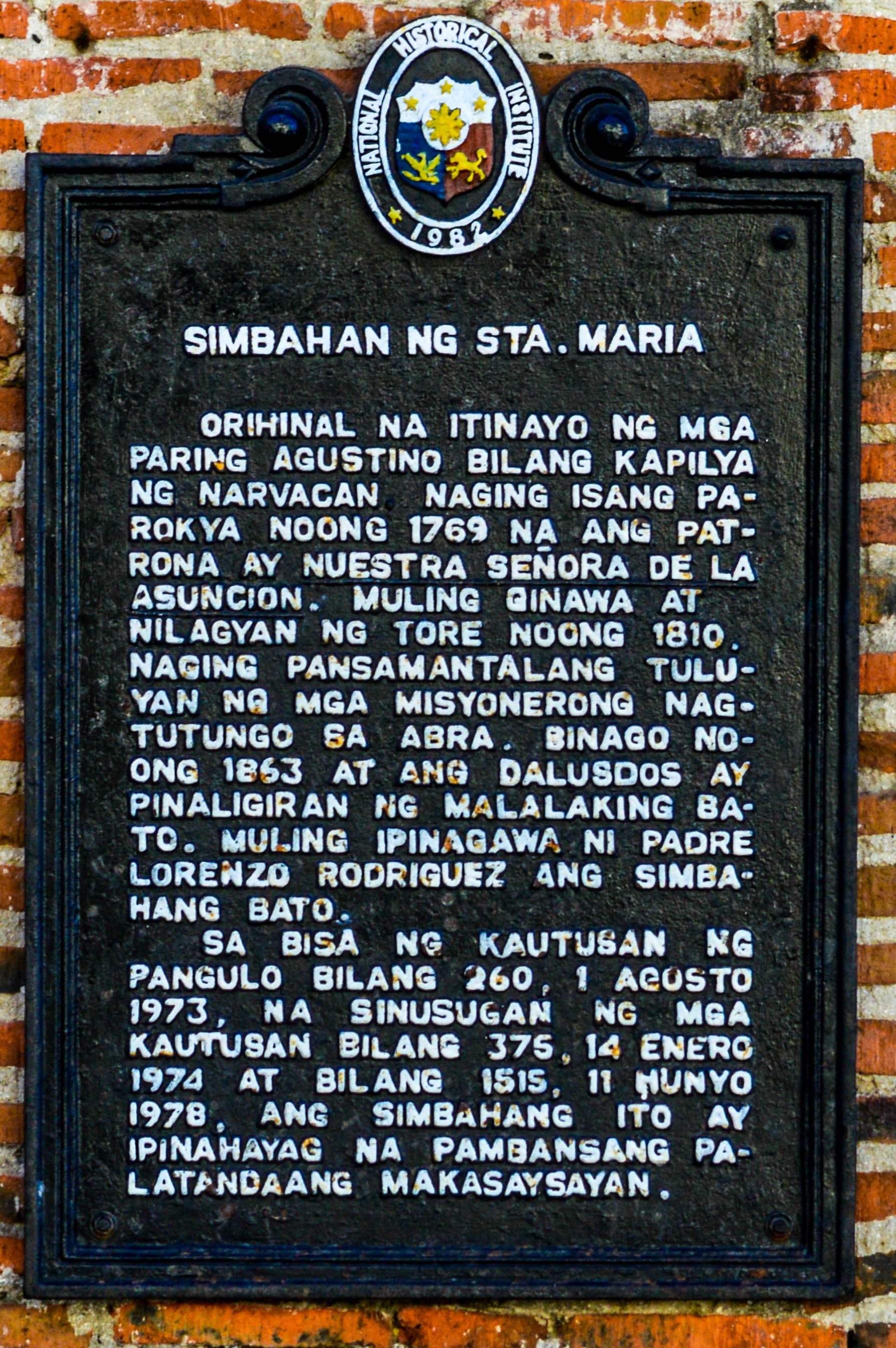
Church NHI historical marker installed in 1982

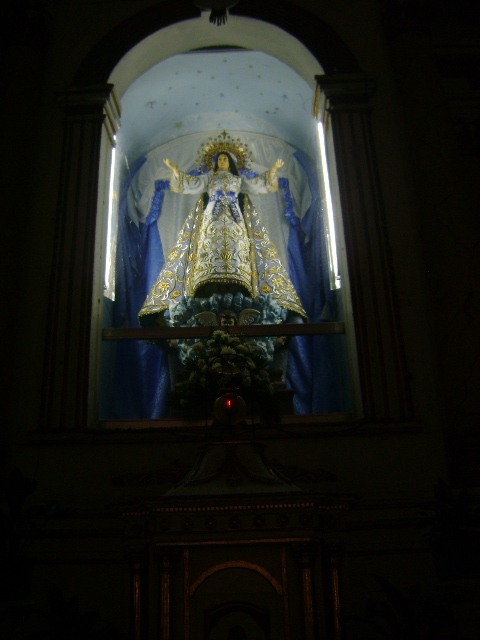
Image of Apo Baket on the main altar

The National Historical Institute (now the National Historical Commission of the Philippines) installed a marker next to the door of Santa Maria Church following Executive Order Nos. 260 on August 1, 1973; 375 on January 14, 1974; and 1515 on June 11, 1978, declaring the Santa Maria Church as a National Historical Landmark.

== Miraculous image of Our Lady of the Assumption (Apo Baket) ==
The statue of Apo Baket is made of wood in ornate sculptural style with ivory face and hands. It is 112 centimeters (44 in) tall. Her hands are extended wide, and her head is looking upward portraying her assumption into heaven. Her blue cape is decorated with silver floral designs and her white dress is embroidered with gold thread motif. She stands on a pedestal of cloud surrounded by angels’ heads. This image, along with her bejeweled dress, was kept in an elaborate carved wooden chest believed to have been used for cargo in galleon ship. Her feast day is August 15.

Last August 15, 2026 after the Pontifical Mass at the Minor Basilica of Our Lady of the Assumption, presided over by His Excellency Most Rev. David William V. Antonio, Archbishop of Nueva Segovia, announced that the venerable and miraculous ivory image of Apo Baket is granted and is set to receive the honor of Episcopal Coronation on October 31, 2026.
