= Ilocos Sur =

Province in Ilocos Region, Philippines

- Province
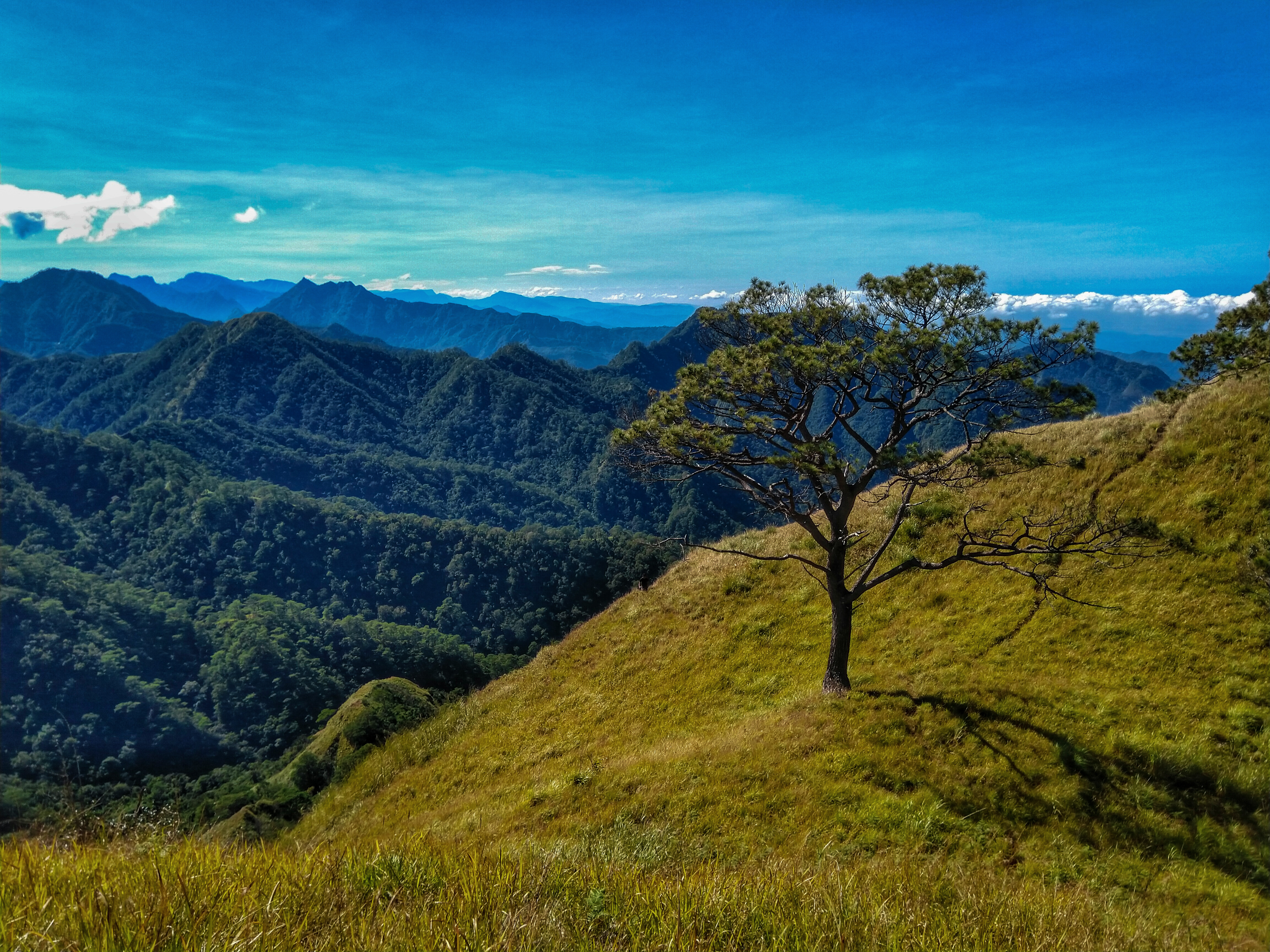
- Clockwise from the top: Ilocos Sur Capitol, Calle Crisologo, Old Quirino Bridge and Lagben River, Mount Tuwato, Bantay Church Belltower

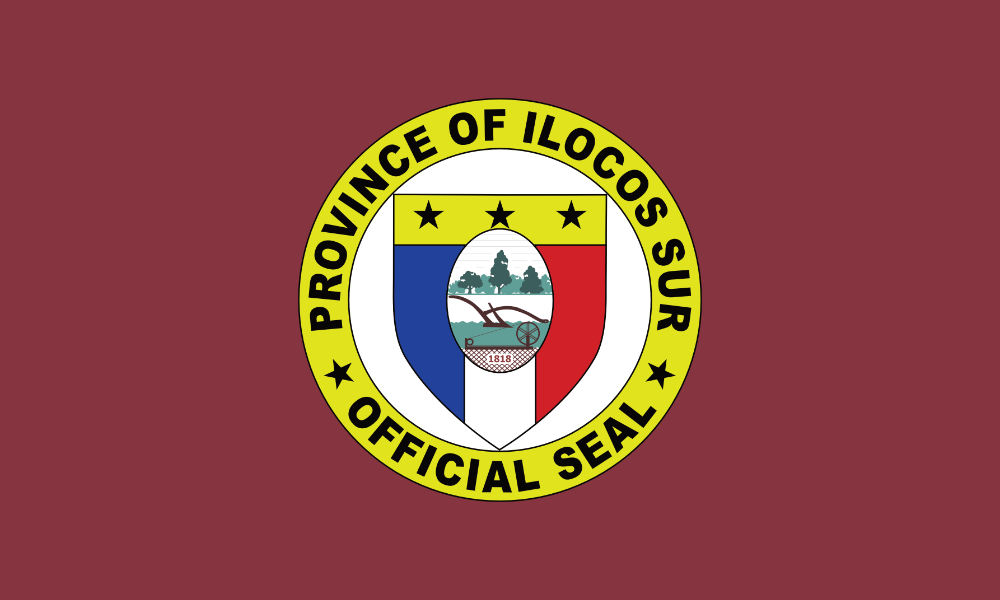
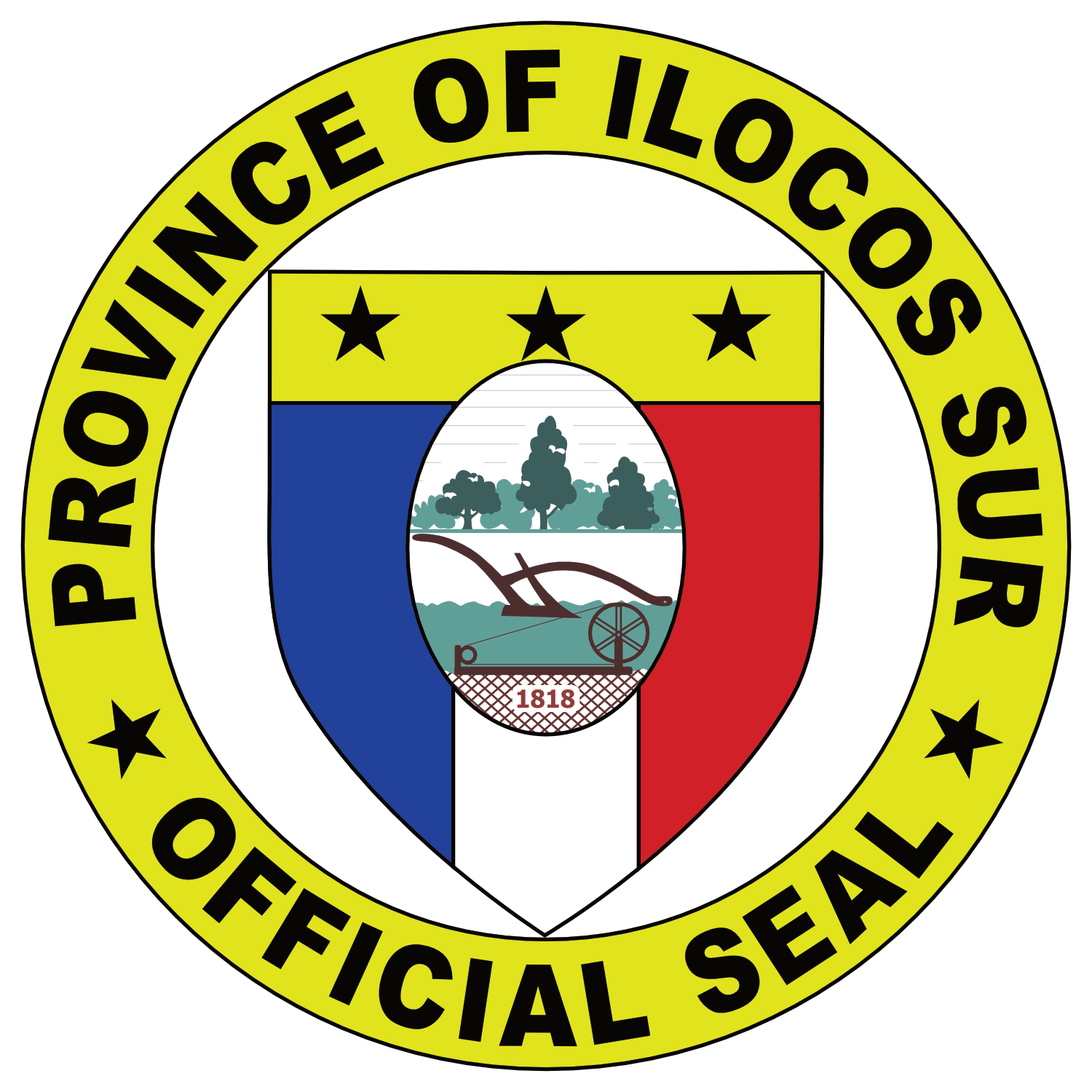
- Flag Seal
- Nickname: The Heritage Haven of the North
- Location in the Philippines
- Interactive map of Ilocos Sur
- Coordinates: 17°20′N 120°35′E
- Country: Philippines
- Region: Ilocos Region
- Founded: February 2, 1818
- Capital: Vigan
- Largest city: Candon

Government
  - Governor: Jeremias C. Singson (NPC/Bileg)
  - Vice Governor: Ryan Luis V. Singson (Lakas/Bileg)
  - Legislature: Ilocos Sur Provincial Board
  - Electorate: 487,233 voters (2025)

Area
  - Total: 2,596.00 km^{2} (1,002.32 sq mi)
  - Rank: 51st out of 82
- Highest elevation (Mount Camingingel): 2,371 m (7,779 ft)

Population (2024 census)
  - Total: 709,991
  - Rank: 43rd out of 82
  - Density: 273.494/km^{2} (708.347/sq mi)
  - Rank: 33rd out of 82
  - Households: 172,048
- Demonyms: Ilocano (m/n); Ilocana (f)

Divisions
  - Independent cities: 0
  - Component cities: 2: Candon; Vigan
  - Municipalities: 32: Alilem; Banayoyo; Bantay; Burgos; Cabugao; Caoayan; Cervantes; Galimuyod; Gregorio del Pilar; Lidlidda; Magsingal; Nagbukel; Narvacan; Quirino; Salcedo; San Emilio; San Esteban; San Ildefonso; San Juan; San Vicente; Santa; Santa Catalina; Santa Cruz; Santa Lucia; Santa Maria; Santiago; Santo Domingo; Sigay; Sinait; Sugpon; Suyo; Tagudin
  - Barangays: 768
  - Districts: Legislative districts of Ilocos Sur

Economy
  - Income class: 1st provincial income class
  - Poverty incidence: 5.2% (2023)
  - Revenue: ₱ 9,681 million (2024)
  - Assets: ₱ 26,118 million (2024)
  - Expenditure: ₱ 4,427 million (2024)
  - Liabilities: ₱ 4,179 million (2024)
  - HDI: ▲0.70 (High)
  - HDI rank: 19th (2019)
- Time zone: UTC+8 (PST)
- PSGC: 012900000
- IDD : area code: +63 (0)77
- ISO 3166 code: PH-ILS
- Spoken languages: Ilocano; Kankana-ey; Filipino; English
- Website: mis.ilocossur.gov.ph

Ilocos Sur (lit. 'South Ilocos'), officially the Province of Ilocos Sur (Ilocano: Probinsia ti Ilocos Sur; Tagalog: Lalawigan ng Ilocos Sur), is a province in the Philippines located in the Ilocos Region in Luzon. Located on the mouth of the Mestizo River is the capital of Vigan, while Candon is the most-populous city. Ilocos Sur is bordered by Ilocos Norte and Abra to the north, Mountain Province to the east, La Union and Benguet to the south and the South China Sea to the west.

Ilocos Sur was established in 1818 when the province of Ilocos was split into two: the north (now Ilocos Norte) and the south (Ilocos Sur). At that time, it included parts of Abra and the upper half of present-day La Unión. The current boundaries of the province set in March 1917 by virtue of Act No. 2683.

The province is home to two UNESCO World Heritage Sites, namely, the Heritage City of Vigan and the Santa Maria Basilica Shrine.

== History ==
=== Early history ===
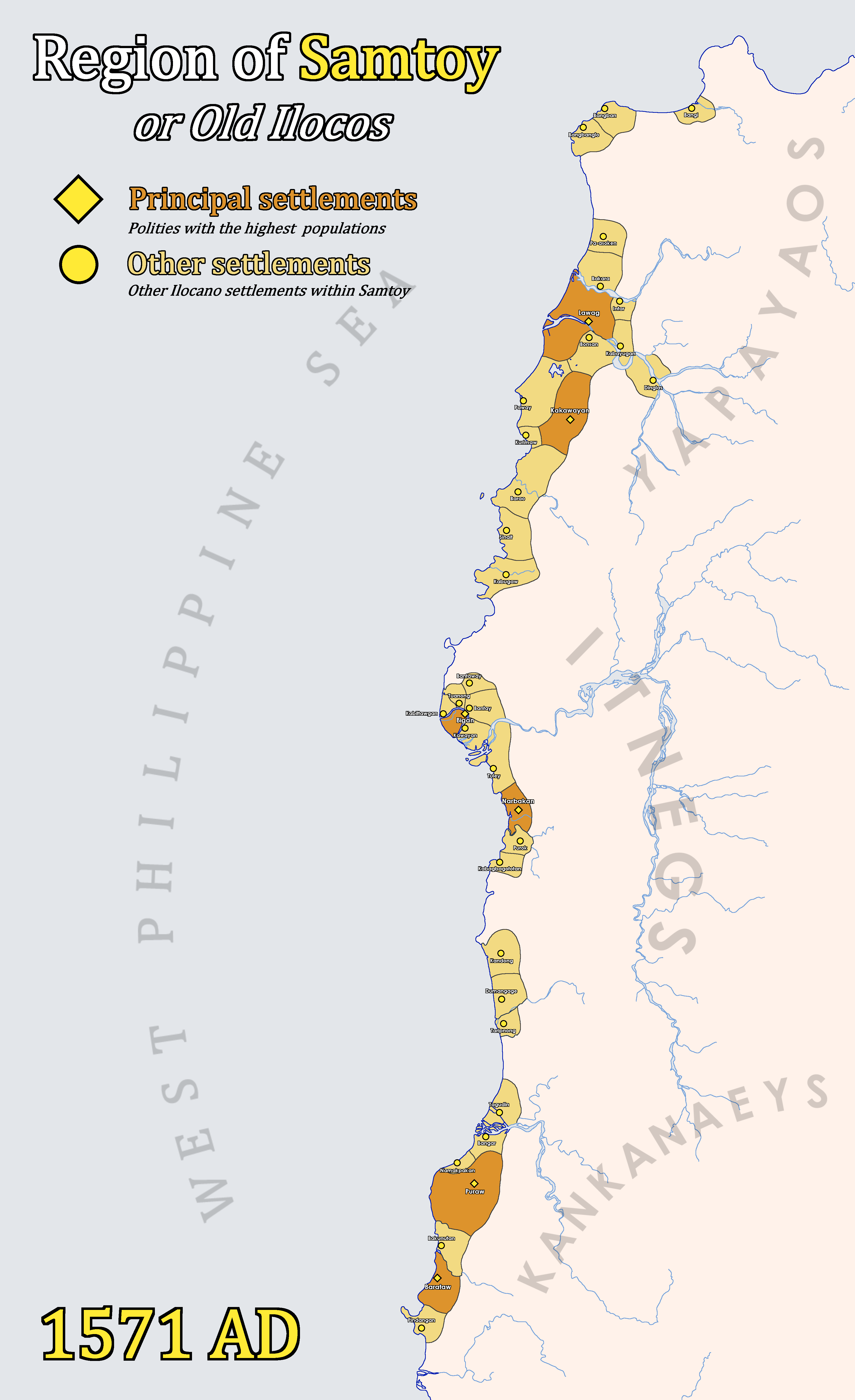
Map of Samtoy or Old Ilocos in 1571 before the expedition of Juan de Salcedo

Before the arrival of the Spanish, the coastal plains in northwest Luzón from Bangui in the north to Namacpacan in the south were part of a region called the Ylokos. It lies between the South China Sea in the west and the Northern Cordilleras in the east. On the western side, the land is sandy; while on the eastern side (near the mountains that separate the region from the Mountain Province) the land is rocky. This left a narrow strip of plains for cultivation. The mountains come so close to the sea that the highway is carved into them. The pressure of an increasing population and the need for land made the people thrifty, and they built their villages near small bays and coves called looc in the local dialect. These coastal inhabitants were known as Ylocos, which means "from the lowlands". The region was then called by the ancient name Samtoy, from sao mi ditoy ("our language" in Ilocano).

=== Spanish colonial era ===
The Ilocos region was a thriving and fairly advanced cluster of towns and settlements familiar to Chinese, Japanese, and Malay traders when the Spanish explorer Juan de Salcedo arrived in Vigan on June 13, 1572. The Spanish made Cabigbigaan their headquarters, which Salcedo called Villa Fernandina. It also became known as the Intramuros de Ilocandia. Salcedo declared all of Northern Luzón an encomienda (land grant). He was the encomendero of Vigan and lieutenant governor of Ylokos until his death in July 1574.

Augustinian missionaries evangelized the region, establishing parishes and building churches that still stand. Three centuries later, Vigan became the seat of the Archdiocese of Nueva Segovia.

The coast of Samtoy was known to the Spanish colonizers in 1572, when Juan de Salcedo traveled along it. Sent by Miguel López de Legazpi to explore the island of Luzón, Salcedo founded Ciudad Fernandina in 1574 in Bigan, in present-day Ilocos Sur. It became the center of Spanish rule and influence, including the evangelization and pacification movements. Due to Salcedo's efforts, the settlements in Tagurín, Santa Lucía, Nalbacán, Bantay, Candón and Sinayt were pacified and paid tribute to the King of Spain.

==== Conversions ====
According to the Spanish chronicler Pigafetta, "The Ilocos are all Christians and are the humblest and most tractable". The Augustinians established parishes in Santa in 1576, Tagurín in 1586, Santa Lucía in 1586, Nalbacán in 1587, Candón in 1591, and Bantay in 1590. They built a church in Bigan in 1641 which later became the Cathedral of the Episcopal See of Nueva Segovia after 117 years.

==== Partition of Ylokos ====
Ylokos consisted of the present-day provinces of Ilocos Norte, Ilocos Sur, Abra and part of Mountain Province. A royal decree of February 2, 1818 separated Ilocos Norte from Ilocos Sur, the latter including northern La Union (as far as Namacpacan, present-day Luna) and present-day Abra. The sub-provinces of Lepanto and Amburayan in Mountain Province were annexed by Ilocos Sur.

At the same year as 1818, the census declared that there were 61,897 tributaries-families, and of which, 530 tribute-families were Spanish-Filipinos and 14 were newly Christianised Chinese-Filipinos Of which, the number of Spanish-Families and their residences are as follows: 86 (Santo Domingo), 10 (San Vicente Ferrer) and 421 (Vigan).

The passage of Act No. 2683 by the Philippine Legislature in March 1917 defined the province's current geographical boundaries.

==== Vigan ====
Vigan, almost four centuries old, was once known as Kabigbigaan (from biga, a coarse, erect plant with large, ornate leaves that grows on riverbanks). Bigan was later changed to Vigan. To the Spanish it was Villa Fernandina, in honor of King Ferdinand.

Vigan was founded in 1574 by Spanish conquistador Juan de Salcedo as the capital of Ylocos. The town, with a population of 8,000 (greater than that of Manila at the time), was the center of Ilocano civilization before Salcedo's arrival. It was somewhat prosperous, trading with the Chinese and Japanese who brought jars, silk and crockery through the nearby port of Pandan, Caoayan.

In the 19th century, Vigan traded with Europe. Ships loaded with indigo delivered their goods to textile mills. The invention of chemical dyes in Germany eliminated this industry. Affluent citizens of Vigan stocked their homes with statuettes of brass and iron, dinnerware, and other artifacts of European civilization, including fine ivory, inlaid furniture, and Chinese wares.

==== Social institutions ====
Salcedo bequeathed his encomienda to a select group who continued the tenancy system which developed into the practice of caciquism, landlordism and usury. The kaillanes revolted against the aristocracy in 1762. Vigan's two sections during the mid-19th-century indigo boom—one for the meztizos and the other for the naturales—remain distinct.

==== Initial migration ====
Spanish colonizers used free labor in the development of Ilocos Sur. Resentment of free labor triggered sporadic revolts, and those who refused to be slaves or tenants left the region for Abra and the Cagayan Valley. From 1898 to the first decade of the 20th century, covered oxcarts moved to the rich plains of Pangasinan, Nueva Ecija and Tarlac. Children were told tales of Lam-ang, Angalo, Aran, Juan Sadot and other legendary Ilocano characters. Folk songs such as "Pamulinawen", "Manang Biday", and "Dungdungwen Kanto Unay, Unay" became popular.

==== Economic prosperity ====
The first half of the 19th century was an economic boom for Ilocos Sur. During this period, the cotton, tobacco and indigo industries were encouraged by the government. With the operations of the Royal Company of the Philippines (Real Compañía de Filipinas), the textile industry was developed on a large scale and the abolition of the tobacco monopoly accelerated economic progress.

==== Revolts ====
The beginning of Spanish rule to the first decade of the nineteenth century was characterized by revolts against tribute, forced labor and monopolies. The Ilocos revolt (1762–1763), better known as Silang's Revolt, was aimed at the babaknangs and the alcalde-mayor of Vigan. After Diego Silang's assassination on May 28, 1763, his wife Maria Josefa Gabriela continued the fight until she was captured and hanged on September 20, 1763. A revolt against the government monopoly of basi, the native wine, began on September 16, 1807. Regular troops and recruits defeated the rebels.

On March 25, 1898, Isabelo Abaya began an uprising in Candón and raised a red flag in the town plaza as a response to Spanish abuses and oppression. A revolutionary government was established, and several other revolts followed. The Spanish sent shock troops to re-occupy Candon, and most of the leaders and participants in the uprising who surrendered were arrested and executed.

==== Philippine Revolution and Philippine-American War ====
Ilocos Sur, like other Philippine provinces, rallied behind Emilio Aguinaldo in the 1896 Philippine Revolution. When Vigan was captured, the rebels made Bishop's Palace their headquarters. On March 21, 1898, Mariano Acosta of Candón established a provincial revolutionary government. When General Aguinaldo returned from exile in Hong Kong, he sent Manuel Tinio to wage guerilla warfare on the Americans. Vigan was Tinio's headquarters until it was occupied by the U.S. 45th Infantry Division under James Parker on December 4, 1899. Gregorio del Pilar died on December 2, 1899, in the Battle of Tirad Pass.

=== American invasion ===
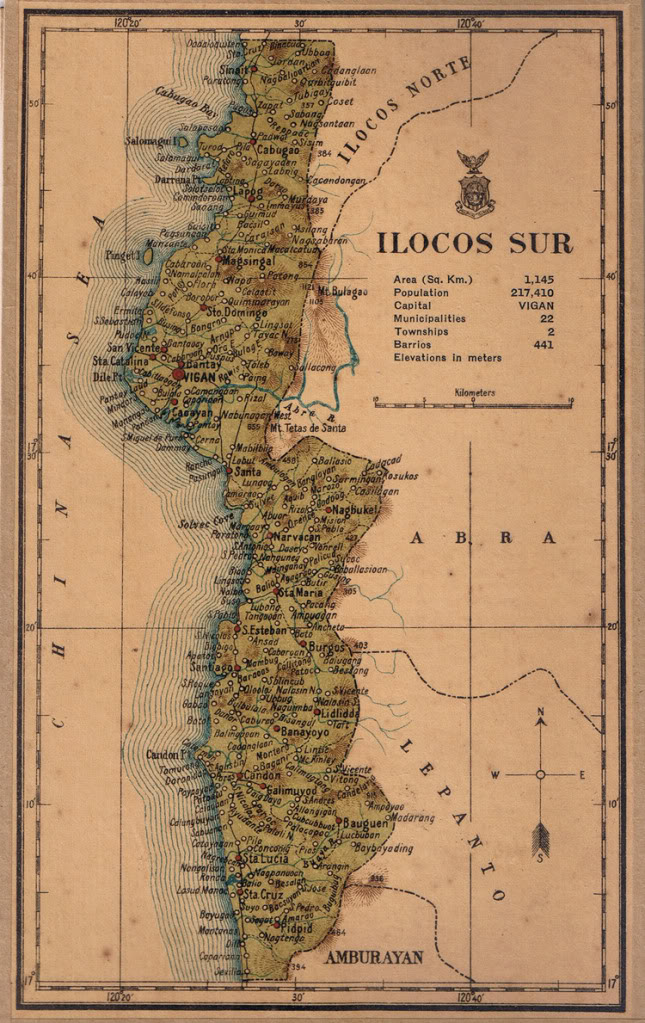
A map of Ilocos Sur in 1918. Note the then-existing sub-provinces of Amburayan and Lepanto outside its borders.

Under the Americans, a civil government was established in Ilocos Sur on September 1, 1901. Mena Crisólogo, a delegate to the Malolos Congress, was the first provincial governor. In 1920, parts of the sub-province of Amburayan were annexed to Ilocos Sur.

==== Second phase of Ilocano migration ====
During the second phase of Ilocano migration, from 1908 to 1946, surplus labor migrated to the plantations of Hawaii and the U.S. West Coast. Ilocos Sur's population density was 492 per square mile at the height of migration, which made it the most densely populated region in the Philippines except for Manila. The last group of labor migrants to Hawaii was in 1946, when 7,365 men were recruited by the United States Department of Labor. Vigan was the recruiting center. More than eighty percent of Filipinos in Hawaii are of Ilocano origin.

=== Japanese occupation ===
On December 10, 1941, a contingent of Japanese Imperial forces landed in Mindoro, Vigan, Santa, Pandan and Caoayan. In Cervantes, the Battle of Bessang Pass was fought between Tomoyuki Yamashita's forces and the U.S. 21st Infantry; it was the greatest victory by Filipino guerrillas over the Japanese Imperial Army in World War II. The guerrillas mounted a series of attacks that lasted for almost six months in early 1945.

=== Marcos era ===
Much of the history of Ilocos Sur during the 21 years of the Marcos dictatorship are not well-documented, with the most prominent portrayals of Ilocos Sur history preferring to skip from the years immediately after Philippine independence in the 1940s, jumping straight to contemporary times.

In Ilocos Sur, the most prominent protests and incidents of the Marcos era – such as the infamous "Bantay incident: and the assassination of Reoresentative Floro Crisologo - actually took place before the declaration of martial law in 1972, and involved the Marcos administration's support for local strongmen rather than national controversies.

Organizations such as the Federation of Free Farmers (FFF) and Federation of Free Workers (FFW), sometimes supported by progressive elements of the Catholic Church, continued to fight for the labor rights of the poor until the 1972 declaration of Martial law made it illegal to peaceful protests.

Some of the frustrated protesters then opted to pursue an armed resistance against the dictatorship, many of whom only returned to peaceful life after the Marcoses were finally deposed by the civilian-led People Power revolution of 1986.

There were numerous human rights violations documented in Ilocos Sur in connection to the Marcos martial law era, and there was at least one camp in the province that held political Prisoners during the Marcos era - a "Camp Diego Silang", which is different from the Police Camp established in La Union in 1989.

==== Bantay incident ====
Marcos' victory in the 1965 Presidential Elections had required that he gain political control of the north as a solid voting block, which meant forming alliances with the most prominent local "warlords" of the time - Ilocos Norte 1st District Representative Antonio Raquiza whom Marcos would later appoint as Secretary of Public Works and Highways; La Union 2nd District Representative Manuel T. Cases; and Ilocos Sur 1st District Representative Floro Singson Crisologo. Crisologo's cousin, Captain Fabian Ver of the Philippine Constabulary's Criminal Investigation Service, became part of Marcos' inner circle and eventually became one of Marcos' most trusted lieutenants. Historian Alfred McCoy noted in a 2017 article that "The Crisologos were one of the political families that was buoyed by the rise of Marcos to power, and that they were able to dominate their political rivals in Ilocos Sur as Marcos solidified his hold on power. McCoy also noted that Crisologo created a private army, which residents called the saka-saka, which literally means "barefooted" in Ilocano; controlled electoral offices; and used blockades to create a monopoly on the tobacco that came out of the province.

But a turning point took place in May 1970 with the so-called "Bantay Incident". The saka-saka assassinated a former mayor of Bantay, the town next to Vigan, in 1969, and then in May 1970, burned the villages of Ora Este and Ora Centro in retaliation for their residents' support for Crisologo's opponent Chavit Singson during the 1996 elections. One elderly woman who was killed in the blaze. Public opinion compelled Marcos to investigate the incident and arrest Crisologo's son Vincent, who was reported to be the leader the saka-saka at the time. McCoy notes that Crisologo reportedly went to Marcos and appealed for help, while demanding a greater share of rewards that Marcos had promised him in exchange for supporting his presidential reelection campaign in 1969. When Marcos refused, Crisologo reportedly then threatened to expose Marcos's and Ver's participation in cornering the tobacco monopoly in the Ilocos Region.

==== Assassination of Floro Crisologo ====
Shortly after his reported meeting with Marcos, Crisologo was killed on 18 October 1970 after being shot in the head while kneeling inside Vigan Cathedral during a church service, by a gunman who stood directly behind him and then escaped among terrified churchgoers. His killer was never found and the case remains unsolved.

No special election was called to replace him in Congress, and his seat remained vacant until the dissolution of Congress in 1972 following the declaration of martial law by President Marcos in 1972 and was only occupied again in 1987 following Marcos's overthrow and the restoration of Congress. Crisologo's murder and the defeat of his wife Carmeling to Chavit Singson in the gubernatorial race and that of his son Vincent in the mayoralty contest in Vigan to a brother of Chavit in 1971 led to the end of his family's political dominance in the province and the rise of the Singson family to prominence.

=== Contemporary history ===
==== 1986-87 Jose Burgos Jr provisional revolutionary governorship ====
When the People Power Revolution which ended on February 25, 1986 deposed Ferdinand Marcos from power, and installed Corazon Aquino as the new president of the Philippines, a provisional revolutionary government was set up in the country, and newspaper publisher Jose G. Burgos Jr. was appointed OIC Governor until a new constitution could be ratified and new officials elected.

==== 2020 COVID-19 pandemic ====
Executive Order No. 12 and Executive Order No. 13, were issued on March 12 and 13, 2020, respectively, mandating the suspension of classes at all levels from March 13 to April 12, 2020, as well as the suspension of other school activities that involve the gathering of crowds, at both public and private schools in the province. On March 15, the province was placed under community quarantine through Executive Order No. 14 which restricted the movement of people to and from Ilocos Sur, mandated the establishment of checkpoints and conditions for transportation and travel, prohibited social gatherings, encouraged flexible/alternative work arrangements or suspension of work, suspended tourism, prohibited hoarding, delineated rules for business establishments, and imposed a curfew.

After the approval of "uniform travel protocols for land, air, and sea of the Department of the Interior and Local Government, crafted in close coordination with the Union of Local Authorities of the Philippines, League of Provinces of the Philippines, League of Municipalities of the Philippines, and the League of Cities of the Philippines," in Resolution No. 101, Series of 2021, Ilocos Sur Governor Ryan Luis V. Singson issued Executive Order No. 22, Series of 2021, mandating the travel protocols for implementation in the province. The resolution institutionalized the use of the System Safe, Swift, and Smart Passage (S-PaSS) Travel Management System, and the executive order eliminated the mandatory testing requirement for persons in specific traveler classifications who seek to enter or pass through the province.

Frontage of Vigan Cathedral following the July 2022 earthquake

==== 2022 Luzon earthquake ====
Ilocos Sur was severely affected by the 2022 Luzon earthquake, which was felt strongly in Ilocos Sur for 30 seconds or longer. A total of 32 towns and two cities received damage, with the heaviest in Vigan. Nearly 100 homes were heavily damaged. Heritage sites in the UNESCO World Heritage City of Vigan were damaged, including the Vigan Cathedral and old-century houses, as well as few toppled power lines along Calle Crisologo. Parts of the old historic belfry of Bantay Church in the town of the same name also suffered severe damage.

== Geography ==
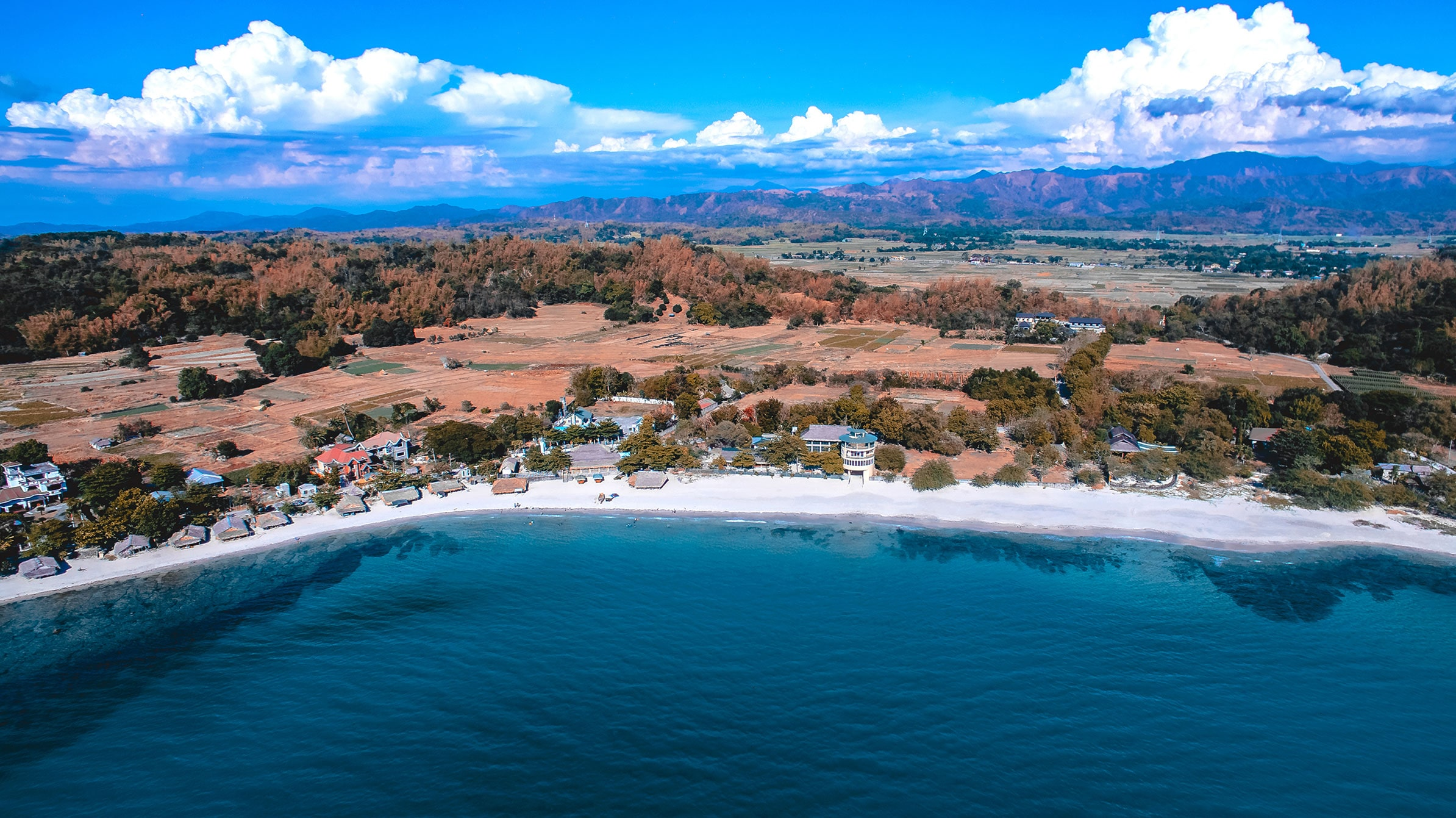
Sinait coastline

Ilocos Sur occupies the central section of the Ilocos Region in northern Luzon. It is bordered by Ilocos Norte to the north, Abra to the northeast, Mountain Province to the east, Benguet to the southeast, La Union to the south, and the South China Sea to the west. Its area of 2,596.00 square kilometres (1,002.32 sq mi) occupies about 20% of the total land area of Region 1. The topography of Ilocos Sur ranges from 10 to 1,700 metres (33 to 5,577 ft) above sea level.

=== Climate ===
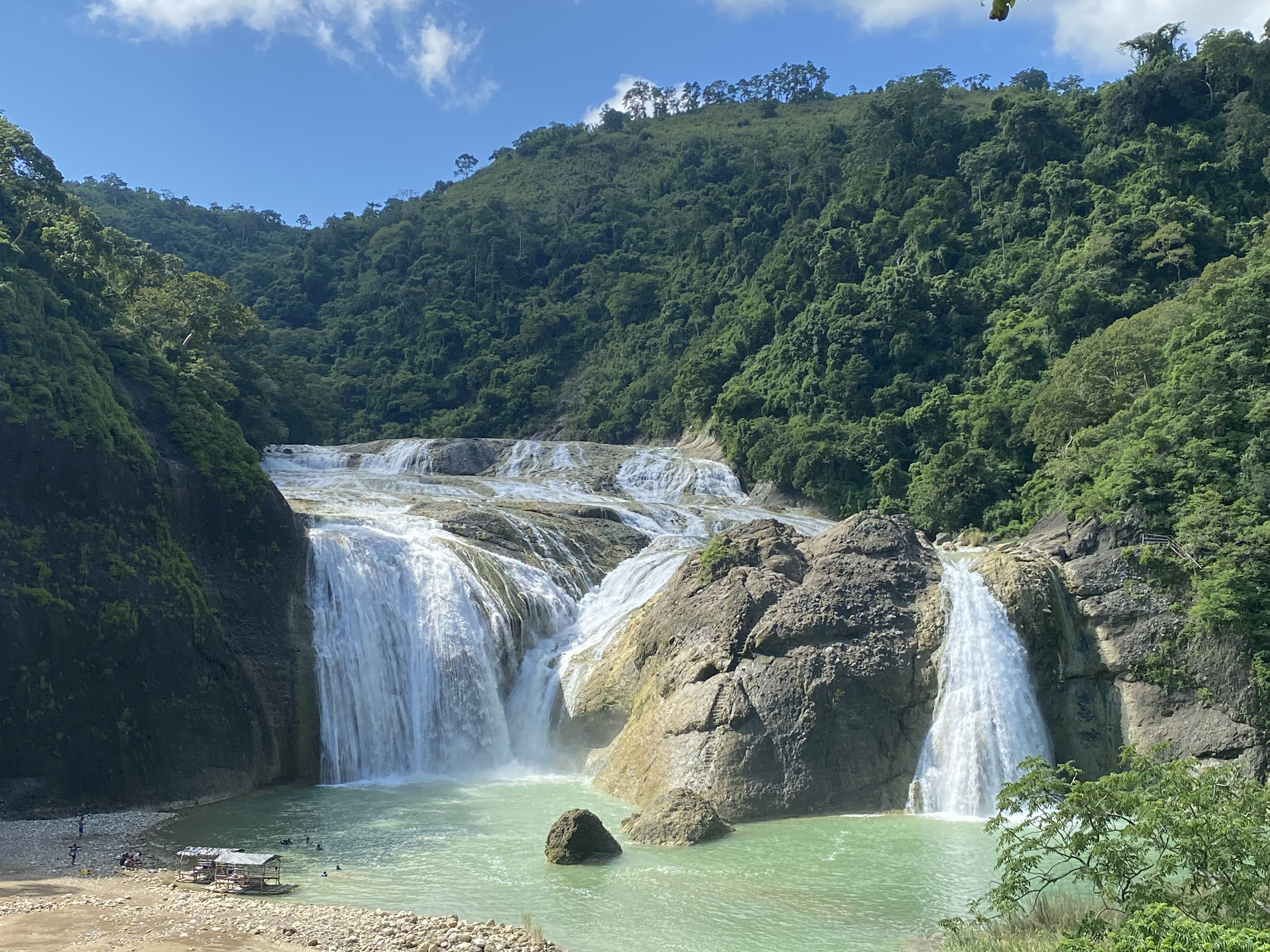
Pinsal Falls in Santa Maria during the rainy season

The climate is generally dry as defined by the Hernandez climate classification—the dry months are from October to May. The southernmost portion in Cervantes is wet with rain evenly distributed throughout the year while the southeastern part of Sugpon receives less precipitation. The rainy season arrives in August while January and February have the lowest precipitation. The mean temperature in the province is 27 °C (81 °F). January is the coldest month, with average minimum temperatures dropping to around 21 °C (70 °F).

=== Administrative divisions ===
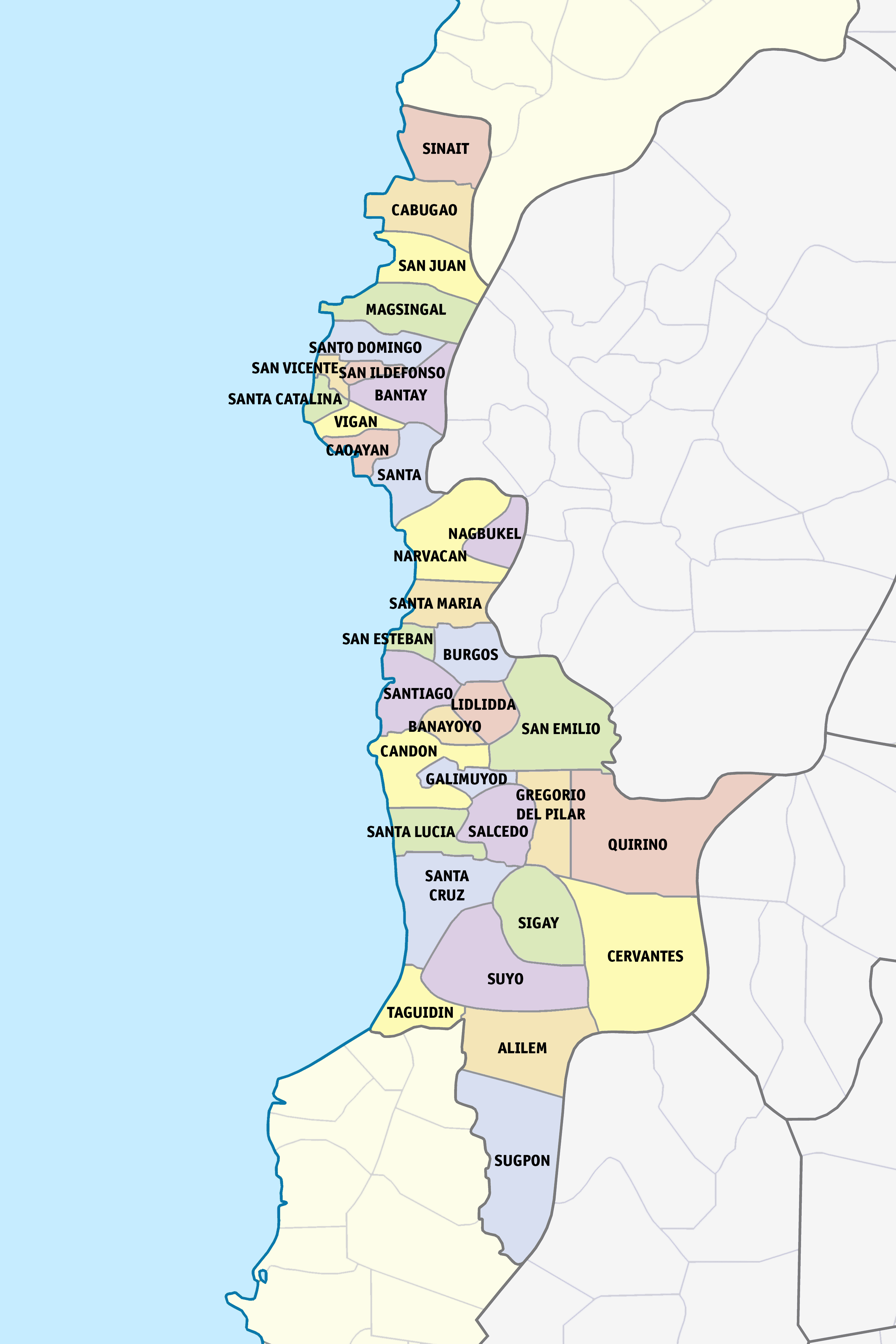
Political map of Ilocos Sur

Ilocos Sur comprises 32 municipalities and 2 component cities, which are organized into two legislative districts. There are a total of 768 barangays in the province.

- † Provincial capital and component city
- ∗ Component city
- Municipality

City or municipality		District	Population			±% p.a.	Area		Density		Barangay	Coordinates^{[A]}
			(2020)		(2015)		km^{2}	sq mi	/km^{2}	/sq mi		
Alilem		2nd	1.1%	7,361	6,695	1.82%	119.33	46.07	62	160	9	16°53′13″N 120°31′48″E
Banayoyo		2nd	1.1%	7,931	7,748	0.45%	24.63	9.51	320	830	14	17°14′09″N 120°28′47″E
Bantay		1st	5.4%	37,118	35,731	0.73%	76.60	29.58	480	1,200	34	17°34′54″N 120°23′11″E
Burgos (Nueva Coveta)		2nd	1.9%	12,793	12,224	0.87%	44.38	17.14	290	750	26	17°18′58″N 120°30′33″E
Cabugao		1st	5.6%	38,884	37,501	0.69%	95.56	36.90	410	1,100	33	17°47′33″N 120°27′21″E
Candon	∗	2nd	8.9%	61,432	60,623	0.25%	103.28	39.88	590	1,500	42	17°11′22″N 120°26′51″E
Caoayan		1st	2.8%	19,574	19,861	−0.28%	17.42	6.73	1,100	2,800	17	17°32′52″N 120°23′00″E
Cervantes (Mantamang)		2nd	2.8%	19,449	17,211	2.35%	234.70	90.62	83	210	13	16°59′24″N 120°44′07″E
Galimuyod		2nd	1.5%	10,244	10,748	−0.91%	34.40	13.28	300	780	24	17°10′59″N 120°28′07″E
Gregorio del Pilar (Ananaaw/Concepcion)		2nd	0.6%	4,472	4,875	−1.63%	41.66	16.09	110	280	7	17°08′53″N 120°36′39″E
Lidlidda		2nd	0.7%	4,705	4,647	0.24%	33.84	13.07	140	360	11	17°15′07″N 120°31′15″E
Magsingal		1st	4.5%	31,308	30,792	0.32%	84.98	32.81	370	960	30	17°41′06″N 120°25′33″E
Nagbukel		2nd	0.8%	5,465	5,259	0.73%	43.12	16.65	130	340	12	17°26′48″N 120°31′34″E
Narvacan		2nd	6.7%	46,234	44,006	0.94%	122.21	47.19	380	980	34	17°25′10″N 120°28′37″E
Quirino (Angaki)		2nd	1.3%	9,306	8,573	1.57%	240.10	92.70	39	100	9	17°08′12″N 120°40′35″E
Salcedo (Bauguen)		2nd	1.6%	11,110	11,288	−0.30%	103.44	39.94	110	280	21	17°09′03″N 120°32′10″E
San Emilio		2nd	1.0%	7,206	7,407	−0.52%	141.44	54.61	51	130	8	17°14′19″N 120°34′44″E
San Esteban (Cabagbagototan)		2nd	1.2%	8,381	8,349	0.07%	19.62	7.58	430	1,100	10	17°19′47″N 120°26′42″E
San Ildefonso		1st	1.2%	8,190	7,787	0.97%	11.35	4.38	720	1,900	15	17°37′30″N 120°23′35″E
San Juan (Lapog)		1st	3.9%	26,674	26,411	0.19%	64.37	24.85	410	1,100	32	17°44′32″N 120°27′30″E
San Vicente (Tuanong)		1st	1.9%	13,118	12,758	0.53%	12.60	4.86	1,000	2,600	7	17°35′39″N 120°22′22″E
Santa		2nd	2.2%	14,992	15,340	−0.44%	109.10	42.12	140	360	26	17°29′10″N 120°26′04″E
Santa Catalina		1st	2.1%	14,493	13,945	0.74%	9.68	3.74	1,500	3,900	9	17°35′20″N 120°21′48″E
Santa Cruz		2nd	6.0%	41,366	39,868	0.70%	88.78	34.28	470	1,200	49	17°05′04″N 120°27′07″E
Santa Lucia (Kaog/Dumangague)		2nd	3.8%	25,966	25,402	0.42%	49.72	19.20	520	1,300	36	17°07′02″N 120°26′53″E
Santa Maria (Purok)		2nd	4.4%	30,006	30,321	−0.20%	63.31	24.44	470	1,200	33	17°22′03″N 120°28′51″E
Santiago		2nd	2.8%	19,471	18,759	0.71%	46.36	17.90	420	1,100	24	17°17′38″N 120°26′43″E
Santo Domingo		1st	4.2%	29,041	27,975	0.71%	55.49	21.42	520	1,300	36	17°38′16″N 120°24′36″E
Sigay		2nd	0.4%	2,552	2,737	−1.32%	81.55	31.49	31	80	7	17°02′34″N 120°34′46″E
Sinait		1st	3.8%	25,998	25,640	0.26%	65.56	25.31	400	1,000	44	17°51′59″N 120°27′22″E
Sugpon		2nd	0.7%	4,930	4,585	1.39%	57.11	22.05	86	220	6	16°49′38″N 120°29′45″E
Suyo		2nd	1.6%	10,766	11,446	−1.16%	124.00	47.88	87	230	8	16°58′33″N 120°31′30″E
Tagudin		2nd	6.0%	41,538	39,277	1.07%	151.19	58.37	270	700	43	16°56′04″N 120°26′42″E
Vigan City	†	1st	7.8%	53,935	53,879	0.02%	25.12	9.70	2,100	5,400	39	17°34′22″N 120°23′12″E
Total				706,009	689,668	0.45%	2,596.00	1,002.32	270	700	768	(see GeoGroup box)
Former names are italicized.		† Provincial capital				1. Coordinates mark the city/town center, and are sortable by latitude.						

=== Barangays ===
The 32 municipalities and 2 cities of the province comprise a total of 768 barangays, with Puro in Magsingal as the most populous in 2010, and Montero in Banayoyo as the least.

== Demographics ==
Population census of Ilocos Sur
Year	Pop.	±% p.a.
1903	189,572	—
1918	247,458	+1.79%
1939	271,532	+0.44%
1948	276,278	+0.19%
1960	338,058	+1.70%
1970	385,139	+1.31%
1975	419,776	+1.74%
1980	443,591	+1.11%
1990	519,966	+1.60%
1995	545,385	+0.90%
2000	594,206	+1.85%
2007	633,138	+0.88%
2010	658,587	+1.44%
2015	689,668	+0.88%
2020	706,009	+0.49%
2024	709,991	+0.14%
Source: Philippine Statistics Authority

According to the 2024 census, it has a population of 709,991 people, with a density of 270 inhabitants per square kilometre or 700 inhabitants per square mile.

The 1960 census lists 338,058 people; 64,446 dwelling units of which 2,974 are lighted with electricity; 3227 provided with radio; 7379 served with pipe water; 25,137 served with artesian and pumped water; and 310 using electricity, kerosene and gas for cooking.

An Ilocano family in Vigan, Ilocos Sur, c.1907

=== Inhabitants ===
Ilocos Sur is inhabited mostly by Ilocanos belonging to the third largest ethnic group of Austronesian origin. A Spanish chroniclerwrote that "the people are very simple, domestic and peaceful, large of body and very strong. "They are highly civilized. They are a most clean race, especially the women in their homes which they keep very neat and clean."

Miguel de Loarca records around 1582 that the Ilocanos are intelligent as the Zambaleños for they are farmers. The main occupation of the people is agriculture.

Father Juan de Medina noted in 1630 that the natives are 'the humblest and most tractable known and lived in nest and large settlements'.

=== Language ===
Ilocano is the main language of the native majority in the province, with neighboring La Union recognized it as an official language since 2012. It became widespread in neighboring regions of Cagayan Valley (Region II), Cordillera Administrative Region and major parts of Central Luzon (Region III)—where Ilocanos settled—as a lingua franca among respective Ilocano and non-Ilocano residents. Ilocano is also recognized as a minority language in Mindoro, Palawan and Mindanao (particularly in some areas in Soccsksargen), where Ilocanos had have been significant residents since the early 20th century. It is a third most widely spoken language in the Philippines, estimating 11 million speakers as of 2022. The language has many speakers overseas, including the American states of California and Hawaii. Filipino/Tagalog and English are also spoken and understood in the region, utilized in business, education and media.

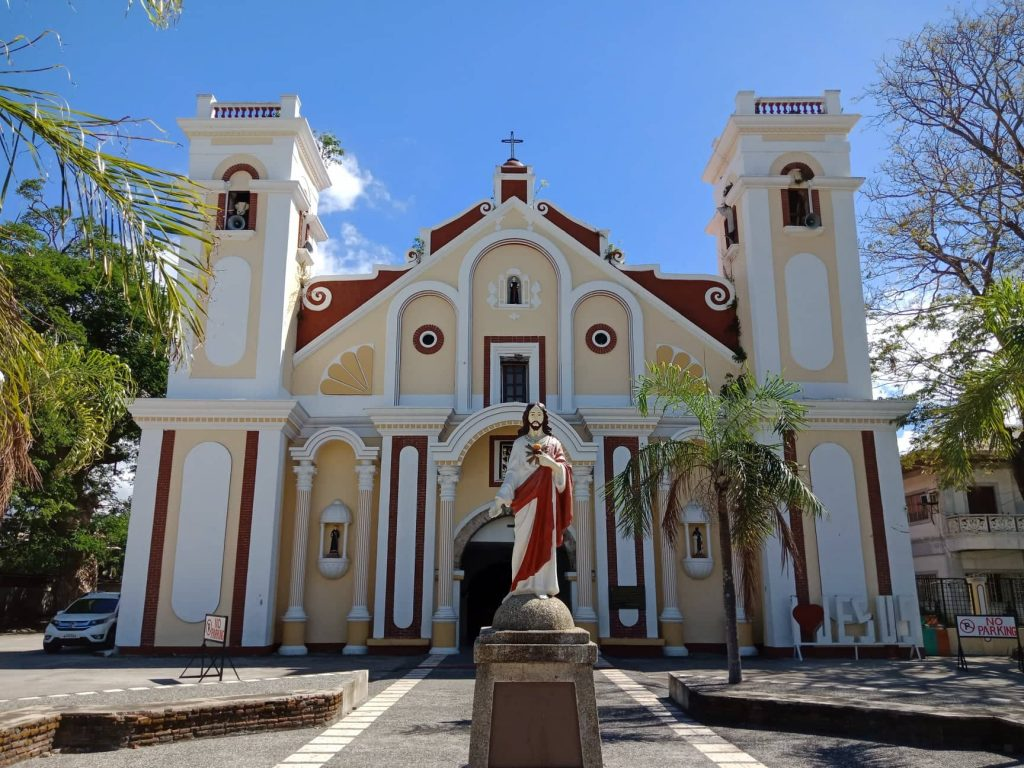
Sinait Basilica

=== Religion ===
The province is predominantly Roman Catholic with 75% of population adherence. Aglipayan Church is also a considerable a minority with a 5% adherence. Other religious beliefs are represented by other Christian Churches such as Baptist and Iglesia ni Cristo, Methodist, Seventh-day Adventist, and other Evangelical Christians, as well as Muslims.

== Economy ==
Poverty incidence of Ilocos Sur (%)

Source: Philippine Statistics Authority

Santa Catalina Market

=== Economic indicators ===
Ilocos Sur's economy surged by 5.6% in 2024 to ₱103.22 billion, driven by a strong 58.6% services sector (tourism, retail) and 27.2% industry, making it the second-fastest-growing province in the Ilocos region. Key indicators include 15.3% agriculture, significant growth in food services (23.1%), and a 1st income class status.

=== Products and industries ===
The people are engaged in farming, producing food crops, mostly rice, corn, vegetable, root crops, and fruits. Non-food crops include tobacco, cotton, and tigergrass. Cottage industries include loom weaving, furniture making, jewelry making, ceramics, blacksmithing, and food processing.

A rice field in Bantay

=== Agriculture ===
Ilocos Sur's economy is agrarian, but its 2,647 square kilometres (1,022 sq mi) of unfertile land is not enough to support a population of 338,579.

Agricultural crops such as rice, corn tobacco and fruit trees dominate their farm industries. Secondary crops are camote and cassava, sugar cane and onions.

The rapidly growing population, the decreasing fertility of the soil, and the long period between the planting and harvesting season, have forced the people to turn to manufacture and trade. Many Ilocanos go to the Cagayán valley, Central Plains and Mindanao to sell Ilocano woven cloth.

Virginia leaf tobacco is still a premier cash crop, after a windfall brought about by the Tobacco Subsidy Law authored by Congressman Floro Crisologo in 1964, and later enhanced by the Republic Act No. 7171 authored by Congressman Luis "Chavit" Singson.

Weaving is the most extensive handicraft, once bolstered by the installation of the NDC Textile Mills in Narvacan which supplied the weavers with yarn.

Other industries are burnay and slipper making in Vigan, furniture, cabinet, and statue making in San Vicente, mortar and pestle making in San Esteban, and bolo making in Santa.

== Infrastructure ==
=== Electricity ===
All municipalities in Ilocos Sur are electrified, courtesy of the Ilocos Sur Electric Cooperative (ISECO).

== Education ==
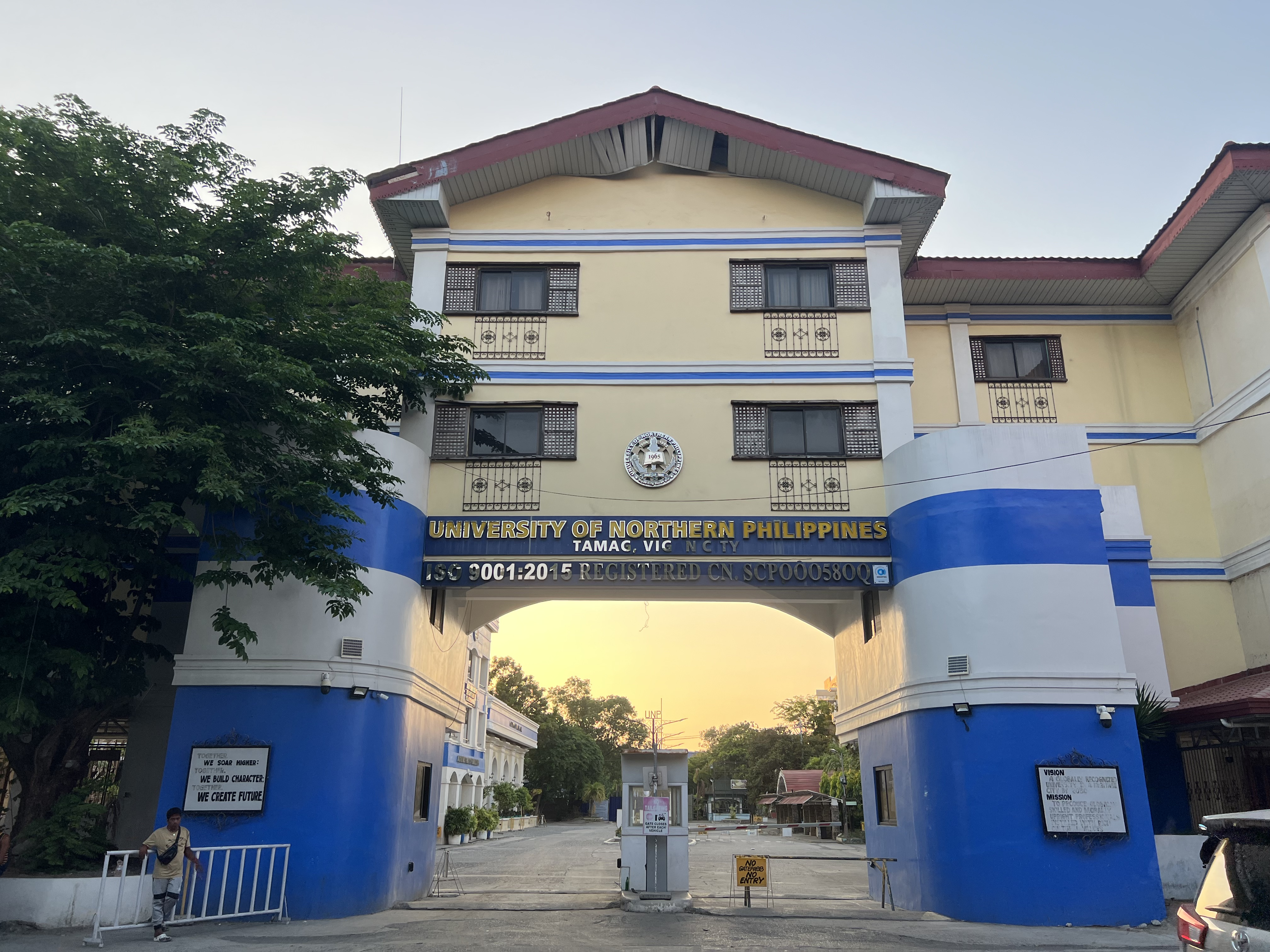
University of Northern Philippines in Vigan City

Ilocos Sur has 547 public schools including five general high schools, one university, one agricultural college and 56 private schools, 16 of which are Catholic.

Notable schools in Ilocos Sur include St. Paul College of Ilocos Sur in Bantay (a historic Catholic institution with high passing rates), the Philippine Science High School Ilocos Region Campus in San Ildefonso, and the University of Northern Philippines in Vigan City. These institutions are recognized for their academic contributions to the region.

== Culture ==
Crisologo Museum, Vigan City

The Ilocos Sur Museum, founded on August 22, 1970, has a collection of cultural treasures which include art include paintings, centuries-old sculptures, pieces of carved furniture, and relics of Spanish European and Chinese cultures that had influenced Ilocano life for centuries.

Chapters of Philippine history and religion are found in the Crisólogo collections which includes family heirlooms, centuries-old "santos" (traditional Philippine Roman Catholic religious icons carved from wood or ivory), other ivory images, Vienna furniture, marble-topped tables, ancient-carved beds, rare Chinese porcelains, jars and jarlettes, lamps, Muslim brass wares, and Spanish and Mexican coins.

The Syquia collections, including then President Elpidio Quirino's memorabilia, vie in quality with the Crisólogo collections. But in the midst of a fire scare in Vigan in the late 1908s and 1990s, the relics in the Syquia Mansion were transferred to Manila for safekeeping.

== UNESCO Recognitions in Ilocos Sur ==
UNESCO has inscribed two Ilocos Sur sites in the World Heritage List.

=== Heritage City of Vigan ===
In 1999, the Heritage City of Vigan was inscribed in the World Heritage List. UNESCO describes the site as:

"Established in the 16th century, Vigan is the best-preserved example of a planned Spanish colonial town in Asia. Its architecture reflects the coming together of cultural elements from elsewhere in the Philippines, from China and from Europe, resulting in a culture and townscape that have no parallel anywhere in East and South-East Asia."

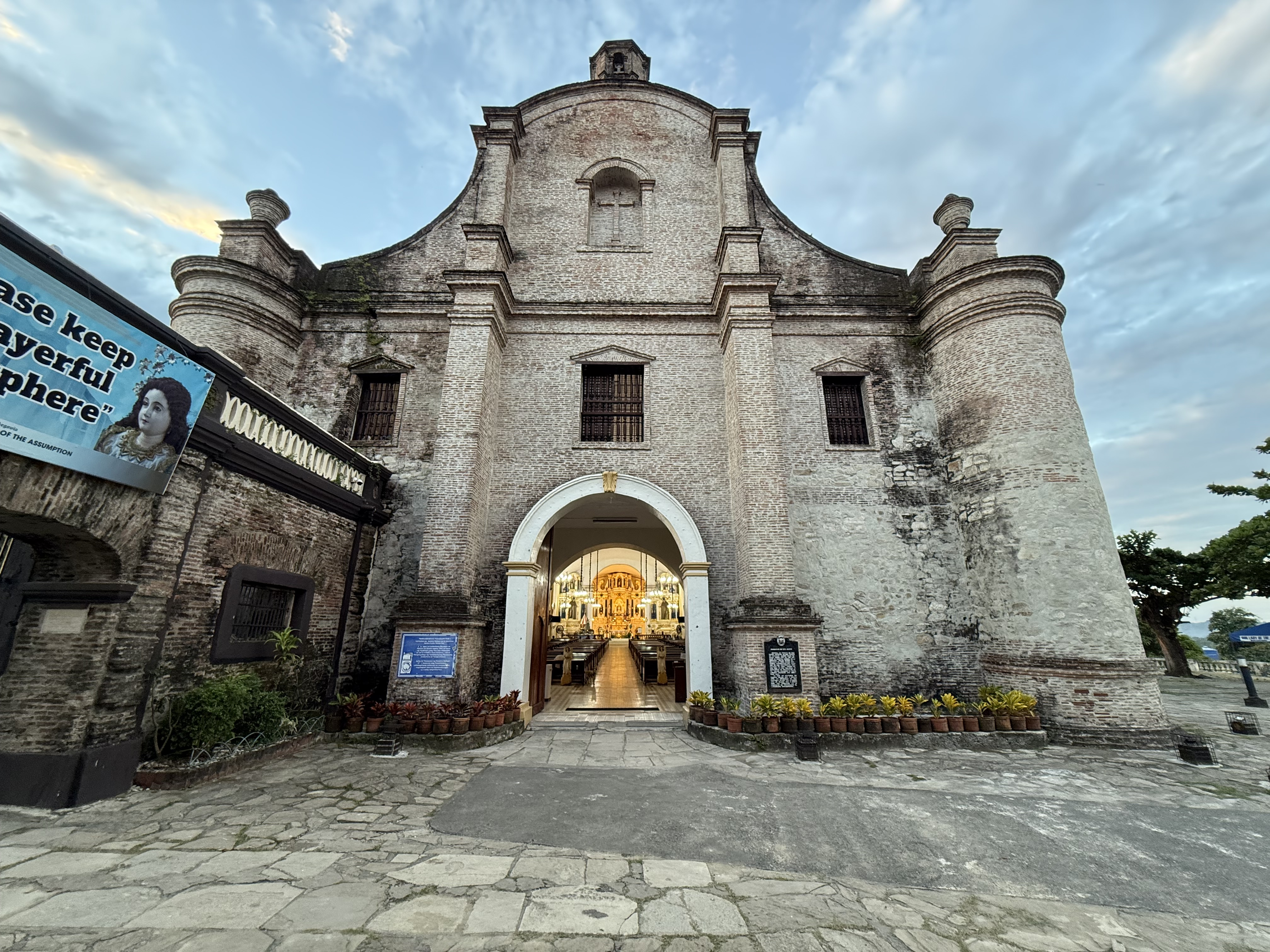
Minor Basilica of Our Lady of the Assumption, Santa Maria

=== Santa Maria Basilica Shrine ===
In 1993, the Baroque Churches of the Philippines, containing 4 properties, was inscribed in the World Heritage List. One of the properties was the Santa Maria Church of Ilocos Sur. UNESCO describes, "[the] unique architectural style [of the churches] is a reinterpretation of European Baroque by Chinese and Philippine craftsmen."

== Notable people from Ilocos Sur ==
- Leona Florentino, an Ilocana foundational poet, dramatist, satirist, and playwright who is also known as the Mother of Philippine Women's Literature and honored in France, Spain, and the United States.
- Sixto Brillantes, 21st chairman of Commission on Elections
- Pedro Bucaneg, poet and the "Father of Ilocano literature"
- José Burgos, priest and one of the martyrs of Gomburza
- Marcelino Crisólogo, Filipino politician, poet, writer, and playwright.
- William Dar, 45th Secretary of Agriculture, and horticulturist
- Isabelo de los Reyes, prominent Filipino patriot, politician, writer and labor activist, founder of the Philippine Independent Church (an independent Philippine nationalist church). He is known as the "Father of Philippine Folklore", the "Father of the Philippine Labor Movement", and the "Father of Filipino Socialism".
- Jose L. de Ocampo, Filipino architect and artist.
- Krishnah Gravidez, Miss World Philippines 2024 and Miss World Asia 2025, from Santiago, Ilocos Sur
- Leopoldo Jaucian, Filipino Catholic bishop
- Leon C. Pichay, writer and poet, "King of Ilocano Poets" during the 50s.
- Jose Ping-ay, Filipino politician and founder of Ilocos Sur Cooperative Bank
- Alan Purisima, 17th Chief of the Philippine National Police
- Elpidio Quirino, 6th President of the Philippines, 2nd Vice President of the Philippines
- Nestor Redondo, Filipino comics artist
- Virgilio Redondo, Filipino comics artist
- Abraham Sarmiento, 119th Associate Justice of the Supreme Court of the Philippines
- Gabriela Silang, revolutionary leader, best known as the first female leader of a Filipino movement for independence from Spain
- Jose Maria Sison, Founding chairman of the Communist Party of the Philippines
- Philip Vera Cruz, Filipino American labor leader, farmworker, and leader in the Asian American movement
- Alfredo Verzosa, Filipino Catholic bishop and was venerated as a Servant of God in the Catholic Church
- Jose Melencio Nartatez, 32nd Chief of the Philippine National Police
- Chavit Singson, chief executive of Partas bus
