= Manang Biday =

Ilocano folk song

Manang Biday (English: Lady Biday; Kurditan: ᜋᜈᜅ᜔ ᜊᜒᜇᜌ᜔) is a traditional Ilocano folksong in Northern Luzon, particularly in the province of Ilocos. This song implies the courtship of a young maiden named Manang Biday. Serenading a love interest is a custom of the Filipinos. Until today, it is still practiced by the Ilocano. It is also a courtship dance. "Manang Biday" was originally composed by Florante Aguilar.

== Lyrics ==
=== Original Ilocano lyrics ===
Manang Biday, ilukatmo man
Ta bentana ikalumbabam
Ta kitaem toy, kinayayawan
Ay, matayakon no dinak kaasian

Siasino ka, nga aglabaslabas
Ditoy hardinko pagay-ayamak
Ammom ngarud a balasangak
Sabong ni lirio, di pay nagukrad

Denggem, ading, ta bilinenka

Agalakanto’t bunga’t mangga
Ken lansones pay, adu a kita

No nababa, dimo gaw-aten
No nangato, dika sukdalen
No naregreg, dika piduten
Ngem labaslabasamto met laeng

Daytoy paniok no maregregko
Ti makapidut isublinanto
Ta nagmarka iti naganko
Nabordaan pay ti sinanpuso

Alaem dayta kutsilio
Ta abriem ‘toy barukongko
Tapno maipapasmo ti guram
Kaniak ken sentimiento

=== ᜃᜓᜇ᜔ᜇᜒᜆᜈ᜔᜶ (Kurditan transcription) ===
ᜋᜈᜅ᜔ ᜊᜒᜇᜌ᜔᜵ ᜁᜎᜓᜃᜆ᜔ᜋᜓ ᜋᜈ᜔
ᜆ ᜊᜒᜈ᜔ᜆᜈ ᜁᜃᜎᜓᜋ᜔ᜊᜊᜋ᜔
ᜆ ᜃᜒᜆᜁᜋ᜔ 'ᜆᜓᜌ᜔ ᜃᜒᜈᜌᜏᜈ᜔
ᜀᜌ᜔᜵ ᜋᜆᜌᜃᜓᜈ᜔ ᜈᜓ ᜇᜒᜈᜃ᜔ ᜃᜀᜐᜒᜀᜈ᜔

ᜐᜒᜀᜐᜒᜈᜓ ᜃ᜵ ᜅ ᜀᜄ᜔ᜎᜊᜐ᜔ᜎᜊᜐ᜔
ᜇᜒᜆᜓᜌ᜔ ᜑᜇ᜔ᜇᜒᜈ᜔ ᜃᜓ ᜉᜄᜌ᜔-ᜀᜌᜋᜃ᜔
ᜀᜋ᜔ᜋᜓᜋ᜔ ᜅᜇᜓᜇ᜔ ᜀ ᜊᜎᜐᜅᜃ᜔
ᜐᜊᜓᜅ᜔ ᜈᜒ ᜎᜒᜇᜒᜂ᜵ ᜇᜒ ᜉᜌ᜔ ᜈᜄᜓᜃ᜔ᜇᜇ᜔

ᜇᜒᜅ᜔ᜄᜒᜋ᜔᜵ ᜀᜇᜒᜅ᜔᜵ ᜆ ᜊᜒᜎᜒᜈᜒᜈ᜔ᜃ
ᜆ ᜁᜈ᜔ᜃᜈ᜔ᜆᜓ ‘ᜇᜒᜀᜌ᜔ ᜐᜇᜒ ᜇᜌ
ᜀᜄᜎᜃᜈ᜔ᜆᜓ‘ᜆ᜔ ᜊᜓᜅ‘ᜆ᜔ ᜋᜅ᜔ᜄ
ᜃᜒᜈ᜔ ᜎᜈ᜔ᜐᜓᜈᜒᜐ᜔ ᜉᜌ᜔᜵ ᜀᜇᜓ ᜀ ᜃᜒᜆ

ᜈᜓ ᜈᜊᜊ᜵ ᜇᜒᜋᜓ ᜄᜏ᜔‘ᜀᜆᜒᜈ᜔
ᜈᜓ ᜈᜅᜆᜓ᜵ ᜇᜒᜃ ᜐᜓᜃ᜔
ᜈᜓ ᜈᜇᜒᜄ᜔ᜇᜒᜄ᜔᜵ ᜇᜒᜃ ᜉᜒᜇᜓᜆᜒᜈ᜔
ᜅᜒᜋ᜔ ᜎᜊᜐ᜔ᜎᜊᜐ᜔ᜀᜋ᜔ᜆᜓ ᜋᜒᜆ᜔ ᜎᜁᜅ᜔

ᜇᜌ᜔ᜆᜓᜌ᜔ ᜉᜈᜒᜂᜃ᜔ ᜈᜓ ᜋᜇᜒᜄ᜔ᜇᜒᜄ᜔ᜃᜓ
ᜆᜒ ᜋᜃᜉᜒᜇᜓᜆ᜔ ᜁᜐᜓᜊ᜔ᜎᜒᜈᜈ᜔ᜆᜓ
ᜆ ᜈᜄ᜔ᜋᜇ᜔ᜃ ᜁᜆᜒ ᜈᜄᜈ᜔ᜃᜓ
ᜈᜊᜓᜇ᜔ᜇᜀᜈ᜔ ᜉᜌ᜔ ᜆᜒ ᜐᜒᜈᜈ᜔ᜉᜓᜐᜓ

ᜀᜎᜁᜋ᜔ ᜇᜌ᜔ᜆ ᜃᜓᜆ᜔ᜐᜒᜎ᜔ᜌᜓ
ᜆ ᜀᜊ᜔ᜇᜒᜁᜋ᜔ 'ᜆᜓᜌ᜔ ᜊᜇᜓᜃᜓᜅ᜔ᜃᜓ
ᜆᜉ᜔ᜈᜓ ᜋᜁᜉᜉᜐ᜔ᜋᜓ ᜆᜒ ᜄᜓᜇᜋ᜔
ᜃᜈᜒᜀᜃ᜔ ᜆᜒ ᜐᜒᜈ᜔ᜆᜒᜋᜒᜁᜈ᜔ᜆᜓ

=== English translation ===
Dear Biday, please open
Open your window
So you can see the one who adores you
Oh, I will die if you will not care

Who are you who keeps passing by?
In my garden where I play
You know I'm a lady
My flowers has not bloomed

Listen my dear so I can tell you
Just go south
Get a mango fruit
Even lanzones and other kinds.

If it's low, why not cut it?
If it's high, why not pinch it?
If it fell, why not pick it
And don't just pass by

My handkerchief if I drop it
Whoever finds it will return it
My name is written in it
Also embroidered is a heart

Get that knife
To open my chest
To pass your anger
to me and sadness

== In popular culture ==
In 1954, Filipina actress Gloria Romero played the role of Biday in the movie Dalagang Ilokana with Filipino actor Ric Rodrigo. The movie was produced by Sampaguita Pictures and the folksong Manang Biday was used as a theme song sung by Gloria Romero herself.

Manang Biday was the title of a Filipino comedy film directed by Tony Cayado and was released by Lea Productions 17 April 1966 starring Amalia Fuentes and Luis Gonzales.
